= Volvo V70 =

Swedish executive station wagon

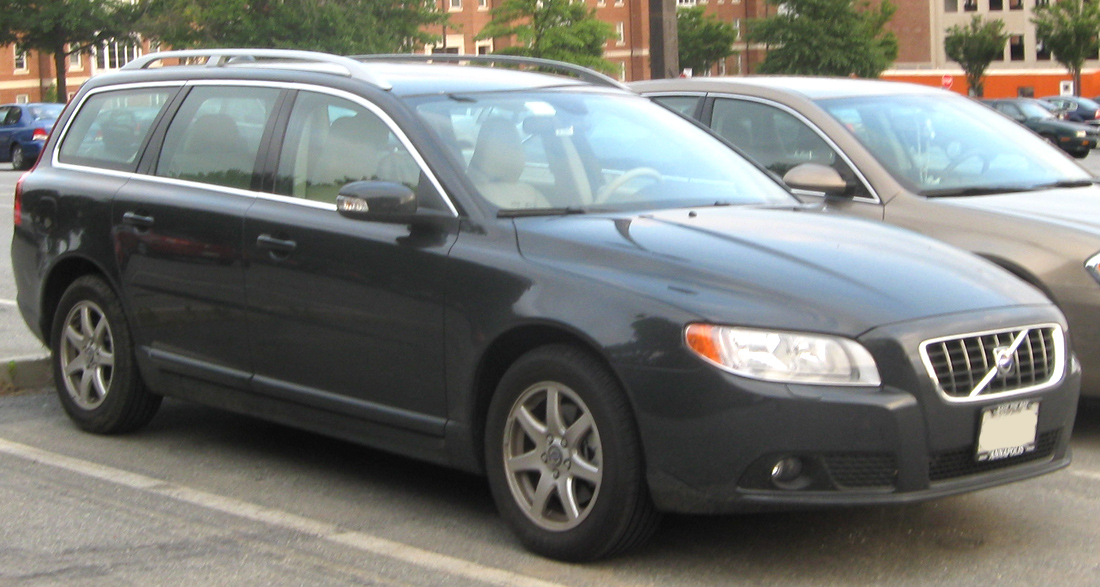

Overview
- Manufacturer: Volvo Cars
- Production: 1996–2016

Body and chassis
- Class: 1996-2007 Compact executive car (D); 2007-2016 Executive car (E)
- Body style: 5-door estate; 5-door crossover
- Layout: Front engine; front-wheel drive or four-wheel drive

Chronology
- Predecessor: Volvo 850 estate
- Successor: Volvo V60; Volvo V90

The Volvo V70 is an executive car manufactured and marketed by Volvo Cars from 1996 to 2016 across three generations. The name V70 combines the letter V, standing for versatility, and 70, denoting relative platform size (i.e., a V70 is larger than a V40, but smaller than a V90).

The first generation (1996–2000) debuted in November 1996. It was based on the P80 platform and was available with front and all-wheel drive (AWD), the latter marketed as the V70 AWD. In September 1997, a crossover version called the V70 XC or V70 Cross Country was introduced. The sedan model was called Volvo S70.

The second generation (2000–2007) debuted in spring 2000. It was based on the P2 platform and, as with its predecessor, was also offered as an all-wheel drive variant marketed as the V70 AWD and as a crossover version initially called V70 XC. For the 2003 model year, the crossover was renamed to XC70. The sedan model was called Volvo S60.

The third generation (2007–2016) debuted in February 2007. It was based on the P3 platform and marketed as the V70 and the XC70. Production of the V70 ended on 25 April 2016, the XC70 continued until 13 May 2016. The sedan model was called Volvo S80.

== First generation (1996–2000) ==
First generation
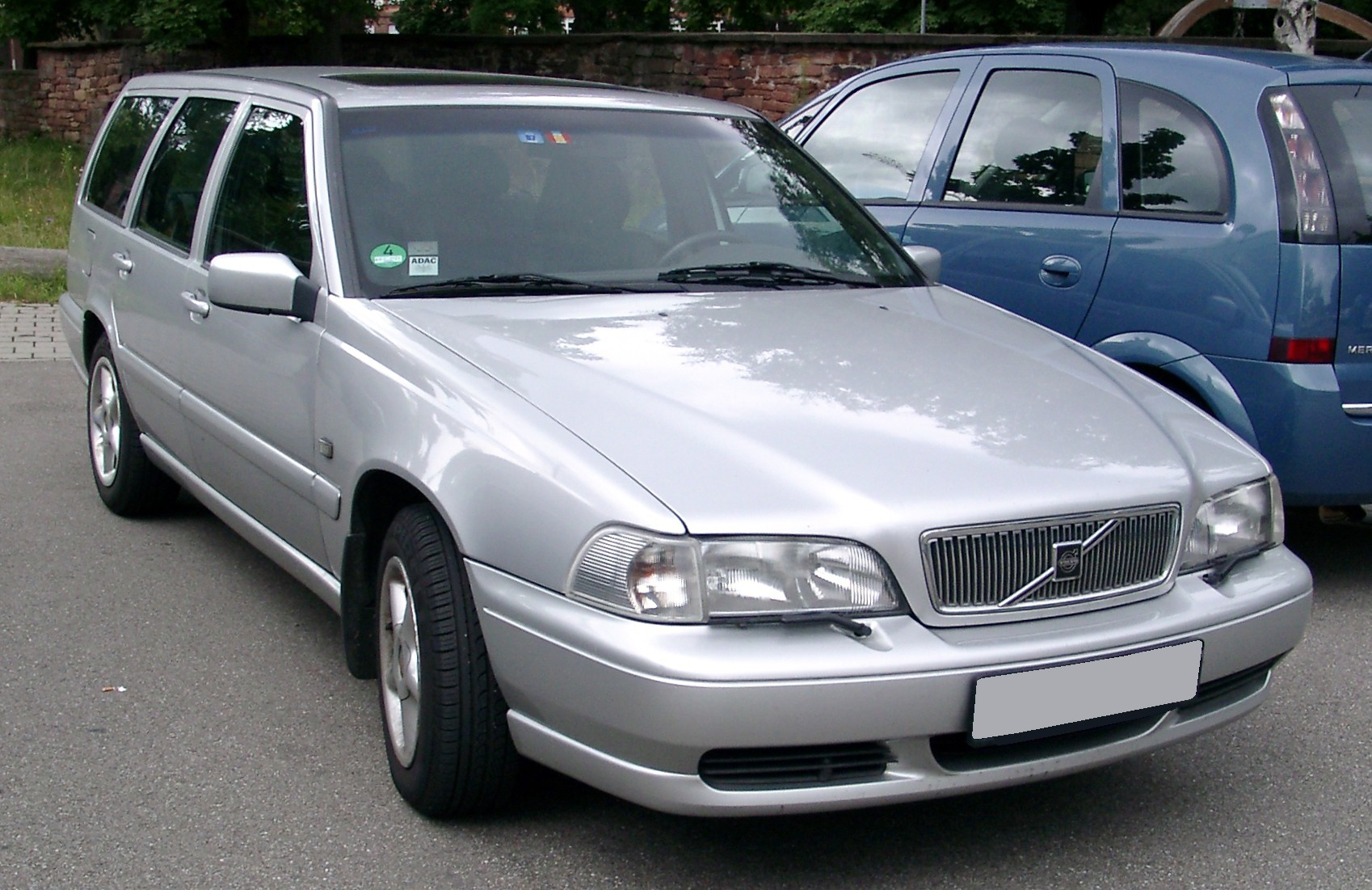
- 1999 Volvo V70 (Germany)

Overview
- Also called: Volvo V70 XC
- Production: 1996–2000 373,689 units; V70: 1996–2000 (319,832 units); V70 XC: 1997–2000 (53,857 units)
- Model years: 1997–2000 (V70); 1998–2000 (V70 XC)
- Assembly: Sweden: Torslanda (Torslandaverken); Belgium: Ghent (VCG); Canada: Halifax (VHA)
- Designer: Peter Horbury (exterior); José Luis Diaz de la Vega (interior)

Body and chassis
- Platform: Volvo P80 platform
- Related: Volvo S70; Volvo C70

Powertrain
- Engine: Petrol; 2.0–2.5L I5; Bi-Fuel; 2.4L I5; Diesel; 2.5L I5
- Transmission: Manual; 5-speed Volvo M56 / M58 / M59; Automatic; 4-speed Aisin AW50-42LE; 5-speed Aisin AW55-50SN

Dimensions
- Wheelbase: 1997–2000 FWD: 2,664 mm (104.9 in); 1997–1998 AWD: 2,662 mm (104.8 in); 1999–2000 AWD: 2,654 mm (104.5 in)
- Length: 1997–1998: 4,722 mm (185.9 in); 1999–2000: 4,729 mm (186.2 in); XC: 4,735 mm (186.4 in)
- Width: 1,761 mm (69.3 in)
- Height: 1,427–1,453 mm (56.2–57.2 in); R: 1,433–1,453 mm (56.4–57.2 in); XC: 1,481 mm (58.3 in)
- Curb weight: FWD: 1,410–1,518 kg (3,109–3,347 lb); AWD: 1,702–1,850 kg (3,752–4,079 lb)

Chronology
- Predecessor: Volvo 850 estate

The first generation V70 was an improved development on the basis of the Volvo 850 estate. Its overall design became more rounded doing away with the 850's square edges. Among the many changes were a completely revised front end, fully painted bumpers and side trim and clear indicator lenses all around. Most of the interior was redesigned, with new seats, door panels and dashboard. According to Volvo a total of 1800 changes were made. Standard equipment was improved significantly with remote central locking, heated and electrically adjustable mirrors, two front- and two side airbags, power anti-lock brakes (ABS), and power windows being standard on every car. Trim levels varied for each market as did equipment levels of the most basic trims. In the United States, the badging denoted the engine variant, and to some extent the equipment level, whereas in Europe engines and options could be chosen individually. In all markets more powerful versions received better or upgraded standard equipment. The T5 and R were the series high-performance models.

Small cosmetic and major technical changes were introduced for the 1999 model year. The Volvo logo on the front grille was redesigned, the square XC-style roof rails replaced the rounded version and black edge stickers on the rear doors were removed. Volvo improved the SRS-system airbags by introducing dual stage deployment logic for the front airbags, and its second generation, side impact protection system side airbag (SIPS-BAG II), whose volume was increased to offer better protection. A whiplash protection system (WHIPS) was also introduced as part of the standard equipment. New engine management systems with drive-by-wire throttle replaced the mechanical throttle on all petrol turbo models. The ABS was upgraded from a three-channel to a four-channel system, and an upgraded traction control now called STC (Stability Traction Control) was introduced. All-wheel drive models received thicker rear brake discs and redesigned rear calipers. The 4-speed automatic transmissions were upgraded to adaptive shift logic, replacing the previous three-mode selection.

For the 2000 model year, a new 5-speed automatic transmission with adaptive shift logic was introduced. It was only available on non-turbo, front-wheel drive models and the 2000 V70 R AWD. The naturally aspirated 10V engine was replaced by a detuned 20V variant. Drive-by-wire throttle was introduced for all non-turbo petrol engines. The 2.0L V70 XC was discontinued.

=== First generation models ===
==== V70 ====
The standard V70 was available with a variety of engines, gearboxes and equipment. The standard configuration was front-wheel drive. An all-wheel drive version badged as V70 AWD was available. For some markets Volvo offered a diesel version badged as V70 TDI. In countries such as Italy, with high taxes on cars with more than a 2.0L engine capacity, special petrol models with a 2000 cc engine capacity were offered. This included a 2.0T and a 2.0L T5 version, the latter with a slightly lower power output than the 2.3L variant. An optional third row seat increased occupant capacity from five to seven seats while reducing underfloor storage space in the trunk.

With the V70 Bi-Fuel Volvo continued to offer a factory compressed natural gas (CNG) powered car. A 95-litre (25 US gal) tank installed in the trunk allowed for a claimed range of 250 km (155 mi) running on CNG only. Due to the bulky tank, rear cargo space was reduced considerably. Drivers could choose whether their car ran on petrol or CNG at the touch of a button. On Bi-Fuel models the temperature gauge in the instrument cluster was replaced by a level gauge for the gas tank. Several options, such as a trip computer and sports suspension, were not available for Bi-Fuel models. Neither Bi-Fuel nor TDI were offered on the North American market.

Specialised vehicles such as taxis and police versions were also available directly from the factory. Changes included preparations to install additional equipment, a certified calibrated speedometer, uprated brakes with wear indicators and a different level of standard equipment.

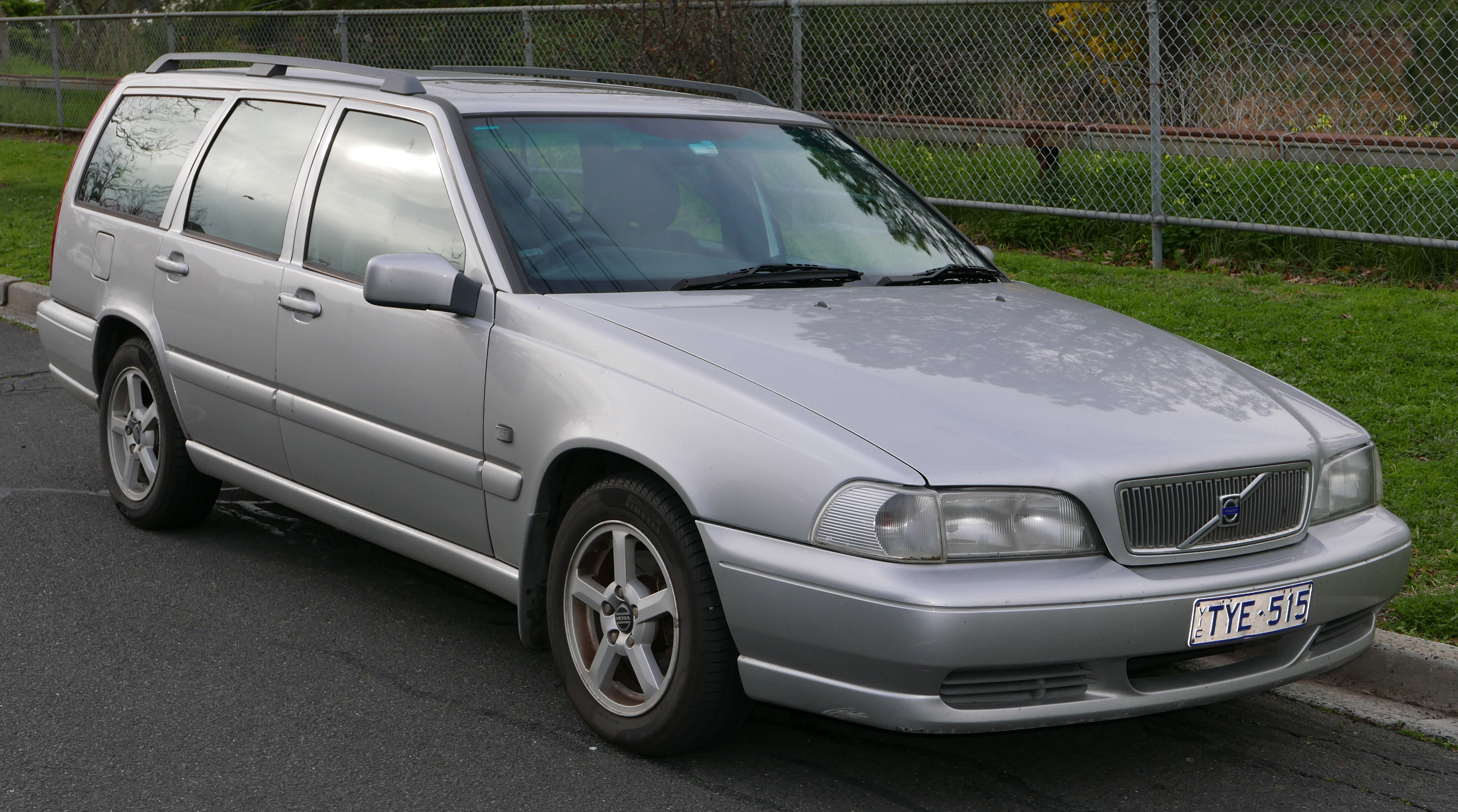
Volvo V70 (Australia)

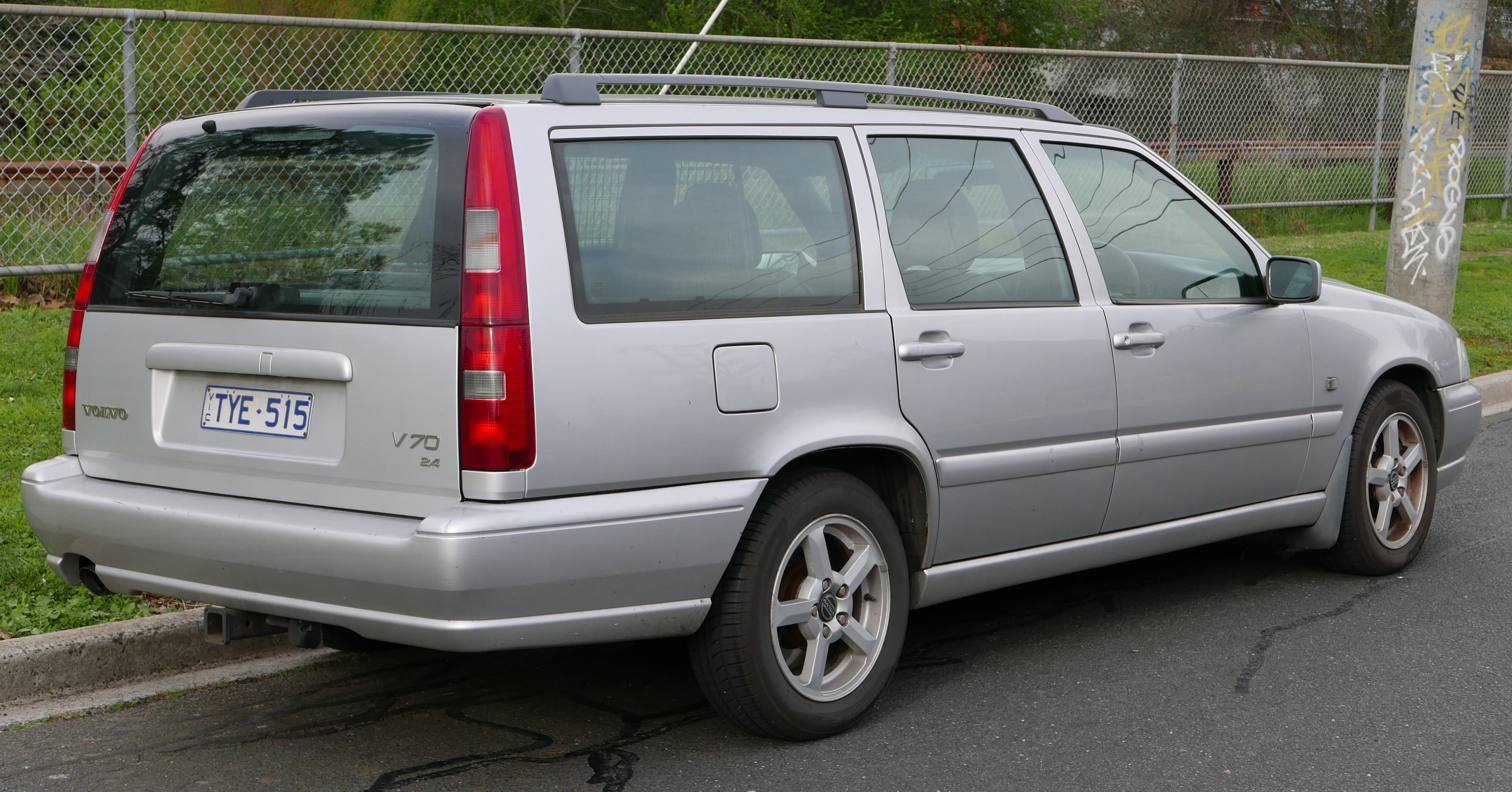
Volvo V70 (Australia)

==== V70 XC ====
The V70 XC, also referred to as the V70 Cross Country, the V70 AWD Cross Country, or the V70 Cross Country AWD was introduced in September 1997 at the Frankfurt Auto Show for the 1998 model year as a crossover version of the V70. It featured standard all-wheel drive and was available with only two engine and gearbox choices. In the US only the 2.4L turbo engine together with an automatic gearbox was available. A 2.0L version of the V70 XC was available only for markets with high taxes on cars with an engine capacity of more than 2000 cc. Standard ride height was increased 35 mm (1.4 in) overall with 26 mm (1.0 in) more ground clearance compared to the regular AWD model. Total ground clearance is 166 mm (6.5 in).

Visual differences from a standard V70 AWD included a unique front and rear bumper, unpainted sidetrim and sills, a squarer version of the roof rails, a unique front grille and a black decal with white Cross Country lettering across the tailgate. Buyers could also specify a two-tone exterior paint option called Duo Tone. (Note: Upper paint colour 019 'Black Stone', 189 'Polar White', 421 'Dark Olive', 426 'Silver' or 437 'Sandstone' in combination with lower paint colour 177 'Silver Grey') Interior details included thicker floor mats and special canvas/leather upholstery.

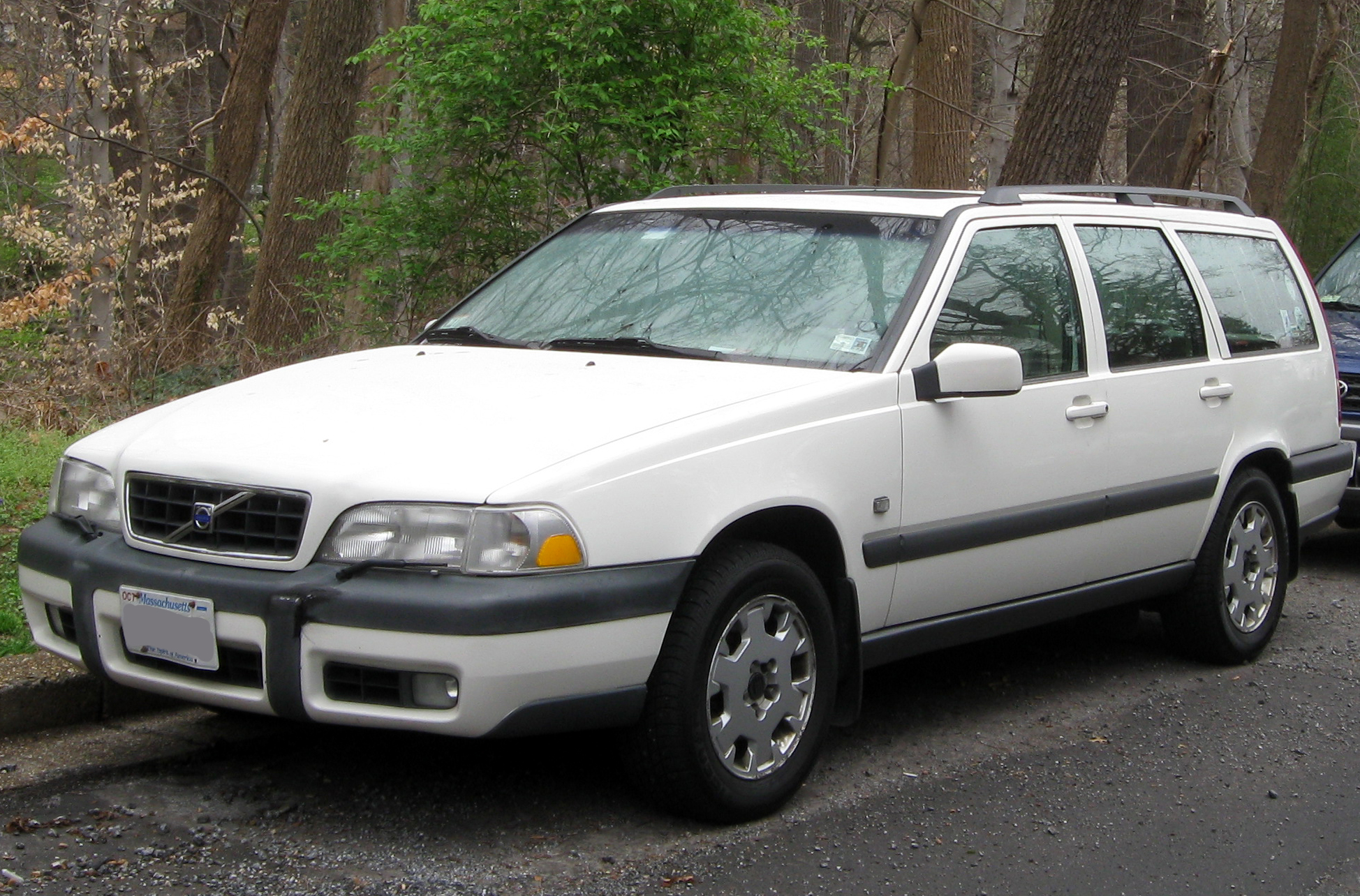
Volvo V70 XC (US)

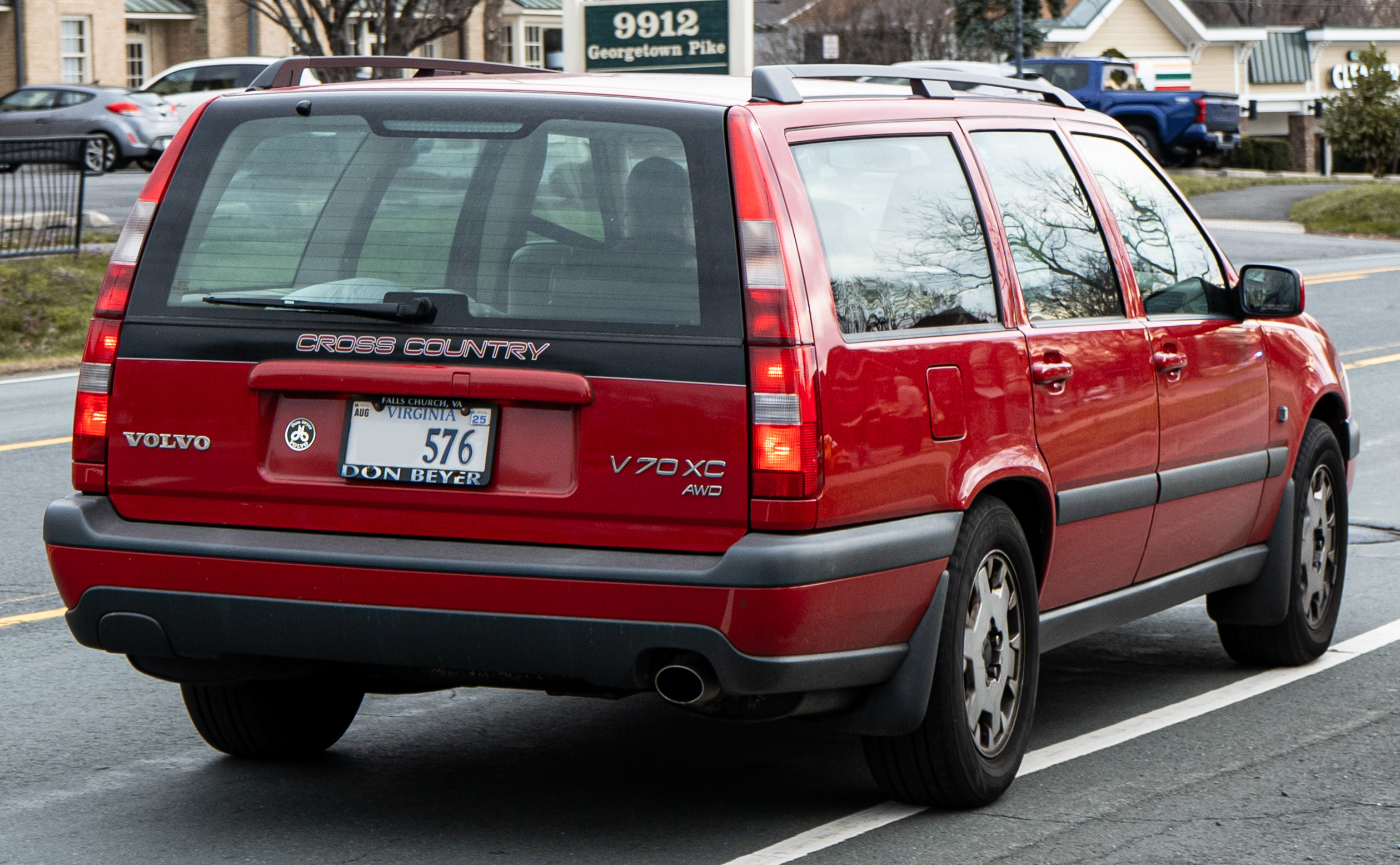
Volvo V70 XC (Canada)

==== V70 R ====
As the replacement for the popular 850 T-5R and 850 R, the V70 R was unveiled in May 1997. Similar to the previous generation R models it featured a unique leather/Alcantara interior with diamond stitching on the seats. Further styling touches were a special front bumper, blue gauge faces for the instrument cluster, two special colours and special alloy wheels. All US cars were equipped with 16 inch alloy wheels, other markets had 17 inch wheels available at extra cost or as standard equipment. Standard equipment was substantially upgraded over normal models with a few options available such as a trunk mounted CD-changer, Volvo's self developed Road and Traffic Information (RTI) navigation system, or an upgraded stereo system.

Intended to be the high-performance version of the model range, all R models were fitted with the highest performance engines of the line up, and were available in both front-wheel and all-wheel drive with either an automatic or manual transmission. A redesigned suspension with lower ride height and firmer shocks was standard. Three different versions were produced, depending on the model year.

For 1998, the R was available in six (Note: 019 'Black', 417 'Nautic Blue'/'Royal Blue', 418 'Regent Red', 426 'Mystic Silver', 428 'Coral Red', 435 'Saffron') (Note: 019 'Black', 417 'Nautic Blue'/'Royal Blue', 418 'Regent Red', 426 'Mystic Silver', 428 'Coral Red', 435 'Saffron') colours: Black Stone, Nautic Blue, Silver Metallic, Coral Red, Regency Red, Saffron. All, apart from the first one, were metallic or pearl paints with Saffron only available for the V70 R. Versions offered included FWD and an AWD, both with either a 4-speed automatic or 5-speed manual transmission. Cars with the automatic transmission were rated at 240 PS (177 kW; 237 hp), while manual transmission cars were equipped with a bigger turbo increasing power output to 250 PS (184 kW; 247 hp) and torque to 350 N⋅m (258 lb⋅ft). The FWD manual transmission equipped R featured a viscous based limited-slip differential. In the US neither FWD nor manual transmissions were offered. (Note: Available interior colours: 3866 'Light Beige', 3876 'Grey')

For 1999, the R was available in eight (Note: 019 'Black', 417 'Nautic Blue'/'Royal Blue', 421 'Emerald Green'/'Dark Olive Green', 426 'Mystic Silver', 436 'Cassis Metallic', 441 'Laser Blue', 445 'Venetian Red', 601 'Classic Red') (Note: 019 'Black', 417 'Nautic Blue'/'Royal Blue', 421 'Olive Green', 426 'Mystic Silver', 436 'Cassis Metallic', 441 'Laser Blue', 445 'Venetian Red', 601 'Classic Red') colours: Black Stone, Classic Red, Nautic Blue Pearl, Silver Metallic, Cassis, Venetian Red Pearl, Dark Olive Green, Laser Blue. All except the first two were metallic or pearl paints with Laser Blue only being available on the R. FWD and manual transmission versions were discontinued, only AWD in combination with a 4-speed automatic were available. Cars were badged V70 R AWD. Power was increased to 250 PS. Blue engine covers were introduced for R models. (Note: Available interior colours: 3866 'Light Beige', 3876 'Grey')

For 2000, the R was available in six (Note: 019 'Black', 417 'Nautic Blue'/'Royal Blue', 421 'Emerald Green'/'Dark Olive Green', 426 'Mystic Silver', 441 'Laser Blue', 445 'Venetian Red') (Note: 019 'Black', 417 'Nautic Blue'/'Royal Blue', 426 'Mystic Silver', 441 'Laser Blue') colours: Black Stone, Nautic Blue Pearl, Silver Metallic, Venetian Red Pearl, Dark Olive Green, Laser Blue. All, apart from the first one, were metallic or pearl paints with Laser Blue only being available on the R. A new 2.4L engine was introduced and power increased to 265 PS (195 kW; 261 hp) by use of a larger turbo and variable valve timing (VVT). The newly introduced 5-speed adaptive automatic was offered, but some markets such as Australia, New Zealand and Singapore received the 4-speed auto as used in the 98–99 MY. The rear brakes were upgraded to vented discs unique to the R. A dual outlet exhaust (a first for Volvo) was fitted as standard, with the rear bumper modified to accommodate it. Aerodynamic changes included a reshaped front spoiler with supple black lower air intakes together with recessed spotlights plus a shaped spoiler running the length of the tailgate. The interior could be ordered in a two-tone design which paired white Alcantara and black leather for the seat covers. (Note: Available interior colours: 3866 'Light Beige', 3876 'Grey', 3877 'Dark Grey/Oak')

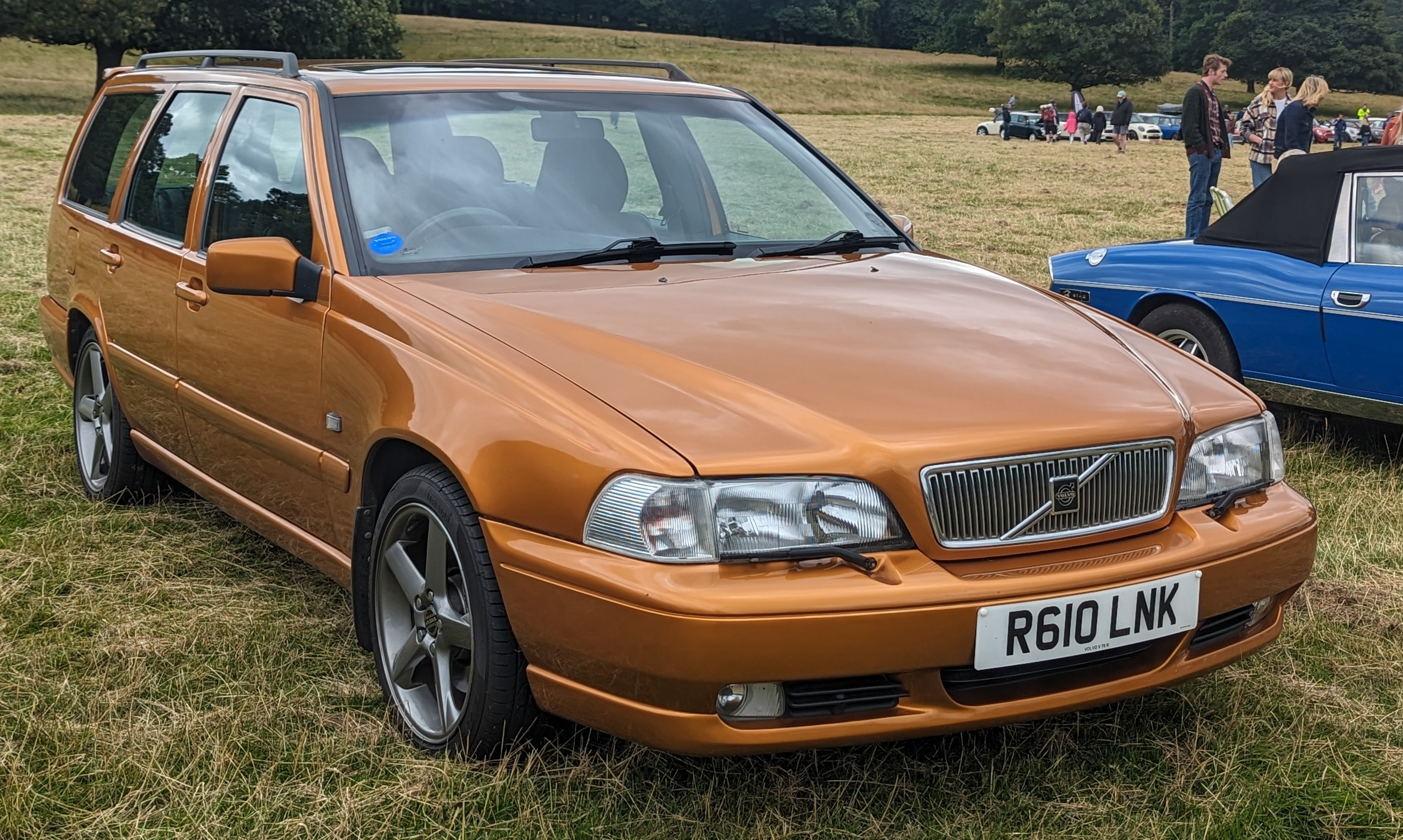
Volvo V70 R (UK)

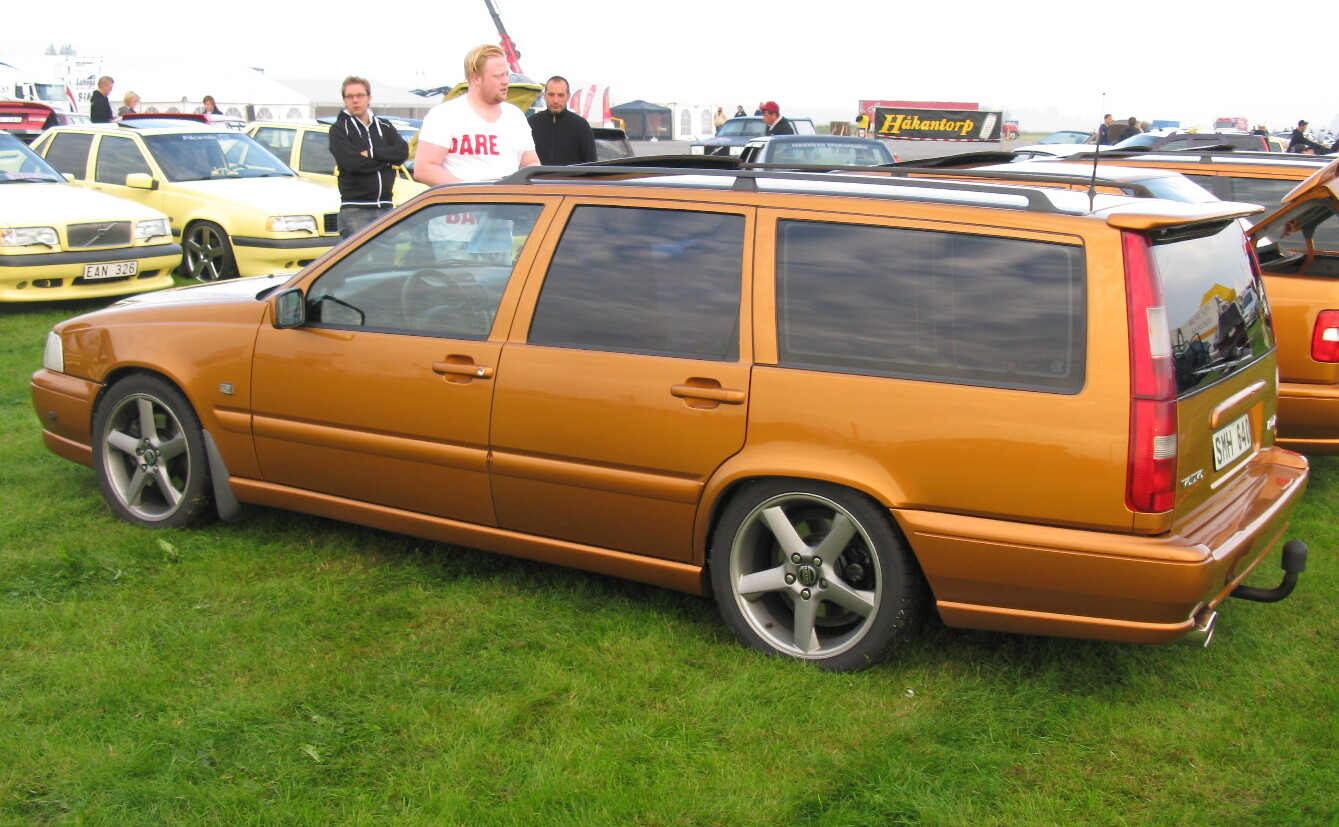
Volvo V70 R (Sweden)

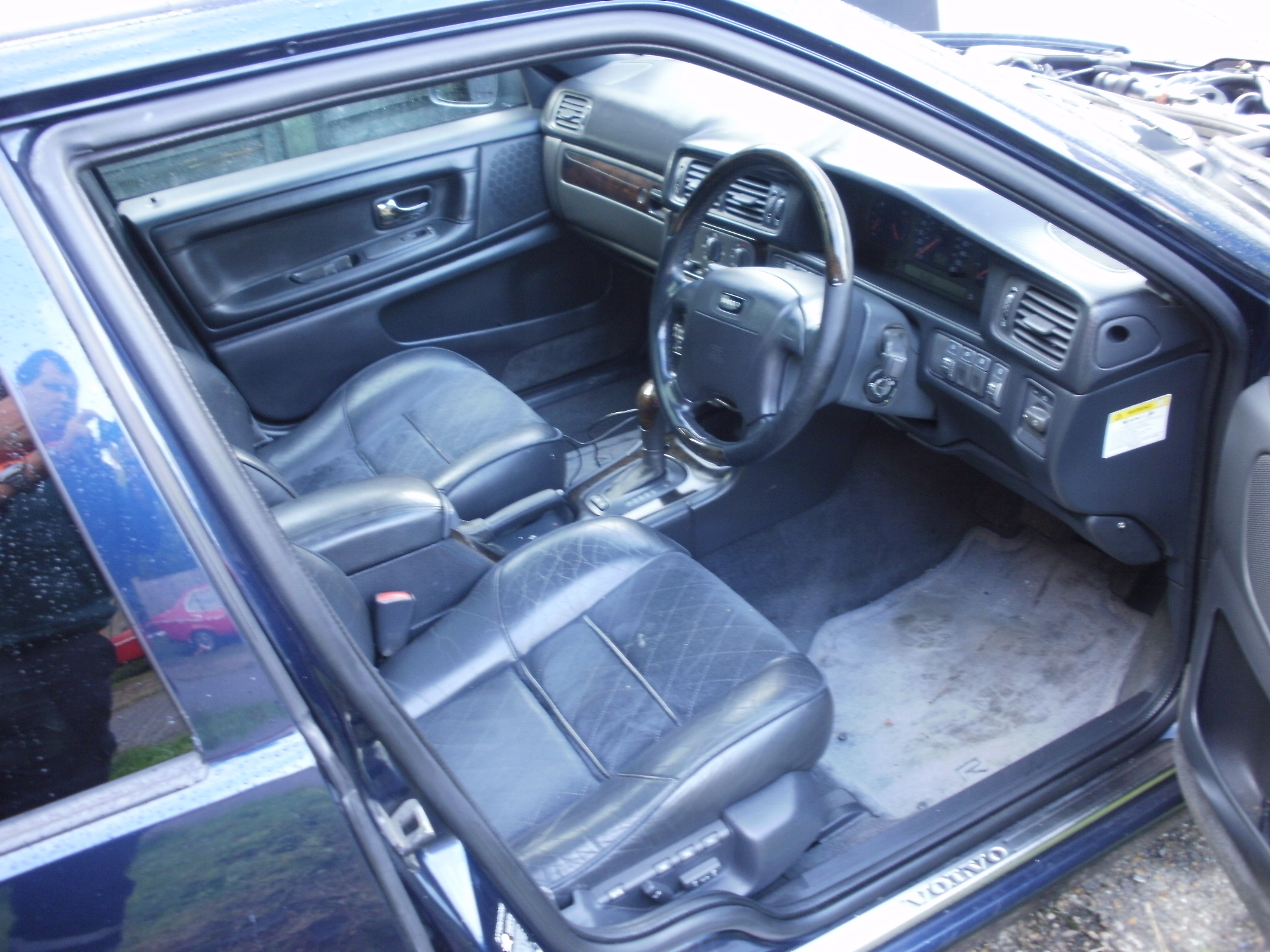
V70 R interior (UK)

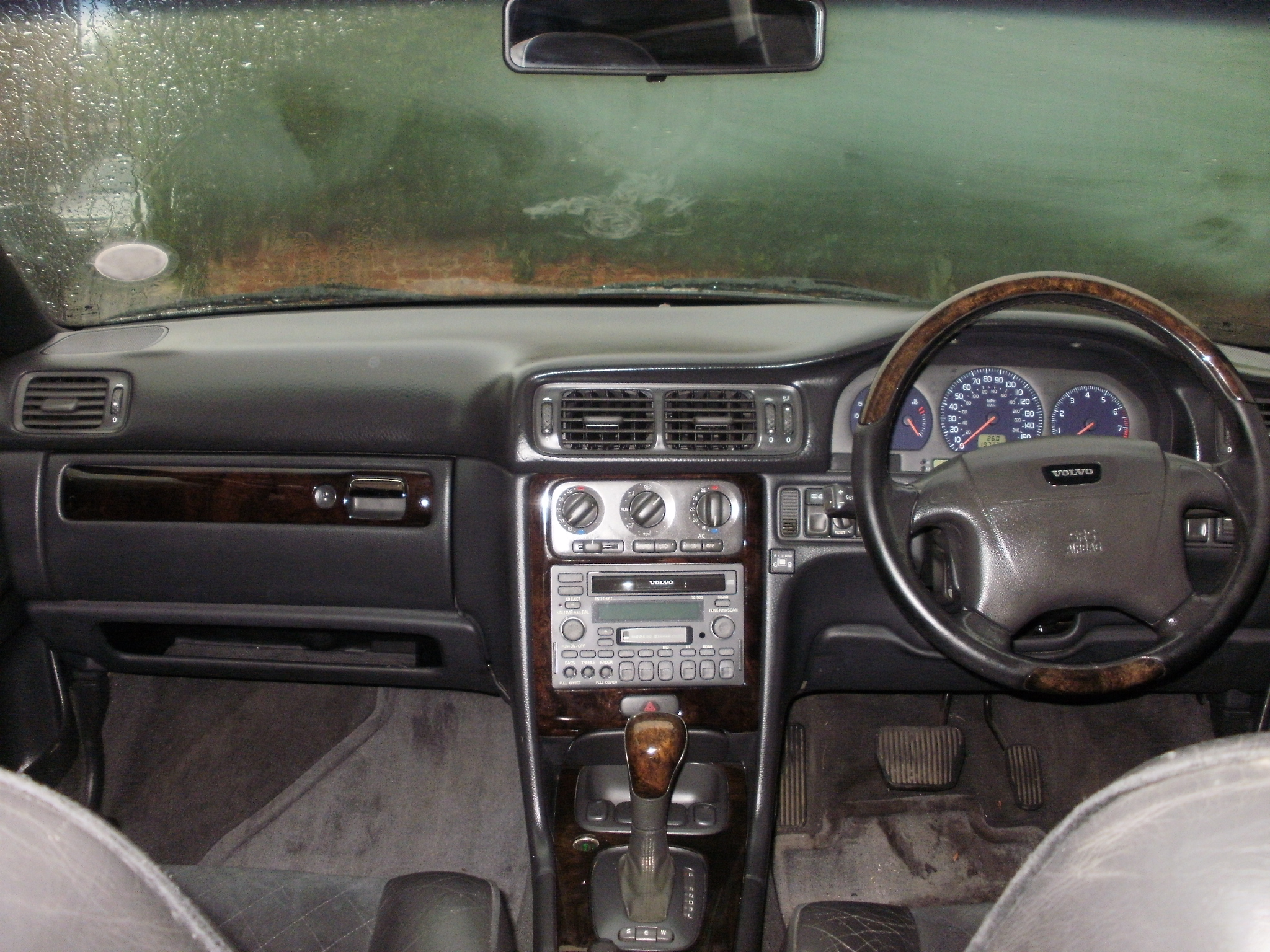
V70 R interior showing blue faced gauges (UK)

=== Engines ===
Engines for the first generation all had five cylinders. The petrol versions were part of the Volvo Modular Engine family, the diesel engines were purchased from VAG.

Petrol engines
Model	Engine code	Year(s)	Power	Torque at rpm	Displacement	0–100 km/h (0–62 mph)
2.0 10V	B5202FS	1997–1998	126 PS (93 kW; 124 hp)	170 N⋅m (125 lb⋅ft) at 4800	2.0 L (1,984 cc)	11.9 s (Manual); 12.5 s (Auto)
2.5 10V	B5252FS	1997–1999	144 PS (106 kW; 142 hp)	206 N⋅m (152 lb⋅ft) at 3300	2.4 L (2,435 cc)	10.4 s (Manual); 10.8 s (Auto)
2.5 20V	B5254FS	1997–1999	170 PS (125 kW; 168 hp)	220 N⋅m (162 lb⋅ft) at 3300	2.4 L (2,435 cc)	9.2 s (Manual); 10.2 s (Auto)
2.5 20V	B5254S	1999	170 PS (125 kW; 168 hp)	220 N⋅m (162 lb⋅ft) at 3300	2.4 L (2,435 cc)	8.9 s (Manual); 10.0 s (Auto)
2.4	B5244S2	2000	140 PS (103 kW; 138 hp)	220 N⋅m (162 lb⋅ft) at 3750	2.4 L (2,435 cc)	10.1 s (Manual); 11.1 s (Auto)
2.4	B5244S	2000	170 PS (125 kW; 168 hp)	230 N⋅m (170 lb⋅ft) at 4800	2.4 L (2,435 cc)	9.0 s (Manual); 10.0 s (Auto)
2.0T	B5204T2	1997–2000	180 PS (132 kW; 178 hp)	220 N⋅m (162 lb⋅ft) at 1800	2.0 L (1,984 cc)	9.4 s (Manual); 10.1 s (Auto)
2.5T; 2.5T AWD (Note: Available for the V70 XC)	B5254T	1997–1999	193 PS (142 kW; 190 hp)	270 N⋅m (199 lb⋅ft) at 1800	2.4 L (2,435 cc)	7.8 s (Manual); 8.2 s (Auto); 8.7 s (Manual AWD); 9.1 s (Auto AWD)
2.4T; 2.4T AWD	B5244T	2000	193 PS (142 kW; 190 hp)	270 N⋅m (199 lb⋅ft) at 1600	2.4 L (2,435 cc)	8.0 s (Manual); 8.4 s (Auto); 8.5 s (Manual AWD); 8.9 s (Auto AWD)
T5 2.0	B5204T3	1997–2000	225 PS (165 kW; 222 hp)	310 N⋅m (229 lb⋅ft) at 2700	2.0 L (1,984 cc)	7.8 s (Manual); 7.9 s (Auto)
T5 2.3	B5234T3	1997–2000	240 PS (177 kW; 237 hp)	330 N⋅m (243 lb⋅ft) at 2700	2.3 L (2,319 cc)	7.1 s (Manual); 7.4 s (Auto)
R (Manual); R AWD (Manual)	B5234T4	1998	250 PS (184 kW; 247 hp)	350 N⋅m (258 lb⋅ft) at 2400	2.3 L (2,319 cc)	6.8 s (FWD); 7.3 s (AWD)
R (Auto)	B5234T3	1998	240 PS (177 kW; 237 hp)	330 N⋅m (243 lb⋅ft) at 2700	2.3 L (2,319 cc)	7.4 s (Auto FWD)
R AWD (Auto)	B5234T6	1998	240 PS (177 kW; 237 hp)	310 N⋅m (229 lb⋅ft) at 2400	2.3 L (2,319 cc)	8.1 s (Auto AWD)
R AWD (Auto)	B5234T8	1999	250 PS (184 kW; 247 hp)	350 N⋅m (258 lb⋅ft) at 2400	2.3 L (2,319 cc)	7.9 s (Auto AWD)
R AWD (Auto)	B5244T2	2000	265 PS (195 kW; 261 hp)	400 N⋅m (295 lb⋅ft) at 2500	2.4 L (2,435 cc)	7.4 s (Auto AWD)

Diesel engines
Model	Engine code	Year(s)	Power	Torque at rpm	Displacement	0–100 km/h (0–62 mph)
2.5 D (Note: Volvo used a modified version of the 2.5 TDI Audi engine) (TDI)	D5252T MSA 15.7	1997–1999	140 PS (103 kW; 138 hp)	290 N⋅m (214 lb⋅ft) at 1900	2.5 L (2,460 cc)	10.2 s (Manual); 11.0 s (Auto)
2.5 D (TDI)	D5252T MSA 15.8	1999–2000	140 PS (103 kW; 138 hp)	290 N⋅m (214 lb⋅ft) at 1900	2.5 L (2,460 cc)	10.2 s (Manual); 11.0 s (Auto)

Gas
Model	Engine code	Year(s)	Power	Tourqe at rpm	Displacement	0–100 km/h (0–62 mph)
Bi-Fuel	GB5252S	1997–1998	Petrol: 144 PS (106 kW; 142 hp); Gas: 122 PS (90 kW; 120 hp)	Petrol: 206 N⋅m (152 lb⋅ft) at 3600; Gas: 180 N⋅m (133 lb⋅ft) at 3600	2.4 L (2,435 cc)	10.8 s (Petrol); 14.1 s (Gas)
Bi-Fuel	GB5252S2	1999	Petrol: 144 PS (106 kW; 142 hp); Gas: 122 PS (90 kW; 120 hp)	Petrol: 206 N⋅m (152 lb⋅ft) at 3600; Gas: 180 N⋅m (133 lb⋅ft) at 3650	2.4 L (2,435 cc)	10.8 s (Petrol); 14.1 s (Gas)
Bi-Fuel; CNG	B5244SG	2000	140 PS (103 kW; 138 hp)	Petrol: 220 N⋅m (160 lb⋅ft) at 3750; Gas: 192 N⋅m (142 lb⋅ft) at 4500	2.4 L (2,435 cc)	9.9 s (Manual); 10.7 s (Auto)
Bi-Fuel; LPG	B5244SG2	2000	140 PS (103 kW; 138 hp)	Petrol: 220 N⋅m (160 lb⋅ft) at 3750; Gas: 214 N⋅m (158 lb⋅ft) at 4500	2.4 L (2,435 cc)	9.9 s (Manual); 10.7 s (Auto)

=== Safety ===
A driver airbag was standard on all V70 models, depending on the market a front passenger airbag was either always included or a no-cost option. Buyers could choose to not have a passenger airbag to be able to install a forward facing child seat. Seatbelt pretensioners, with load limiters, for both driver and front passenger were always part of the standard equipment. Side Impact Protection System (SIPS) was standard on all V70 models. Standard side airbags incorporated into the front seats supplemented the system.

Euro NCAP evaluated the S70 (saloon variant of V70) in 1998 awarding it four out of four stars for adult occupant protection. The S70 scored seven of 16 points in the front test and 16 of 16 in the side test. The car received two of two points available in the pole test. The S70 received a total of 25 of 37 points and therefore four stars (25–32) in Euro NCAP's evaluation.

The S70 scored five out of five stars for front impact protection for driver and front passenger in the U.S. National Highway Traffic Safety Administration (NHTSA) safety testing, and four out of five stars for driver and rear passenger side impact protection.

The Insurance Institute for Highway Safety (IIHS) granted the 850/S70 their highest rating of "good" for front crash protection. Rear crash protection was rated as "good". The 1999 model year and later vehicles minimized or prevented whiplash with an energy absorbing seatback hinge mechanism that is standard equipment.

== Second generation (2000–2007) ==
Second generation
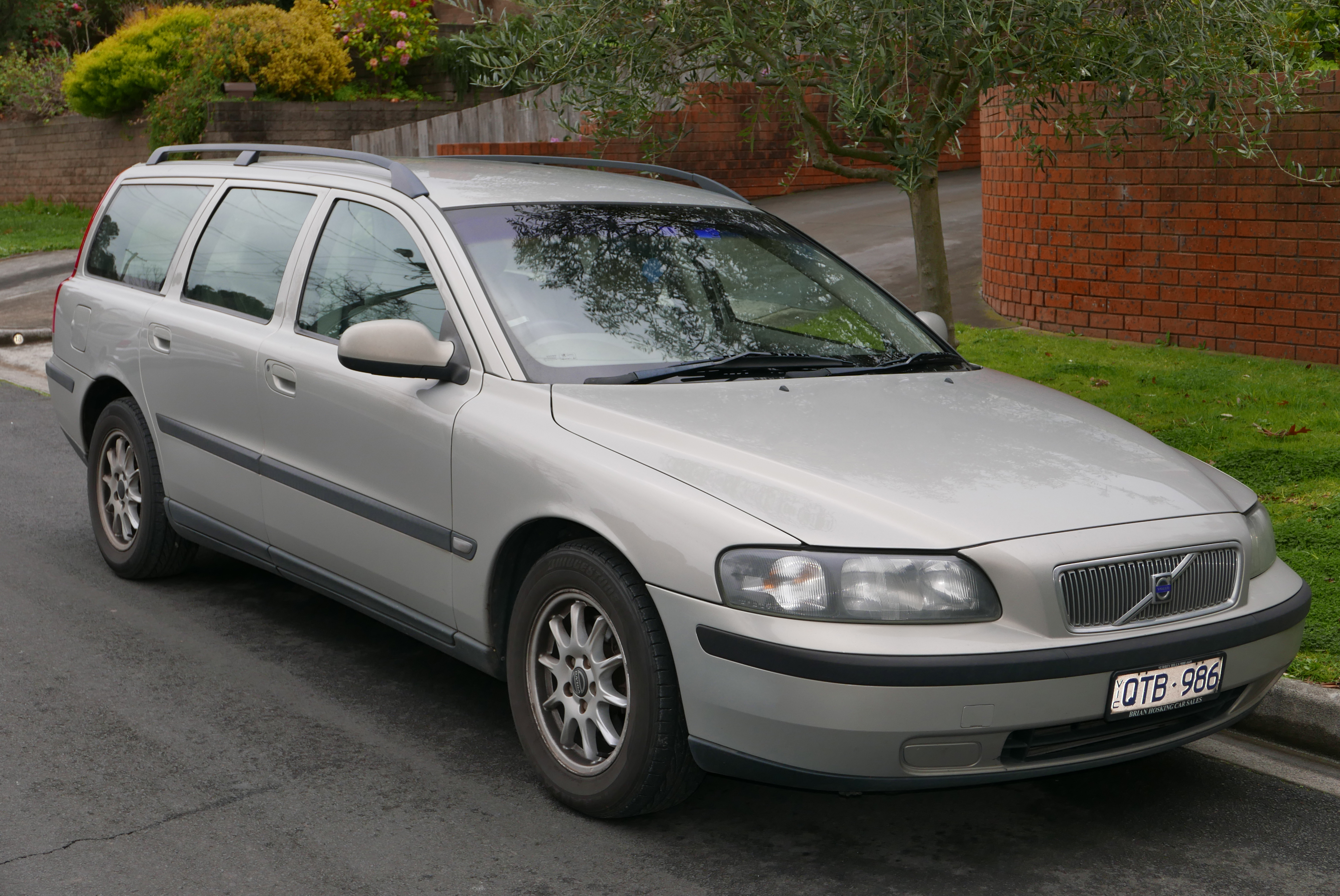
- 2001 Volvo V70 (Australia)

Overview
- Also called: Volvo V70 XC (2000–2002); Volvo Cross Country (2000–2002) (Australia); Volvo XC70 (2003–2007)
- Production: January 2000–2007
- Model years: 2000–2008 (V70); 2000–2003 (V70 XC); 2003–2008 (XC70); 2003–2007 (V70 R)
- Assembly: Sweden: Torslanda (Torslandaverken); Belgium: Ghent (VCG); Malaysia: Shah Alam (SMA); Thailand: Samut Prakan
- Designer: Peter Horbury; Örjan Sterner (V70 exterior); Stefan Jansson (XC exterior)

Body and chassis
- Platform: Volvo P2 platform
- Related: Volvo S60; Volvo S80

Powertrain
- Engine: Petrol; 2.0–2.5 I5; Bi-Fuel; 2.4 I5; Diesel; 2.4 I5 (Volvo); 2.5 I5 (VW)
- Transmission: Manual; 5-speed Volvo M56 / Volvo M58; 6-speed Volvo M66; Automatic; 5-speed Aisin AW55-50/51SN; 6-speed Aisin TF-80SC

Dimensions
- Wheelbase: 2,756 mm (108.5 in); XC: 2,764 mm (108.8 in)
- Length: 4,709 mm (185.4 in); XC: 4,732 mm (186.3 in)
- Width: 1,803 mm (71.0 in); XC: 1,859 mm (73.2 in)
- Height: 2000–2003: 1,491 mm (58.7 in); 2003–2007: 1,466 mm (57.7 in); XC: 1,562 mm (61.5 in); R AWD: 1,448 mm (57.0 in)
- Curb weight: V70: 1,505–1,645 kg (3,318–3,627 lb); V70 XC / XC70: 1,690–1,735 kg (3,726–3,825 lb); V70 R AWD: 1,740–1,770 kg (3,836–3,902 lb)

Chronology
- Successor: Volvo V60

Volvo released the second generation V70 to most markets in early 2000, and for the 2001 model year in North America. Based on the Volvo P2 platform, the second generation shared major mechanical and styling commonality with the Volvo S60 saloon, offered frontal area of 2.23 m^{2} (2.67 yd^{2}) and a coefficient of drag of .30. The new generation featured adhesively bonded construction as opposed to spot welding in key areas, with Volvo claiming the new body to be 70 per cent more rigid than its predecessor. Critical aspects of the design for the second generation were completed before Ford acquired Volvo in 1999.

With a 4 cm (1.6 in) increase in width and height, a 5 cm (2.0 in) longer wheelbase, a slightly shorter overall length than its predecessor, and a slightly increased interior cargo volume, it went on sale in early 2000.

The interior featured raised seating in the second row, a hard point on the passenger's side of the center console to provide support for a range of optional accessories – e.g., an optional shopping bag holder. A rear-seat table, waste basket and cargo net were integrated into the rear seat backs. Standard interior features included a coat hook integrated into the side of the front passenger's headrest, glove compartment with pen holder and toll card, configurable center console and rear seating with a two-position backrest – one favoring cargo – the other favoring comfort.

All P2 platform Volvos received a minor facelift across all markets for 2005. The front fascia was redesigned, tail and head lamps were changed to clear covers, the center console and dashboard received detail changes. Some minor changes were made to the electrical system and some engines, such diesel engine models received a particle filter. A new 6-speed automatic transmission was introduced, available in both AWD and FWD configurations. Production of the second generation V70 and XC70 ended with the 2007 model year.

=== Styling ===
The second generation V70 was styled by British designer Peter Horbury, who said "the design challenge involved marrying sports car style at the front with the necessary limitations of a wagon back." More specifically, he described the concept as the "front end of a Jaguar E-Type married to the back end of a Ford Transit van."

The V70 of 2000 was the best combination of functionality on the back of the car, where you need it, and a very nice, elegant, sporty soft, voluptuous front that blended into that functionality – showing you can have both.

— Peter Horbury

=== V70 ===
A second generation V70 Bi-Fuel was made available. Liquefied petroleum gas (LPG) storage capacity was increased to a total of 100 litres (26 US gal), split into one 75 litres (20 US gal) tank and two 12.5-litre (3.3 US gal) litre tanks. Unlike previous models the tanks were installed on the underside of the car, keeping all of the trunk space available. Bi-Fuel models were only sold with the 2.4L (140PS) non-turbo engine, and a choice between a 5-speed manual or a 5-speed automatic transmission.

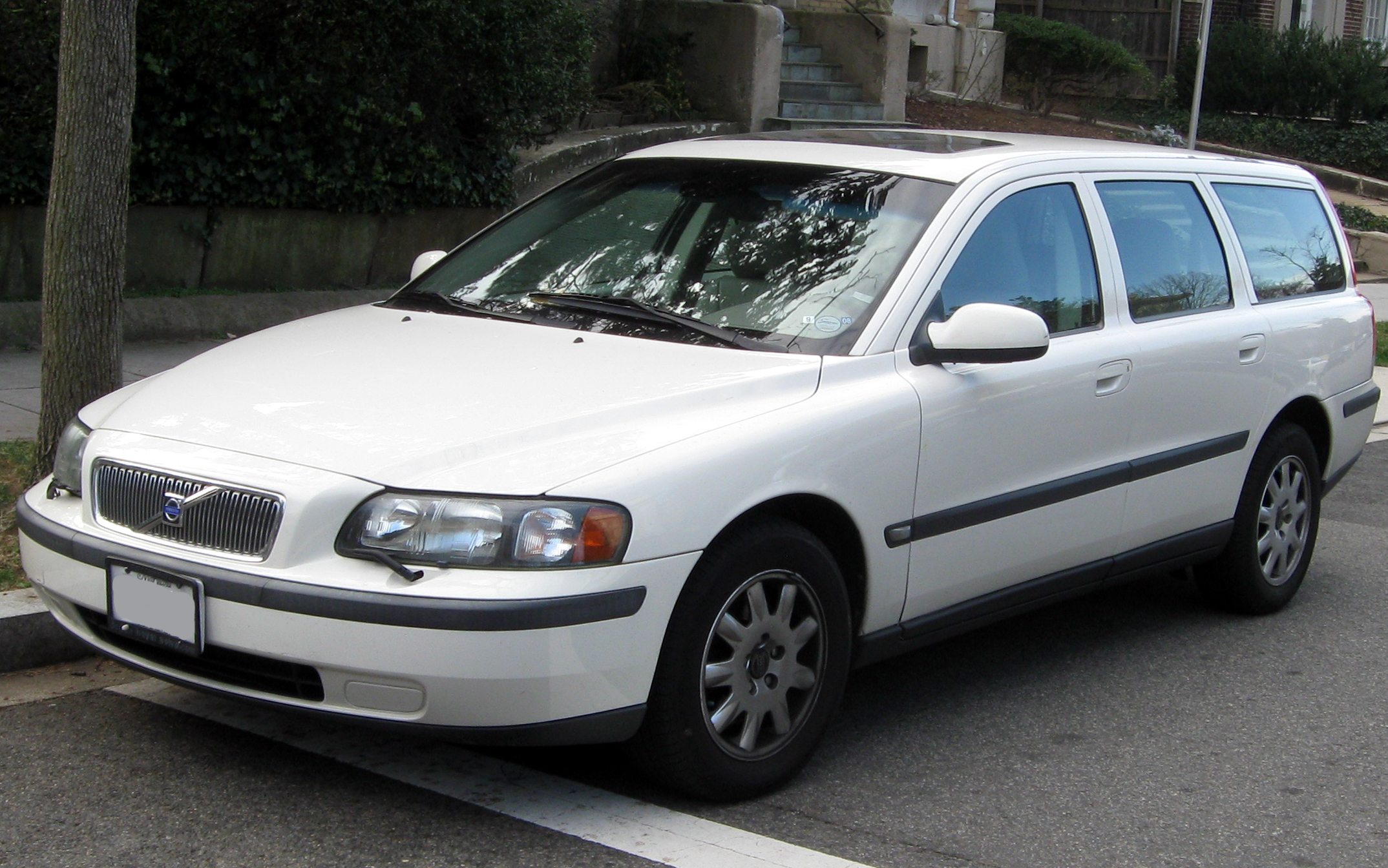
Volvo V70 pre-facelift (US)

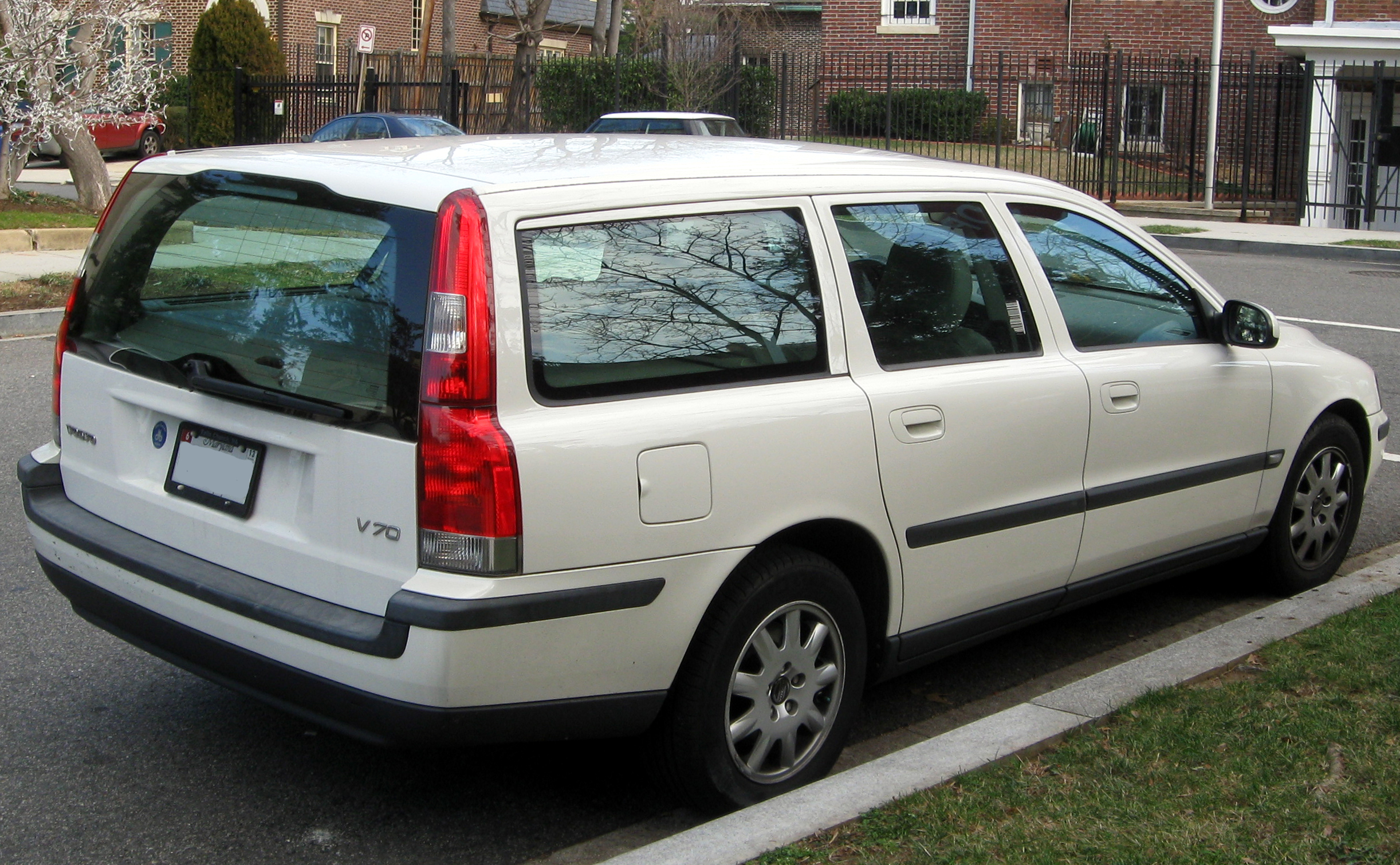
Volvo V70 pre-facelift (US)

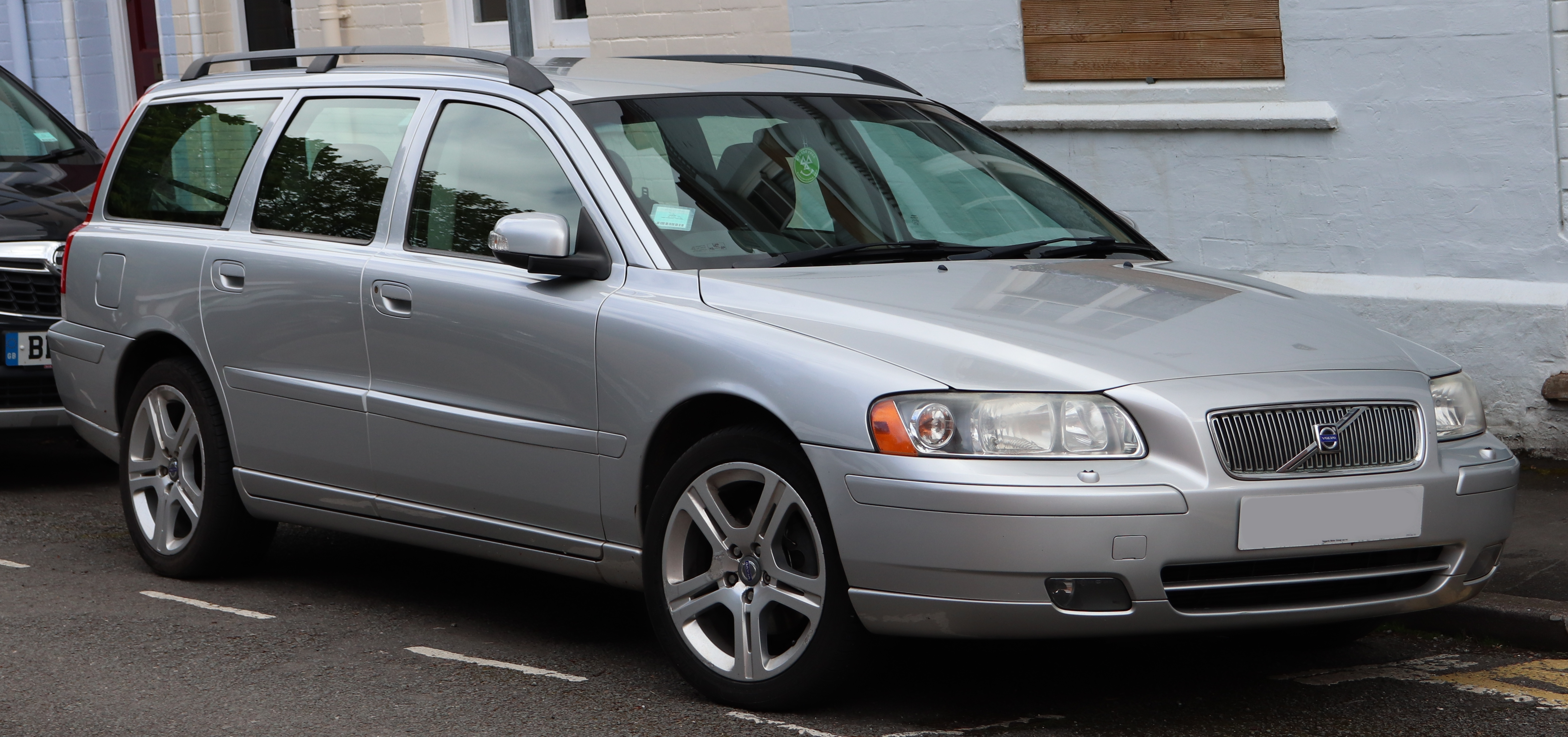
Volvo V70 post facelift (UK)

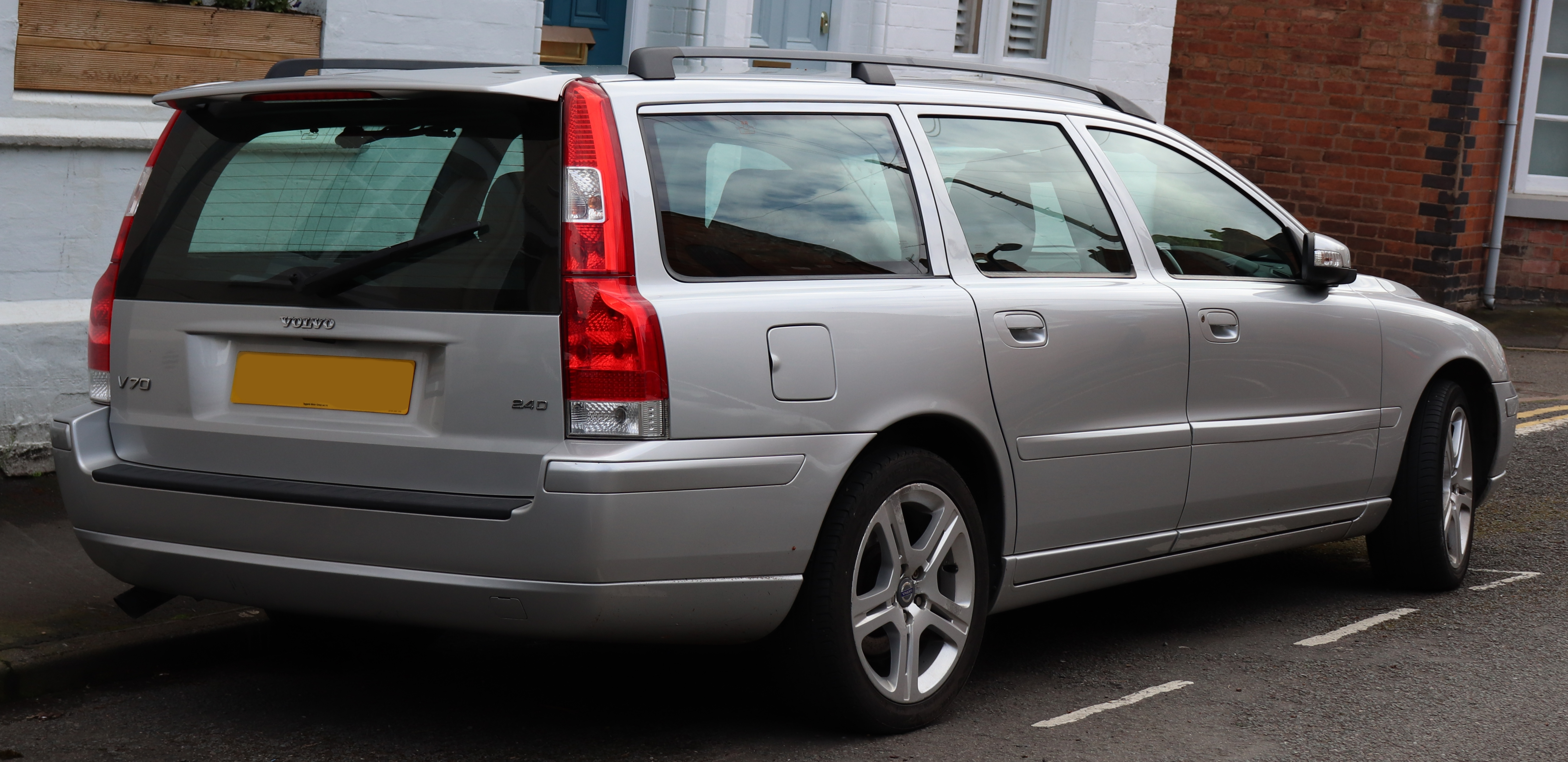
Volvo V70 post facelift (UK)

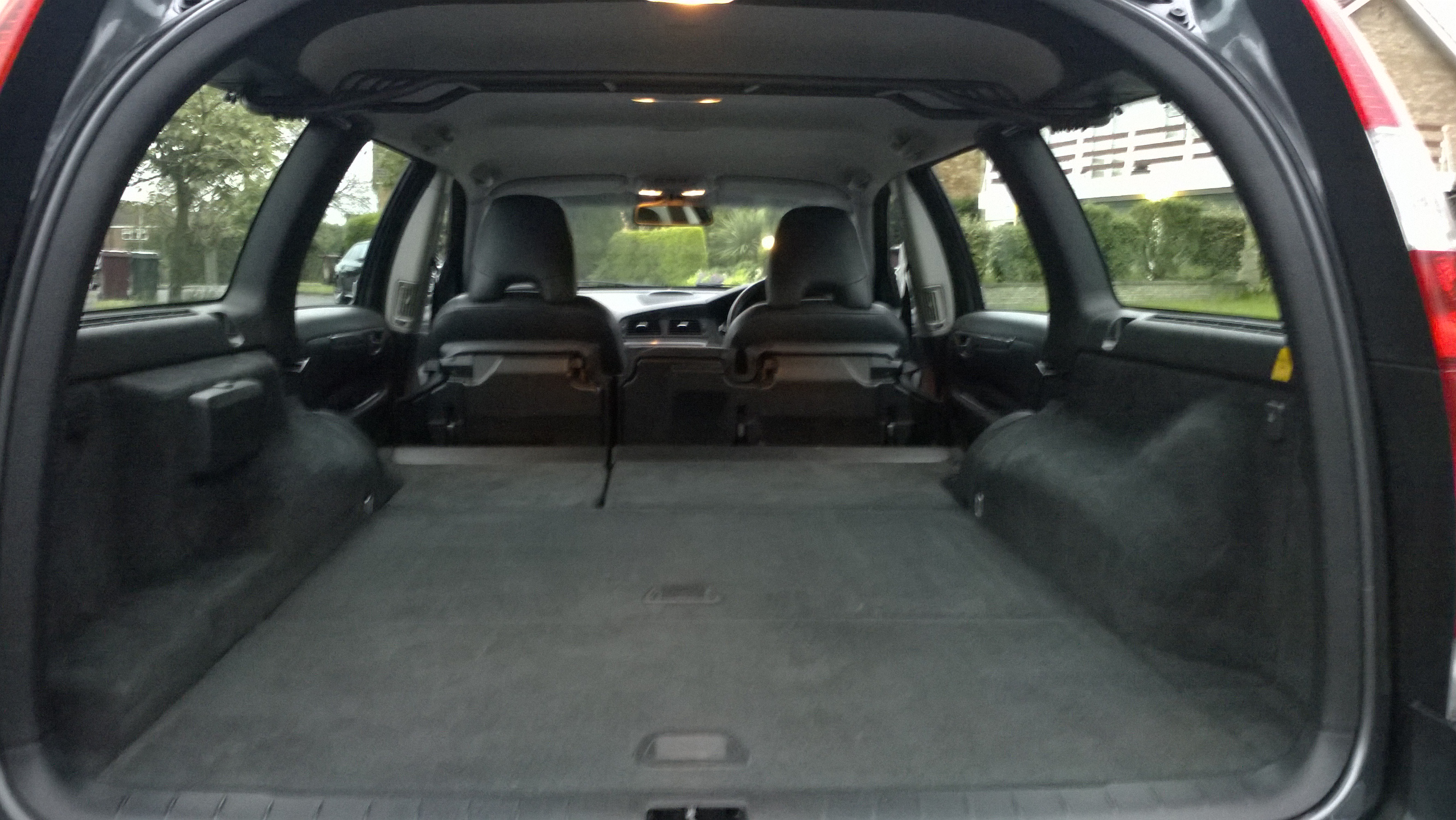
Volvo V70 load area with rear seats folded flat (UK)

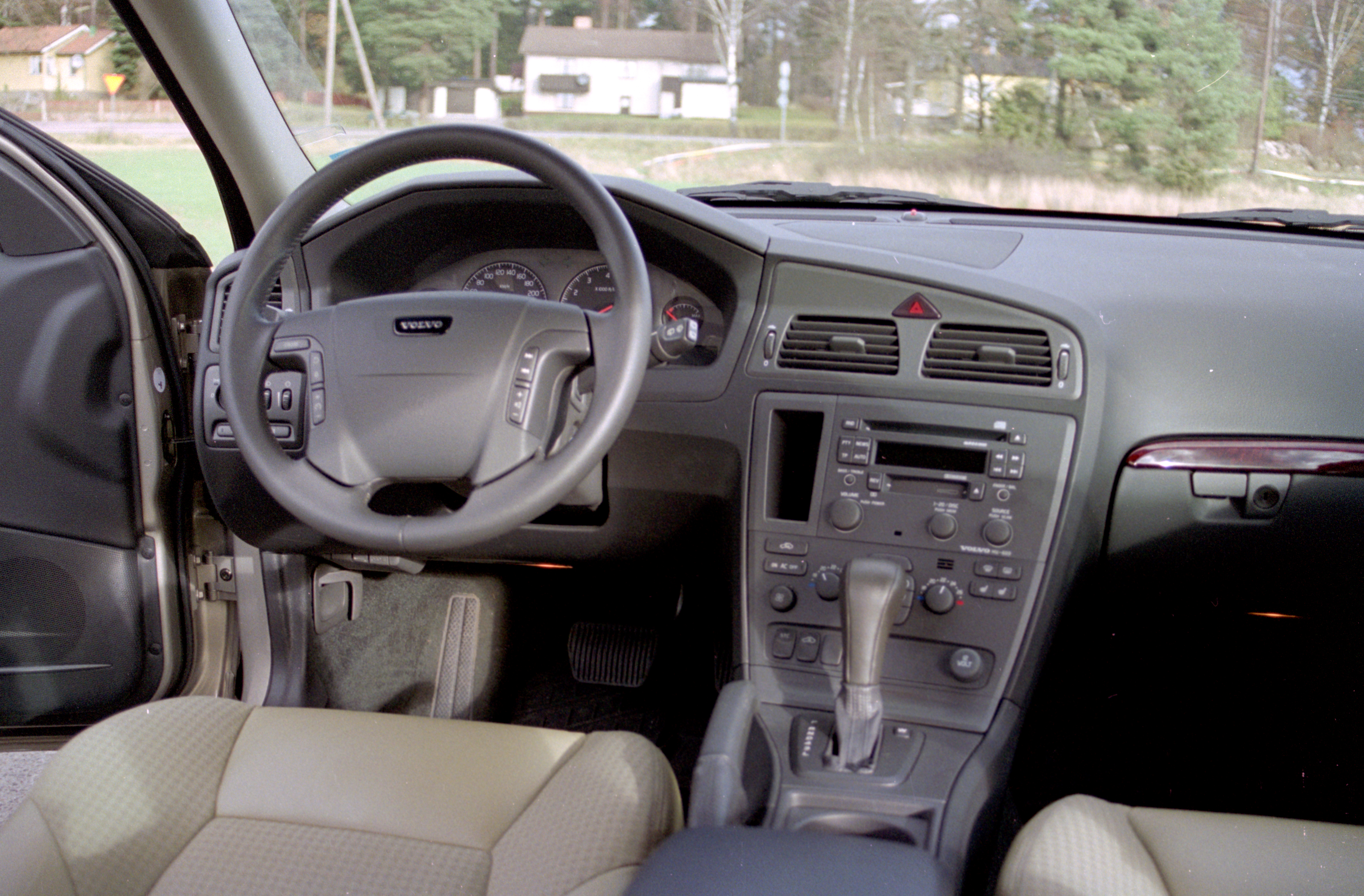
Volvo V70 Interior (Europe)

==== V70 XC / XC70 ====
At its introduction, the second generation V70 XC received a major upgrade. It featured better ground clearance of 8.2 in (210 mm) thanks to a raised suspension, different bodywork with unpainted bumpers and fender extensions, and AWD as standard. An interior grab handle for the front passenger was installed only on this model.

The V70 XC was larger in all dimensions, being 1 cm longer, 6 cm wider, and 7 cm taller. The front track was widened by 5 cm, to 161 cm, and the rear track was narrowed by 1 cm, to 155 cm.

Engine and gearbox choices were limited. Only the petrol 2.4L low pressure turbo, or the D5 diesel engine with either a 5-speed manual or 5-speed automatic transmission were available. No diesel version was offered for the North American market.

For 2003, the model was renamed the XC70, in keeping with Volvo's newly introduced XC90. Petrol 2.5L low pressure turbo engine replaced the 2.4L low pressure engine. As part of the 2005 facelift, the XC70 received model-specific rear view mirrors. These are larger and less rounded than the mirrors used on the V70, and were typically finished in matte black.

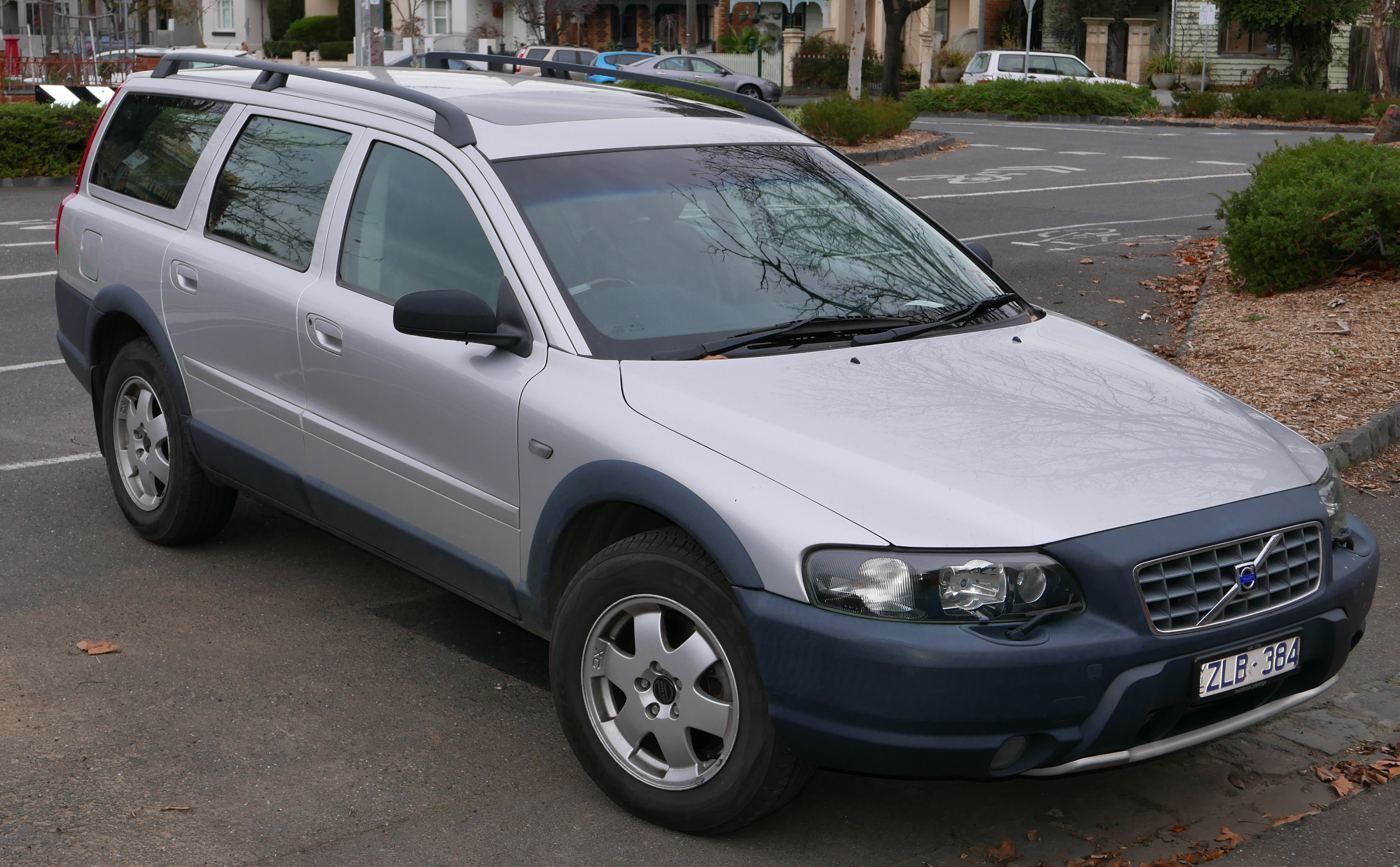
Volvo XC70 pre-facelift (Australia)

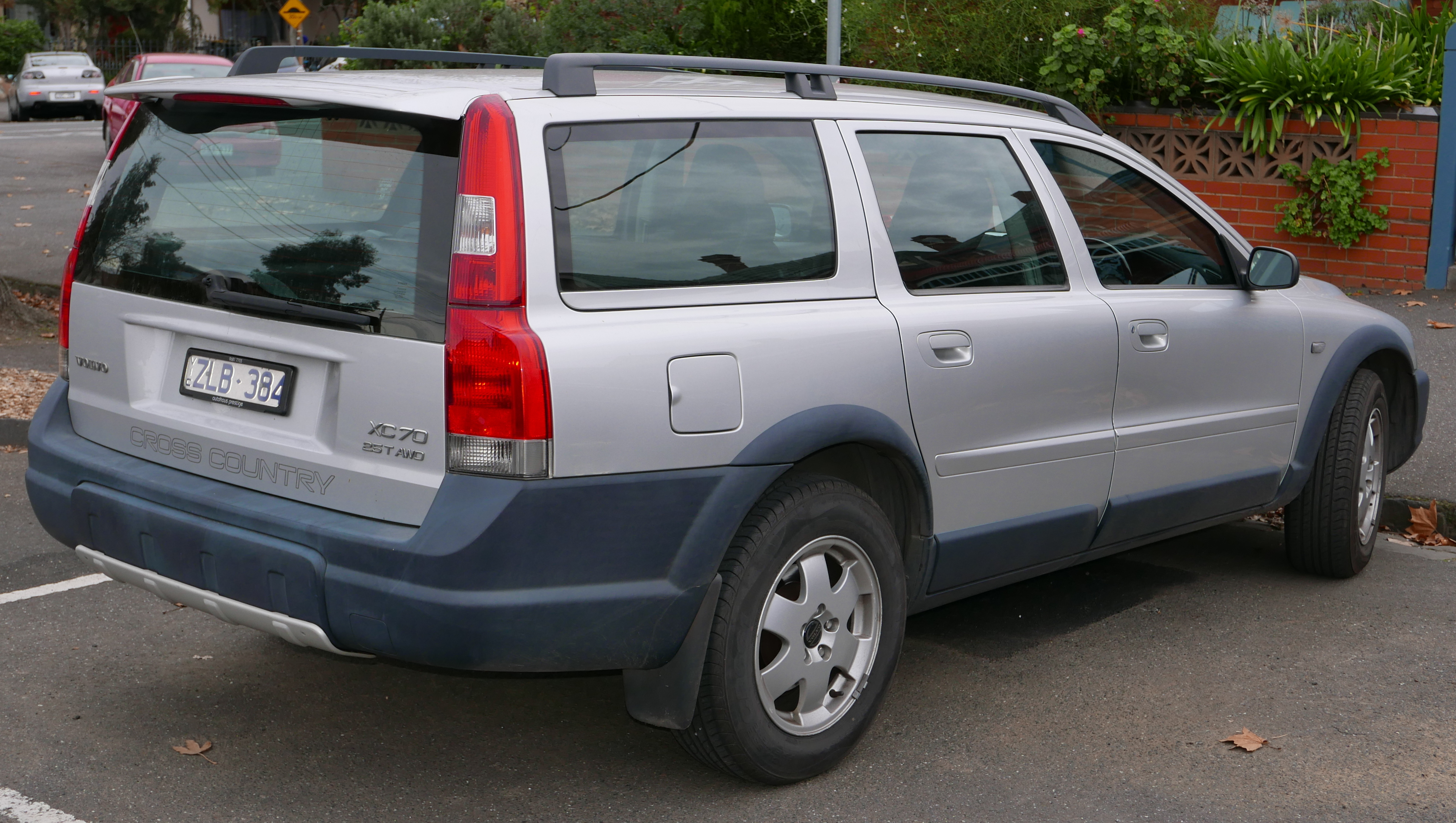
Volvo XC70 pre-facelift (Australia)

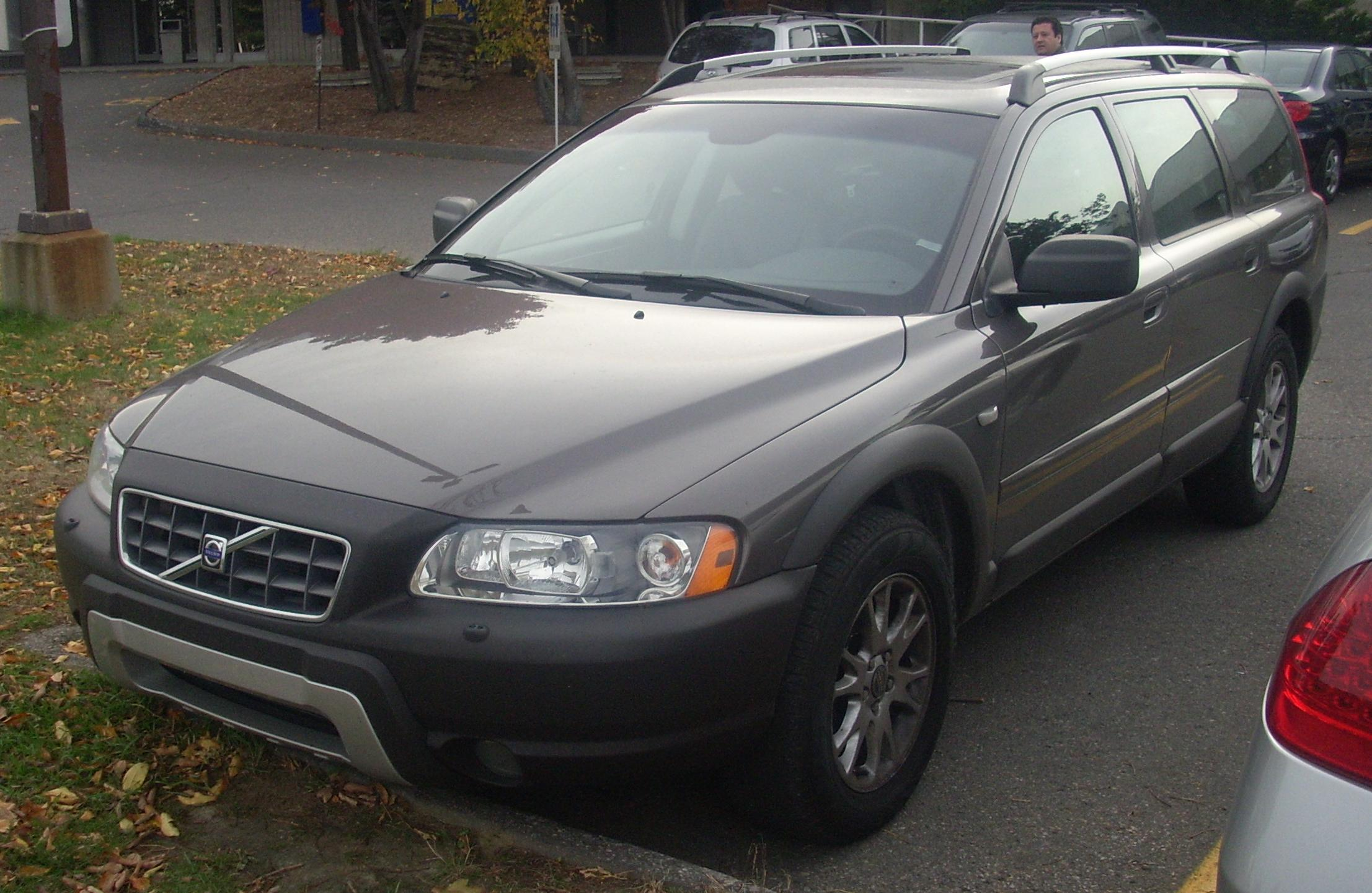
Volvo XC70 post facelift (Canada)

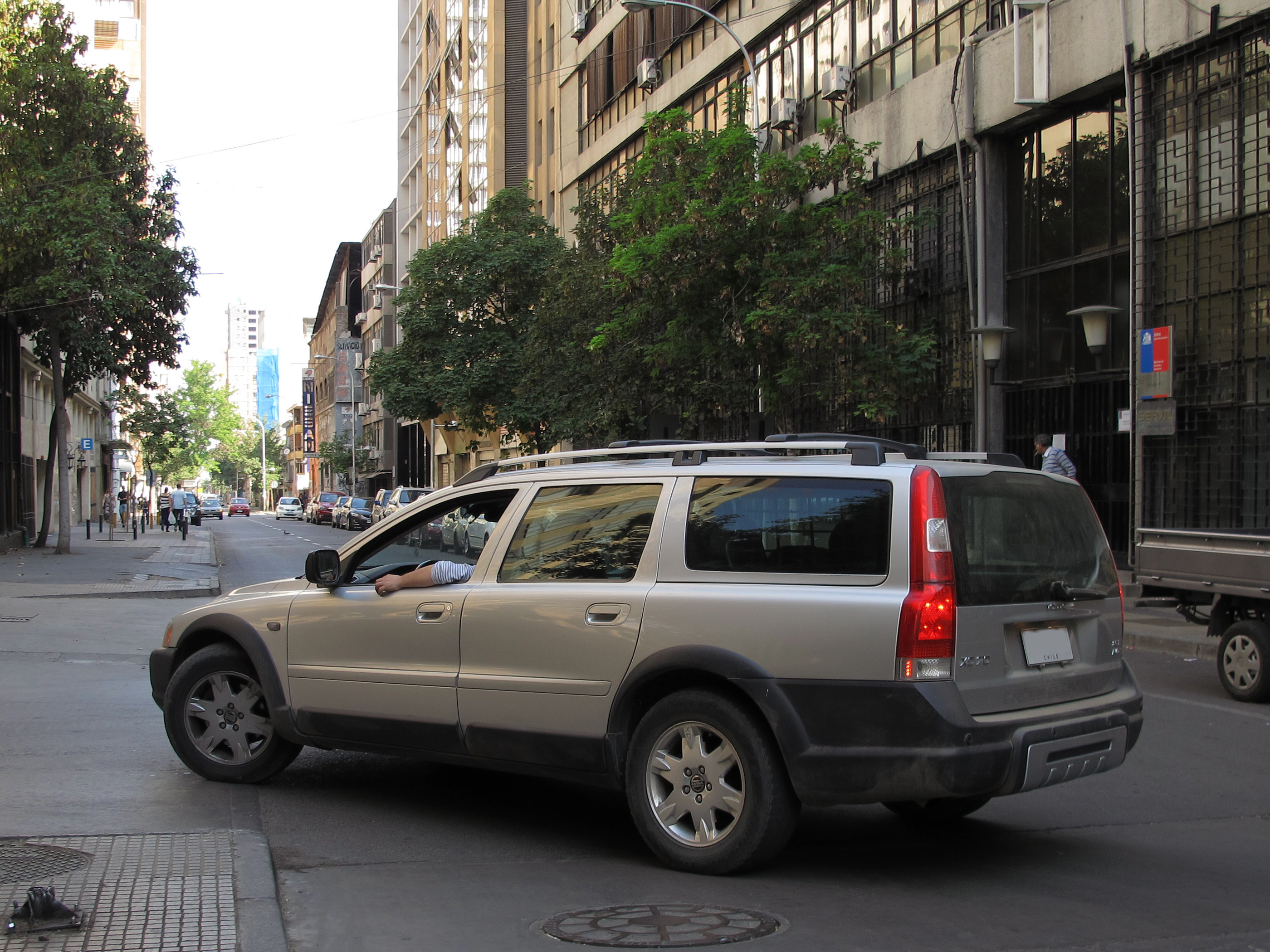
Volvo XC70 post facelift (Chile)

==== V70 / XC70 Ocean Race ====
In 2001, to mark their sponsorship of the just renamed Volvo Ocean Race, special Ocean Race editions of the V70 and V70 XC were announced. Released for the 2002 model year, the cars came painted only in a unique shade of blue. Silver exterior trim and roof rails, special Ocean Race floor mats as well as assorted badging, set the models apart from non-OR models.

To coincide with the 2005–2006 Volvo Ocean Race, Volvo revived the V70 and XC70 Ocean Race Editions. These were unveiled in early 2005, and once again were painted only in a unique shade of blue. They had upgraded standard equipment and special styling touches such as specific alloy wheels, blue interior trim, leather seats with contrast stitching and Ocean Race badges on the outside.

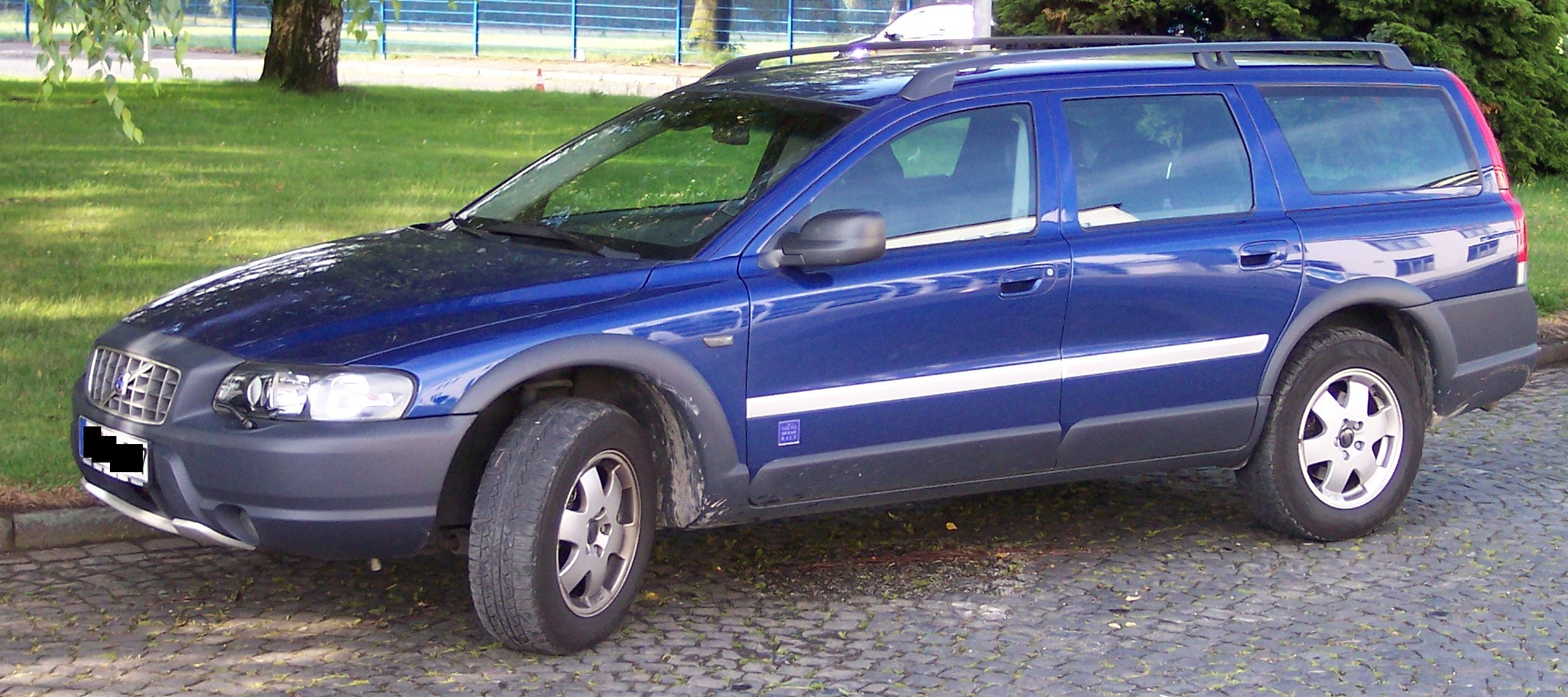
Volvo V70 XC Ocean Race pre-facelift (Germany)

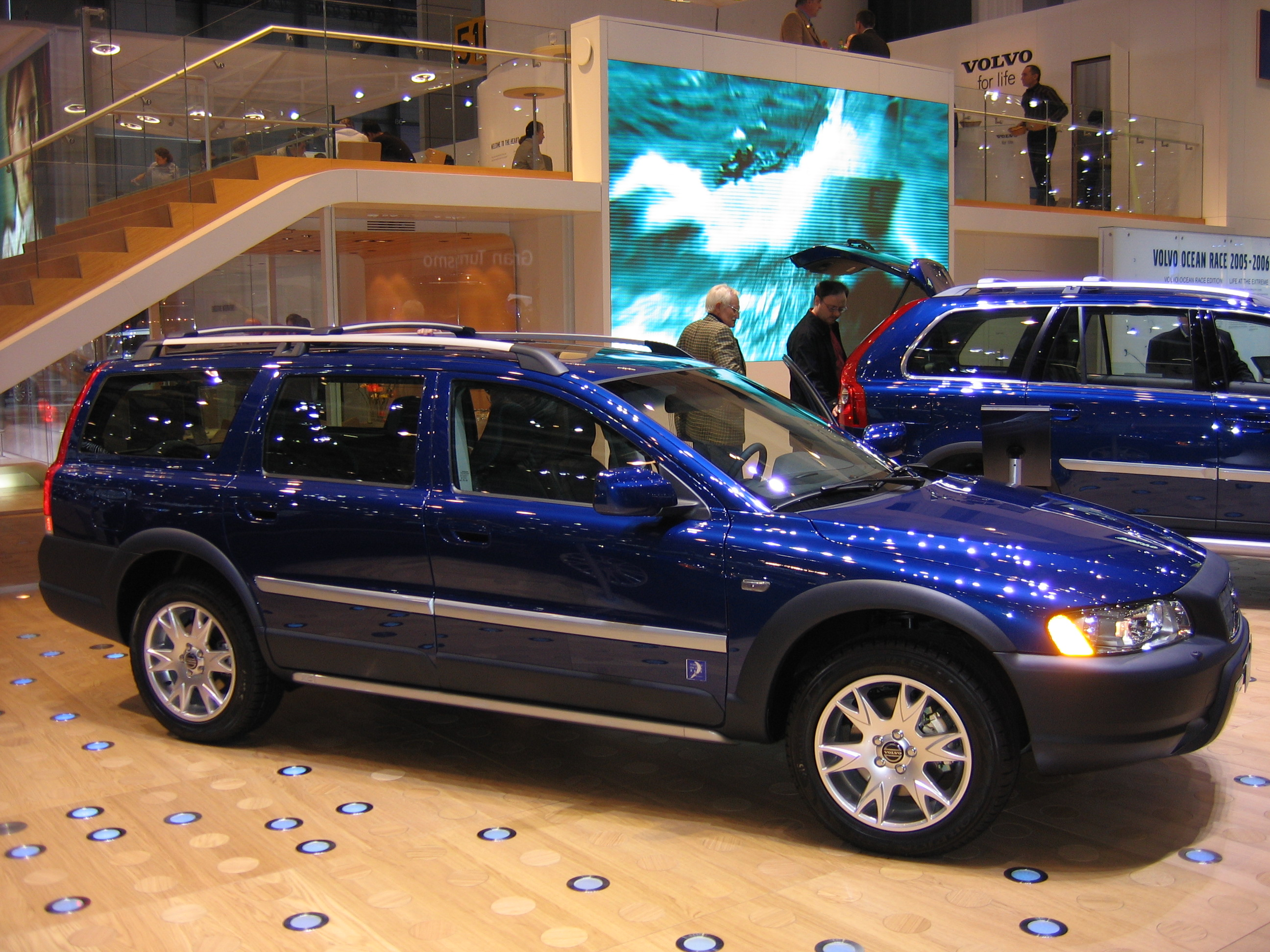
Volvo XC70 Ocean Race with 2005 VOR route displayed in the background.

==== V70 R ====
As with the previous generation, Volvo offered a high-performance variant called the V70 R AWD. Based on the PCC2 concept car from 2001, the model was unveiled at the 2002 Paris Motor Show on 26 September. Released in 2003, the model pioneered many firsts for Volvo. It was only available with a Haldex based all-wheel drive system and a 2.5L turbocharged five cylinder engine rated at 300 PS (221 kW; 296 hp) and 400 N⋅m (295 lbf⋅ft) of torque. This allowed for a 0–60 mph (0–97 km/h) time of 5.9 seconds. It had an electronically limited top speed of 250 km/h (155 mph). The R was available with a M66 six-speed manual or an Aisin AW55 five-speed automatic transmission. The 2005 facelift saw the five-speed automatic replaced by a more modern six-speed unit. Large brakes made by Brembo provided high-performance braking capabilities in line with the car's high-performance characteristics. The V70 R came as standard with Volvo's 4C multi-mode suspension developed with suspension experts Öhlins. The driver could choose from three different settings to vary the car's handling depending on driving style and conditions.

In a 2006 article titled "The Manwagon", The Wall Street Journal linked the V70R to a trend "to lure speed-crazy guys with kids," saying "car makers are trying to transform the dowdy old family hauler into something new," and that "consumer research had unearthed a surprising number of family men who thought wagons could be cool, if only they had more guts."

A total of 3407 V70Rs were shipped to North America: 2004–1,565; 2005–823; 2006–674; 2007–345.

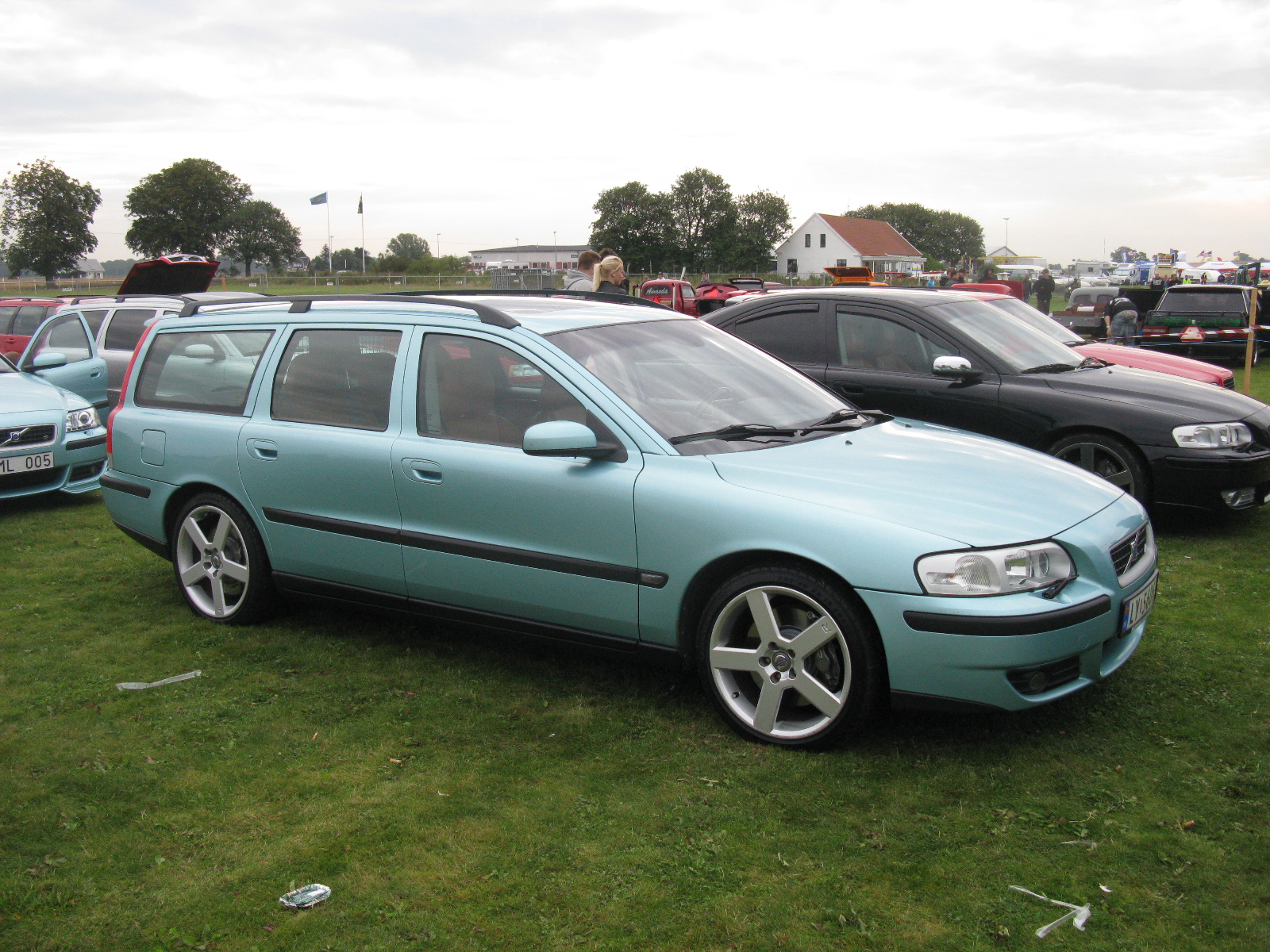
Volvo V70 R AWD pre-facelift (Sweden)

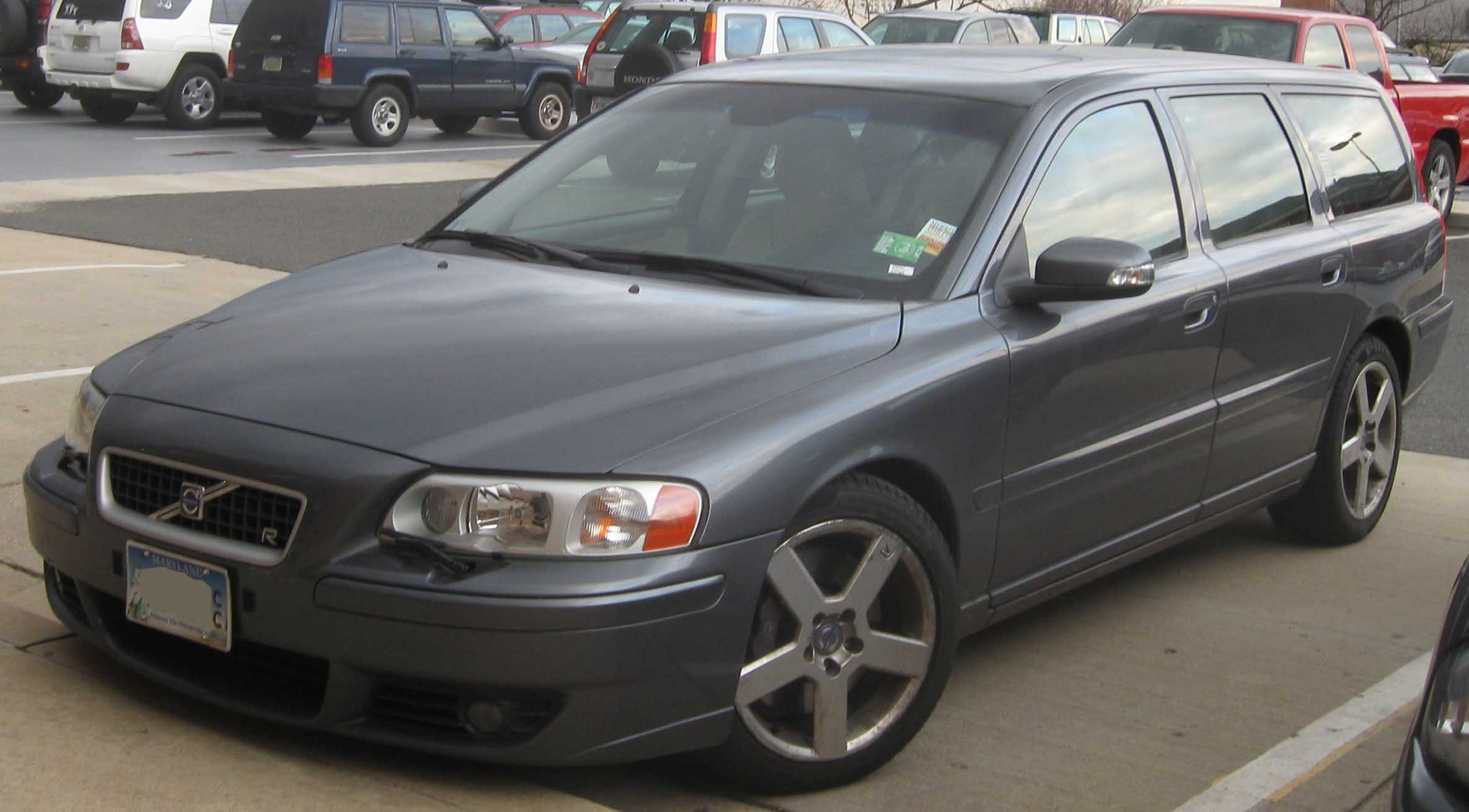
Volvo V70 R AWD post facelift (US)

=== Engines ===
Engines for the second generation all had five cylinders. The petrol versions were part of the Volvo Modular Engine family. Early model years still used a five-cylinder diesel purchased from VAG which was phased out in favour of Volvo's own five-cylinder diesel from the D5 Engine family.

Petrol engines
Model	Engine code	Year(s)	Power	Torque at rpm	Displacement	Comment
2.0T	B5204T	2000–2004	163 PS (120 kW; 161 hp)	240 N⋅m (177 lb⋅ft) at 2200–4800	1,984 cc (121.1 in^{3})	Inline 5 with low-pressure turbo
2.0T	B5204T5	2000–2007	180 PS (132 kW; 178 hp)	240 N⋅m (177 lb⋅ft) at 2200–5000	1,984 cc (121.1 in^{3})	Inline 5 with low-pressure turbo
2.4	B5244S2	2001–2008	140 PS (103 kW; 138 hp)	220 N⋅m (162 lb⋅ft) at 3300	2,435 cc (148.6 in^{3})	Inline 5
2.4	B5244S	2001–2003	170 PS (125 kW; 168 hp)	230 N⋅m (170 lb⋅ft) at 4500	2,435 cc (148.6 in^{3})	Inline 5
2.4	B5244S	2003–2008	170 PS (125 kW; 168 hp)	225 N⋅m (166 lb⋅ft) at 4500	2,435 cc (148.6 in^{3})	Inline 5
2.4T; 2.4T AWD	B5244T3	2000–2003	200 PS (147 kW; 197 hp)	285 N⋅m (210 lb⋅ft) at 1800–5000	2,435 cc (148.6 in^{3})	Inline 5 with low-pressure turbo
2.5T; 2.5T AWD	B5254T2	2003–2008	210 PS (154 kW; 207 hp)	320 N⋅m (236 lb⋅ft) at 1500–4500	2,521 cc (153.8 in^{3})	Inline 5 with low-pressure turbo
T5	B5234T3	2000–2004	250 PS (184 kW; 247 hp)	330 N⋅m (243 lb⋅ft) at 2400–5200	2,319 cc (141.5 in^{3})	Inline 5 with high-pressure turbo
T5	B5244T5	2005–2007	260 PS (191 kW; 256 hp)	350 N⋅m (258 lb⋅ft) at 2100–5000	2,401 cc (146.5 in^{3})	Inline 5 with high-pressure turbo
R AWD; (5-speed automatic)	B5254T4	2004–2006	300 PS (221 kW; 296 hp)	350 N⋅m (258 lb⋅ft) at 1800–6000	2,521 cc (153.8 in^{3})	Inline 5 with high-pressure turbo
R AWD; (6-speed automatic)	B5254T4	2006–2007	300 PS (221 kW; 296 hp)	400 N⋅m (295 lb⋅ft) at 1950–5250	2,521 cc (153.8 in^{3})	Inline 5 with high-pressure turbo
R AWD; (manual)	B5254T4	2004–2007	300 PS (221 kW; 296 hp)	400 N⋅m (295 lb⋅ft) at 1950–5250	2,521 cc (153.8 in^{3})	Inline 5 with high-pressure turbo

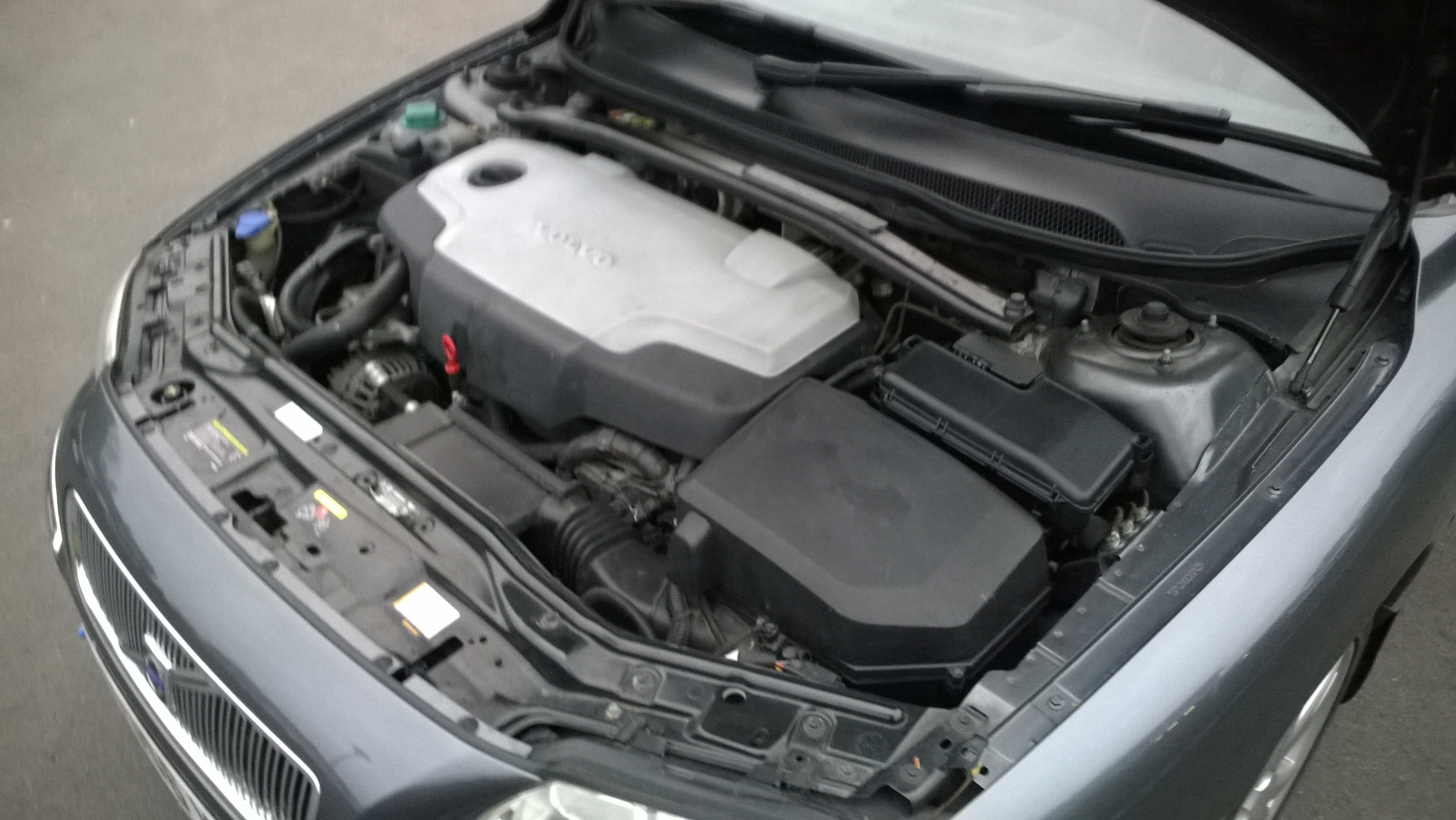
Engine compartment of second generation V70 2.4D

Diesel engines
Model	Engine code	Year(s)	Power at rpm	Torque at rpm	Displacement	Comment
2.5D (TDI)	D5252T	2000–2001	140 PS (103 kW; 138 hp) at 4000	290 N⋅m (214 lb⋅ft) at 1900	2,460 cc (150.1 in^{3})	Inline 5 with turbo; (VAG/Audi engine)
2.4D	D5244T2	2002–2006	130 PS (96 kW; 128 hp) at 4000	280 N⋅m (207 lb⋅ft) at 1750–3000	2,401 cc (146.5 in^{3})	Inline 5 with turbo
D5; D5 AWD	D5244T	2002–2006	163 PS (120 kW; 161 hp) at 4000	340 N⋅m (251 lb⋅ft) at 1750–3000	2,401 cc (146.5 in^{3})	Inline 5 with turbo
2.4D	D5244T7	2005–2008	126 PS (93 kW; 124 hp) at 4000	300 N⋅m (221 lb⋅ft) at 1750–2250	2,400 cc (146.5 in^{3})	Inline 5 with turbo
2.4D	D5244T5	2005–2008	163 PS (120 kW; 161 hp) at 4000	340 N⋅m (251 lb⋅ft) at 1750–2750	2,400 cc (146.5 in^{3})	Inline 5 with turbo
D5; D5 AWD	D5244T4	2005–2007	185 PS (136 kW; 182 hp) at 4000	400 N⋅m (295 lb⋅ft) at 2000–2750	2,400 cc (146.5 in^{3})	Inline 5 with turbo

Gas
Model	Engine code	Year(s)	Power at rpm	Torque at rpm	Displacement	Comment
Bi-Fuel; CNG	B5244SG	2001–2008	Petrol: 140 PS (103 kW; 138 hp) at 4500; Gas: 140 PS (103 kW; 138 hp) at 5800	Petrol: 220 N⋅m (162 lb⋅ft) at 3750; Gas: 192 N⋅m (142 lb⋅ft) at 4500	2,435 cc (148.6 in^{3})	Inline 5 for methane/petrol; (biogas/natural gas)
Bi-Fuel; LPG	B5244SG2	2002–2005	Petrol: 140 PS (103 kW; 138 hp) at 4500; Gas: 140 PS (103 kW; 138 hp) at 5100	Petrol: 220 N⋅m (162 lb⋅ft) at 3750; Gas: 214 N⋅m (158 lb⋅ft) at 4500	2,435 cc (148.6 in^{3})	Inline 5 for autogas/petrol; (LPG/autogas)

Second V70 generation engine radiators featured an optional "ozone-eating" catalytic coating, marketed as PremAir, which converted ground-level ozone into pure oxygen during normal vehicle operation. The maximum effect was achieved in urban traffic and strong sunlight.

=== Safety ===
Euro NCAP evaluated the S60 (saloon variant of V70) in 2001 awarding it 4 out of 5 stars for adult occupant protection. The S60 scored 10 of 16 points in the front test and 16 of 16 in the side test. The car received two of two points available in the pole test. The S60 received a total of 28 of 37 points and therefore four stars (25–32) in Euro NCAP's evaluation.

The Insurance Institute for Highway Safety (IIHS) evaluated the Volvo S60 (saloon variant). The S60 was granted the IIHS's highest rating of "good" in front and rear tests. The S60 was awarded the institute's second highest rating of "acceptable" in the side test. However, an improvement in the driver dummy's pelvis/leg rating from "marginal" to "acceptable" would yield an overall "good" rating in the side test.

== Third generation (2007–2016) ==
Third generation
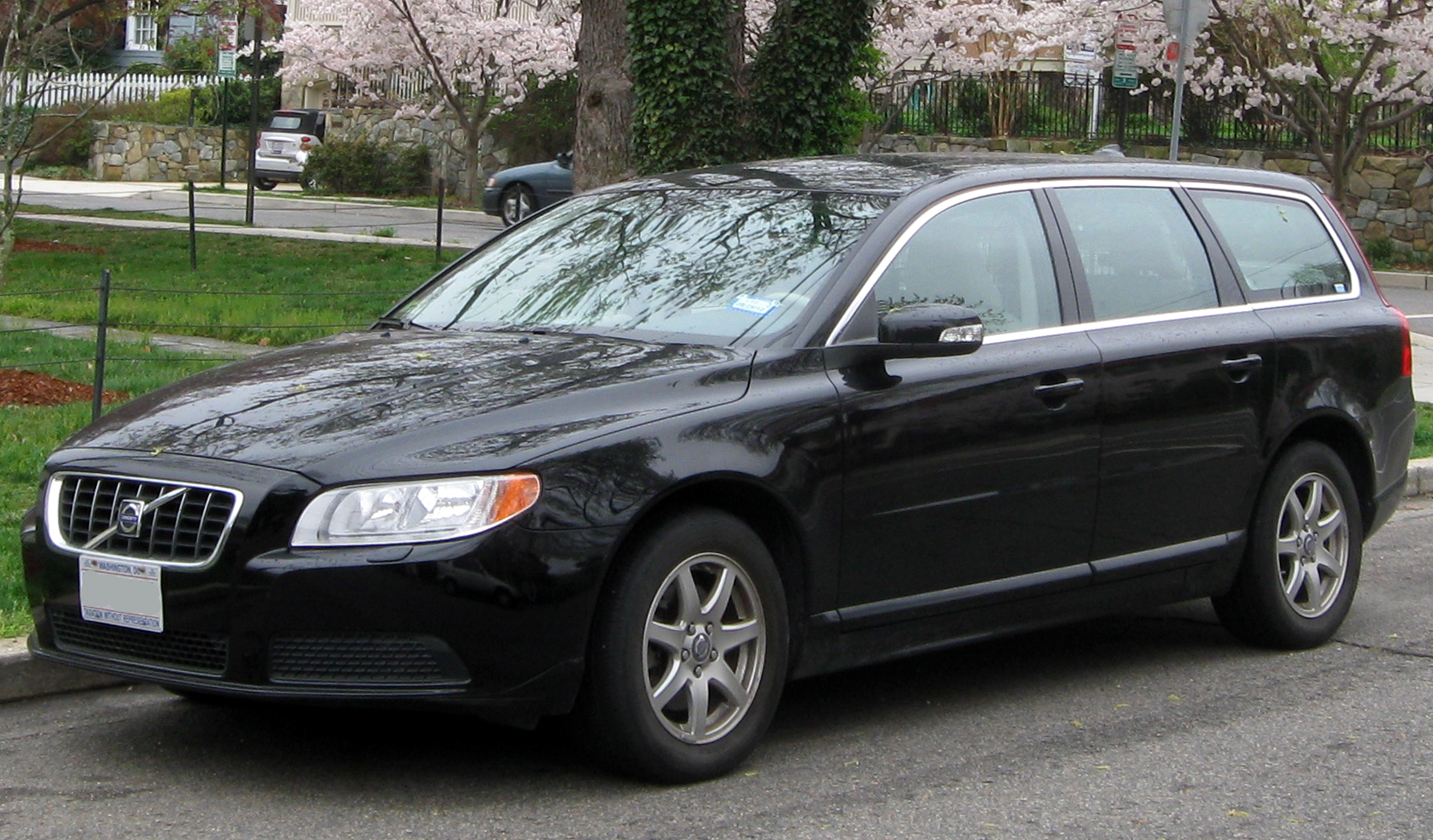
- 2008 Volvo V70 (US)

Overview
- Also called: Volvo XC70
- Production: December 2006–2016
- Model years: 2008–2016
- Assembly: Sweden: Torslanda (Torslandaverken)
- Designer: Stefan Jansson (exterior); Jonathan Disley (interior)

Body and chassis
- Platform: Volvo P3 platform
- Related: Volvo S80 II

Powertrain
- Engine: Petrol; 2.0 I4; 2.5 I5 T; 3.0 I6 T; 3.2 I6; Diesel; 1.6–2.0 I4; 2.0–2.4 I5
- Transmission: Manual; 5-speed Ford MTX75; 6-speed Getrag MMT6; 6-speed Volvo M66; Automatic; 6-speed Ford MPS6; 6-speed Aisin TF-80SC; 8-speed Aisin TG-81SC

Dimensions
- Wheelbase: 2,816 mm (110.9 in); XC: 2,815 mm (110.8 in)
- Length: 4,823 mm (189.9 in); XC: 4,838 mm (190.5 in)
- Width: 1,861 mm (73.3 in); 2,106 mm (82.9 in) with mirrors; XC: 1,870 mm (73.6 in); XC: 2,119 mm (83.4 in) with mirrors
- Height: 1,547 mm (60.9 in); XC: 1,604 mm (63.1 in)
- Curb weight: V70: 1,579–1,801 kg (3,481–3,971 lb); XC: 1,713–1,956 kg (3,777–4,312 lb)

Chronology
- Predecessor: Volvo 940/960/V90 estate
- Successor: Volvo V90

On 2 February 2007, Volvo debuted the third generation for the 2008 model year. Based on the Volvo P3 platform it shared numerous elements as well as general styling with the second generation Volvo S80. Compared with its predecessor, rear-seat legroom was increased by 2 centimetres (0.79 in) and a revised tailgate design increased the load area volume by 55 L. The V70 was offered for the first time with four- and six-cylinder engines. The high-performance V70R AWD models were discontinued with this third generation, only a mostly cosmetic R-Design package was made available.

After the 2011 model year, Volvo discontinued sales of the V70 in North America, instead marketing the FWD variant of the XC70.

The Sensus Infotainment System from the Volvo XC60 was made available in 2011 for the V70 and XC70. For 2012 the V70 and XC70 received a minor facelift. The front received a redesigned bumper with chrome accents, the Volvo logo on the front grille was enlarged. The indicators in the side mirrors were redesigned and changed to LED, and the rear light cluster redesigned. New optional alloy wheels and exterior paint options were added.

=== Third generation models ===
==== V70 ====
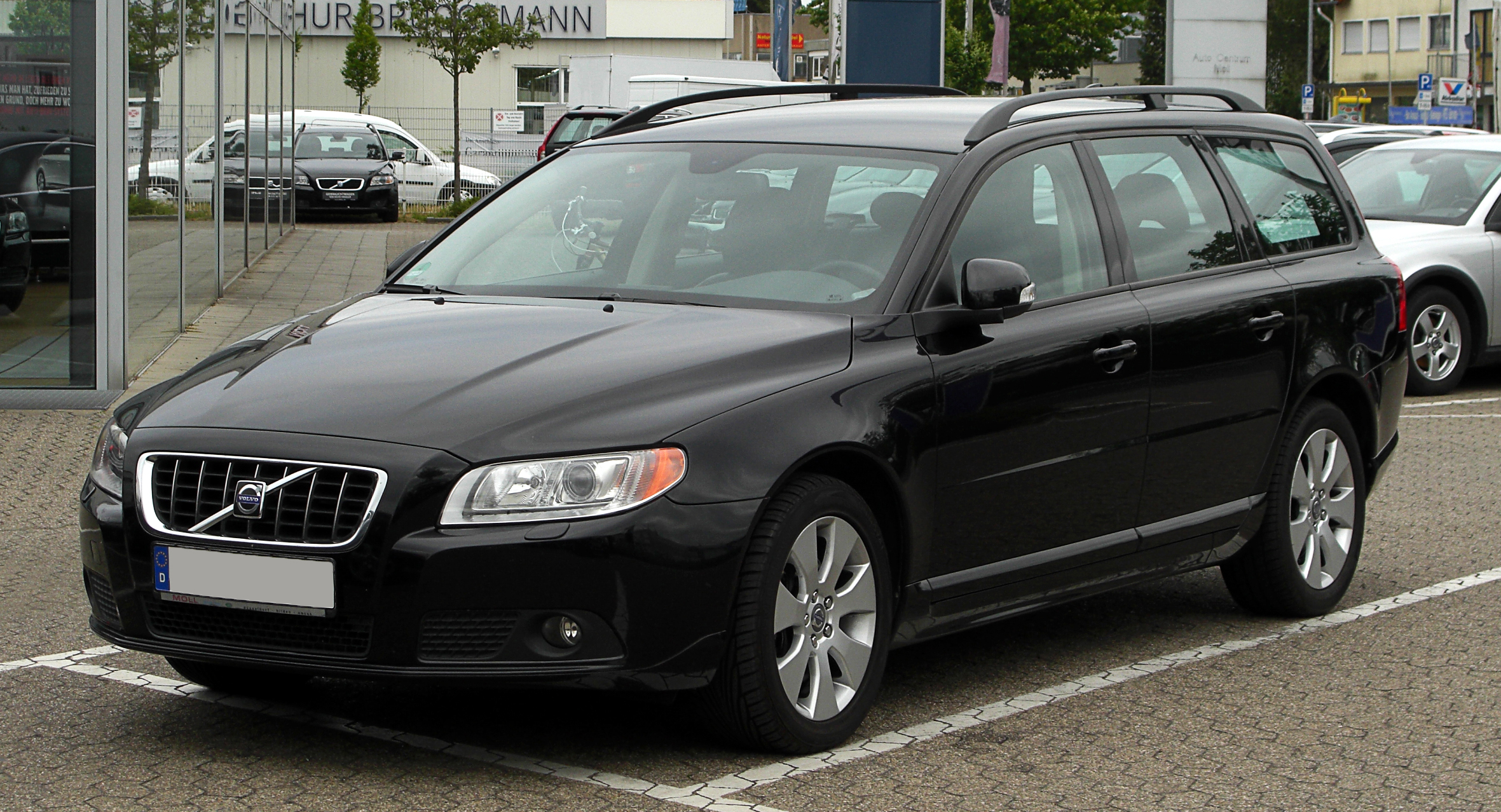
Volvo V70 pre-facelift (Germany)

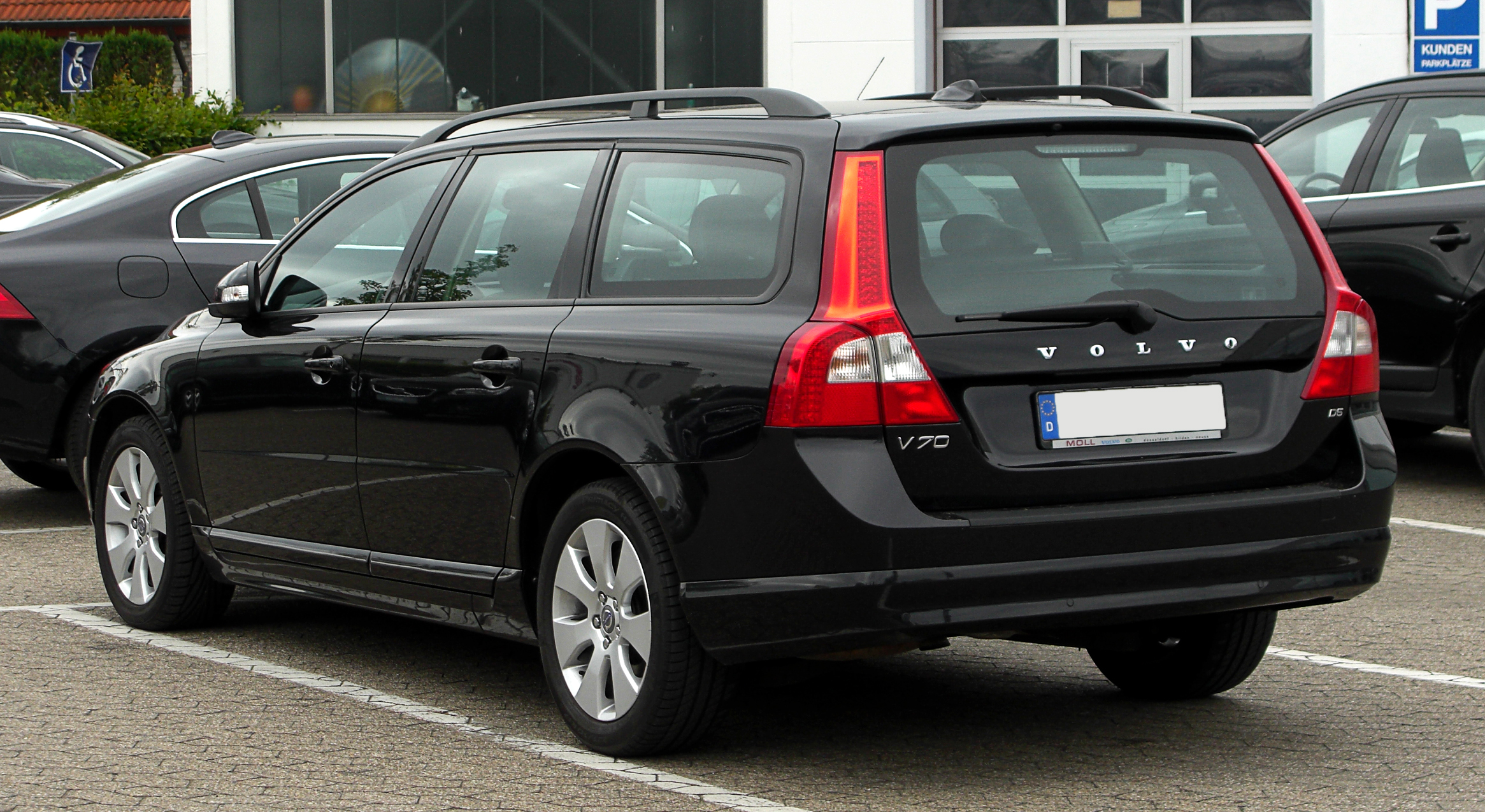
Volvo V70 pre-facelift (Germany)

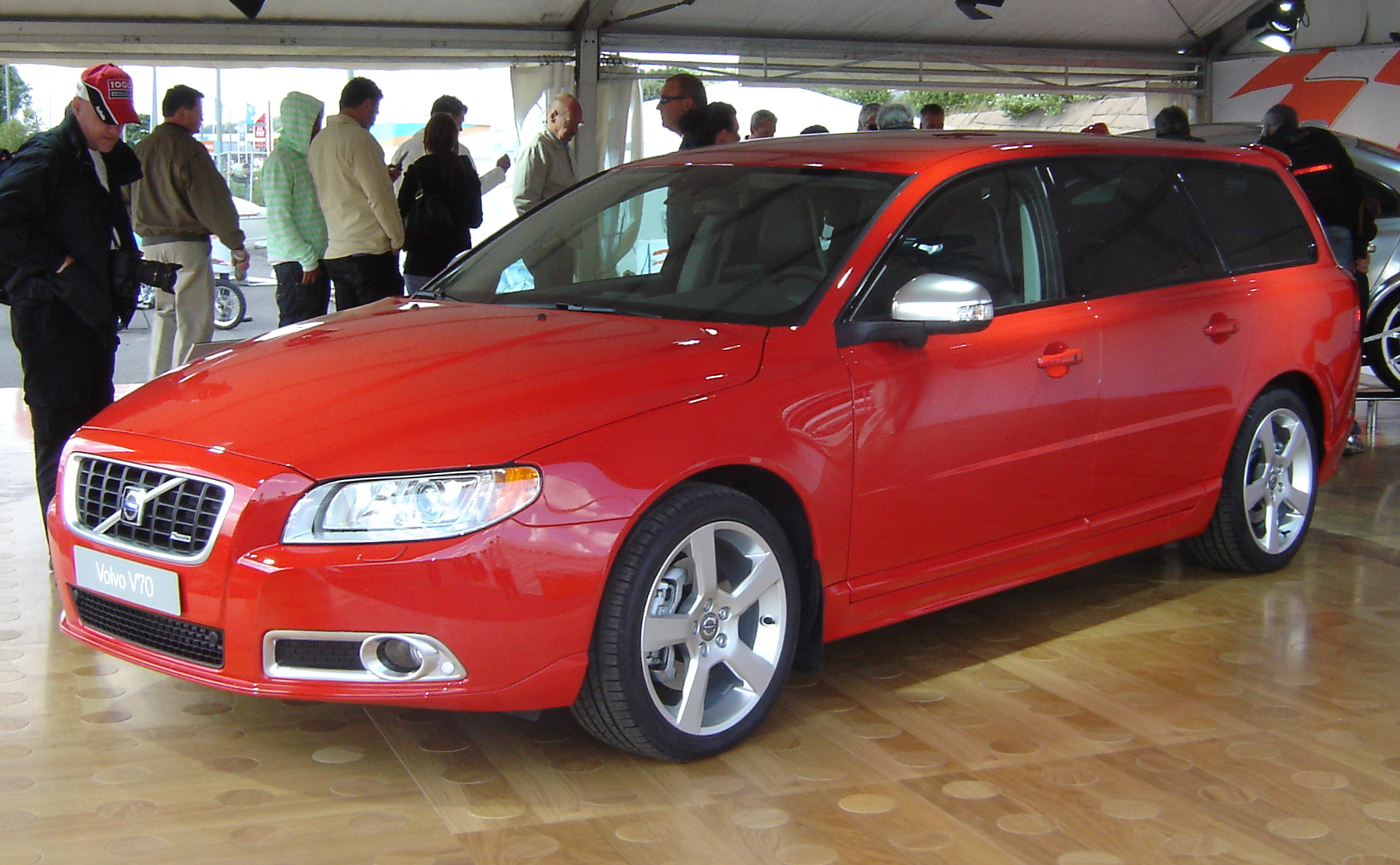
Volvo V70 R-Design

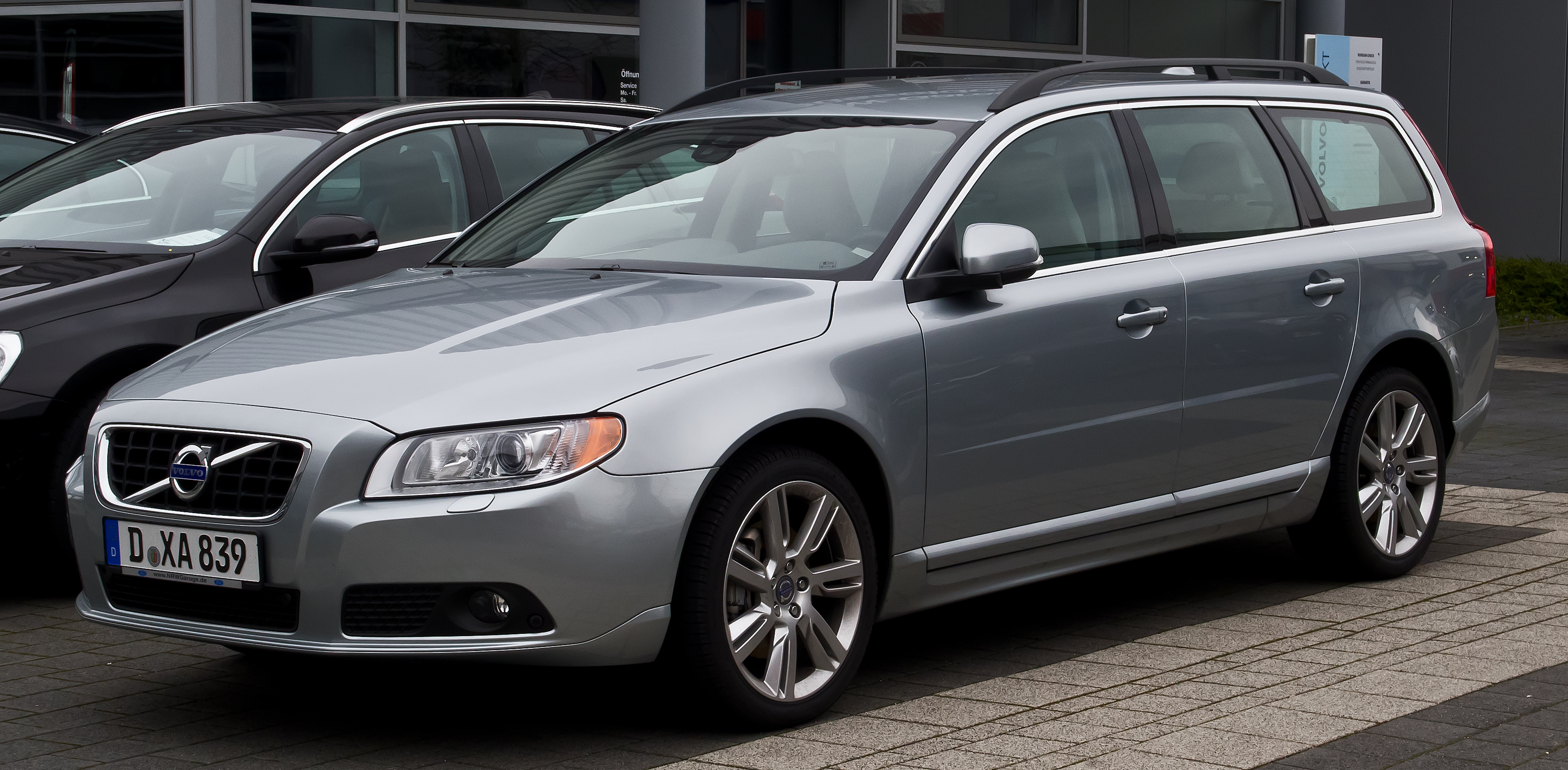
Volvo V70 post first facelift (Germany)

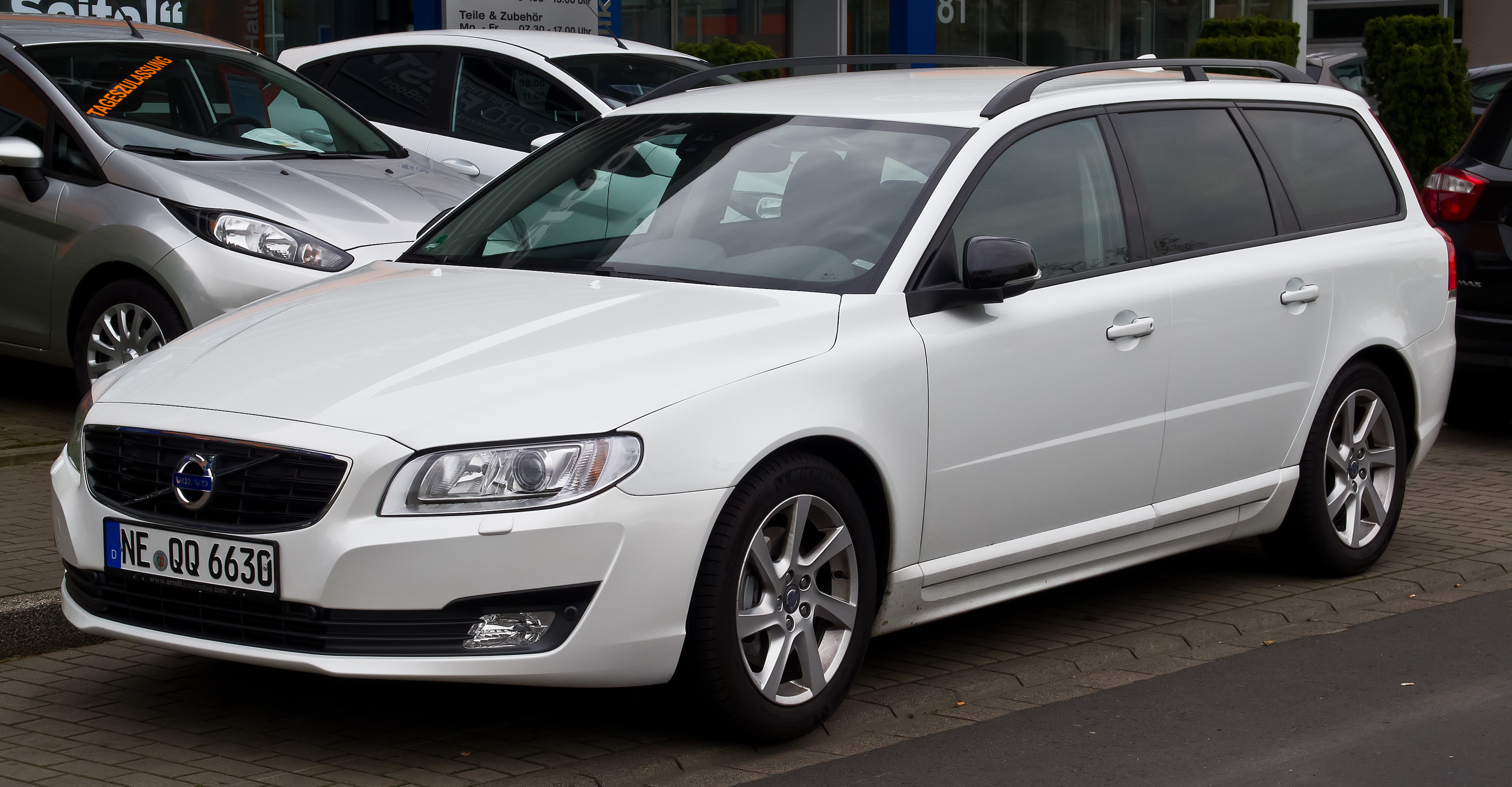
Volvo V70 post second facelift (Germany)

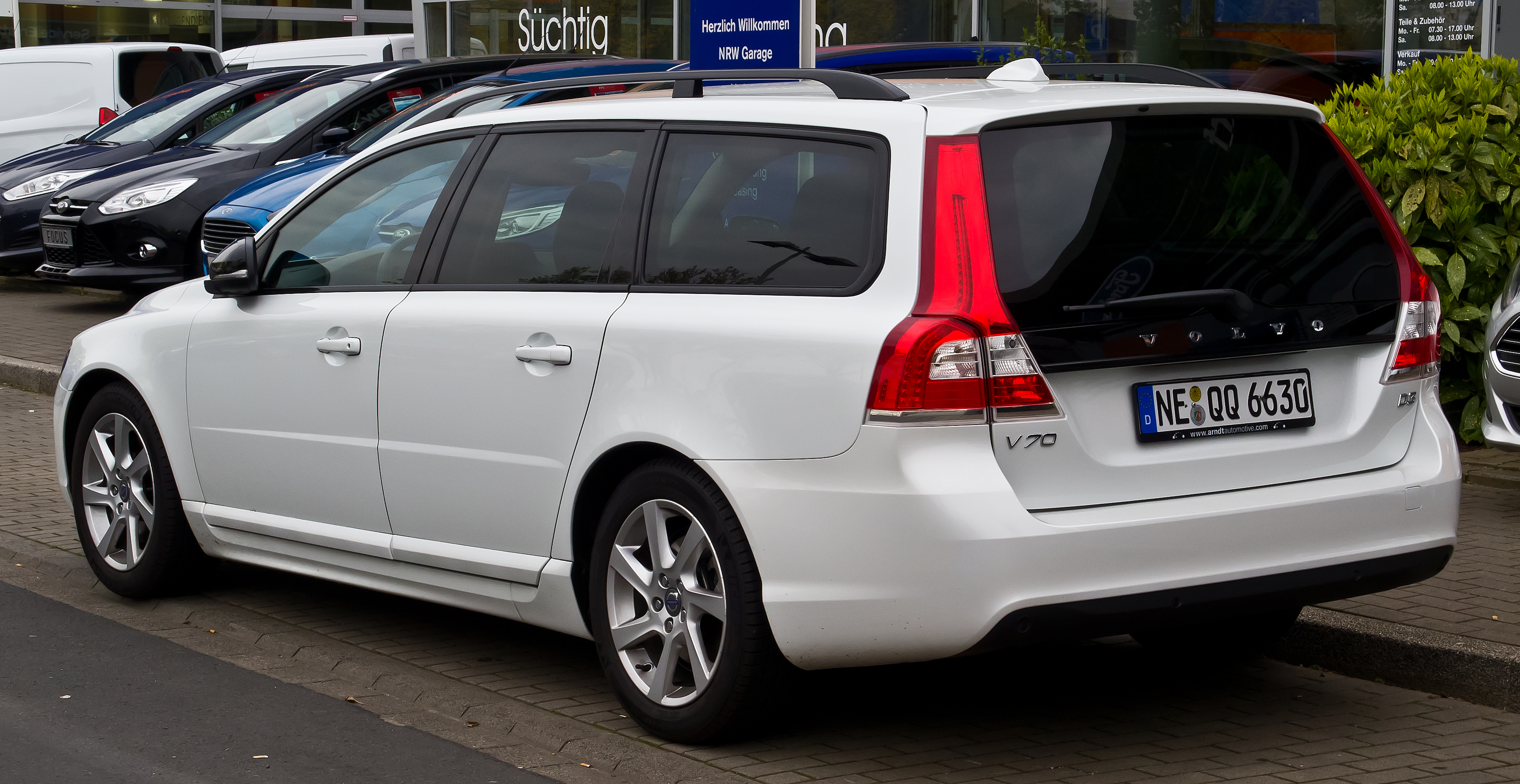
Volvo V70 post second facelift (Germany)

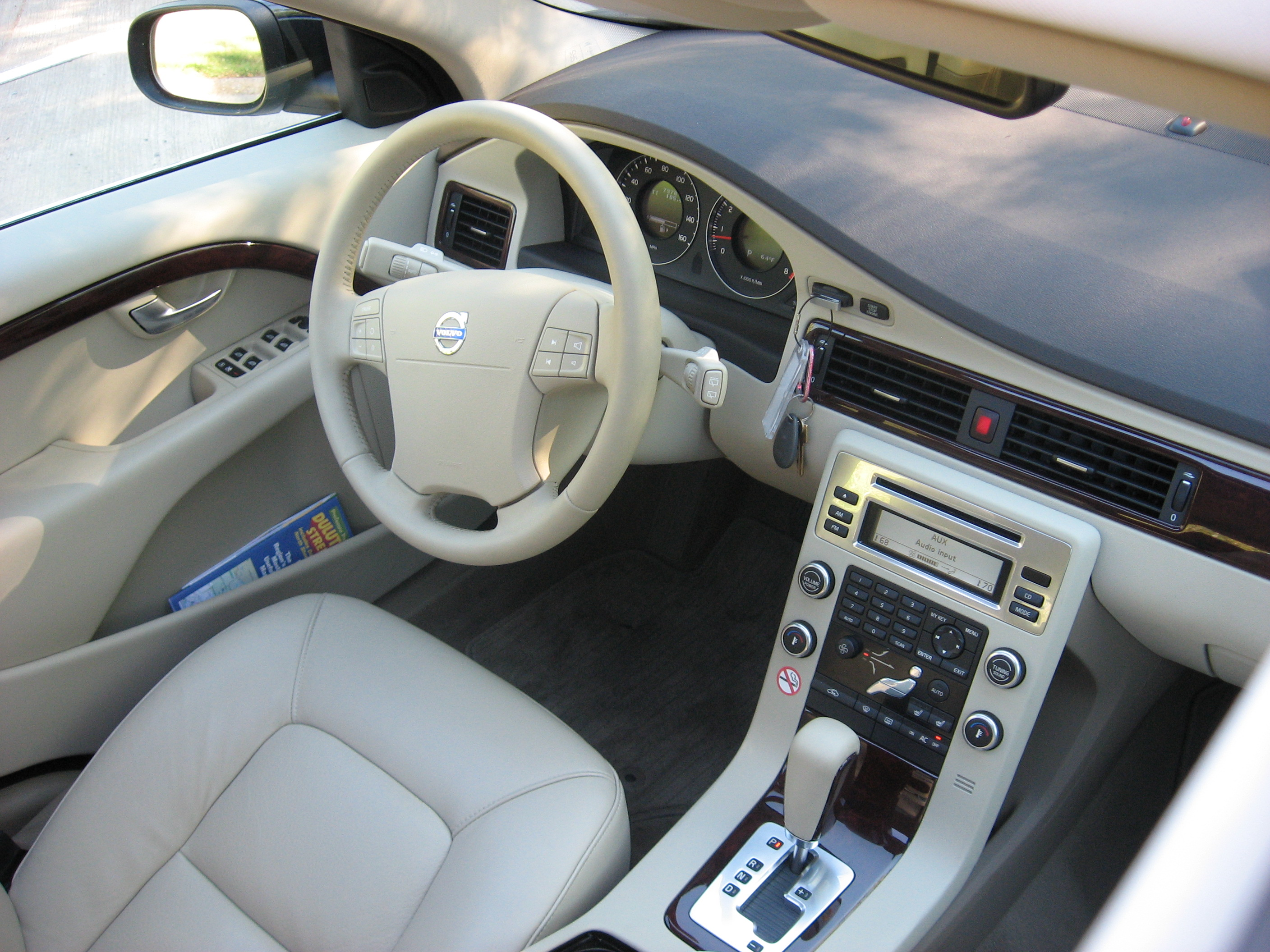
Interior pre-facelift (US)

==== V70 Plug-in Hybrid ====
As part of a joint venture with Vattenfall, a Swedish energy company, Volvo converted two Volvo V70 to diesel-electric plug-in hybrid demonstrators that have been in field testing in Gothenburg, Sweden, since December 2009. Vattenfall offered customers participating in this trial a supply of renewable electricity generated from wind or hydropower. This test allowed participants to experience the all-electric range at low temperatures, which has been a disadvantage of plug-in vehicles.

The V70 PHEV test car uses an 11.3 kWh lithium-ion battery pack. As reported by the test drivers, the V70 Plug-in Hybrid demonstrators have an all-electric range between 20 and 30 kilometres (12 and 19 mi). The demonstrators were built with a button to allow test drivers to manually choose between electricity or diesel engine power at any time. The first phase of the field trial ended in June 2010 and included 16 families, all employees of Volvo or Vattenfall, who had the car for 1.5 weeks to one month. A second phase of the test was to run from July to December 2010 with Vattenfall employees in Göteborg and Stockholm.

Among the key findings of the first phase are:

- Most drivers chose to use electricity in city traffic at lower speeds, but switched to diesel for highway driving.
- Test drivers found that 20 to 30 km was not enough all-electric range, and called for at least 50 kilometres (31 mi), some wanted 80 kilometres (50 mi) and others up to 150 to 200 kilometres (93 to 124 mi).
- All of the test drivers charge on a daily basis but none ever used the public charging station installed for the trial.
- Before the test trials, drivers were concerned about being a danger to pedestrians and cyclists due to the quietness of the electric-drive vehicle. After the test several of them changed their opinion and said that this issue was less of a problem than expected.

Volvo announced in 2009, and confirmed in 2010, the launch of series production diesel-electric plug-in hybrids as early as 2012. Volvo claimed that its plug-in hybrid could achieve 125 miles per US gallon (1.88 L/100 km; 150 mpg_{‑imp}), based on the European test cycle.

Ultimately production of the V70 Plug-in Hybrid did not commence, and the model was never commercially available. Instead, Volvo opted to introduce the V60 PIH in 2012.

==== XC70 ====
As with previous generation models the XC70 features increased ground clearance, optional all-wheel-drive and some cosmetic differences from the normal V70. On the outside there are XC-only front and rear bumpers, side skirts, wheel arch extensions and additional exterior door trims all in unpainted black plastic. The optional roof rails feature an embossed "XC" and are only available in black. Various unique alloy wheels are offered only for the XC.

For the third generation XC a new feature called hill-descent-control was introduced that limits vehicle speed when driving down a steep embankment.

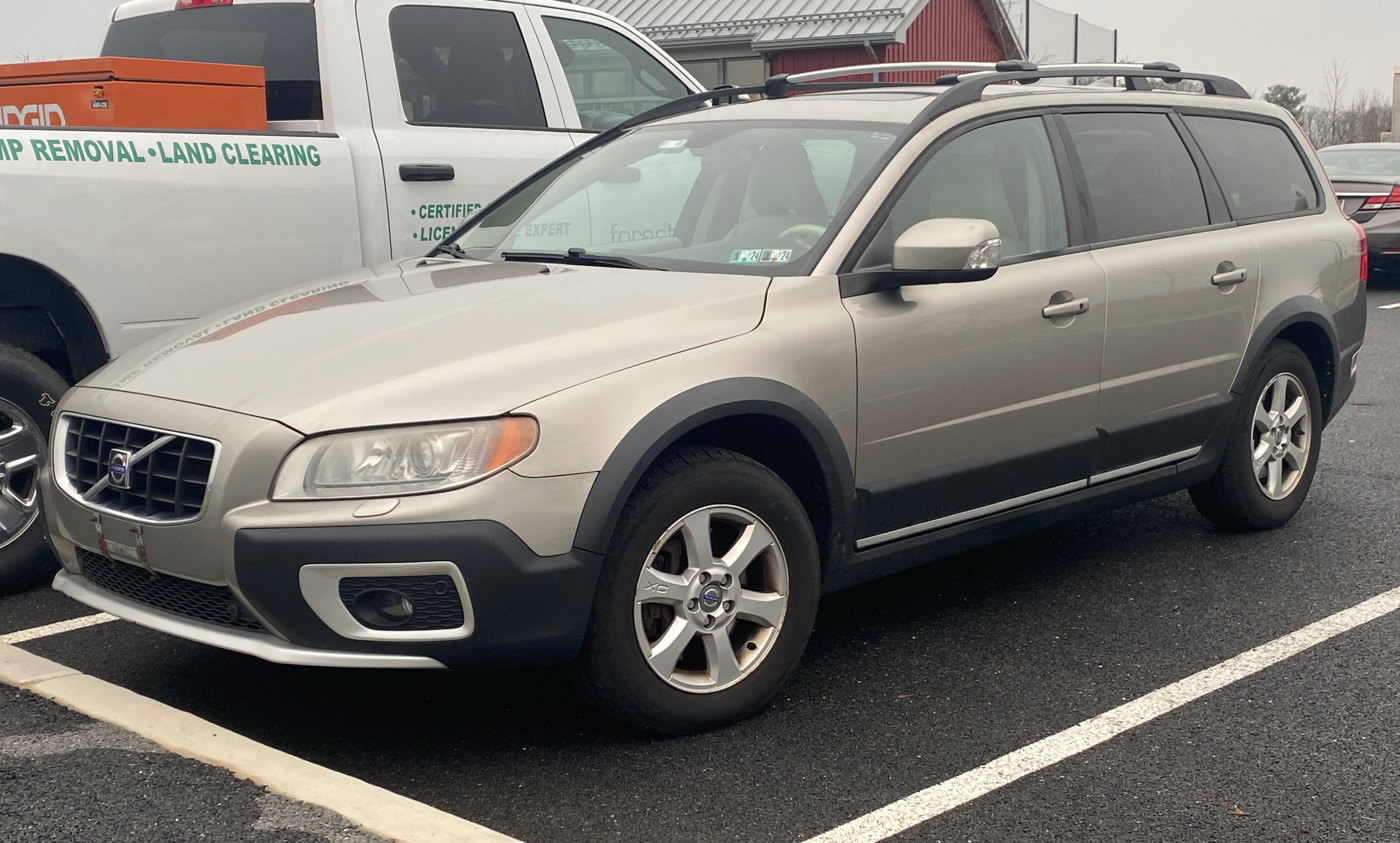
Volvo XC70 pre-facelift (US)

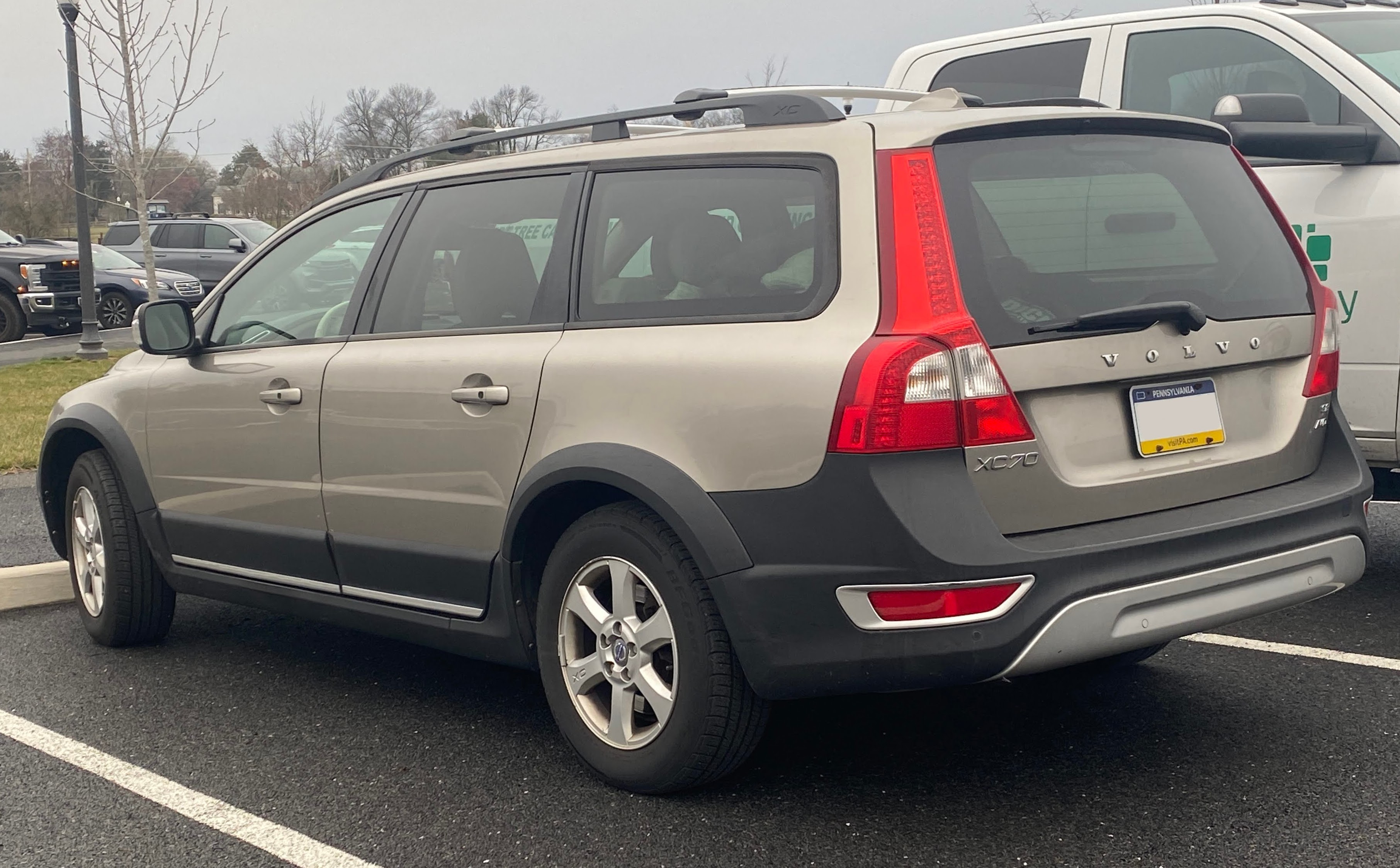
Volvo XC70 pre-facelift (US)

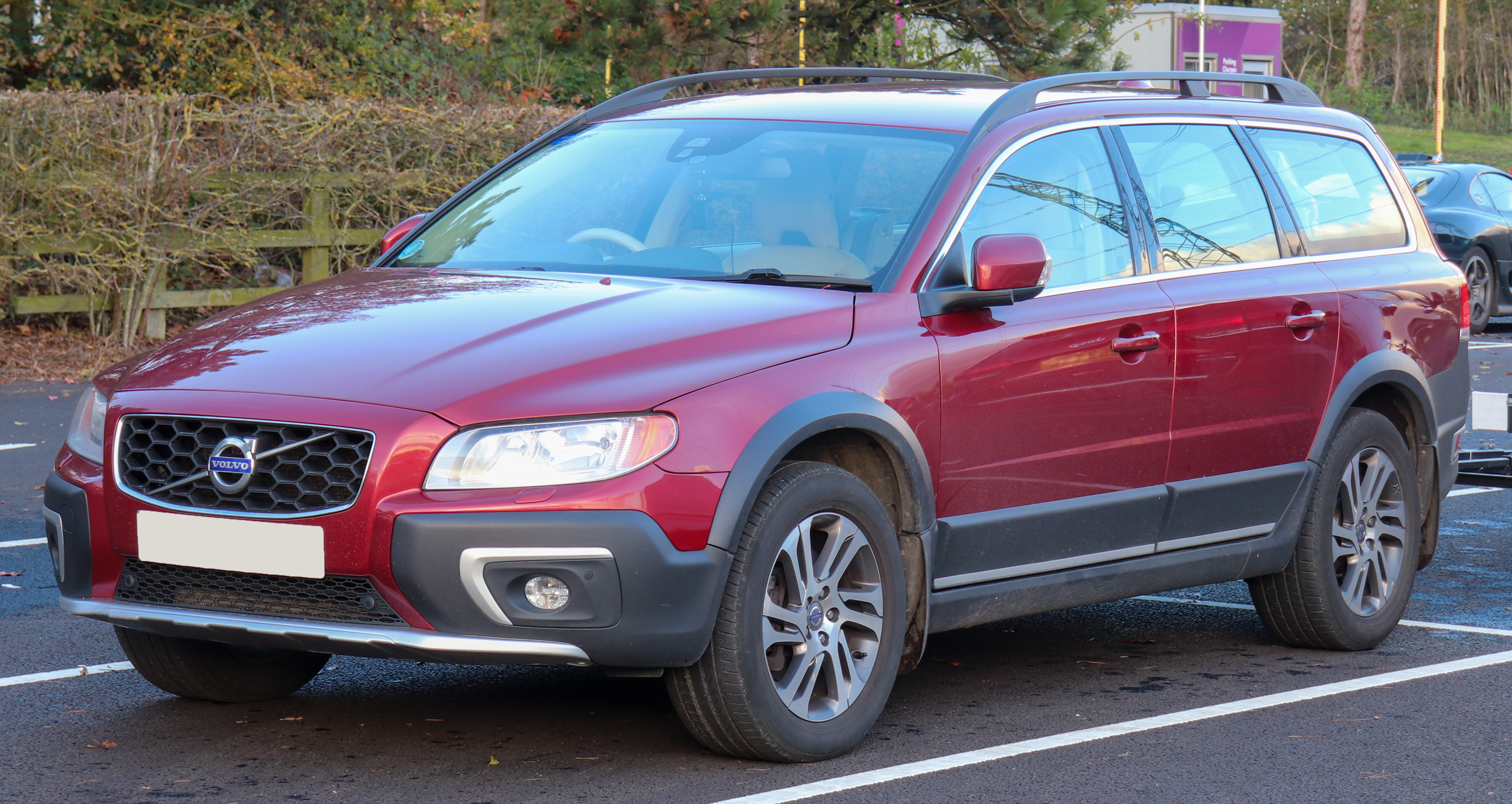
Volvo XC70 post facelift (UK)

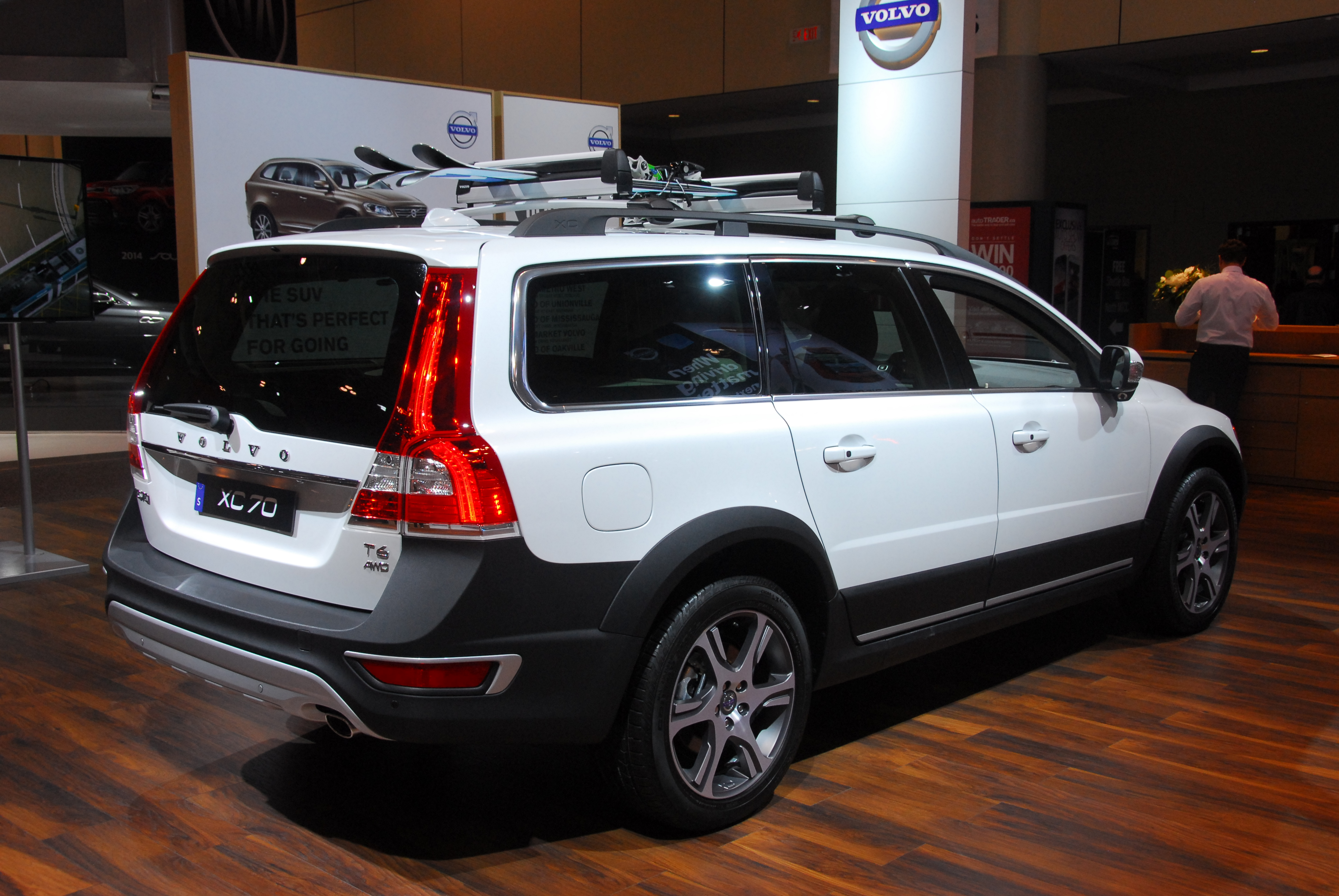
Volvo XC70 post facelift (Canada)

==== V70 / XC70 Ocean Race ====
In 2011 Ocean Race Edition versions of the V70 and XC70 were unveiled to coincide with the 2011–2012 Volvo Ocean Race. All cars featured special interior trim, decor and details. Exterior colours were limited to Ocean Race Blue Metallic or Electric Silver Metallic. Engine choices were limited to the D5 or T6.

For 2014 Ocean Race models were updated with detail changes such as different door sill plates, high gloss black mirror caps and front grille to accompany the 2014–2015 Volvo Ocean Race.

=== Engines ===
The V70 and XC70 were available with four-, five- and six-cylinder engines.

Petrol engines
Model	Engine code	Year(s)	Power	Torque at rpm	Displacement	Comment
2.0	B4204S3	2008–2010	145 PS (107 kW; 143 hp)	190 N⋅m (140 lb⋅ft) at 4500	1,999 cc (122.0 in^{3})	Inline 4
2.0F	B4204S4	2008–2010	145 PS (107 kW; 143 hp)	190 N⋅m (140 lb⋅ft) at 4500	1,999 cc (122.0 in^{3})	Inline 4 Flexifuel
2.0T	B4204T6	2010–2011	203 PS (149 kW; 200 hp)	300 N⋅m (221 lb⋅ft) at 1750	1,999 cc (122.0 in^{3})	Inline 4 with turbo
2.5T; 2.5T AWD	B5254T6	2008–2009	200 PS (147 kW; 197 hp)	300 N⋅m (221 lb⋅ft) at 1500	2,521 cc (153.8 in^{3})	Inline 5 with turbo
2.5FT; 2.5FT AWD	B5254T8	2009–2009	200 PS (147 kW; 197 hp)	300 N⋅m (221 lb⋅ft) at 1500	2,521 cc (153.8 in^{3})	Inline 5 with turbo; Flexifuel
2.5T; 2.5T AWD	B5254T10	2010–2011	231 PS (170 kW; 228 hp)	340 N⋅m (251 lb⋅ft) at 2800	2,521 cc (153.8 in^{3})	Inline 5 with turbo
2.5FT; 2.5FT AWD	B5254T11	2010–2011	231 PS (170 kW; 228 hp)	340 N⋅m (251 lb⋅ft) at 1700	2,521 cc (153.8 in^{3})	Inline 5 with turbo; Flexifuel
3.2; 3.2 AWD	B6324S	2008–2010	238 PS (175 kW; 235 hp)	320 N⋅m (236 lb⋅ft) at 3200	3,192 cc (194.8 in^{3})	Inline 6
3.2; 3.2 AWD	B6324S5	2011–2016	238 PS (175 kW; 235 hp)	320 N⋅m (236 lb⋅ft) at 3200	3,192 cc (194.8 in^{3})	Inline 6
T4	B4164T	2011–2016	180 PS (132 kW; 178 hp)	240 N⋅m (177 lb⋅ft) at 1600	1,596 cc (97.4 in^{3})	Inline 4 with turbo
T4F	B4164T2	2011–2016	180 PS (132 kW; 178 hp)	240 N⋅m (177 lb⋅ft) at 1600	1,596 cc (97.4 in^{3})	Inline 4 with turbo; Flexifuel
T4	B4204T19	2015–2016	190 PS (140 kW; 187 hp)	300 N⋅m (221 lb⋅ft) at 1350	1,969 cc (120.2 in^{3})	Inline 4 with turbo
T5	B4204T7	2011–201X	240 PS (177 kW; 237 hp)	320 N⋅m (236 lb⋅ft) at 1800	1,999 cc (122.0 in^{3})	Inline 4 with turbo
T5; BiFuel	B4204T11	2014–2016	245 PS (180 kW; 242 hp)	350 N⋅m (258 lb⋅ft) at 1500	1,969 cc (120.2 in^{3})	Inline 4 with turbo
T5	B5254T12	2014–2016	254 PS (187 kW; 251 hp)	360 N⋅m (266 lb⋅ft) at 5400	2,497 cc (152.4 in^{3})	Inline 5 with turbo
T6 AWD	B6304T2	2008–2010	285 PS (210 kW; 281 hp)	400 N⋅m (295 lb⋅ft) at 1500	2,953 cc (180.2 in^{3})	Inline 6 with turbo
T6 AWD	B6304T4	2011–2016	304 PS (224 kW; 300 hp)	440 N⋅m (325 lb⋅ft) at 2100	2,953 cc (180.2 in^{3})	Inline 6 with turbo

Diesel engines
Model	Engine code	Year(s)	Power	Torque at rpm	Displacement	Comment
1.6D (DRIVe)	D4164T	2008–2010	111 PS (80 kW; 109 hp)	240 Nm (177 lb*ft) at 1750	1,560 cc (95.2 in^{3})	Inline 4 with turbo
2.0D	D4204T	2008–2010	136 PS (100 kW; 134 hp)	320 N⋅m (236 lb⋅ft) at 2000	1,997 cc (121.9 in^{3})	Inline 4 with turbo
2.4D	D5244T5	2008–2009	163 PS (120 kW; 161 hp)	340 N⋅m (251 lb⋅ft) at 1750–2750	2,400 cc (146.5 in^{3})	Inline 5 with turbo
2.4D	D5244T14	2010–2011	175 PS (129 kW; 173 hp)	420 N⋅m (310 lb⋅ft) at 1500–2750	2,400 cc (146.5 in^{3})	Inline 5 with turbo
D2; (formally DRIVe)	D4162T	2007–2013	115 PS (85 kW; 113 hp)	270 N⋅m (199 lb⋅ft) at 1750	1,560 cc (95.2 in^{3})	Inline 4 with turbo
D2	D4204T20	2015–2016	120 PS (88 kW; 118 hp)	280 N⋅m (207 lb⋅ft) at 1500–2250	1,969 cc (120.2 in^{3})	Inline 4 with turbo
D3	D5204T2	2011–2012	163 PS (120 kW; 161 hp)	400 N⋅m (295 lb⋅ft) at 1400–2850	1,984 cc (121.1 in^{3})	Inline 5 with turbo
D3	D5204T7	2013–2016	136 PS (100 kW; 134 hp)	350 N⋅m (258 lb⋅ft) at 1500–2250	1,984 cc (121.1 in^{3})	Inline 5 with turbo
D3	D4204T9	2015–2016	150 PS (110 kW; 148 hp)	320 N⋅m (236 lb⋅ft) at 1750–3000	1,969 cc (120.2 in^{3})	Inline 4 with turbo
D4	D5244T17	2013–2016	163 PS (120 kW; 161 hp)	400 N⋅m (295 lb⋅ft) at 1500–2500	2,400 cc (146.5 in^{3})	Inline 5 with turbo
D4	D4204T5	2014–2016	181 PS (133 kW; 179 hp)	400 N⋅m (295 lb⋅ft) at 1750–2500	1,969 cc (120.2 in^{3})	Inline 4 with two turbos
D5; D5 AWD	D5244T4	2008–2009	185 PS (136 kW; 182 hp)	400 N⋅m (295 lb⋅ft) at 2000–2750	2,400 cc (146.5 in^{3})	Inline 5 with turbo
D5; D5 AWD	D5244T10	2010–2011	205 PS (151 kW; 202 hp)	420 N⋅m (310 lb⋅ft) at 1500–3250	2,400 cc (146.5 in^{3})	Inline 5 with two turbos
D5; D5 AWD	D5244T11	2012–2016	215 PS (158 kW; 212 hp)	420 N⋅m (310 lb⋅ft) at 1500–3250	2,400 cc (146.5 in^{3})	Inline 5 with two turbos
D5; D5 AWD	D5244T15	2012–2016	215 PS (158 kW; 212 hp)	440 N⋅m (325 lb⋅ft) at 1500–3050	2,400 cc (146.5 in^{3})	Inline 5 with two turbos

=== Comfort ===
Third generation V70 and XC70 models initially had Volvo's RTI navigation system available and have included Volvo's Sensus Infotainment System console from model year 2012 onward. As usual with Volvo, front seats and rear bench are of orthopedic design. Dolby Pro-Logic systems are standard, and speaker upgrades and sub-woofers are also available. The standard audio system includes a CD player; optional audio has a USB connector for MP3 players, Bluetooth streaming and the ability to import music files to the car's hard disk. From production week 46 in 2013, map upgrades can be performed by the owner via USB, rather than the previous DVD-based system.

DVD navigation with map data and remote control is standard on higher specifications. Options include a rear seat DVD entertainment system with two headrest monitors, Xenon headlights with headlamp washers, integrated child booster seats, an integrated home link remote control garage door opener, rear-door child-safety locks, front and rear park assist, power-adjustable front seats with 3-position memory and lumbar support, heated front and rear seats, an integrated grocery bag holder, an integrated sunglass holder, a frameless auto-dimming rear view mirror with rear view mirror compass, a power glass moonroof, 12 volt power outlet in the trunk, leather seats, rear tinted windows, rain sensor and an engine block heater. Anti-submarining seats and overhead-mounted seat belt reminder lights come standard. From the 2014 model year onward, a TFT dashboard replaced the analogue instruments.

Included as a standard feature beginning in 2007 was the inclusion of Volvo on call roadside assistance for four years, rear window deactivation, safe approach and home safe lighting.

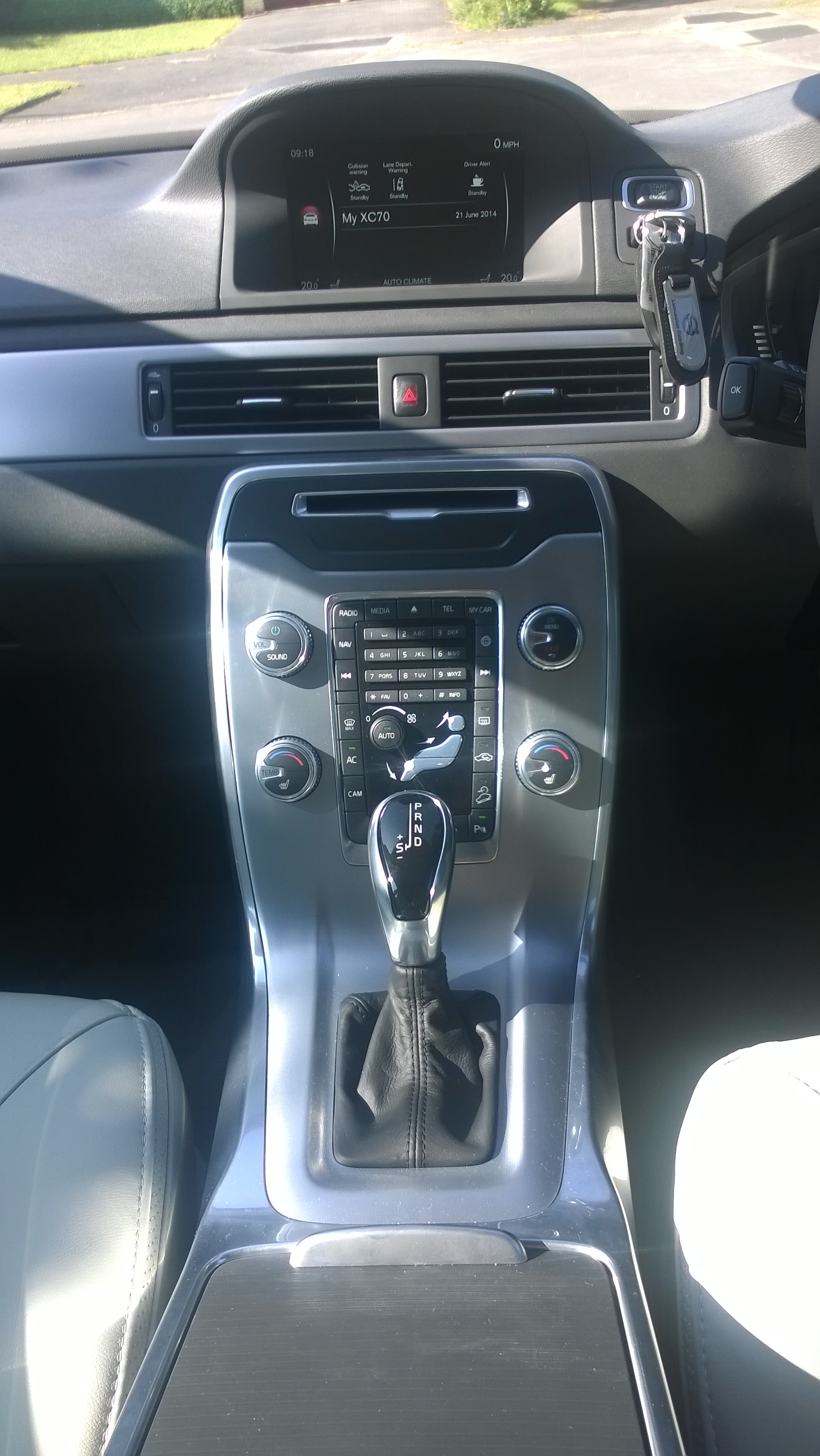
Volvo's Sensus console introduced in the 2012 model year

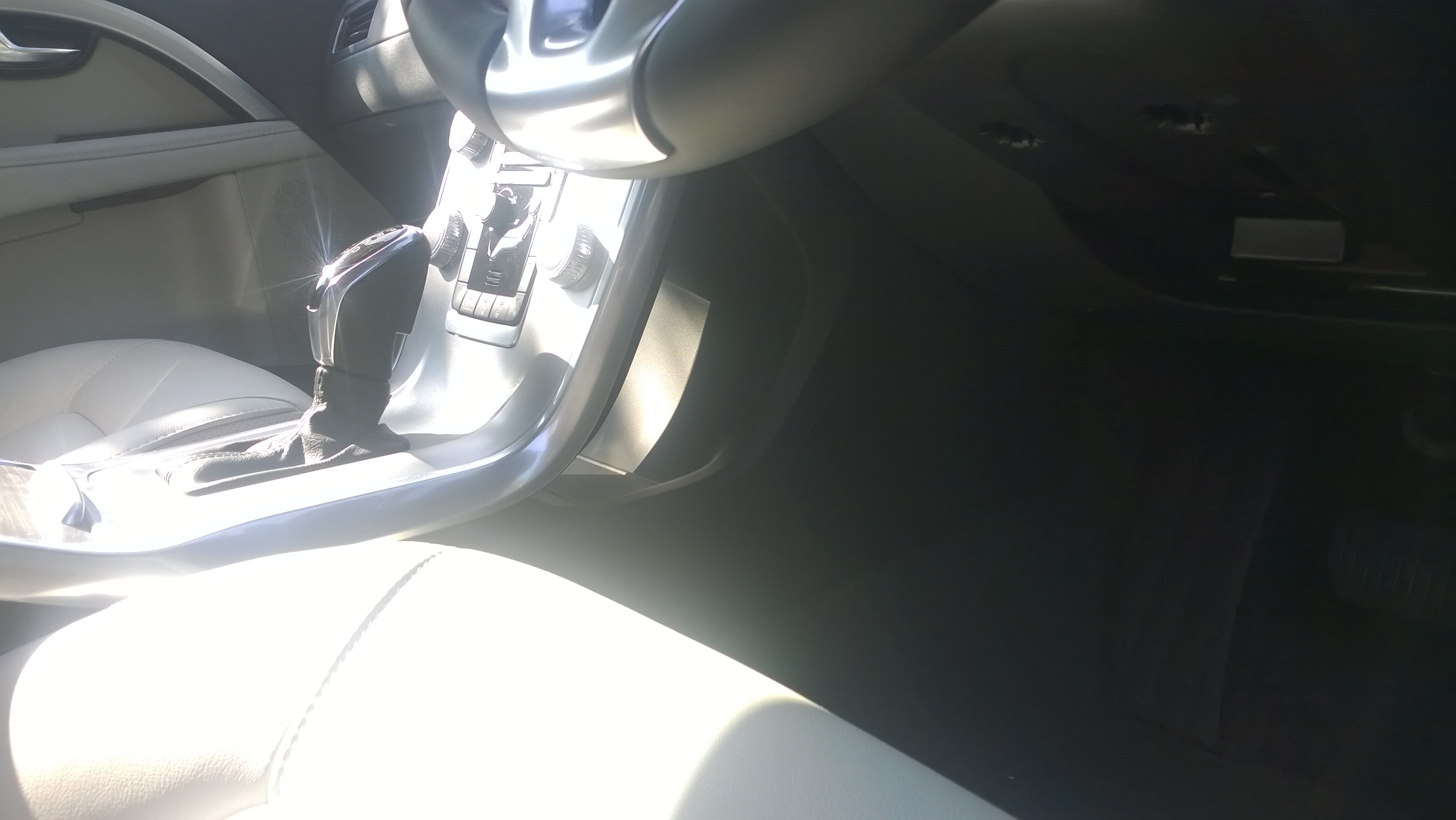
The console has a "floating" effect (all model years)

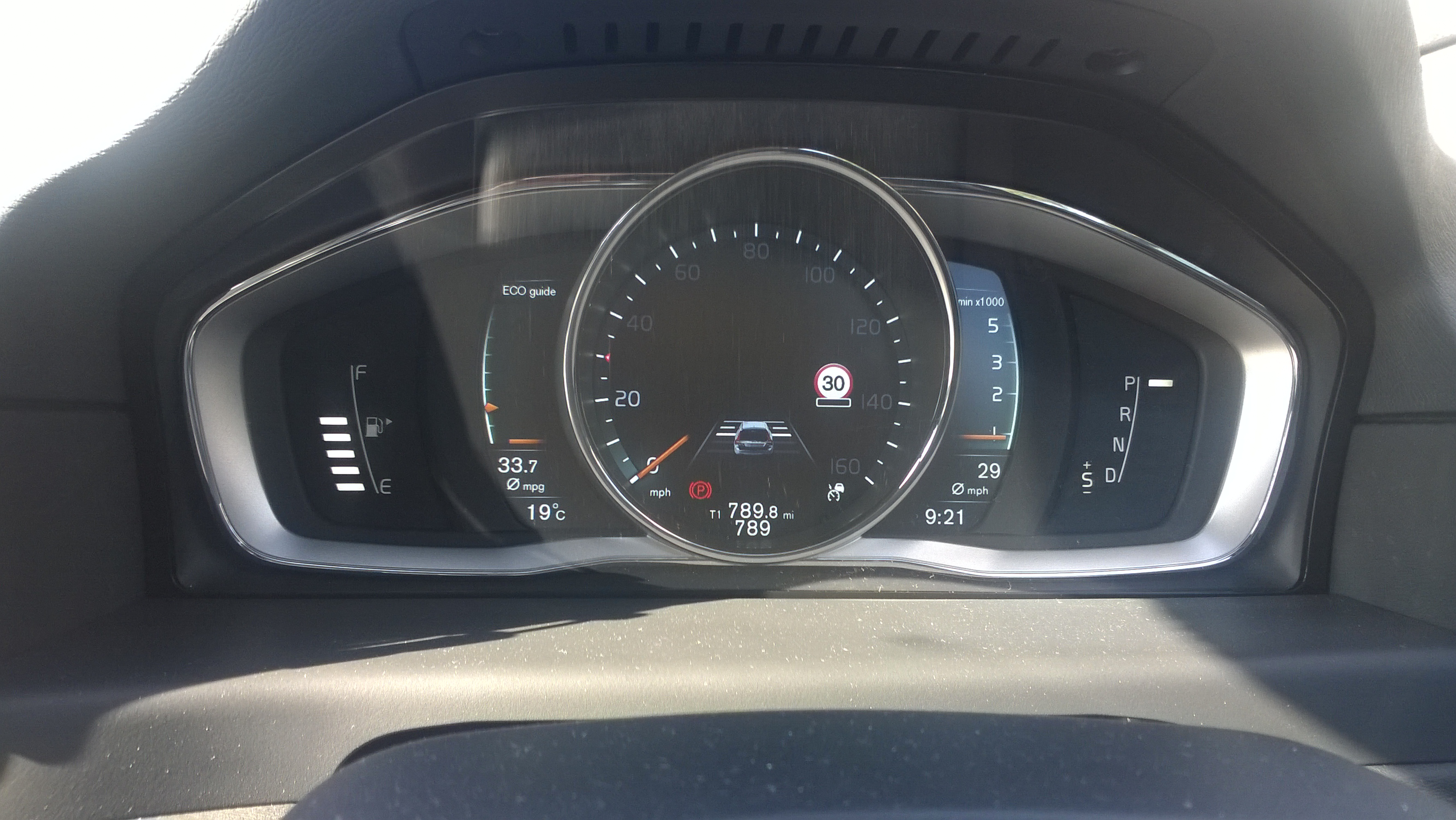
TFT instrument cluster introduced in the 2014 model year

=== Safety ===
As standard, the vehicle is equipped with driver, passenger, side and curtain airbags. Also featured is the WHIPS whiplash prevention system on the front seats.

Third generation V70s are available with the BLIS blind-spot sensor system, which can detect a vehicle otherwise hidden from a driver's view because of its position just off to one side of the car.

As is typical for Volvos, all models feature daytime running lights to improve driver visibility. Safety options include active-bending xenon headlights, auto dipping main beam, City Safety (which includes pedestrian and cyclist recognition software), Collision Avoidance, adaptive cruise control and traffic following, driver alertness monitoring and lane departure warning. Traffic sign recognition is also available.

The latest revision of the XC70 includes DSTC (Dynamic Stability and Traction Control), which is standard on all models and combines the functions otherwise known as Electronic Stability Programme and traction control.

Euro NCAP evaluated the V70 in 2007 awarding it 5 out of 5 stars for adult occupant protection. The V70 scored 15 of 16 points in the front test and 16 of 16 in the side test. The car was penalised one point of two points available in the pole test for improper deployment of the curtain airbag in both the original test and the re-test. The V70 was granted an additional two points for seat belt reminders of three available in this category. The V70 received a total of 34 of 37 points and therefore five stars (33–37) in EuroNCAP's evaluation.

ANCAP test results* Volvo V70 (2008)
Test	Score
Overall	5 /5 stars
Frontal offset	15.20/16
Side impact	16/16
Pole	1/2
Seat belt reminders	2/3
Whiplash protection	Not Assessed
Pedestrian protection	Marginal
Electronic stability control	Standard
