= Roll bar =

Roll bar or rollbar may refer to:

- Roll bar, also known as anti-roll bar or sway bar, a torsion spring bar that reduces vehicle roll
- Roll cage, a vehicle frame designed to protect occupants in the event of a crash
- Rollover protection structure, or rollover bar, similar in purpose to a roll cage, and fitted to open-topped cars or agricultural machinery
- Rollbar (G.I. Joe), a fictional character in the G.I. Joe universe
- Roll bars, bars that appear on a television screen when it is filmed, see Sync box (filmmaking)
