= Active rollover protection =

Electronic prevention of rollovers based on the electronic stability control technology

An active rollover protection (ARP), is a system that recognizes impending rollover and selectively applies brakes to resist.

ARP builds on electronic stability control and its three chassis control systems already on the vehicle – anti-lock braking system, traction control and yaw control. ARP adds another function: detection of an impending rollover. Excessive lateral force, generated by excessive speed in a turn, may result in a rollover. ARP automatically responds whenever it detects a potential rollover. ARP rapidly applies the brakes with a high burst of pressure to the appropriate wheels and sometimes decreases the engine torque to interrupt the rollover before it occurs.

Rollovers can also occur when the vehicle is knocked into a stationary object such as a curb. In these so-called "trip events", a vehicle hit from the side but kept from moving laterally by a curb would produce a moment about the center of gravity sufficient to produce a rollover. To counteract this, rollover stability systems have begun to incorporate an active suspension system in rollover protection. To accomplish this, the onboard computer uses data from the inertial measurement unit (IMU) to determine when a vehicle is in a rollover condition independent of yaw rate and vehicle speed. When the computer determines that the vehicle is at risk of rollover, it calculates the direction of roll and activates the active suspension system. The force produced in the suspension creates a moment (torque) opposite to that created by the lateral force, and keeps the vehicle safe.

== Other uses ==
The phrase is also used for active roll over bars for convertible cars, such as the Volkswagen Beetle, which can detect potential roll-over situations and automatically raises rollover bars hidden in the rear head restraints in a fraction of a second.

== See also ==
- Anti-roll bar
- Crosswind stabilization
- Gyroscope
- Roll cage
- Roll over protection structure
- Side Impact Protection System
- WHIPS (Whiplash Protection System)
