= Rollover protection structure =

Structure intended to protect equipment operators and motorists

A rollover protection structure or rollover protection system (ROPS) (/roʊps/ or /ˌɑːroʊpiˈɛs/) is a system or structure intended to protect equipment operators and motorists from injuries caused by vehicle overturns or rollovers. Like rollcages and rollbars in cars and trucks, cabs, frames or rollbars on agricultural and construction equipments, a ROPS involves mechanical components attached to the frame of the vehicle that maintain a clearance zone large enough to protect the operator's body in the event of rollover.

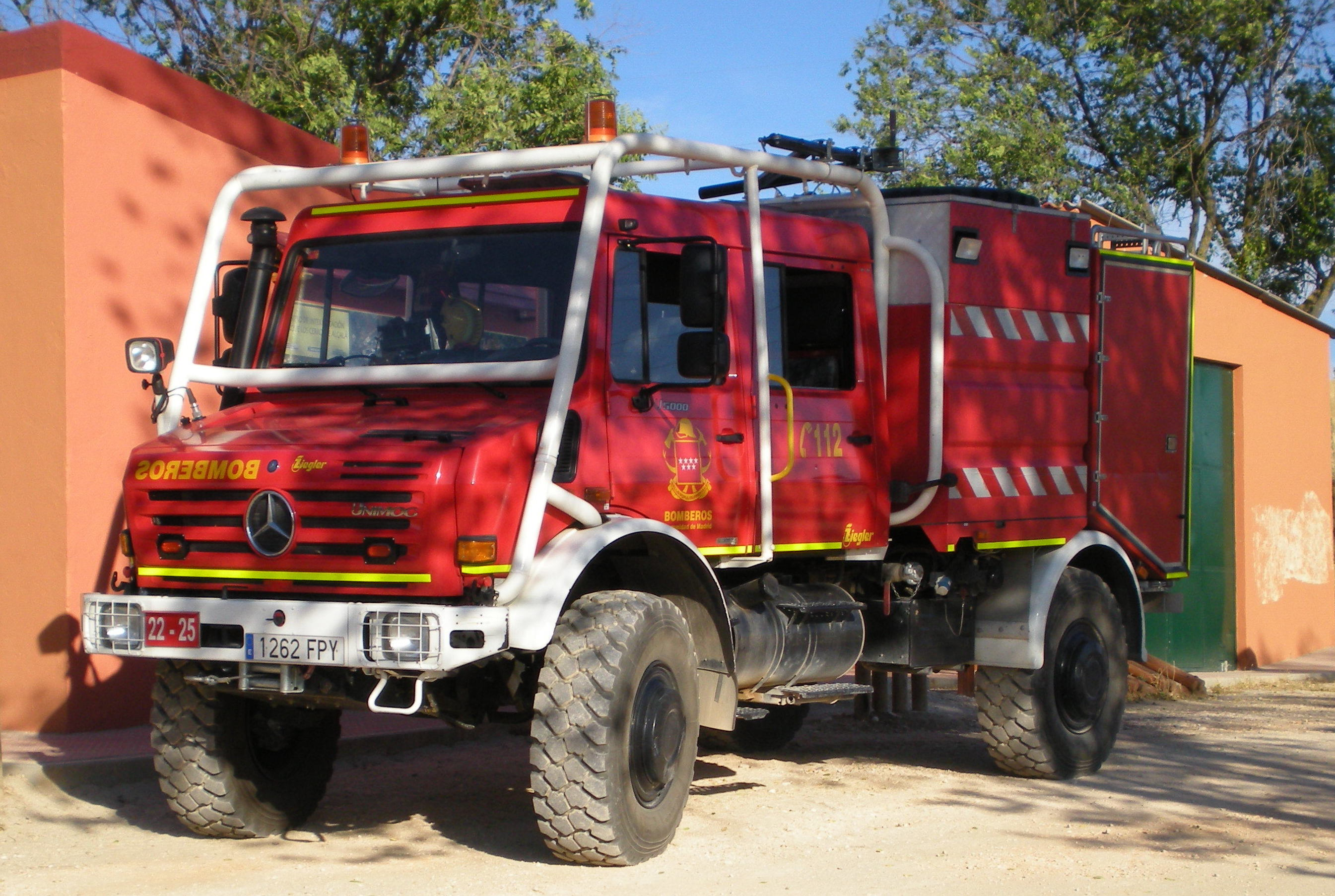
Unimog fire engine with roll over protection structures

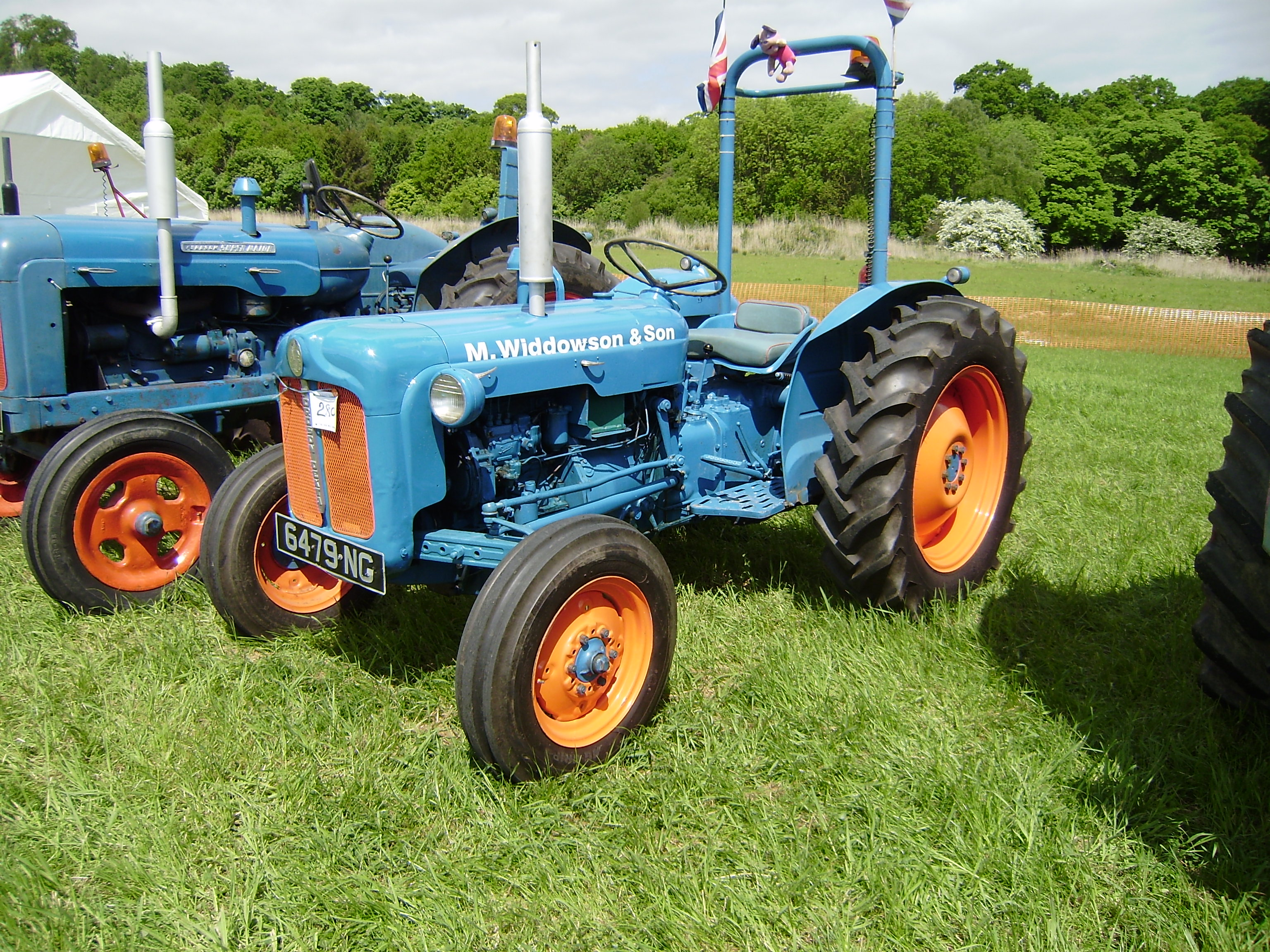
ROPS bar on a Fordson tractor.

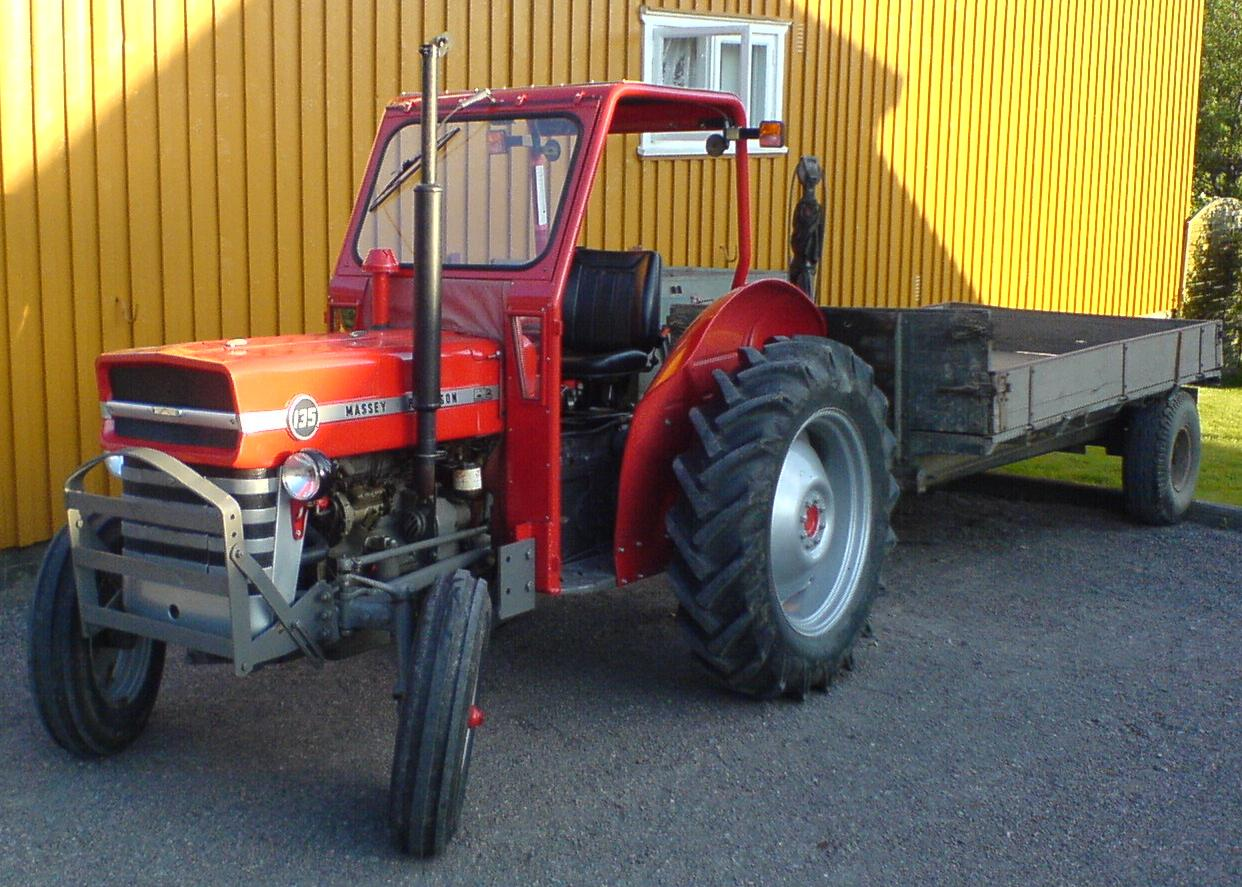
Rollover protection structure on an MF 135. Photo: K.A. Gallis.

Commonly found on heavy equipment (i.e. tractors), earth-moving machinery and UTVs used in construction, agriculture and mining, ROPS structures are defined by various regulatory agencies, including US Occupational Safety and Health Administration (OSHA) and international standard organizations such as ISO and OECD. The regulations include both a strength requirement as well as an energy absorption requirement of the structure. Some dump trucks add a protrusion to their boxes that cover the operator's compartment for ROPS purposes.

ROPS are commonly fitted to 4x4s, pickup trucks, earth moving equipment, soil compactors and utility vehicles used in the mining industry. Products such as this were developed out of necessity so employees travelling around or within mine sites were provided with extra protection in the event of a fleet vehicle rollover.

In the US, ROPS designs have to be certified by a professional engineer, who will normally require a destructive test. The structure will be tested at a reduced temperature (where the metal is more brittle), or fabricated from materials that have satisfactory low temperature performance. The International Organization for Standardization has guidelines for destructively testing ROPS structures on earthmoving machinery, excavators, forestry equipment and tractors. Theoretical performance analysis of major new design ROPS is not permitted as an alternative to physical testing.

== Variants ==
Some tractor operators have raised concerns about using ROPS in low-clearance environments, such as in orchards and buildings. In response, NIOSH developed an Automatically Deploying Rollover Protective Structure (AutoROPS) which stays in a lowered position until a rollover condition is determined, at which time it deploys to a fully extended and locked position. It is currently working with manufacturers to streamline the commercialization of this technology. The Division of Safety Research branch of NIOSH has developed cost-effective rollover protection structures (CROPS) for four tractor models (Ford 8N, Ford 3000, Ford 4000, Massey Ferguson 135), in an effort to provide safety for older model tractors.

Some automobile models have begun to adopt the phrase, substituting system for structure in the ROPS acronym, notably the Volvo C70 convertible models, and Jaguar XK. Their ROPS structures consist of two pyrotechnically charged roll hoops hidden behind the rear seats that will pop up in the case of a roll-over to protect the occupants. If the roof is up, the system will still work, shattering the rear window at the same time.

== History ==
=== Rollover injury and fatality ===
Tractor rollover has become one of the leading causes of occupational death in the agricultural industry. In the United States from 1992 to 2005, 1,412 workers were killed from tractor rollover, with roughly 10,000 suffering an injury. These rollover fatalities represented about 20% of all agricultural fatalities. During 2003 to 2010, 933 workers in agriculture, forestry, fishing and hunting industries were killed as a result of tractor rollover, accounting for over 63% of all tractor-related deaths. The National Safety Council estimates that between 150 and 200 tractor operators are killed due to rollover in the US each year. Researchers have also attempted to estimate the chances that a tractor rollover will result in a fatality of the operator. An adjusted probability of about 8 deaths per 100 tractor overturns (8%) was extrapolated using data from the Kentucky Fatality Assessment and Control Evaluation (FACE) Program. Furthermore, youth are particularly at risk of being crushed or pinned by a machine (all-terrain vehicle, tractor, etc.) that is not equipped with a rollover bar. All-terrain vehicles and tractors continue to be leading causes of fatal injury among youth in agricultural settings.

The installation of Rollover Protective Structures (ROPS) on older tractors that lack these protective devices has been identified as a viable solution for reducing overturn fatality rates among US farmers. When worn with a seat belt, these engineering controls are 99% effective in preventing operator death if an overturn occurs. The US National Institute for Occupational Safety and Health estimates that fatality rates from tractor overturns in the US could be reduced by a minimum of 71% if all tractors were equipped with ROPS. When paired with proper seat belt use on tractors, NIOSH estimates that ROPS could eliminate nearly all fatalities caused by tractor and lawn mower overturns. Without a seat belt, the ROPS is still 70% effective in preventing operator death, though there is a possibility that the rider may be thrown from the tractor during the overturn, and thus left unprotected by the ROPS.

=== Usage rates ===
Research from Sweden shows that the fatality rate from tractor rollover remains stable when ROPS prevalence rates range from 40% to 75%; only until the rate of ROPS adoption reaches 75% to 80% does the fatality rate from rollover fall significantly, to near-zero. The latest estimates of tractors equipped with ROPS in the United States show that 59% of tractors were ROPS-equipped in 2006, an increase from the 38% in 1993. With steady increases in the installation of ROPS, it is projected that the rollover fatality rate will decline steadily, until reaching a rate near zero by 2028.

ROPS usage has also appeared to be linked to a number of factors. There is regional variation in ROPS usage within the United States, as estimates from 2006 showed that tractor operators in the South had the highest prevalence of ROPS usage at 65%, while the Northeast had the lowest prevalence of ROPS usage at 51%. The West and Midwest reported rates of 60% and 56% respectively.

Age of tractor operator is a large risk factor, as increasing age is associated with decreasing rates of ROPS usage. The oldest group of tractor operators, those ages 65 and above, have the lowest rate of overall ROPS usage at 42%. Additionally, older tractor operators are more likely to suffer fatality and severe injury outcomes following tractor rollover than younger operators. Along with the age of the tractor operator, the age of the tractor itself is a risk factor. Older tractor models are less likely to be equipped with ROPS, possibly owing to impracticality in installation or to mandated installations in newer models. Further, older tractors are more dangerous than newer tractors, possessing narrow front ends and a higher center of gravity, as well as being more prone to operational failure.

Economics also appears to be a major factor in rates of ROPS adoption. Farms with low value of sales, part-time operations, and smaller acreage are less likely to employ ROPS-equipped tractors than farms with high value of sales, full-time operations, and larger acreage. Additionally, farms that use more hired labor over non-hired labor (family) are found to have fewer fatal tractor overturns. Overall, farms that are more economically viable are more likely to install ROPS on tractors than smaller, lower-income farms.

=== ROPS adoption ===
Tractor rollover deaths have been identified as a public health problem since the 1920s. Research efforts from several countries towards the development of engineering controls to reduce injury from rollover persisted for several decades before any legislation took place. In 1959, Sweden became the first country to enact ROPS legislation, requiring all newly manufactured tractors in the country to have ROPS installed. This requirement was expanded in 1965, requiring all tractors in Sweden, regardless of manufacture date, to have ROPS installed if it was operated by an employee and not the actual owner. Similar legislation requiring ROPS installation has been enacted in Australia, Germany, and Denmark.

In the United States, standards for ROPS design and utilization for tractors were first developed in 1967 by the American Society for Agricultural and Biological Engineers. ROPS legislation was passed in 1975, with OSHA requiring that all tractors manufactured from 25 October 1976 onwards be equipped with ROPS. In 1985, the development of a new voluntary safety standard by the American Society of Agricultural and Biological Engineers (S318.10) encouraged an initiative by American tractor manufacturers to equip new tractors over 20 horsepower with ROPS.

Agricultural health and safety researchers have observed that increases in ROPS protected tractors in the United States can largely be tied to attrition (older tractors without ROPS being replaced with newer tractors with ROPS) vs. installation of ROPS. Additional studies have indicated the need to promote and facilitate ROPS installation on older tractors, as many farmers are unwilling to replace their older tractors. Overall, these studies demonstrate that relying on the eventual replacement of tractors without ROPS – and the installation of ROPS on all older tractors – is not an expeditious solution to tractor overturn deaths and will result in the deaths of many US tractor operators over the next few decades.

==== Barriers to ROPS installation in the United States ====
Over the past few decades, quantitative and qualitative research studies have attempted to identify farmers' potential barriers to ROPS adoption. Cost, time to find and install ROPS parts, and dismissal of personal risk have all been prominently identified barriers to ROPS adoption. Research also shows that knowledge of tractor overturn risks and the benefits of ROPS installation do not appear to stimulate farmer interest in installing ROPS. Equipment dealers have also cited a number of barriers, such as a perceived lack of farmer interest, injury liability, difficulty recovering expenses and a lack of understanding amongst dealers regarding the magnitude of the overturn fatality problem, which negatively impacts dealers' interest in ROPS installation.

==== Programs to increase ROPS installation in the United States ====
Several strategies have been employed to address these barriers and motivate farmers to install ROPS. In 1985, equipment manufacturers launched a promotional campaign to encourage ROPS installation activities, although industry representatives state the campaign did not stimulate considerable interest in ROPS installation in the farm community ^{[1]}. Education has also been largely employed by extension agents and agricultural health and safety educators as a means for increasing ROPS installations, although evaluations of educational interventions indicate they do not markedly decrease agricultural worker injury rates or increase ROPS installation activity. However, in Kentucky, a community awareness campaign did appear to increase interest in ROPS installation. Various state farm bureaus (VA, NC, and IL) have also offered financial incentives for members to install ROPS, while an online ROPS Inventory Site called the KY ROPS Guide, was developed to assist farmers searching for ROPS.

In 2006, the New York ROPS Rebate Program was launched in an effort to increase access to ROPS among New York tractor operators; this addressed the Northeastern United States' consistently lower rates of ROPS usage than other regions of the United States. The program has since expanded to seven states including New York, Pennsylvania, Vermont, New Hampshire, Wisconsin, Massachusetts, and Minnesota.

These programs incorporate a number of components that build on prior ROPS research. These include targeted promotions, rebates for 70% of the cost to install ROPS (with varying caps on farmers out of pocket expense) and toll-free ROPS hotline assistance with the ROPS purchase and ordering process. Rebate funding is provided via state funding resources or private industry / fundraising campaigns. Programs have increased farmer interest in ROPS installation with an average of 1,200 calls annually to the ROPS hotline and farmers are generally satisfied with these services (99% of program participants would recommend the program to other farmers). Programs have also documented the prevention of injury and death for farmers who have participated in these installation programs.

== Current efforts to increase ROPS adoption in the United States ==
=== National Tractor Safety Coalition (NTSC) ===
In an effort to build on the momentum of prior ROPS interventional efforts to create a national ROPS installation solution, a number of research, government and industry groups organized a two-day 'Whole-System-in-the-Room' workshop in Chicago, Illinois in May 2014. The purpose of the meeting was to outline a national strategy for ROPS installation that all stakeholders could agree on and to engage multiple industry groups in strategy implementation efforts. Close to 50 organizations were represented at the meeting and included representatives from the following industry groups: manufacturers and dealers, agricultural organizations, health and safety organizations, financial and insurance groups, government organizations, researchers, private corporations, media, farmers/farm safety advocates. By the end of the meeting, the National Tractor Safety Coalition was officially organized with the mission "to prevent tractor-related injuries and deaths in US agriculture by developing and implementing collaborative, stakeholder-driven, evidence-based solutions." A detailed list of common goals are featured in the NIOSH Science Blog "The National Tractor Safety Coalition: Taking a new systems-approach to a well-known problem."

Currently the Coalition includes 87 members from a number of agricultural or health related organizations. These organizations include: NIOSH, American Farm Bureau Federation, Farm Foundation, and several Universities, Extension agencies, NIOSH Agricultural Safety and Health Centers, State Departments of Health, and insurance companies, among others. Some members serve on the NTSC Steering Committee, which meets on a monthly basis and provide guidance on the overarching initiative to expand ROPS installation programs nationally while others provide assistance on various aspects of national ROPS implementation efforts, such as promotions, testimonials, congressional outreach or networking. A manufacturing and technology task force has also been assembled, and provides guidance to the group on technical issues.

=== National ROPS Rebate Program ===
The NTSC launched the National ROPS Rebate Program in 2017 which helps to facilitate individual state based programs as well as trying to obtain national-level funding. Given the NTSC's broad mission to address tractor-related deaths, the group seeks to tackle issues such as run-overs or implement entanglements once a National ROPS Rebate Program has been sustainably established.

== See also ==
- Active rollover protection
- Anti-roll bar
- Gyroscope
- Roll cage
- Side Impact Protection System
- WHIPS
