= Volvo P2 platform =

Overview
- Manufacturer: Volvo Cars
- Also called: Ford D3 platform
- Production: 1998–2016
- Assembly: Sweden: Torslanda (Torslandaverken: 1998–2014); China: Daqing, Heilongjiang (2014–2016)

Body and chassis
- Class: Mid-size car; Full-size car; Full-size luxury car
- Layout: Transverse front engine, front-wheel drive or all-wheel drive
- Body styles: 4-door saloon; 5-door estate; 5-door full-size CUV; 5-door mid-size SUV
- Vehicles: See listing
- Related: Ford D3 platform

Powertrain
- Engines: I5; I6; V8
- Transmissions: 5-speed Volvo M56 manual; 5-speed Volvo M58 manual; 5-speed Volvo M65 manual; 6-speed Volvo M66 manual; 4-speed GM 4T65E automatic; 5-speed Aisin AW-55/50 automatic; 6-speed Aisin TF-80SC automatic

Chronology
- Predecessor: Volvo P80 platform
- Successor: Volvo P3 platform

The Volvo P2 platform is a global full-size unibody automobile platform developed and produced by Volvo. It is designed for single wheelbases and is adaptable to front- or all wheel drive configurations. It was developed by the automaker before its 1999 acquisition by Ford Motor Company, and debuted with the 1998 Volvo S80.

The platform was in use from 1998 and was slowly phased out beginning in 2006. The first generation XC90 remained in production until 2014 at which point it was the only model still in production based on this platform. For the Chinese market a special version of the XC90 called XC Classic was made from 2014 to 2016. After the second generation XC90 had been launched in all markets the platform was retired.

== Vehicles ==
P2 platform vehicles (Volvo)
Vehicle Name	Image	Production	Bodystyle(s)	Model Code	Notes
Volvo S80		1998–2006	4-door saloon	P23; 184	launched for the 1999 model year
Volvo S60		2000–2009	4-door saloon	P24; 384	
Volvo V70		2000–2007	5-door estate	P26E; 285	
Volvo XC70		2000–2007	5-door estate	P26L; 295	initially called V70 XC, renamed as XC70 in 2003
Volvo XC90		2002–2014	5-door crossover SUV	P28; 275	launched for the 2003 model year
Volvo XC Classic		2014–2016	5-door crossover SUV	P28	rebranded version of the XC90 for Chinese market
