= Volvo P80 platform =

Overview
- Manufacturer: Volvo Cars
- Also called: Volvo P80 series; Volvo P800 series; Volvo 800 series
- Production: 1991–2005 (1,360,522 units)
- Assembly: Sweden: Torslanda (Torslandaverken); Uddevalla (Uddevallaverken); Belgium: Ghent (VCG); Canada: Halifax (VHA)

Body and chassis
- Class: Mid-size car; Mid-size luxury car
- Layout: Front engine; front-wheel drive or four-wheel drive
- Body style(s): 4-door saloon; 5-door estate; 5-door Full-size CUV; 2-door cabriolet; 2-door coupé
- Vehicles: Volvo 850; Volvo S70; Volvo V70 / V70 XC; Volvo C70; Volvo ECC concept car

Powertrain
- Engine(s): I5
- Transmission(s): 5-speed Volvo M56 manual; 5-speed Volvo M58 manual; 5-speed Volvo M59 manual; 4-speed Aisin AW50-42LE automatic; 4-speed Aisin AW50-42LE diesel automatic; 5-speed Aisin AW55-50/51SN automatic

Chronology
- Successor: Volvo P2 platform

The Volvo P80 platform was a Swedish mid-size unibody automobile platform developed and produced by Volvo Cars. It was in use from 1991 to 2005. It is designed for different wheelbases in front-wheel drive configurations and was adapted to all wheel drive. It debuted with the 1991 Volvo 850. Although heavily modified by TWR, the same basic chassis was used as the underpinnings for the C70. After the model year 2000 most P80 models were replaced by their P2 successors, with the exception of the C70 convertible which remained in production until 2005. A total of 1,360,522 cars based on this platform were built.

The platform utilises a front engine transaxle design with engines and gearboxes mounted transversely on a subframe. Only straight 5 engines were offered. A front subframe and front MacPherson struts were used and either Volvo's patented Deltalink rear axle on FWD models or Volvo's Multi-Link rear suspension with an independent rear subframe on AWD models.

== Vehicles ==
P80 platform vehicles
Vehicle Name	Image	Production	Bodystyle(s)	Model Code	Notes
Volvo 850		1991–1996	4-door saloon 5-door estate	LS (854); LW (855)	facelift model shown
Volvo S70		1996–2000	4-door saloon	LS (874)	
Volvo V70		1996–2000	5-door estate	LW (875)	
Volvo V70 XC		1997–2000	5-door estate	LW (876)	
Volvo C70 coupé		1996–2002	2-door coupé	NK (872)	
Volvo C70 convertible		1998–2005	2-door convertible	NC (873)	facelift model shown
