= Volvo ECC =

1992 concept car by Volvo

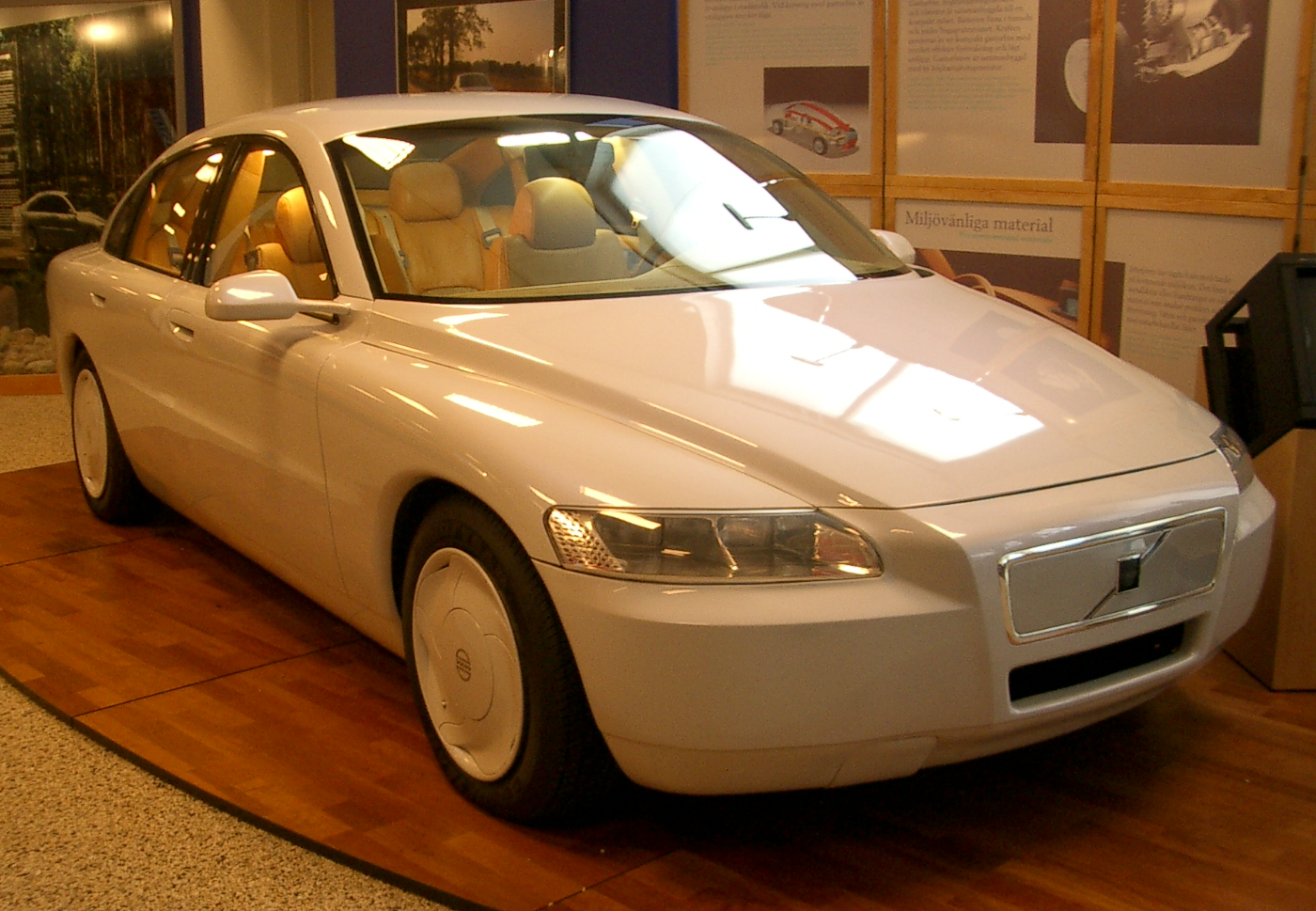
Volvo ECC.

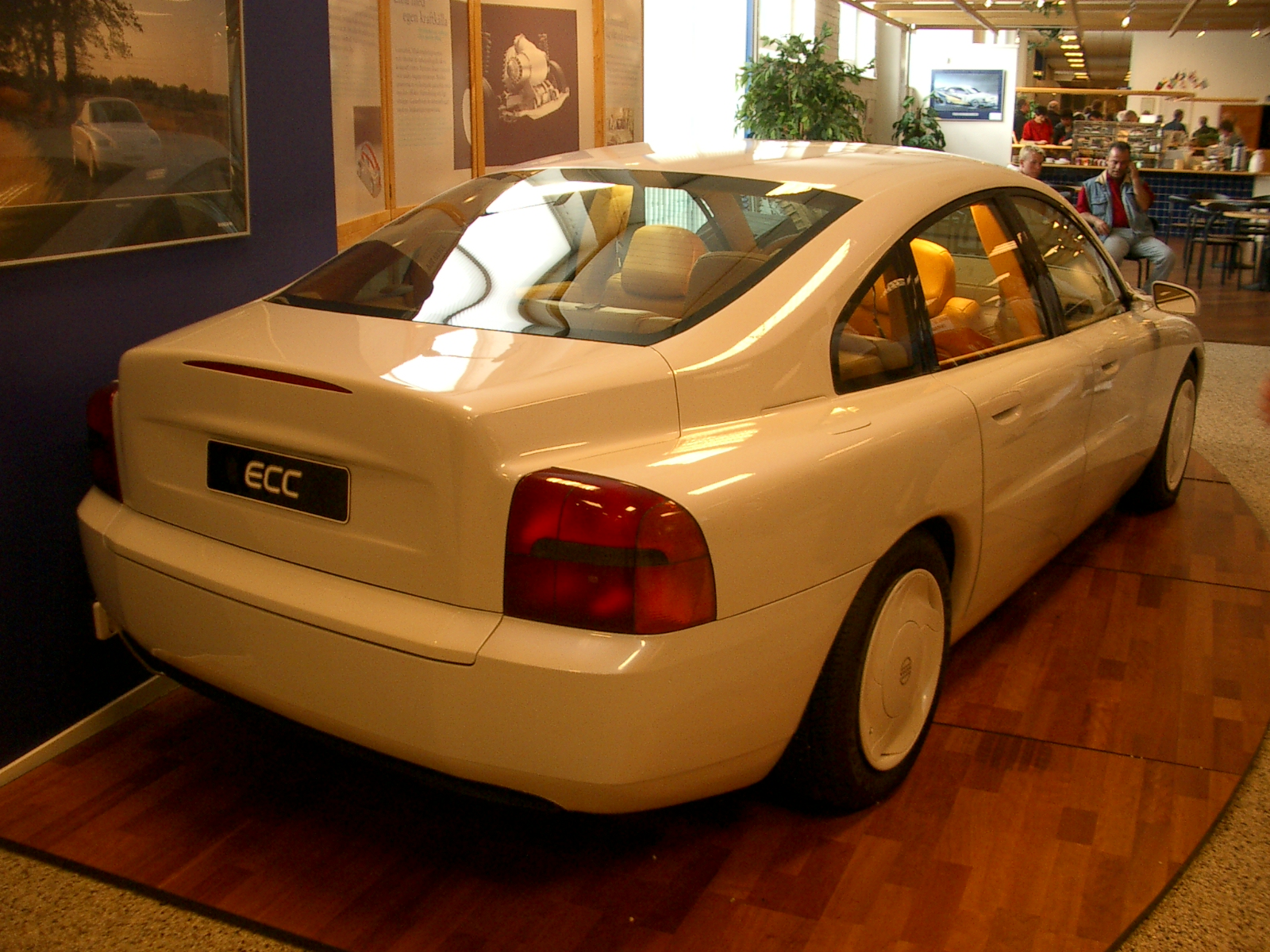
Volvo ECC rear

The Volvo ECC (Environmental Concept Car) was an executive luxury concept car built by Volvo in 1992. It was a design exercise in using recycled material and hybrid technology. It was powered by a hybrid electric and gas turbine engine. Many of its lines and general styling were used as inspiration for the first generation Volvo S80. The ECC set a new design language for future Volvo models from the S80 onwards, the most obvious styling feature being the stepped waistline, which was inspired by the similar feature on the 200 Series, whilst retaining some of the angular elements from the 700/900 ranges.

The Volvo ECC was built on the Volvo P80 platform. In contrast to most production hybrids, which use a gasoline piston engine to provide additional acceleration and to recharge the battery storage, the Volvo ECC used a gas turbine engine to drive the generator for recharging. This type of engine has a higher thermodynamic efficiency than the conventional internal combustion engine with pistons. Also in Volvo's design, the fuel is evaporated and mixed with air before ignition. This provides a very low NOx emission. The driver can also switch between gas turbine electric and hybrid by switches on the dashboard.

The maximum power available was 95 bhp (71 kW; 96 PS), with 76 available for continuous use. It had a drag coefficient of 0.23. With the vehicle weighing approximately 1,580 kg (3,483 lb) more than a conventional Volvo 850, acceleration from 0-60 mph (97 km/h) took 23 seconds in EV mode and 12.5 seconds with the turbine engaged. Top speed was 109 mph (175 km/h). The vehicle's range on batteries alone was 90 mi (145 km), and when combined with a full tank of fuel for the turbine, about 415 mi (668 km).

The Volvo ECC was debuted at a time when California was seeking Zero Pollution Vehicles (ZPV). With its gas turbine, the Volvo ECC was not a zero-emissions vehicle, and hence did not meet the needs of the time. With the focus now shifted away from true zero-emissions vehicles, many of the concepts tested in the ECC may prove of value in future concept and production vehicles.

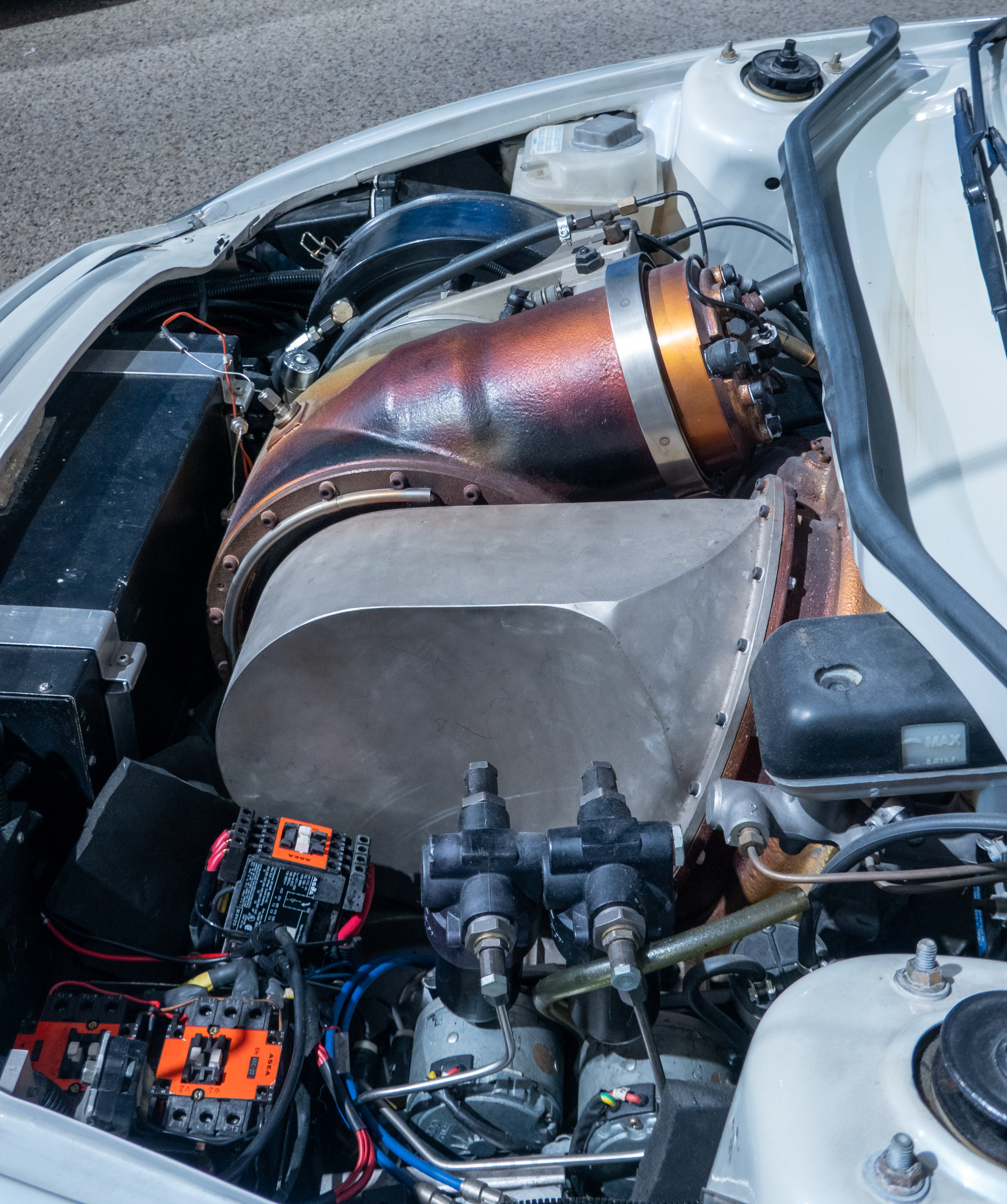
Gas turbine engine in the Volvo ECC
