= Volvo C70 =

Swedish sports car

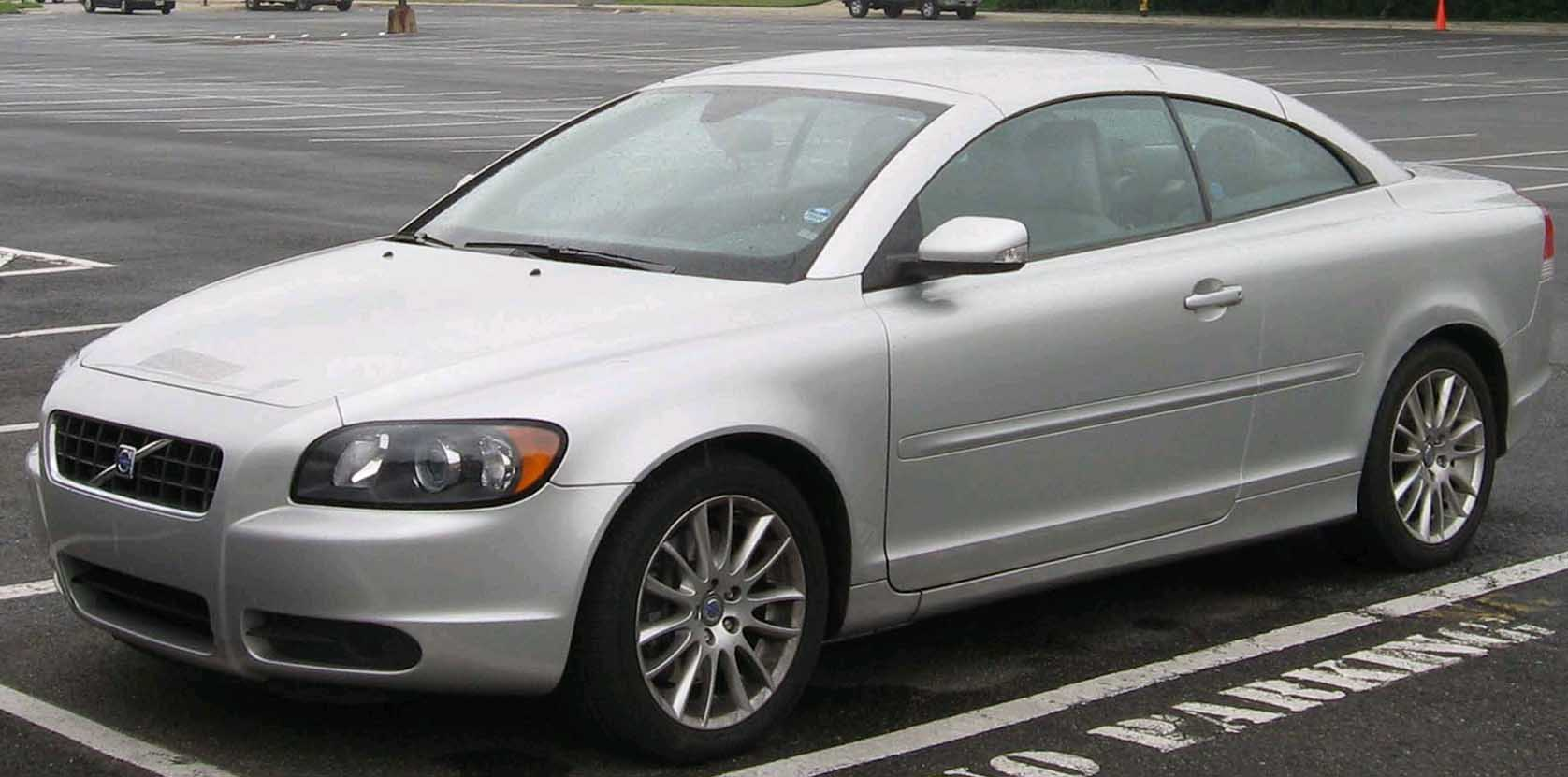
- 2nd generation C70

Overview
- Manufacturer: Volvo Cars
- Production: 1996–2013; P80: 1996–2005 (1st generation); P1: 2006–2013 (2nd generation)
- Assembly: Sweden: Uddevalla

Body and chassis
- Class: Sports car
- Body style: cabriolet; coupé
- Layout: FF layout

Chronology
- Predecessor: Volvo 780

The Volvo C70 is a two-door car which was manufactured and marketed by Volvo Cars from 1996 to 2013 across two generations.

The first generation (1996–2005) was available as both a coupé (1996–2002) and softtop convertible (1997–2005). The second generation (2006–2013) was available as a retractable hardtop convertible.

== First generation (1996–2005) ==
First generation
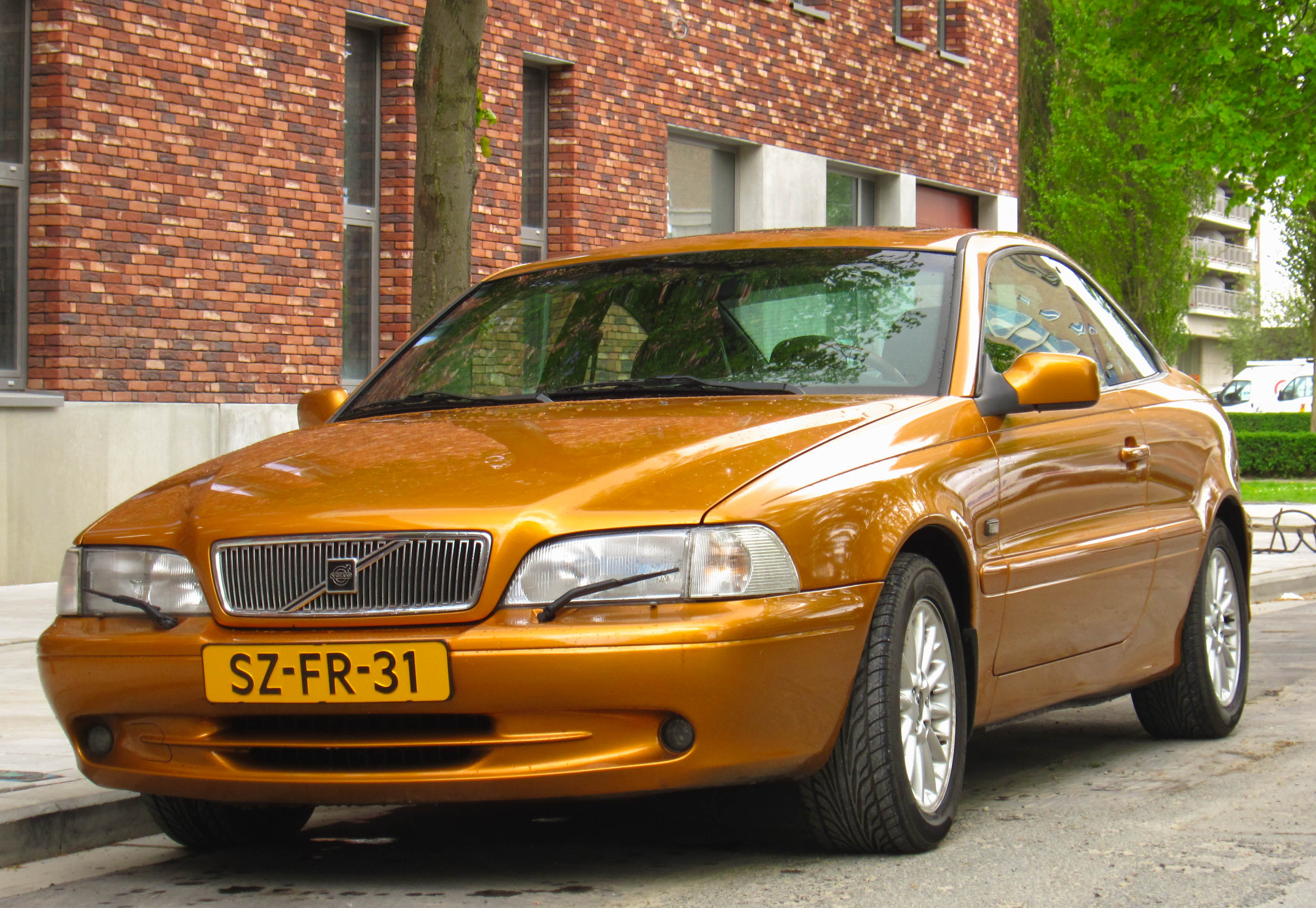
- 1998 Volvo C70 2.3 T5

Overview
- Manufacturer: Volvo Cars; TWR
- Production: 1996–2005 (76,809 units); 1996–2002 (C70 coupé); 1997–2005 (C70 convertible)
- Model years: 1997–2002 (C70 coupé); 1998–2005 (C70 convertible)
- Assembly: Sweden: Uddevalla (Uddevallaverken)
- Designer: Ian Callum, Peter Horbury (exterior); José Luis Diaz de la Vega (interior)

Body and chassis
- Body style: 2-door cabriolet; 2-door coupé
- Layout: Front engine front-wheel drive
- Platform: Volvo P80 platform

Powertrain
- Engine: 2.0–2.4L I5
- Transmission: 5-speed Volvo M56 manual; 4-speed Aisin AW50-42LE automatic; 5-speed Aisin AW55-50SN automatic

Dimensions
- Wheelbase: 2,660 mm (104.7 in)
- Length: 1997–2002: 4,720 mm (185.8 in); 2003–2005: 4,724 mm (186.0 in)
- Width: 1,820 mm (71.7 in)
- Height: 1,400–1,426 mm (55–56 in)
- Kerb weight: Coupé: 1,499–1,547 kg (3,305–3,411 lb); Convertible: 1,625–1,675 kg (3,583–3,693 lb)

Chronology
- Predecessor: Volvo 780
- Successor: Volvo C70 II

Volvo debuted the first generation C70 at the 1996 Paris Motor Show, and introduced it in Europe as a 1997 model, and a year later as a 1998 model in North America — with 2.0 (sold mostly in Italy), a low-pressure turbo (2.4L) and a high-pressure turbo (2.0L and 2.3L), 5-cylinder, turbocharged petrol engines and manual and automatic transmissions. Ian Callum designed the exterior and Mexican designer Jose Diaz de la Vega led the interior design team.

The C70 broke Volvo's decades-long styling tradition of boxy, rectilinear designs and was Volvo's first luxury coupe since the 780. According to a tongue-in-cheek remark made by Peter Horbury, Volvo's design chief from 1991 to 2002, with the C70, Volvo "kept the toy, and threw away the box!" "Our vision was to design a convertible that would meet the needs of a family of four looking for comfortable blue-sky motoring in a vehicle also providing stylish looks, performance and faultless driving and road-holding."

In a development program of 30 months and working with a Volvo 850-derived platform, Britain’s TWR (Tom Walkinshaw Racing) co-designed the car's basic design and suspension tuning with Volvo. Manufacture of the C70 was a joint venture until the two companies experienced disputes that threatened to interrupt production; TWR did not contribute to the second generation C70.

Volvo's first modern convertible, the C70 was manufactured in Uddevalla, Sweden on an assembly line separate from the 70-series sedan and station wagon. The four-passenger convertible featured an electrically heated glass rear window; automatic (pop-up) rollover hoops system, marketed as ROPS; seat belt pre-tensioners; A-pillars reinforced with boron steel; front and side airbags; and a safety cage — a horseshoe-like structure around the passenger compartment.

The cloth convertible top, initially available in four colors, was fully automatic, operated by a single, dashboard-mounted control. The top stored automatically under an integral rigid tonneau cover, using a system pioneered in modern convertibles with the fourth generation Mercedes SL.

The C70 convertible exhibited two negative traits endemic to convertibles: poor rear visibility and pronounced scuttle shake, a characteristic where the structural design of the bulkhead between the engine and passenger compartments of a convertible suffers sufficiently poor rigidity to negatively impact ride and handling — and allow noticeable vibration, shudder or chassis-flexing into the passenger compartment.

Early special editions featured two-tone leather interior with wood trim and a SC-901 (1998) Dolby Pro Logic I stereo with 3-disc integrated changer unit (via a cartridge) 400 watts of power and 11 high end Dynaudio speakers.

=== First generation models ===
==== C70 coupé ====
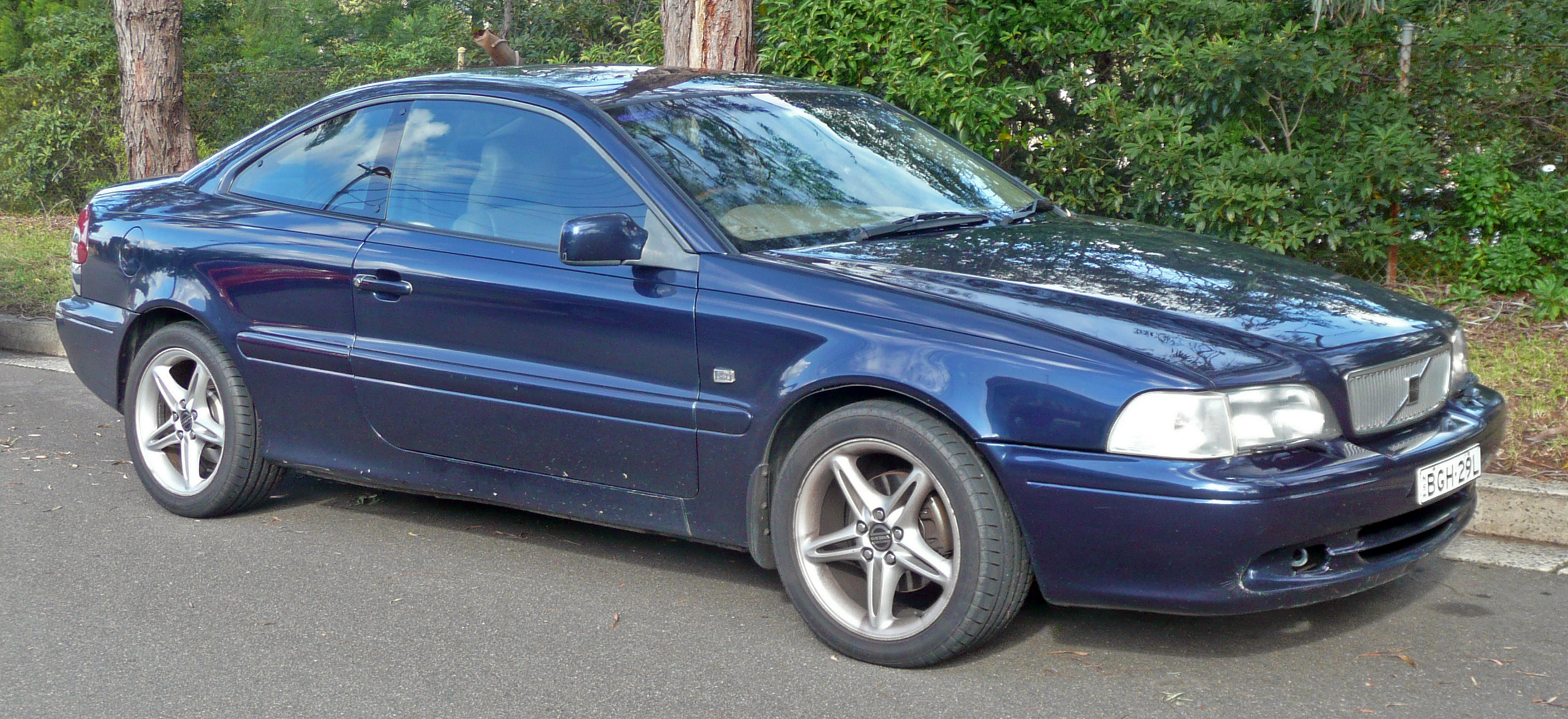
Volvo C70 coupé (AU)

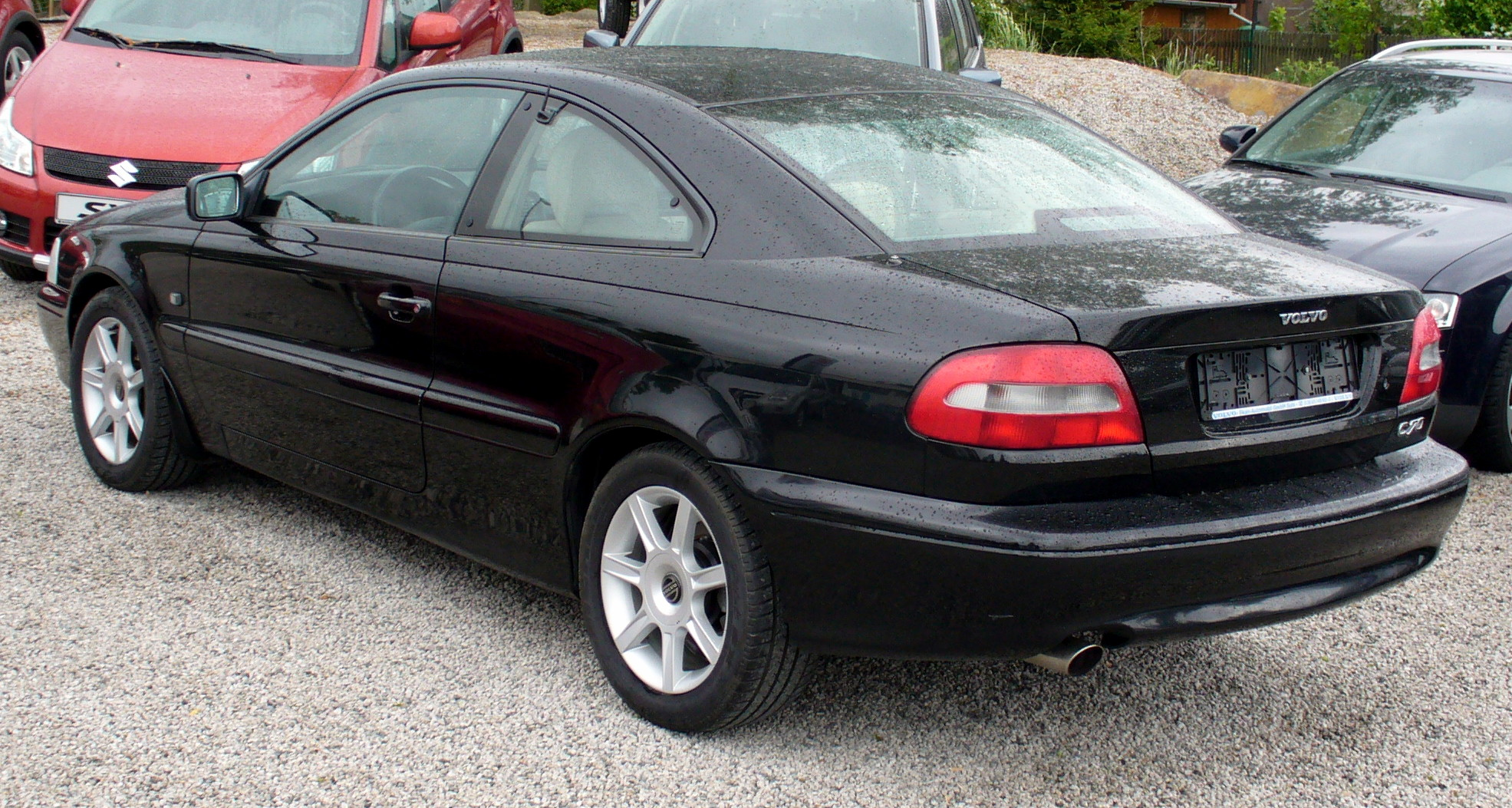
Volvo C70 coupé (DE)

==== C70 cabriolet ====
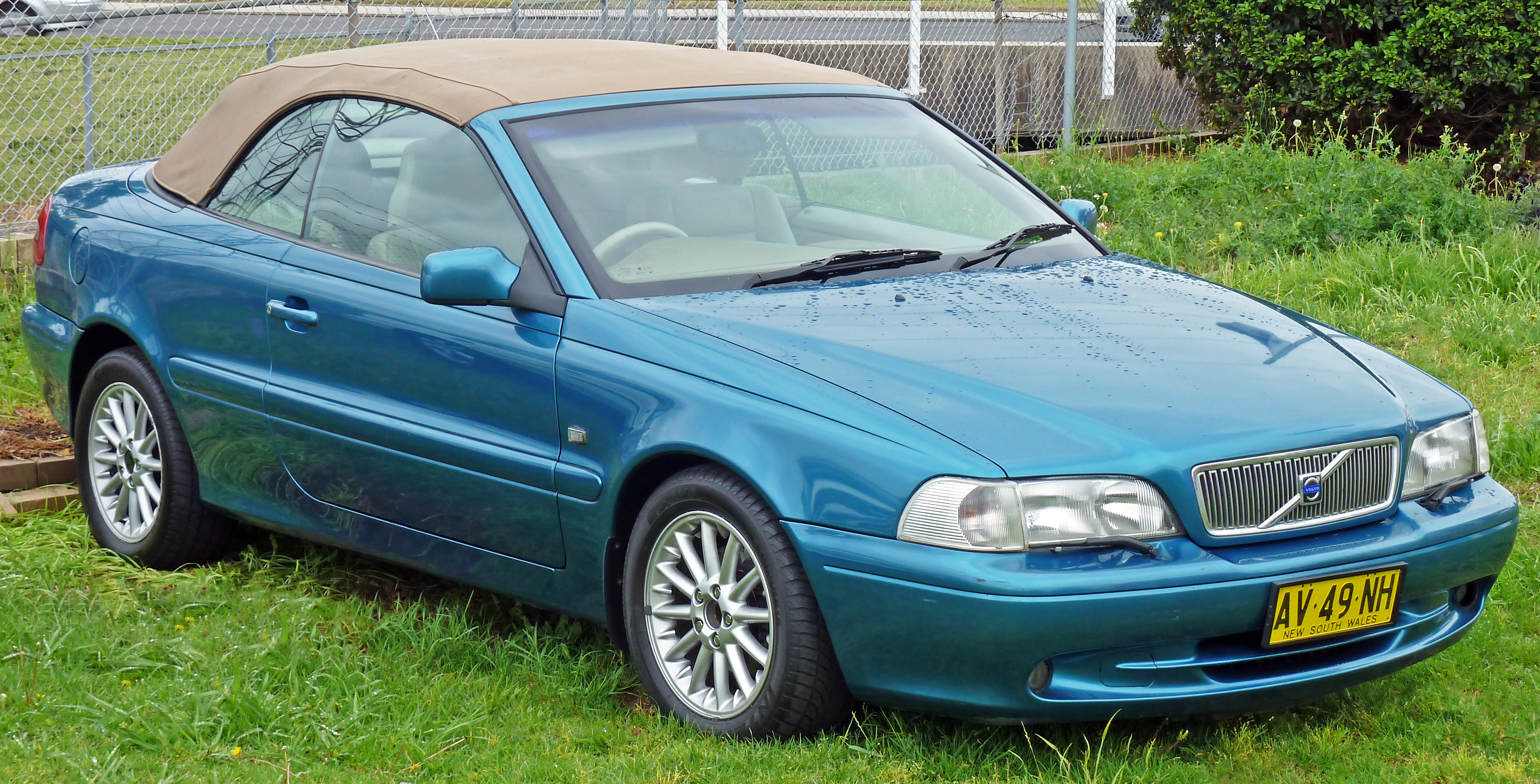
Pre-facelift 1999–2002 Volvo C70 Convertible (Australia)

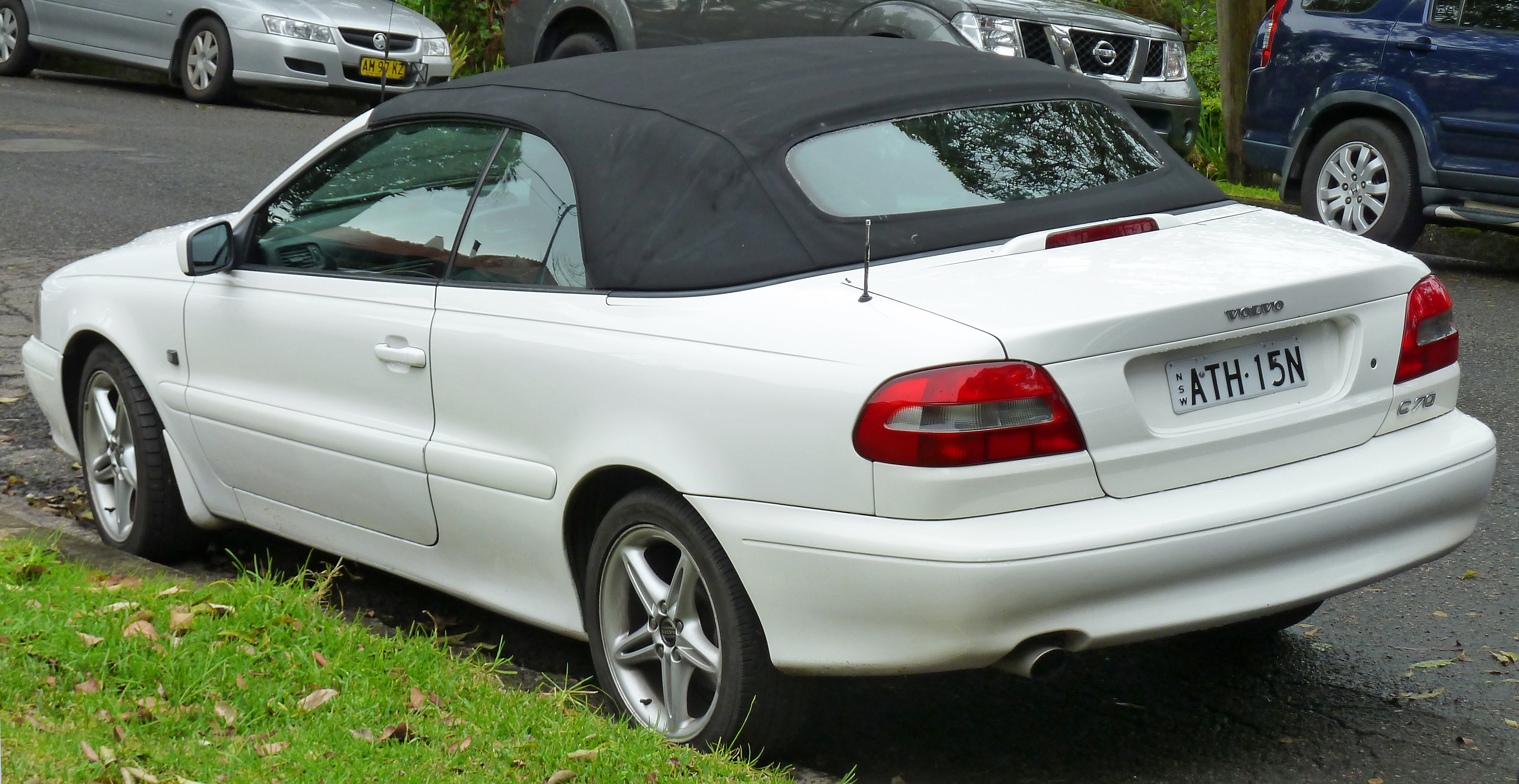
Pre-facelift Volvo C70 Convertible (Australia)

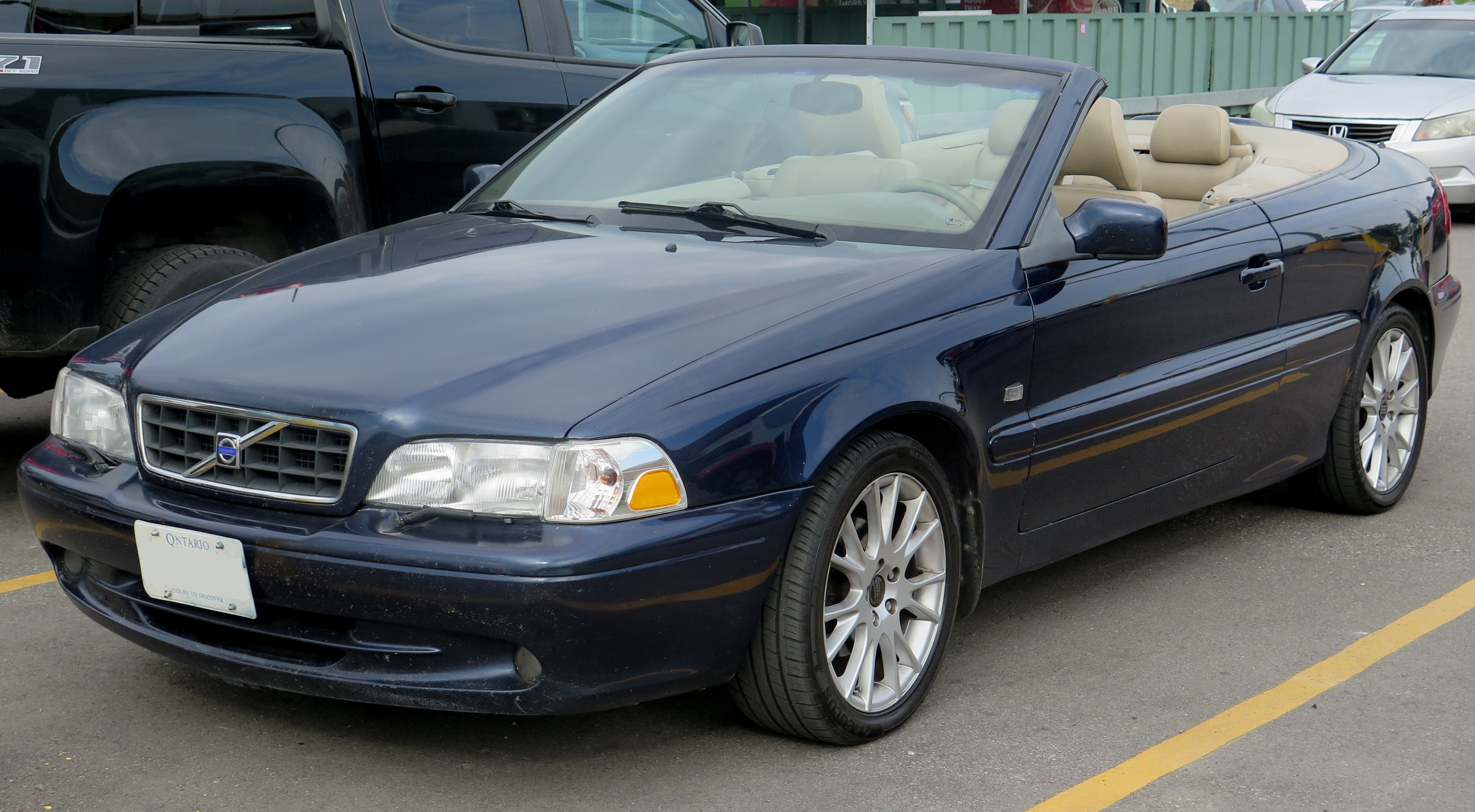
Facelift 2004 Volvo C70 HPT Convertible (Canada)

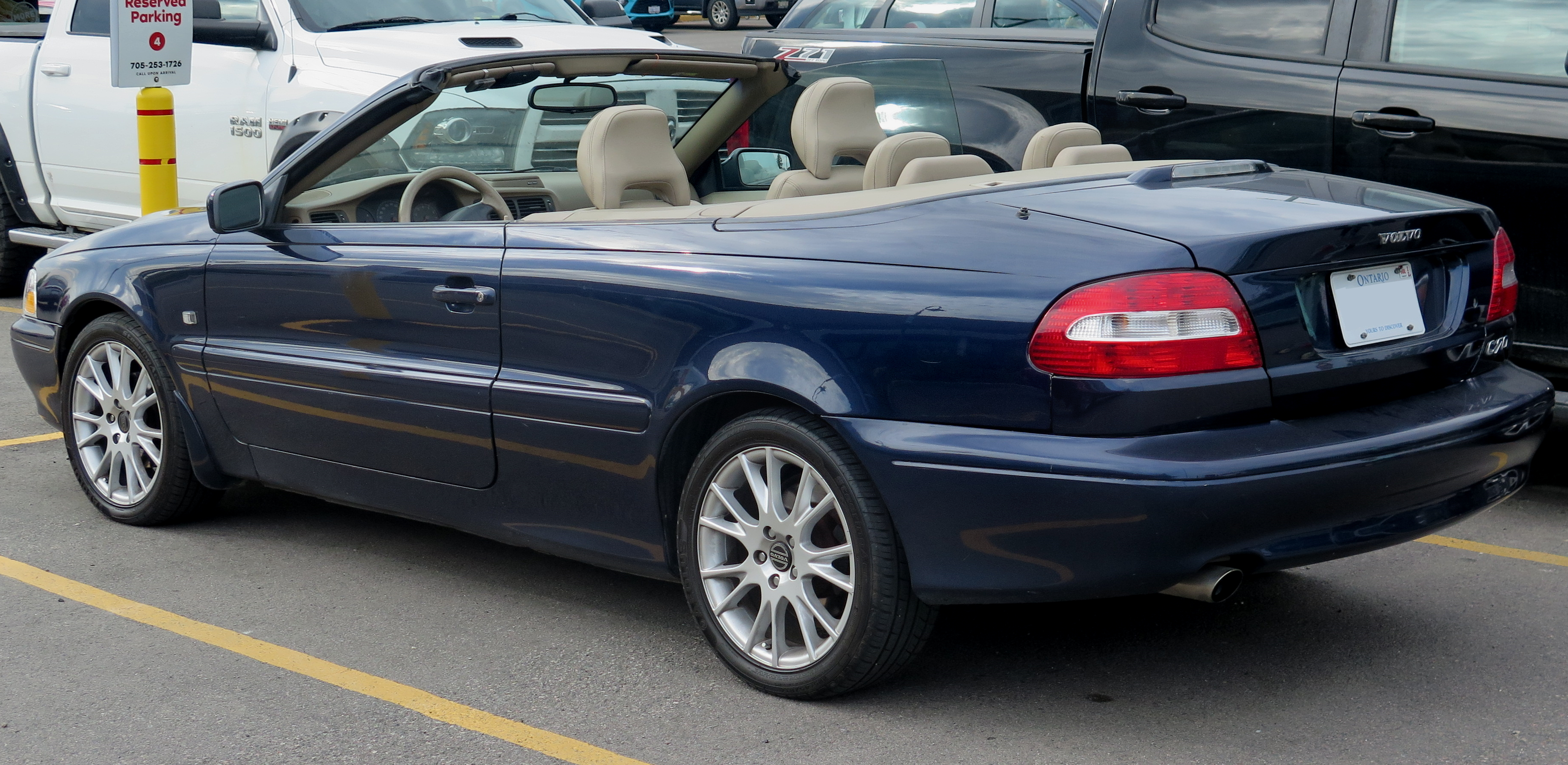
Facelift 2004 Volvo C70 HPT Convertible (Canada; rear view)

==== C70 ====
The C70 was introduced to the press in a signature color (saffron pearl metallic) and for the debut marketing, the 1997 film The Saint featured a C70 — recalling the notable connection of the Volvo P1800 and the television series from the early 1960s, The Saint with Roger Moore as Simon Templar. The total number of cars produced with the signature saffron pearl metallic paint was reportedly 145. There was no 2005 model C70 in North America, the 2004 left over models were sold into 2005 there. 72,000 first generation C70s were produced in the seven years up to 2006, fewer than 50,000 were convertibles.

Volvo cosmetically updated the convertible with new clear headlights and rear light clusters for model year 2004.

===== C70 Collection special edition =====
Introduced in February 2004, the C70 Collection package featured Titanium Grey Pearl exterior with Toscana Tan exclusive soft leather. It included special deco stitching in the seats, armrests, sun visors and door panels, together with aluminium inserts in the centre stack and other interior fittings. It was also available in Black Sapphire, Titanium Grey Pearl or Silver metallic exterior combined with Off Black exclusive soft leather with contrast deco stitching. In this form it had Carbon-fibre inserts in the centre stack and other interior fittings. Both packages included an exclusive polished 17-inch wheel design, and luxury floor mats. The exclusive leather also extended to the door panels.

==== Relative sales performance ====
Of the 72,000 first generation C70s produced worldwide, 26,036 were Coupés and 46,786 were Convertibles. Volvo Cars of North America reported that 24,948 Convertibles were sold in the US, plus 6,465 Coupés. Of those US-market Coupés, 603 had the 2.3 Liter engine with high pressure turbo (T5) and the M56 5-speed manual transmission. It's believed only 135 of the C70 T5M coupés painted "Saffron" made it to the US market.

=== Engines ===
Petrol engines
Model	Engine code	Year(s)	Power	Torque at rpm	Displacement	Type	Note
2.4 20V	B5244S	1997–2000	170 PS (125 kW; 168 hp)	220 N⋅m (162 lb⋅ft) at 3300	2,435 cc (148.6 in^{3})	I5	
2.0T	B5204T4	1999–2005	163 PS (120 kW; 161 hp)	230 N⋅m (170 lb⋅ft) at 1800	1,984 cc (121.1 in^{3})	I5 turbo	
2.4T	B5244T	1997–2002	193 PS (142 kW; 190 hp)	270 N⋅m (199 lb⋅ft) at 1800	2,435 cc (148.6 in^{3})	I5 turbo	
2.4T	B5244T7	2002–2005	200 PS (147 kW; 197 hp)	285 N⋅m (210 lb⋅ft) at 1800	2,435 cc (148.6 in^{3})	I5 turbo	
T5 2.0	B5204T3	1998–2002	230 PS (169 kW; 227 hp)	310 N⋅m (229 lb⋅ft) at 2700	1,984 cc (121.1 in^{3})	I5 turbo	Italy, Portugal & Taiwan only
T5 2.3	B5234T3	1997–2002	240 PS (177 kW; 237 hp)	330 N⋅m (243 lb⋅ft) at 2700	2,319 cc (141.5 in^{3})	I5 turbo	
T5 2.3	B5234T9	2002–2005	245 PS (180 kW; 242 hp)	330 N⋅m (243 lb⋅ft) at 2700	2,319 cc (141.5 in^{3})	I5 turbo	

== Second generation (2006–2013) ==
Second generation
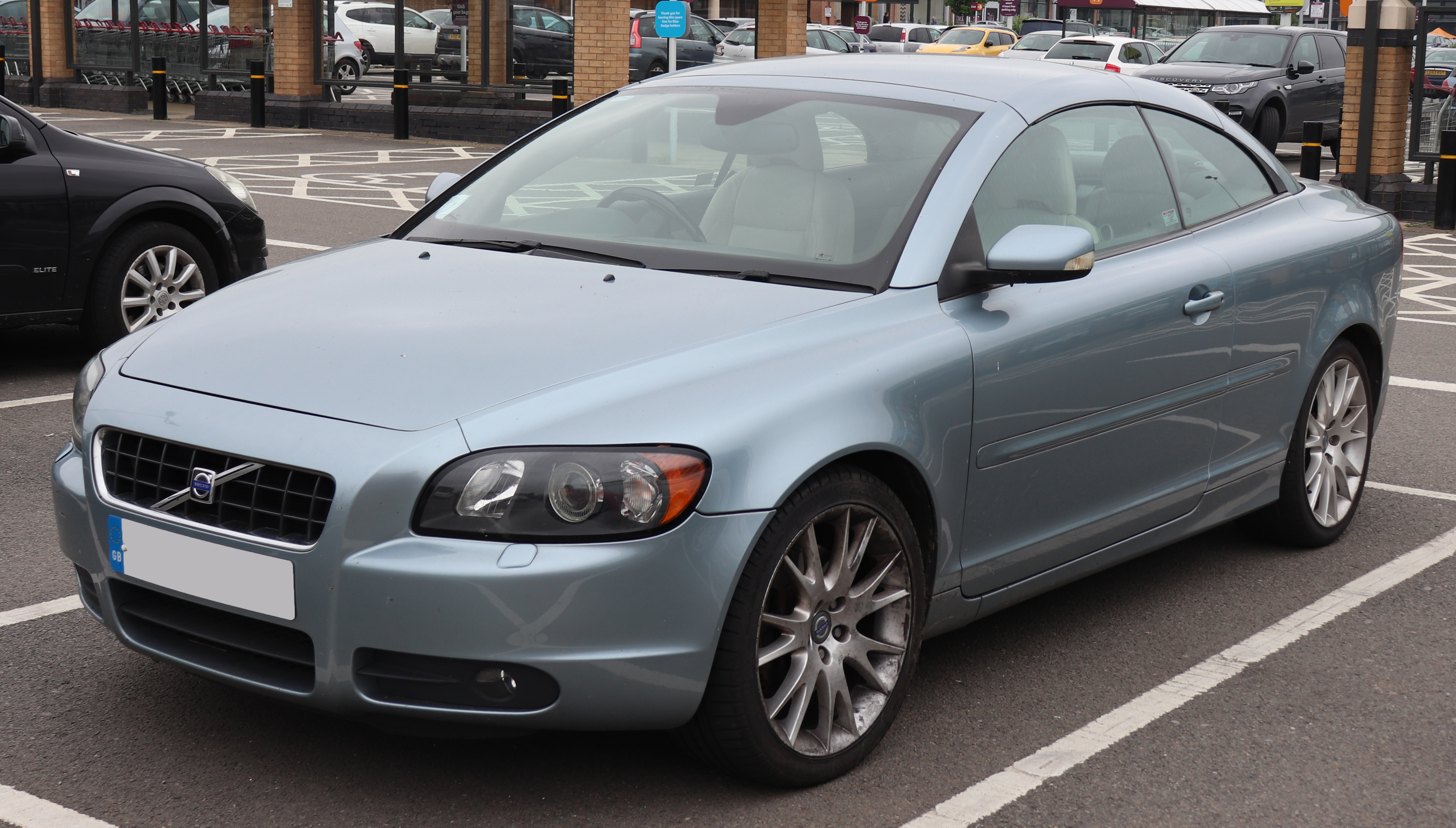

Overview
- Manufacturer: Volvo Cars; Pininfarina Sverige AB
- Production: 2005–2013 (89,080 units)
- Model years: 2006–2013
- Assembly: Sweden: Uddevalla (Uddevallaverken); Italy: Turin (Pininfarina)
- Designer: Steve Mattin (Senior Vice President of Design); Fedde Talsma (design manager); John Kinsey; Ravi D'Souza (Interior); Tony Pettman (interior)

Body and chassis
- Body style: 2-door coupé convertible
- Layout: Front engine front-wheel drive
- Platform: Volvo P1 platform

Powertrain
- Engine: petrol: 2435 cc B5244S4/S5 I5; 2521 cc B5254T3/T7 turbo I5; diesel: 1984 cc D5204T/T5 turbo I5; 1997 cc D4204T turbo I4; 2400 cc D5244T8/T13 turbo I5
- Transmission: 5-speed Volvo M56 manual; 6-speed Volvo M66 manual; 5-speed Aisin AW55-50SN automatic; 6-speed Aisin TF-80SC automatic

Dimensions
- Wheelbase: 2,640 mm (103.9 in)
- Length: 2007–2010: 4,582 mm (180.4 in); 2011–2013: 4,613 mm (181.6 in)
- Width: 2007–2010: 1,820 mm (71.7 in); 2011–2013: 1,834 mm (72.2 in)
- Height: 1,400 mm (55.1 in)
- Kerb weight: 1,685–1,745 kg (3,715–3,847 lb)

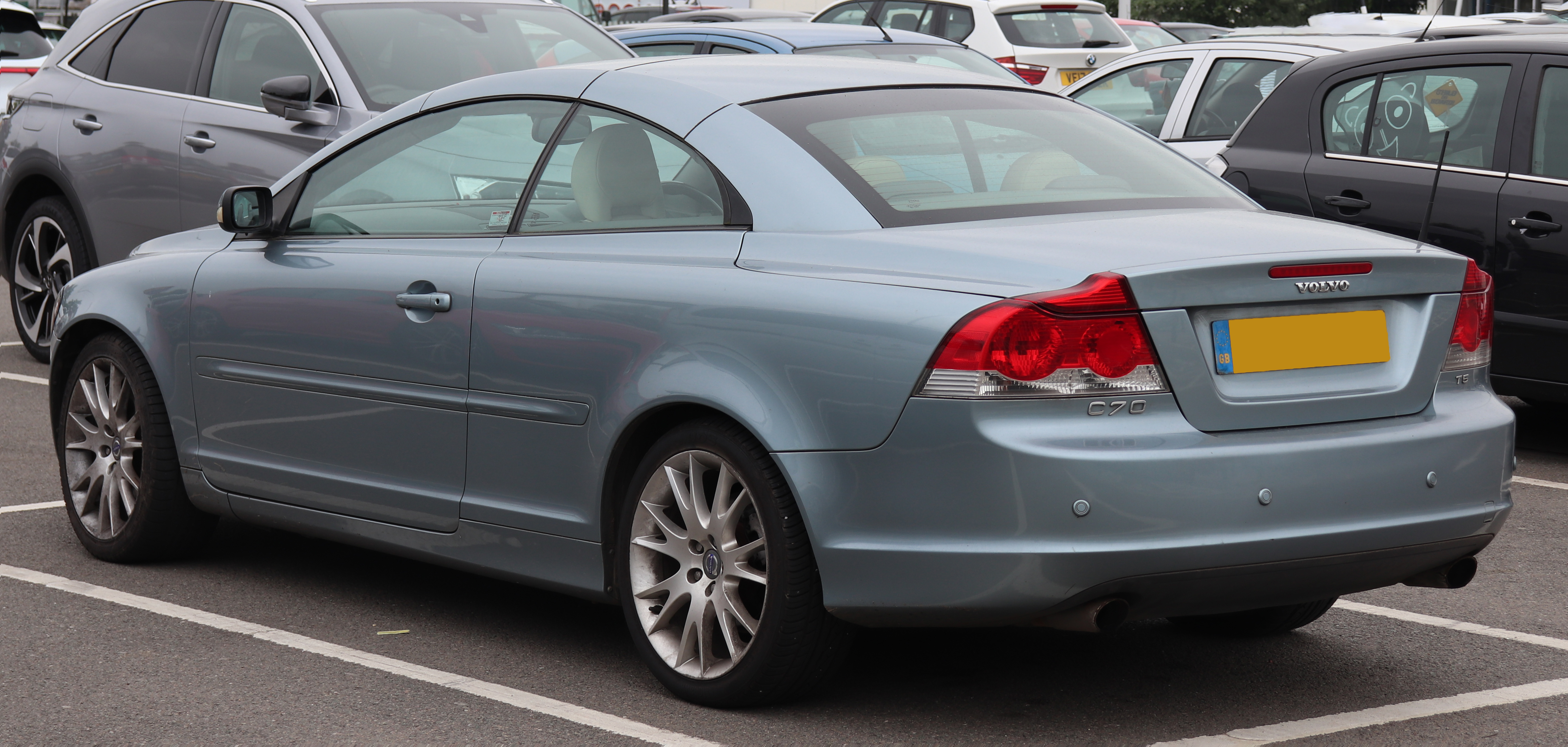
Pre–facelift Volvo C70 convertible (UK)

The second generation C70 model debuted at the 2005 Frankfurt Motor Show, sharing the Volvo S40 platform, designed by John Kinsey and built by Pininfarina Sverige AB — a joint venture between Pininfarina and Volvo (and the first time Pininfarina has manufactured outside Italy). The C70 retractable hardtop replaces its predecessors two models: both the convertible and the coupé, the latter which had been absent from Volvo's lineup since 2003. The retractable hardtop went on sale in the U.S. in spring 2006.

The Insurance Institute for Highway Safety in the United States conducted its first crash tests of several convertibles, designating the C70 a "Top Safety Pick".

=== Top mechanism ===
The three-section hardtop assembly, manufactured by Pininfarina in Uddevalla by its subsidiary RHTU Sverige A.B. and developed with Webasto, raises or lowers in under 30 seconds and includes a global window switch that allows simultaneous raising or lowering of all windows, and a button to electrically raise the folded top stack within the trunk — specifically to increase access to cargo storage when the top is lowered.

The retractable hard top is operable only when the car is stationary and requires no extra space behind the car while the roof is being raised or lowered. The operation requires a height clearance of six feet seven inches (2,006.6 mm) and full depression of the console button during operation. The top features a fabric headliner that unfurls and is tensioned by wires as the roof moves into place, as well as mesh wind blocker that clips over the rear seats when driving with two front passengers. The blocker has zippered openings for parcel storage and folds in half for trunk stowage.

The trunk lid, which opens both in a rear-hinged mode to stow the folding roof as well as a standard front-hinged mode for luggage loading. The trunk lid is aluminum and the three roof sections are steel. A trunk divider enables assessment of precisely how much can be loaded with the roof down. Trunk space is 13 cubic feet with the top raised (368.12 L) and seven cubic feet (198.22 L) with the top lowered.

A hatch in the backrest of the rear seat enables transport of long objects inside the car, e.g., skis. Overall body rigidity is improved by approximately 15 percent when the roof is raised.

=== Safety ===
Safety systems include a door-mounted side impact protection inflatable which inflates upward when activated. The curtain has an extra stiff construction with double rows of slats that are slightly offset from each other. This allows them to remain upright and offer effective head protection even with the window open. The curtain also deflates slowly to provide protection should the car roll over. This is a unique solution in the automotive world.

The C70 retractable hardtop also features a roll over protection structure (ROPS) with two pyrotechnically charged roll hoops hidden behind the rear seats that deploy under roll-over conditions whether the roof is retracted or not. Volvo featured this advancement in a copy of the "Volvo Saved My Life Club" brochures. There, a woman was able to walk away from an accident after she slid off an ice-covered mountain road and rolled her C70 which then slid more than 30 feet (9.1 m) down the mountain face.

=== Production ===
As of 2006, production was increased from 16,000 annual units to 20,000. A total of 88,760 Volvo C70 II were sold between 2006 and 2015. The last Volvo C70 rolled off the production line on the 25th of June 2013.

=== 2010 update ===
Volvo introduced an updated version of the C70, in Flamenco Red Pearl paint, at the 2009 Frankfurt Motor Show, and later at the 2010 South Florida International Auto Show. Revisions included a redesigned front end and new rear LED lamps.

The engine and transmission remain the same as before, and the interior is largely unchanged. It went on sale in early 2010.

The US model went on sale in 2010 as a 2011 model year vehicle. Early model includes C70 T5.

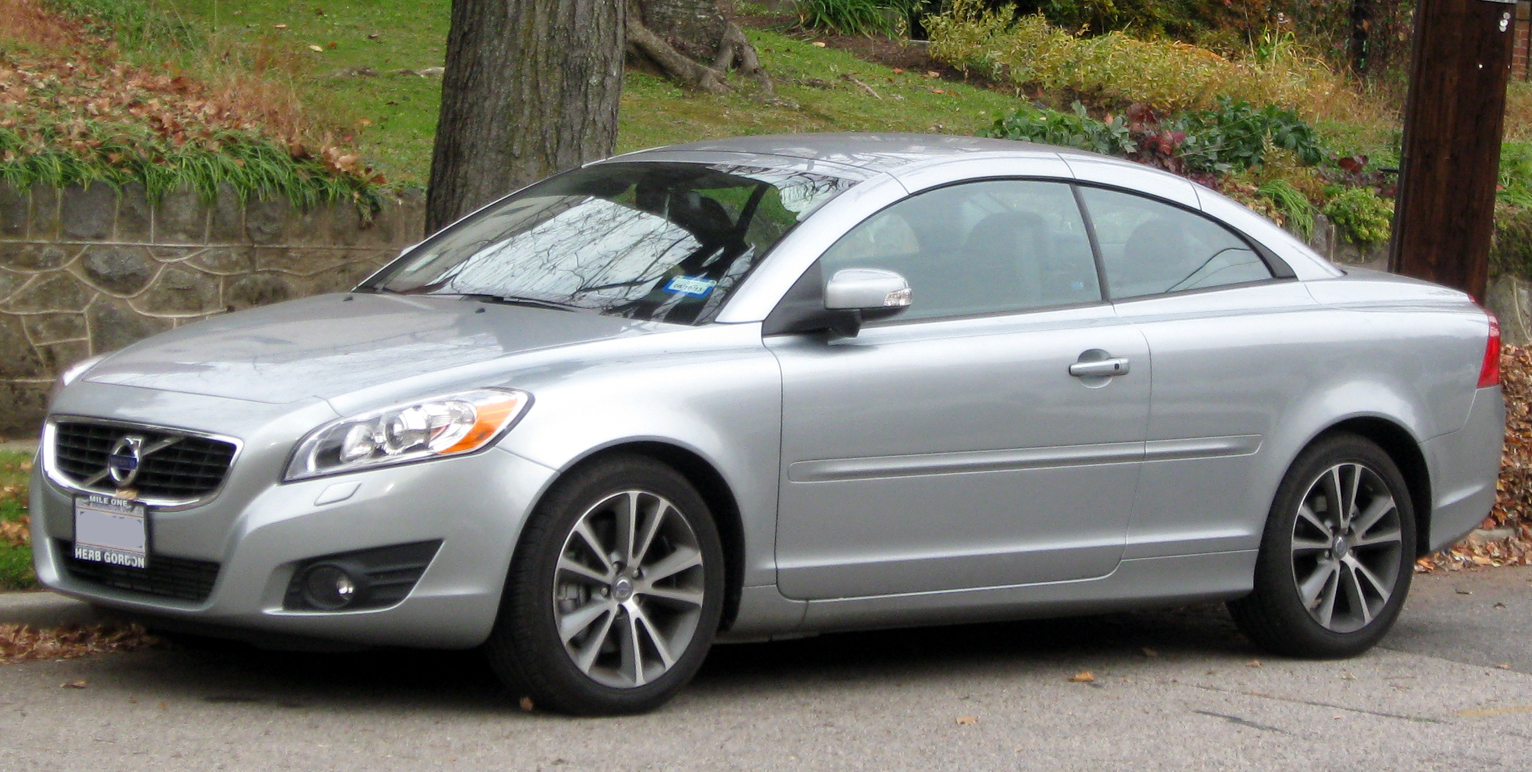
Volvo C70 convertible post facelift (US)

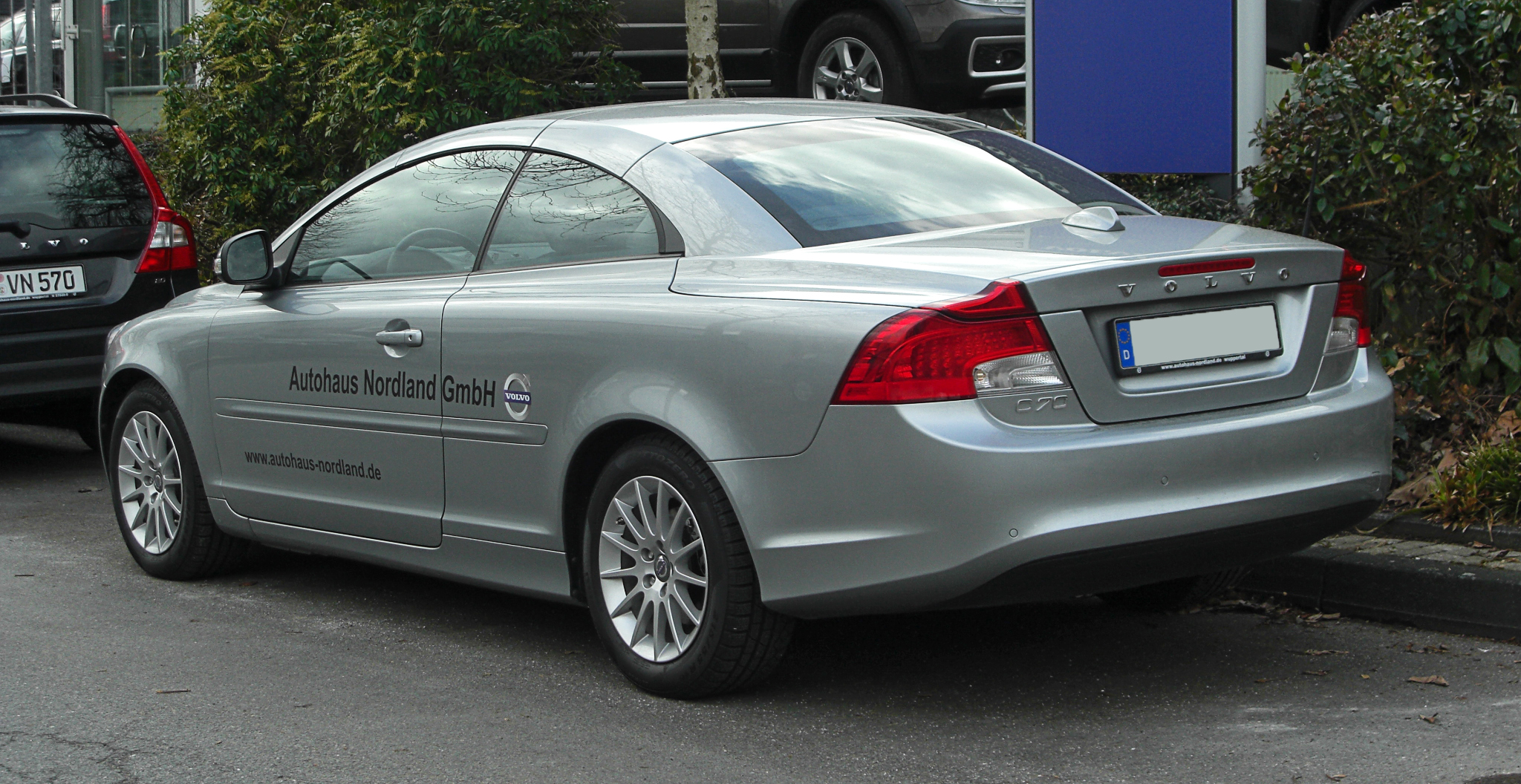
Volvo C70 convertible post facelift (DE)

==== C70 Inscription (2011–2013) ====
The C70 Inscription is a limited (2,000 units a year) version of the C70 with choice of three colours (Black Stone (Solid), Black Sapphire (Metallic) and Ice White (Solid)), 18-inch Midir wheels in black with polished spokes and outer perimeter, high-gloss paint on the grille and the LED Daytime Running Lights surrounded by contrasting chrome, an exclusive leather-covered dashboard with contrasting stitching, Sovereign Hide upholstery in Off Black or Calcite with the same contrasting stitching as on dashboard, handbrake lever and carpets; "Inscription" embroidered on the front headrests, special Inscription carpets and handbrake lever, steering wheel and gear shift knob with aluminium inlays, sports pedals with aluminium inlay, aluminium inlay in centre stack (optional Black or Nordic Light Oak)

The vehicle was unveiled at the 2011 Los Angeles Auto Show, and went on sale beginning in November 2011.

North American model went on sale in the first quarter of 2012 in limited quantities (500 units in 2012), and includes T5 engine, Active dual Xenon headlights, rear spoilers, aluminium sport pedals.

==== 2013 Volvo Special Edition C70 (2013) ====
The Volvo Special Edition C70 is a version of the 2013 Volvo C70 for the Canadian market with BLIS (Blindspot Information System), 18-inch Midir diamond-cut alloy rims, retractable side view mirrors, an integrated wind blocker, choice of 3 body colours (Ice White, Electric Silver, Ember Black), bespoke interiors swathed in Graphite Sovereign Hide, Cacao Sovereign Hide and Cranberry Leather; free option spare wheel kit containing a spare wheel Tempa Spare in trunk.

=== Engines ===
Petrol engines
Model	Engine code	Year(s)	Power at rpm	Torque at rpm	Displacement	Type
2.4	B5244S5	2005–2009	140 PS (103 kW; 138 hp) at 5000	220 N⋅m (162 lb⋅ft) at 4000	2,435 cc (148.6 in^{3})	I5
2.4i	B5244S4	2005–2009	170 PS (125 kW; 168 hp) at 6000	230 N⋅m (170 lb⋅ft) at 4400	2,435 cc (148.6 in^{3})	I5
T5	B5254T3	2005–2007	220 PS (162 kW; 217 hp) at 5000	320 N⋅m (236 lb⋅ft) at 1500–4800	2,521 cc (153.8 in^{3})	I5 turbo
T5	B5254T7	2007–2013	230 PS (169 kW; 227 hp) at 5000	320 N⋅m (236 lb⋅ft) at 1500–5000	2,521 cc (153.8 in^{3})	I5 turbo
T5 Polestar	B5254T3	2007	253 PS (186 kW; 250 hp) at 5500	370 N⋅m (273 lb⋅ft) at 3000	2,521 cc (153.8 in^{3})	I5 turbo
T5 Polestar	B5254T7	2007–2013	253 PS (186 kW; 250 hp) at 5500	370 N⋅m (273 lb⋅ft) at 3000	2,521 cc (153.8 in^{3})	I5 turbo

Diesel engines
Model	Engine code	Year(s)	Power at rpm	Torque at rpm	Displacement	Type
2.0D	D4204T	2007–2009	136 PS (100 kW; 134 hp) at 4000	320 N⋅m (236 lb⋅ft) at 2000	1,997 cc (121.9 in^{3})	I4 turbo
D5 (5AT)	D5244T8	2006–2009	180 PS (132 kW; 178 hp) at 4000	350 N⋅m (258 lb⋅ft) at 1750–3250	2,400 cc (146.5 in^{3})	I5 turbo
D5 (MT & 6AT)	D5244T13	2006–2009	180 PS (132 kW; 178 hp) at 4000	400 N⋅m (295 lb⋅ft) at 2000–2750	2,400 cc (146.5 in^{3})	I5 turbo
D3	D5204T5	2009–2013	150 PS (110 kW; 148 hp) at 3500	350 N⋅m (258 lb⋅ft) at 1500–2750	1,984 cc (121 cu in)	I5 turbo
D4	D5204T	2009–2013	177 PS (130 kW; 175 hp) at 3500	400 N⋅m (295 lb⋅ft) at 1750–2750	1,984 cc (121 cu in)	I5 turbo

=== Production ===
Production of the C70 began in Volvo's joint-venture plant with Pininfarina Sverige in Uddevalla, Sweden in 2005. On 4 October 2011 it was announced that production would cease in 2013, following the termination of the joint venture. The last C70 rolled out of the Uddevalla assembly plant on 25 June 2013.

== See also ==
- Volvo S40
- Volvo C30
- Roll over protection structure
