= Side Impact Protection System =

Volvo safety system

Side Impact Protection System (SIPS) is a passive safety system in an automobile to protect against injury in a side collision, developed by Volvo Cars. The development was driven by a need for improved protection, since side impact collisions proved to be a significant cause of serious injuries in traffic. The system was introduced in 1991 and was further developed during the 1990s century, with additions such as SIPS-bag and a side airbag to compliment to the previous side impact protection.

== History ==
SIPS was first introduced in 1991 for the Volvo 700, 900 and 850 series cars of model year 1992. It has been standard on every new Volvo since.

SIPS consists of a reinforced lower sill panel, "B pillar" and reinforcements with energy absorbing honeycomb materials inside the doors. The idea is to more widely distribute the energy in a side collision across the whole side of the car rather than having the b-pillar absorb it all. Driver and passenger seat are mounted on transverse steel rails, not bolted to the floor as per the standard configuration. In a side impact these transverse rails allow the seats to crush a reinforced center console designed to absorb additional energy.

In 1994, for the 1995 model year, the SIPS-Bag was introduced. Initially an option on 850 models, it became standard equipment of all new Volvo automobiles beginning in 1995 for the 1996 model year. The system consists of a mechanically activated side airbag that protects the front seat occupants torsos from hitting the cars interior.

In 1998, for the 1999 model year, the system was extensively redesigned. With the launch of the Volvo S80 the IC airbag, a curtain style airbag deploying from the headlining to protect the head, was added. It has since been standard equipment on all newly released Volvos.
Because of technical reasons the existing Volvo S70, V70 and C70 models were instead equipped with the SIPS-BAG II.

In 2006, for the 2007 model year, the fourth generation SIPS was introduced incorporating more high strength steel, structural changes, more bracing and dual chamber sips-bags.

Notably, under Volvo's 1999-2006 tenure with Ford's Premier Automotive Group, Ford adapted the SIPS system to numerous of its vehicles, including the Ford Five Hundred/Mercury Montego, Freestyle, Taurus X, Flex and fifth generation Explorer as well as the Lincoln MKS, MKT. Ford marketed its system as SPACE (Side Protection and Cabin Enhancement) Architecture, incorporating at floor level a bolt-in hydroformed cross-car steel beam between the B-pillars directly below an identical reinforced cross-roof beam above the B-pillars to channel impact forces around rather than through the passenger cabin.

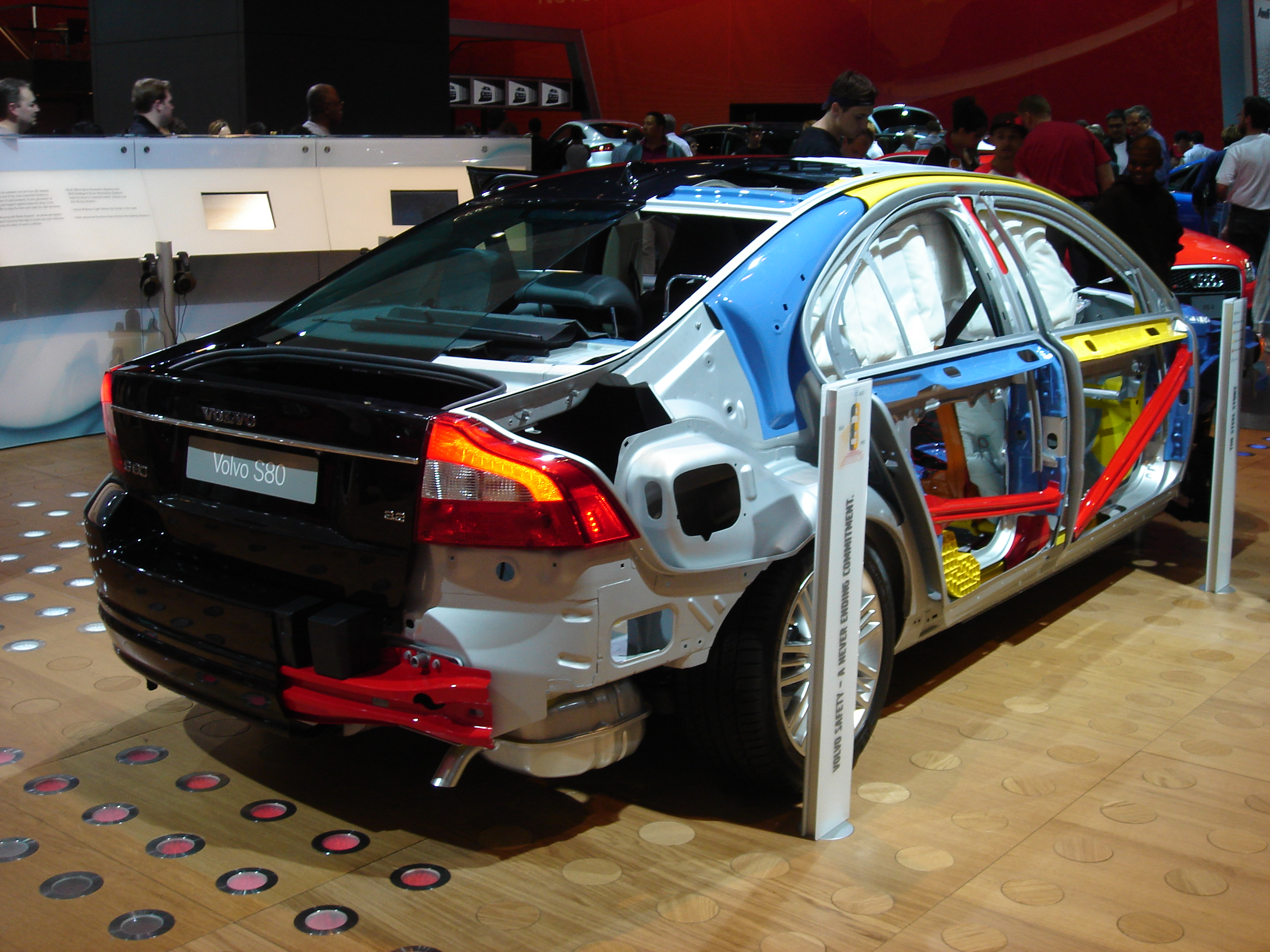
Volvo S80 cutaway showing part of the SIPS system components

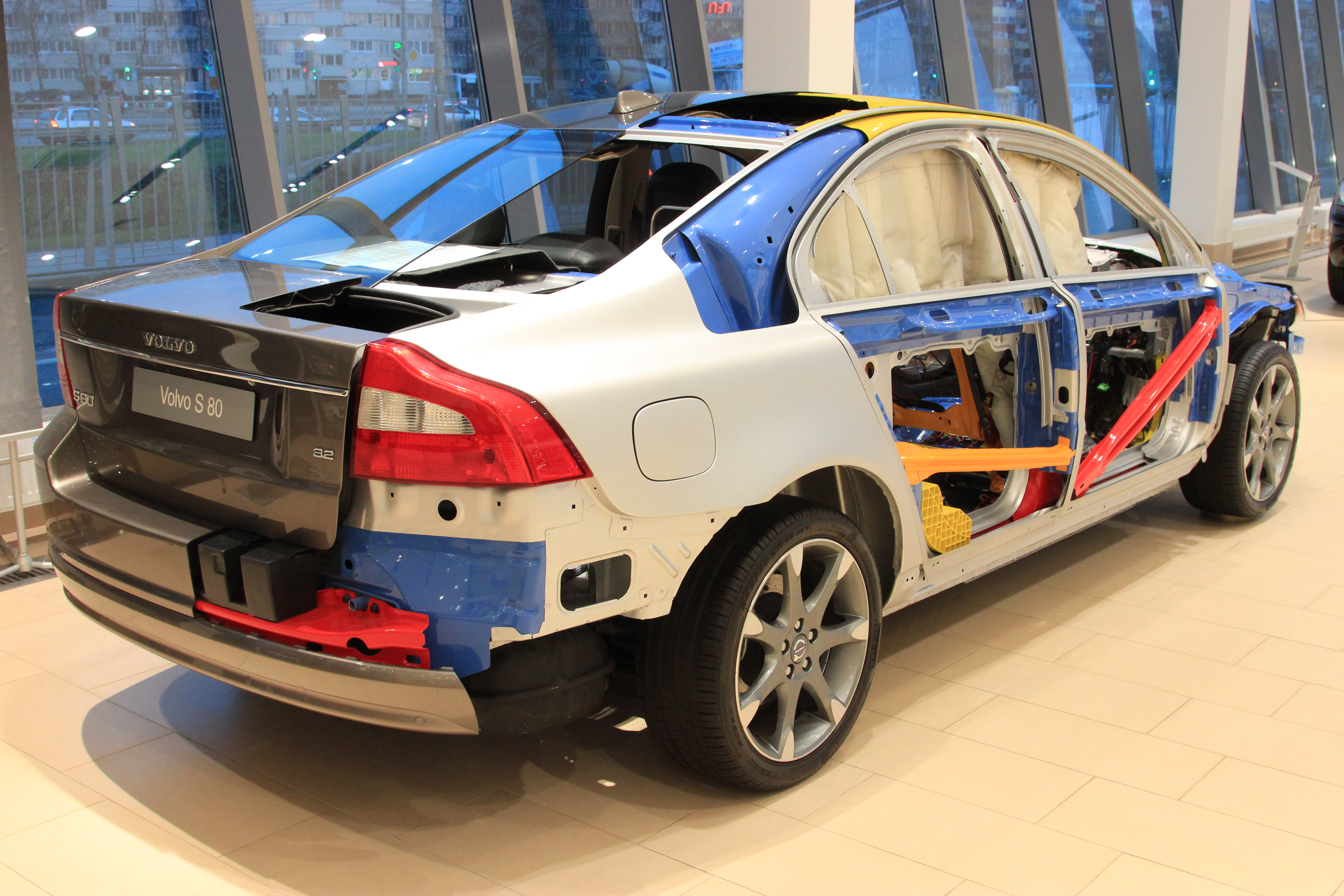
Volvo S80 cutaway showing part of the SIPS system components

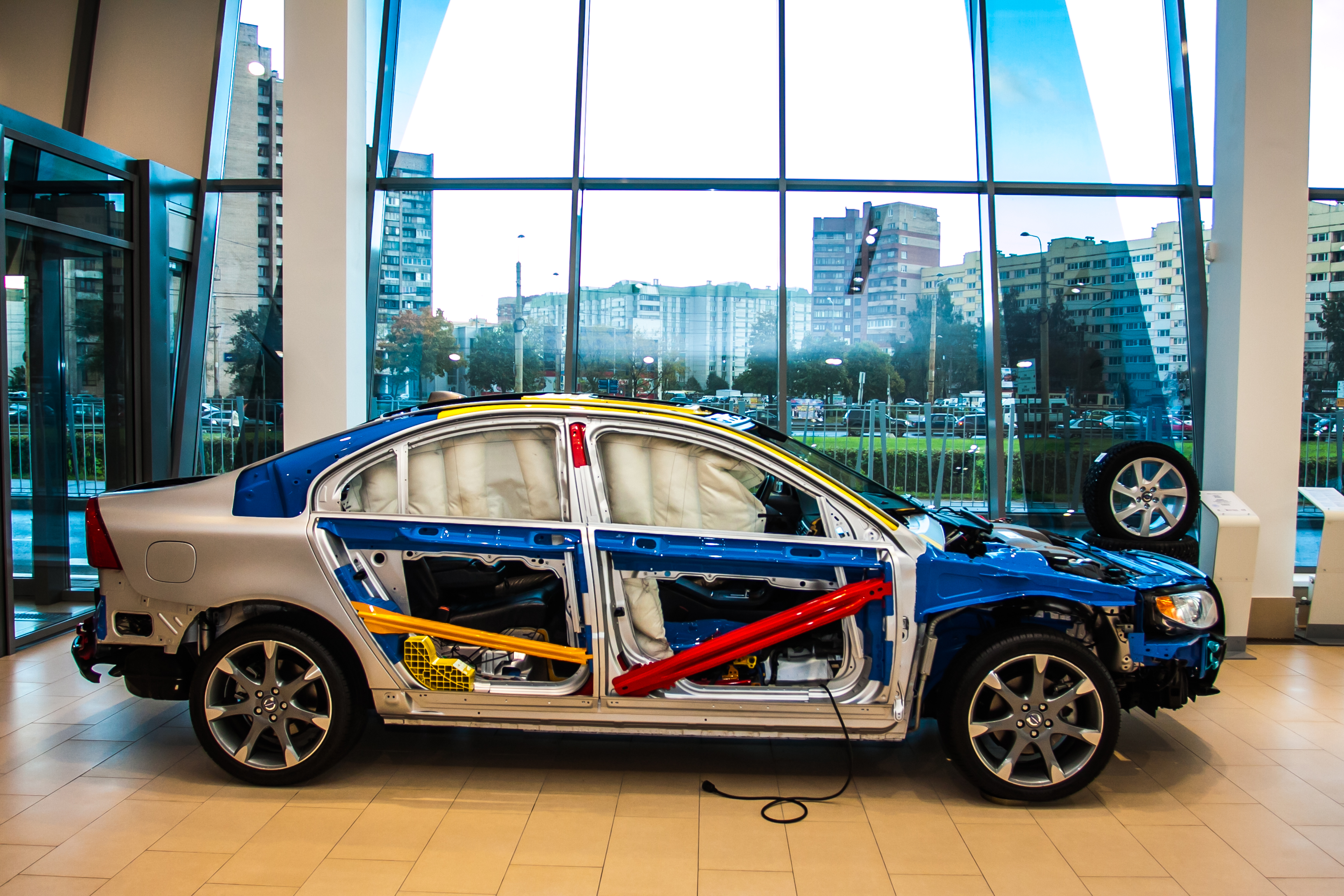
Volvo S80 cutaway showing part of the SIPS system components

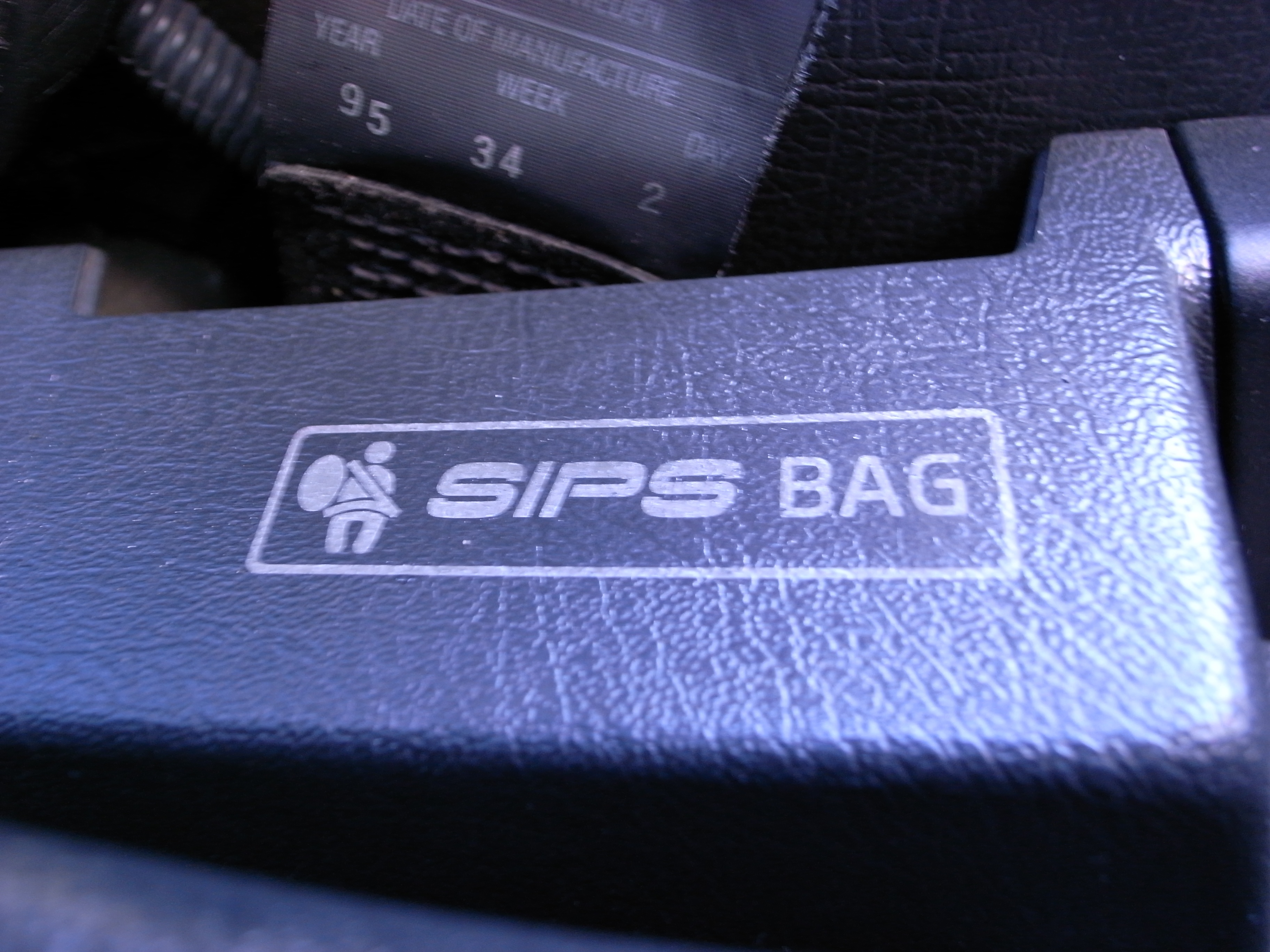
SIPS airbag

== Development of the SIPS-bag ==
In 1994 Volvo presented accident statistics, indicating that roughly 25% of the serious-to-fatal injuries in passenger cars were caused by side-impact collisions. These findings highlighted the need for improvements in side-impact protection, since the ongoing advancement of car design mainly focused on frontal crash safety.

The Volvo engineers Stig Pilhall, Johnny Korner and Bengt Ouchterlony presented the first side-collision protection airbag called SIPSbag. The solution was a supplement of the Side Impact Protection System (SIPS) and was called SIPSbag. Vehicles with SIPS and SIPSbag were estimated to reduce the risk of serious chest injuries (AIS3+) by approximately 40% in comparison with models before the innovation. Further, the objective of the SIPSbag was to, primarily, provide additional protection against chest injuries and secondarily to reduce head injuries.

The development continued to the industrialization of the SIPSbag, which was presented in a technical publication by Björn Lundell, Mikael Edvardsson, Lennart Johansson Johnny Korner and Stig Pilhall in 1995. Further, Stig Pilhall also led a team at Volvo working to integrate the airbag into the front seats allowing more extensive safety.

== Safety and effectiveness ==
Later research found that side airbag systems protecting both the head and torso addressed 41.1% lower odds for death or personal injury in side-impact collisions on the driver's side.

== See also ==
- WHIPS (Whiplash Protection System)
