= Sync box =

Device which syncs film cameras with screens to prevent roll bars

A sync box, also known as a phase adjuster in England, is a device designed to sync a film camera's shutter with TV or computer screens, otherwise thick, black roll bars appear on the video screen within the film image.

== Process ==
A lot of problems when filming TV and computer screens are based on the different frame rates involved. The standard for film projection is 24 fps. In countries like the United States that use the NTSC system for television broadcast, the frame rate is 30 fps (actually 29.97). When the camera's shutter is not in sync with the NTSC monitor, thick, dark horizontal bands or bars will appear and drift across the screen. These are called "roll bars". A sync box with phase control is used to eliminate the roll bars.

Shooting at 24 fps with a 144° camera shutter will reduce the size of the roll bars to very thin lines. At this shutter angle, using a sync box with the camera can stop the thin roll bars from moving. Phase control allows the camera operator to place the thin roll bars at any point in the frame. The choice of placement generally comes down to two options: Having two lines, one at the top third and one at the bottom third of the display, or only one line right across the center.

== Solutions without sync boxes ==
In certain cases, filmmakers found ways of filming television screens without the use of sync boxes. Documented examples include:

- Mark Irwin, director of photography on Videodrome (1983), did not have access to a sync box during that film for shooting many scenes involving TV screens. He used a camera with a fixed shutter speed to reduce roll bars to very thin lines in that film, thus making them imperceptible. (Note: While Irwin doesn't mention it in the commentary, the fixed shutter angle is most likely 144° due to Irwin's description of the thin roll bars in the commentary and Malkiewicz and Mullen's description in Cinematography: Third Edition.)
- One of the technical innovations introduced in Star Trek II: The Wrath of Khan was the use of 24-frame video playback though specially designed TV sets and videotape players. This allows for the filming of video screens without black bars or flickering, thus negating the need for a sync box. The system was designed by Hal Landaker at The Burbank Studios.
