= Roll cage =

Vehicle frame designed to protect occupants in the event of a crash

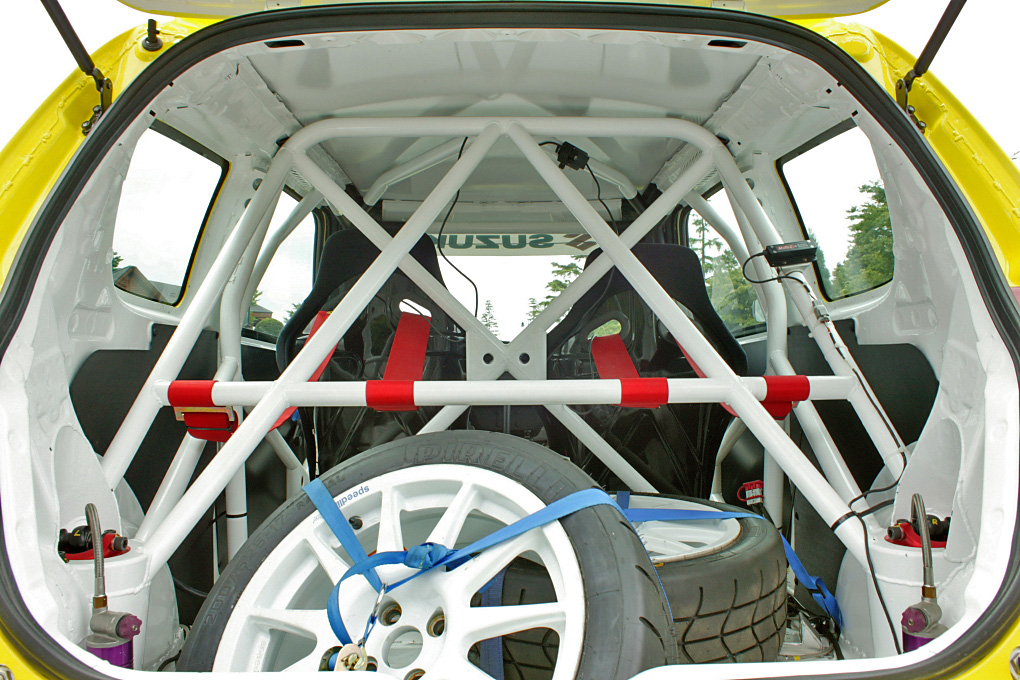
Racecar roll cage inside a Suzuki Swift

A roll cage is a specially engineered and constructed frame built in (or sometimes around, in which case it is known as an exo cage) the passenger compartment of a vehicle to protect its occupants from being injured or killed in an accident, particularly in the event of a rollover.

== Designs ==
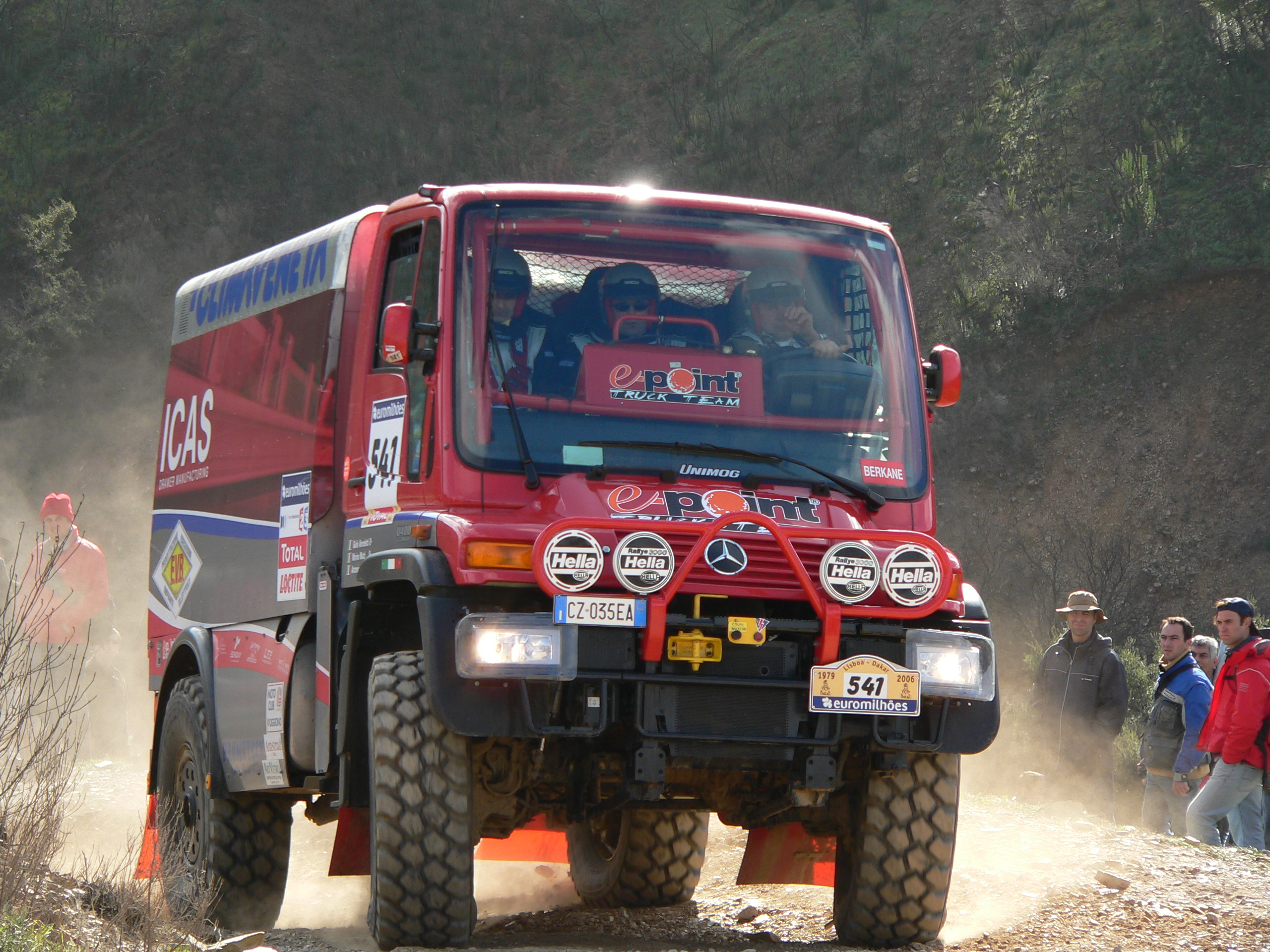
Unimog with integrated roll cage at the 2006 Dakar Rally

There are many different roll cage designs depending on the application. Hence, various racing organizations have differing specifications and regulations, although most of these organizations harmonize their rules with those of the FIA.

Roll cages help to stiffen the chassis, which is desirable in racing applications. Racing cages are typically either bolt-in or welded-in, with the former being more straightforward and cheaper to fit while the latter is stronger and more substantial.

A roll bar is a single bar behind the driver that provides moderate rollover protection. Due to the lack of a protective top, some modern convertibles utilize a strong windscreen frame acting as a roll bar. Also, a roll hoop may be placed behind both headrests (usually one on older cars), which is essentially a roll bar spanning the width of a passenger's shoulders.

== Road cars ==
A newer form of rollover protection, pioneered on the Mercedes-Benz R129 in 1989, is deployable roll hoops that are usually hidden within the body of a car. When sensors detect an imminent rollover, the roll hoops quickly extend and lock in place. Cars that have a deployable rollover protection system include the Peugeot 307 CC, Volvo C70, Mercedes-Benz SL 500, Jaguar XK, and the Lamborghini Reventón Roadster.

== Other applications ==
Roll bars are also used historically on row crop tractors, and roll cages are incorporated as part of the cab on modern tractors.

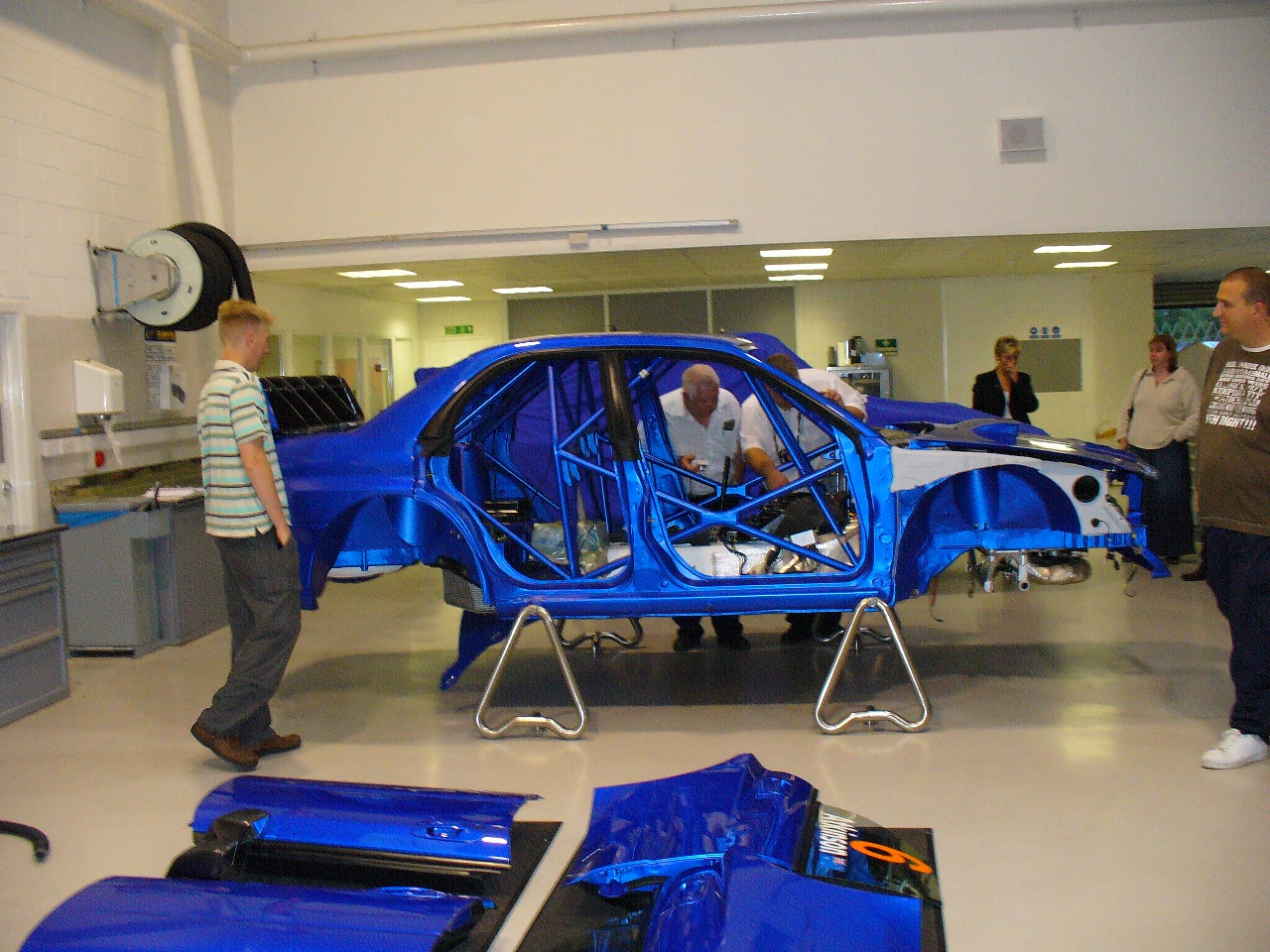
A 2006 Subaru Impreza WRC bodyshell with integrated roll cage

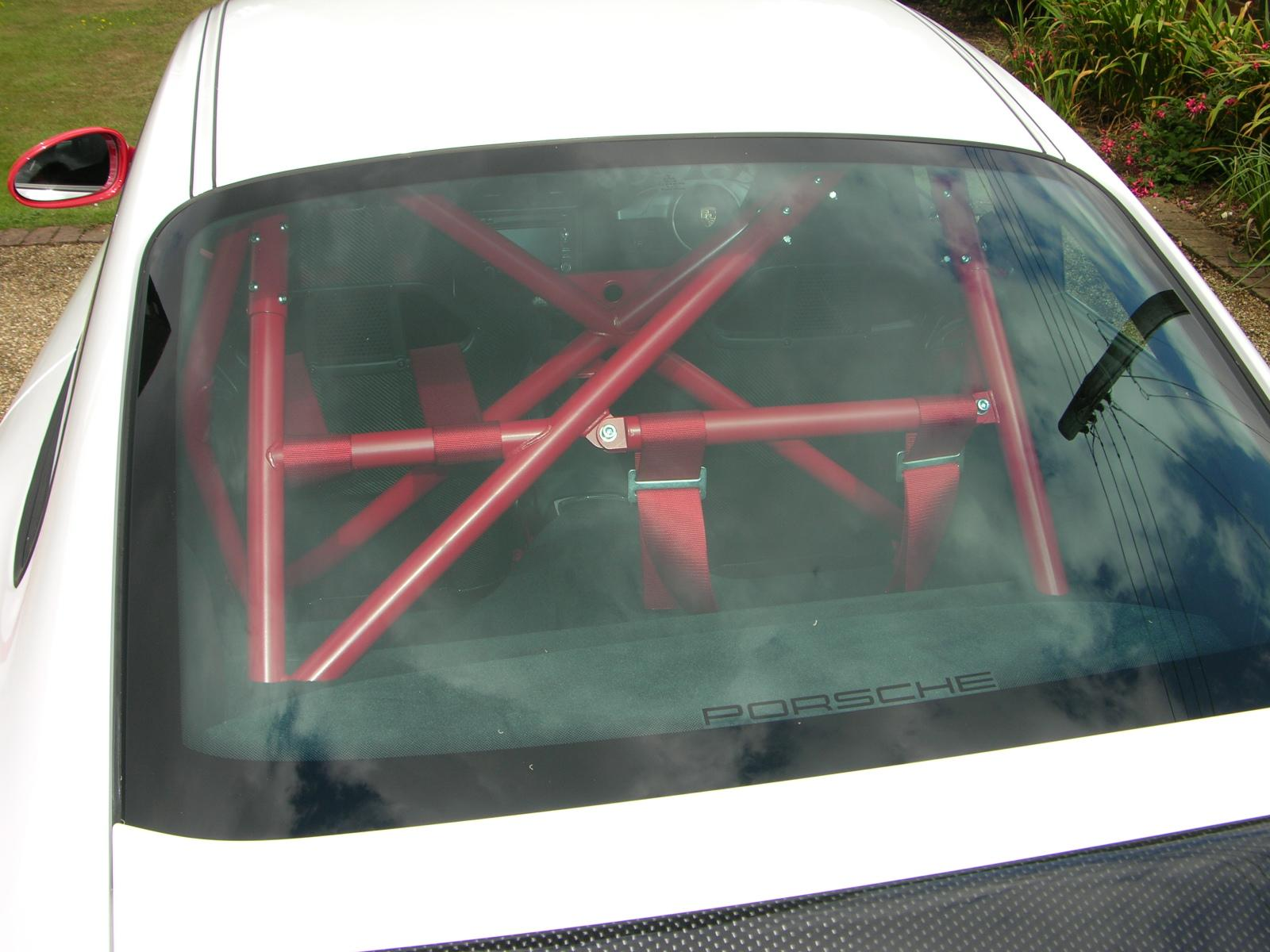
Roll cage in a Porsche 997 GT3 RS.

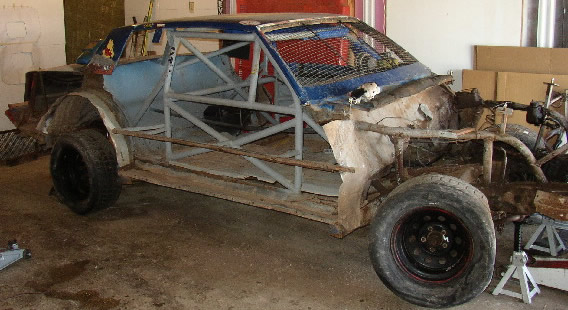
A race car stripped down to its roll cage and firewalls

== See also ==
- Active rollover protection
- List of auto parts
- Rollover protection structure
- Space frame in vehicles
- Exoskeleton car
