= WHIPS =

Vehicle safety system by Volvo

Whiplash Protection System (WHIPS) is a system to protect against automotive whiplash injuries introduced by Volvo in 1998. It was launched when the Volvo S80 was released for the 1999 model year and has since been part of the standard equipment of all new Volvo cars.

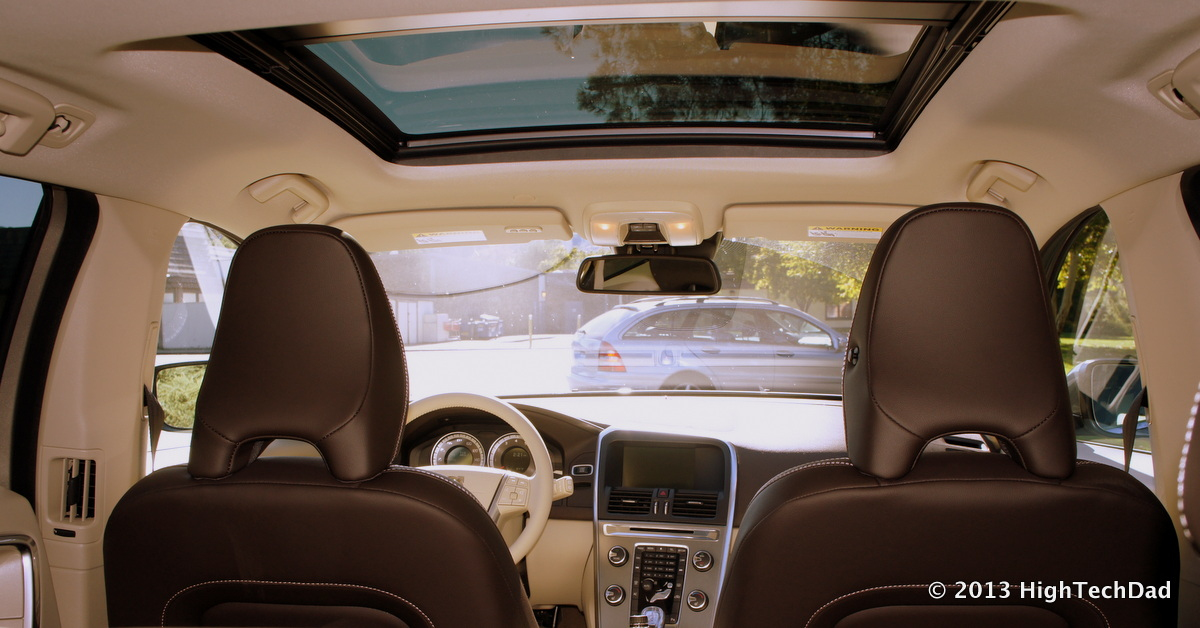
WHIPS head restraints in XC60

== Details ==
A WHIPS equipped seat is designed so that the entire backrest helps to protect the front occupant's neck in a case of a rear impact. When the system is deployed, the front seat backrests and headrests are lowered backward to change the seating position of the driver and front seat passenger. The main energy is absorbed via a pivot at the base of the seat–mechanism which allows the seat to move around the occupant's actual hip joint while moving rearward to absorb additional energy. A piece of metal inside the backrest hinge deforms, absorbing more energy. The hinge piece needs to be replaced after having been deployed.

According to Volvo's traffic accident research team, the WHIPS equipped seat resulted in a 33% reduction in short term injury and a 54% reduction in long term whiplash injuries caused by car accidents.

== Context ==
Similar front seat technology is now found in many Asian, European, and American vehicles. The Insurance Institute for Highway Safety (IIHS) rates head restraint and seat designs and the 2009 Euro NCAP 5 star safety testing now includes whiplash protection as part of the testing program. Saab Automobile AB was first with introducing active head restraints in 1997.

== See also ==
- Side Impact Protection System
- Saab Active Head Restraint (SAHR)
