= Géza Lóczi =

American automobile designer

Géza Lóczi is a Hungarian American car designer, Director of Design at Volvo Monitoring Concept Center (VMCC in Camarillo, California).
He started drawing cars at the age of nine. When he was twelve, he carved cars out of wood and started painting them. He entered the Fisher Body Craftsman's Guild, a model car competition sponsored by General Motors. After building seven models in seven years for the competition, Lóczi learned a lot about designing, proportion, painting, craftsmanship and managing projects. These 1/12 scale models won him a scholarship to the Art Center College of Design in Pasadena, California, where he studied Transportation and Product Design. In 1965, he won the top national award, a $5,000 scholarship. FBCG final year of competition was 1968.

In 1980, Lóczi became a design manager at Volkswagen. After that Lóczi established his own consulting design company. In 1983 Lóczi worked as a consultant to Volvo in California, then moved to Sweden to work with the company. He moved back to California in 1985. A year later when Volvo started a studio in California, he became the Chief Designer.

He has been involved in the design of the Environmental Concept Car (ECC), P2 cars in production today (S80, V70 and S60), the Safety Concept Car (SCC) shown at the Detroit Motor Show. VMCC, the Volvo Cars think-tank also designed the XC90, Volvo's entry into the North American SUV market.

Lóczi taught Transportation Design at the Art Center College from 1986 to 1996.
