= Volvo S60 =

Swedish compact executive sedan

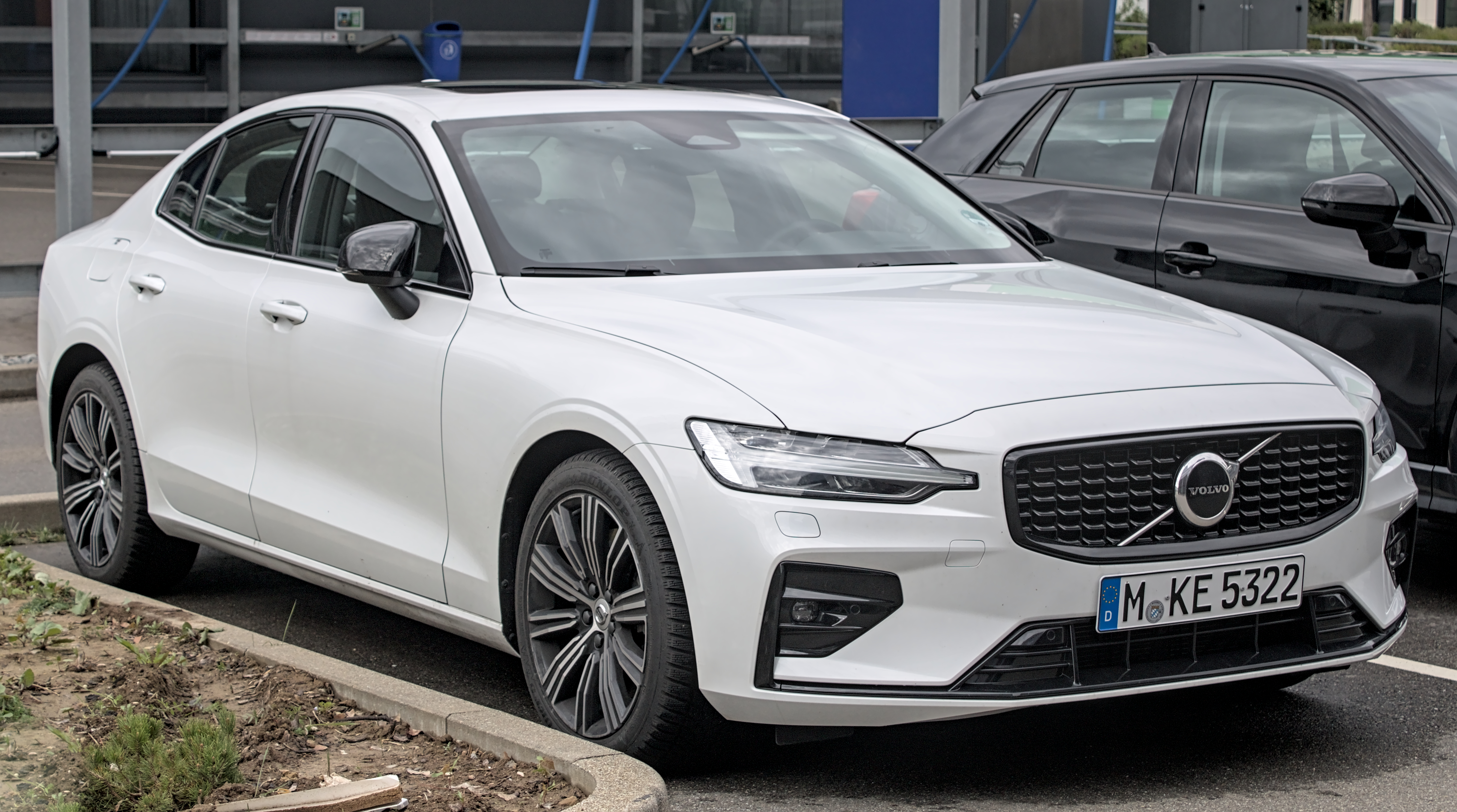

Overview
- Manufacturer: Volvo Cars
- Production: 2000–2024; 2013–present (China)
- Model years: 2001–2025 (North America and Europe); 2001–present (China and select Asia-Pacific countries)

Body and chassis
- Class: Compact executive car (D)
- Body style: 4-door saloon
- Layout: Front-engine, front-wheel-drive Front-engine, four-wheel-drive
- Related: Volvo V60; Volvo XC60

Chronology
- Predecessor: Volvo S70

The Volvo S60 is a compact executive car manufactured and marketed by Volvo Cars since 2000. Introduced as the successor to the Volvo S70, the model has been produced in three generations.

The first generation was introduced in 2000 and is based on the Volvo P2 platform. Its estate counterpart is the Volvo V70. A high-performance variant, the S60 R, was introduced in 2002.

The second generation was introduced in 2010; its estate counterpart is the Volvo V60.

The third generation was introduced in 2018 on Volvo's Scalable Product Architecture platform. It became the first Volvo model produced in the United States, at the company's plant in Ridgeville, South Carolina. The United States briefly became the sole global source of the S60 sedan after production in China was temporarily halted in early 2019. Production for North America and Europe ended in 2024, while production in China continued for the Chinese and select Asia-Pacific markets.

== First generation (2000) ==
Volvo S60 (first generation)
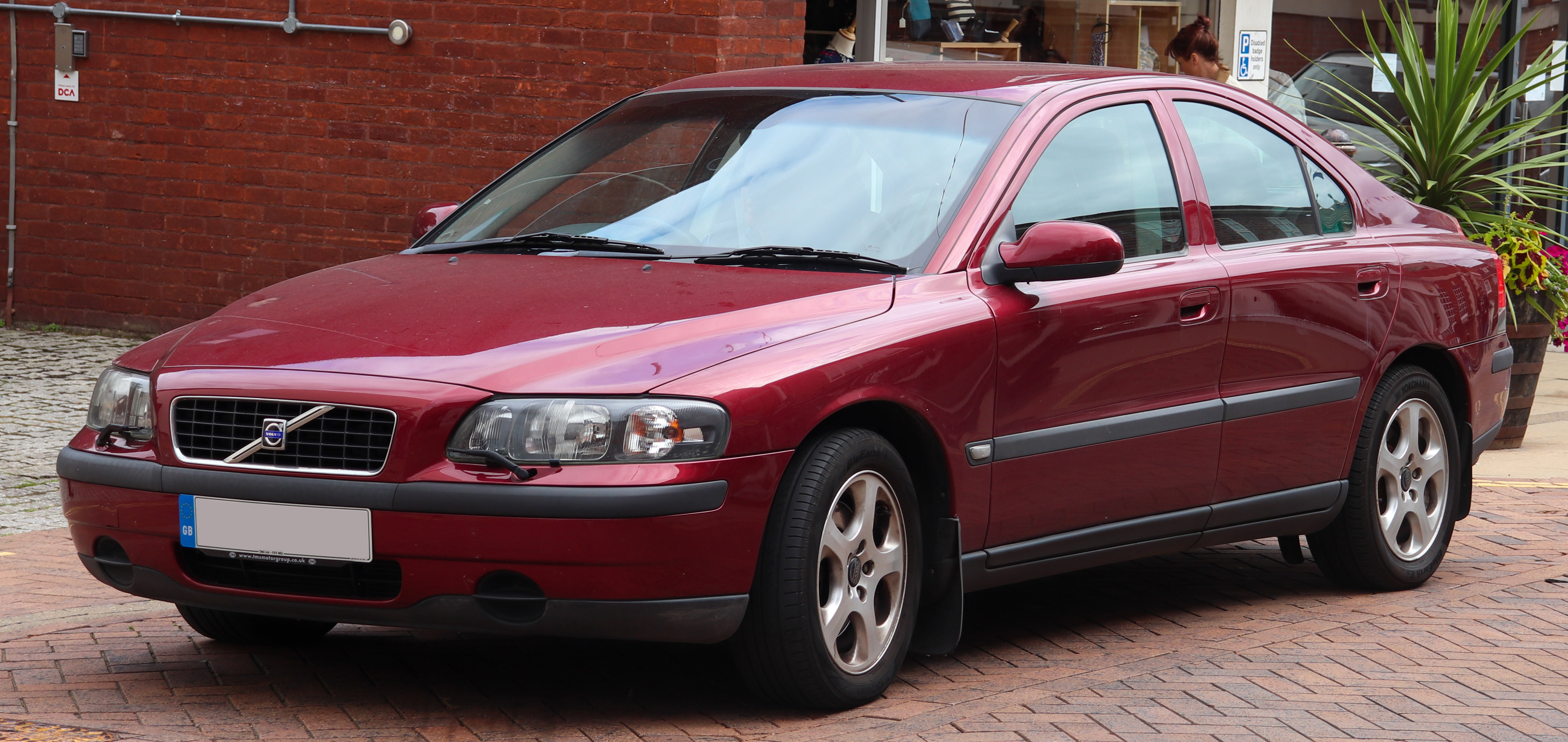

Overview
- Production: 2000–2009
- Model years: 2001–2010
- Assembly: Sweden: Torslanda (Torslandaverken); Belgium: Ghent (VCG); Malaysia: Shah Alam (SMA)
- Designer: Géza Lóczi (1997)

Body and chassis
- Class: Compact executive car
- Layout: Front-engine, front-wheel-drive Front-engine, four-wheel-drive
- Platform: Volvo P2 platform
- Related: Volvo V70 II; Volvo S80; Volvo XC90

Powertrain
- Engine: petrol: 1,984 cc (2.0 L) B5204T5 turbo I5; 2,319 cc (2.3 L) B5234T3 turbo I5; 2,435 cc (2.4 L) B5244S/S2 I5; 2,435 cc (2.4 L) B5244SG I5 (petrol / LPG / CNG); 2,435 cc (2.4 L) B5244T/T3/T5 turbo I5; 2,521 cc (2.5 L) B5254T2/T2-R turbo I5; diesel: 2,401 cc (2.4 L) D5244T turbodiesel I5
- Transmission: 5-speed Volvo M56 manual; 5-speed Volvo M58 manual; 6-speed Volvo M66 manual; 5-speed Aisin AW55-50/51SN automatic; 6-speed Aisin TF-80SC automatic

Dimensions
- Wheelbase: 2,713 mm (106.8 in) (2001–2002); 2,715 mm (106.9 in) (2003–2009)
- Length: 4,581 mm (180.4 in) (2001–2005); 4,602 mm (181.2 in) (2006–2009); 4,605 mm (181.3 in) (2003–2005, S60 R); 4,638 mm (182.6 in) (2006–2009, S60 R)
- Width: 1,813 mm (71.4 in) (2001–2005); 1,823 mm (71.8 in) (2006–2009)
- Height: 1,433 mm (56.4 in); 1,397 mm (55.0 in) (2003–2005, S60 R); 1,436 mm (56.5 in) (2006–2007, S60 R)
- Curb weight: 1,475–1,700 kg (3,252–3,748 lb)

The S60 was built on Volvo's P2 platform, which was shared with other Volvo models like the S80, V70, XC70 and finally the XC90. The design of the S60 drew styling cues from the Volvo ECC concept car and the Volvo S80.

The Volvo S60 was released in 2000 (2001 model year) being the company's new generation sports sedan. The S60 is aimed to mainly compete in Europe with the BMW 3 Series (E46), the Mercedes-Benz C-Class (W203) and the Alfa Romeo 156. Unlike its rivals, the Volvo S60 continued production for 9 years with multiple facelifts. When it was introduced the appearance was unlike the squared vehicles offered in previous years, and continued the new design tradition introduced by the larger S80, utilizing a cab forward approach and was more organic appearing with a pronounced shelf along the beltline that ran the length of the vehicle, achieving a Cd=0.28 drag coefficient. Volvo continued its safety tradition, offering front and rear integrated crumple zones, driver and front passenger dual threshold airbags with a collapsible three-stage steering column, Side Impact Protection System (SIPS) supplemented with air bags for driver and front passenger, along with a side curtain airbag for front and rear passengers, anti-submarine seats, five padded head restraints with Whiplash Protection System (WHIPS), and automatic seat belt pretensioners while front belts also have height adjustment.

In 2004 PremAir™ was introduced as a standard feature to the exterior radiator surface which converts up to 75 percent of ground level ozone in the radiator cooling air into oxygen, while the Interior Air Quality System cleans the air inside, detects for pollutants and automatically recirculates in comparison to the air outside. The upholstery was available in taupe, light sand or graphite with indigo inserts and the leathers were tanned using natural plant materials. The S60 sheet metal content can be recycled, along with other metals that achieved an 85 overall percentage. Dual zone climate control and heated front seats along with a three position drivers memory setting were optional, and anti-smash and grab laminated side windows were available. Two 17 in (431.8 mm), three 16 in (406.4 mm) and one 15 in (381.0 mm) aluminum alloy wheel choices were available.

The S60 came standard with Volvo's own radio unit, the HU-613, the HU-803 and was later upgraded to the HU-650 and an optional extra HU-850 unit. The HU-850 unit features a 225 or 335-watt power output (depending on optional external amplifier) with three presets: 2CH, 3CH and Dolby Digital Pro Logic II Surround Sound. The Four-C chassis from the S60 R became an option on some S60s.

In 2004 the T5 engine was reengineered from 2.3 to 2.4 liters, installing continuously variable valve timing and achieving an increase of 10 hp (7 kW), while the 2.5 liter engine was given a Ultra-low-emission vehicle (ULEV) certification, and a modified turbo in the D5 model also increased the maximum claimed power from 163 PS to 185 PS, while electronic brakeforce distribution was installed for emergency braking situations. The Haldex-sourced computer controlled AWD system, which was standard equipment in the S60R, was optionally available mated to the 2.5 liter engine. Three transmissions were offered, the Geartronic automatic which offered five speeds that adapts to driving style or the "Auto-Stick" offers a manual mode that offered the ability to select gears by moving the gearstick forward or back. The second automatic five speed transmission was available without the manual mode feature. A more traditional manual five speed transmission was the third selection offered.

The S60 was refreshed in 2005. The exterior was updated with body-colored side moldings and bumpers with chrome linings, as well as new headlamps replacing the original with black housing, with optional HID headlights. The interior received some updates as well, with new seats, trim, and an updated center console. The S60 went through a final facelift in 2008 with full body-colored bumper and door inserts and larger emblem in the front and larger spaced out "V-O-L-V-O" letters in the rear. The interior featured a new pattern upholstery which differs from its original pattern.

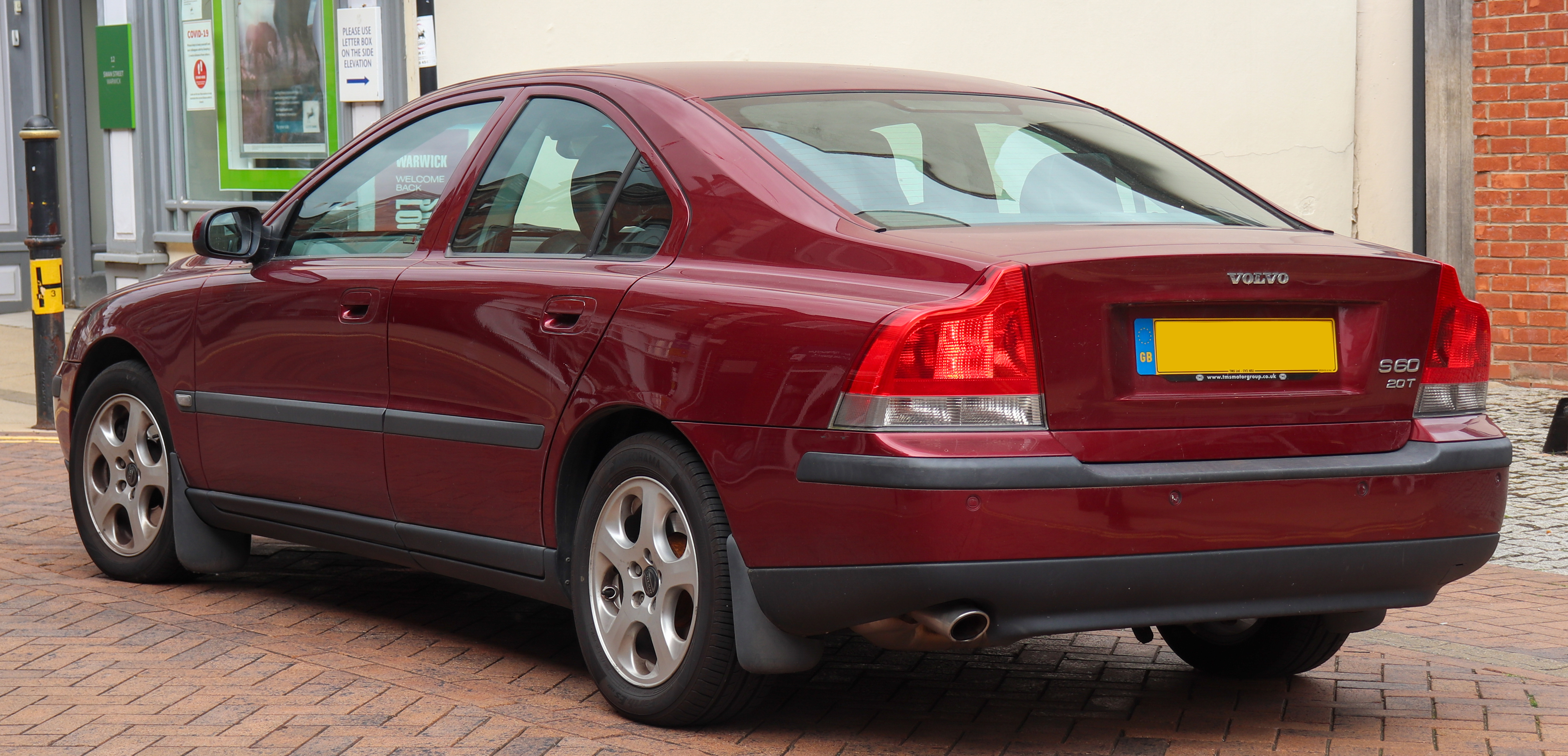
Pre-facelift Volvo S60 (UK)

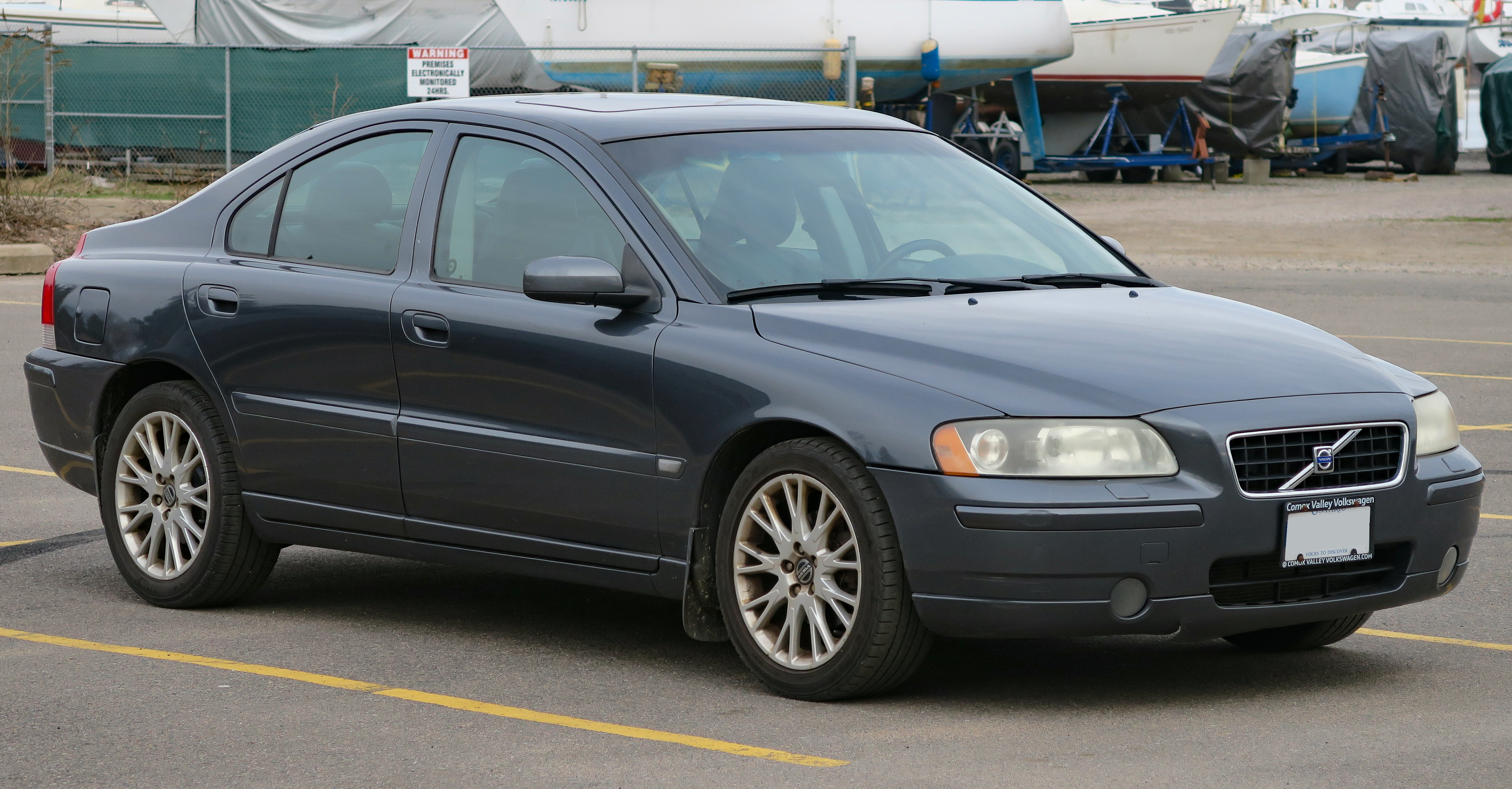
Facelift Volvo S60 (Canada)

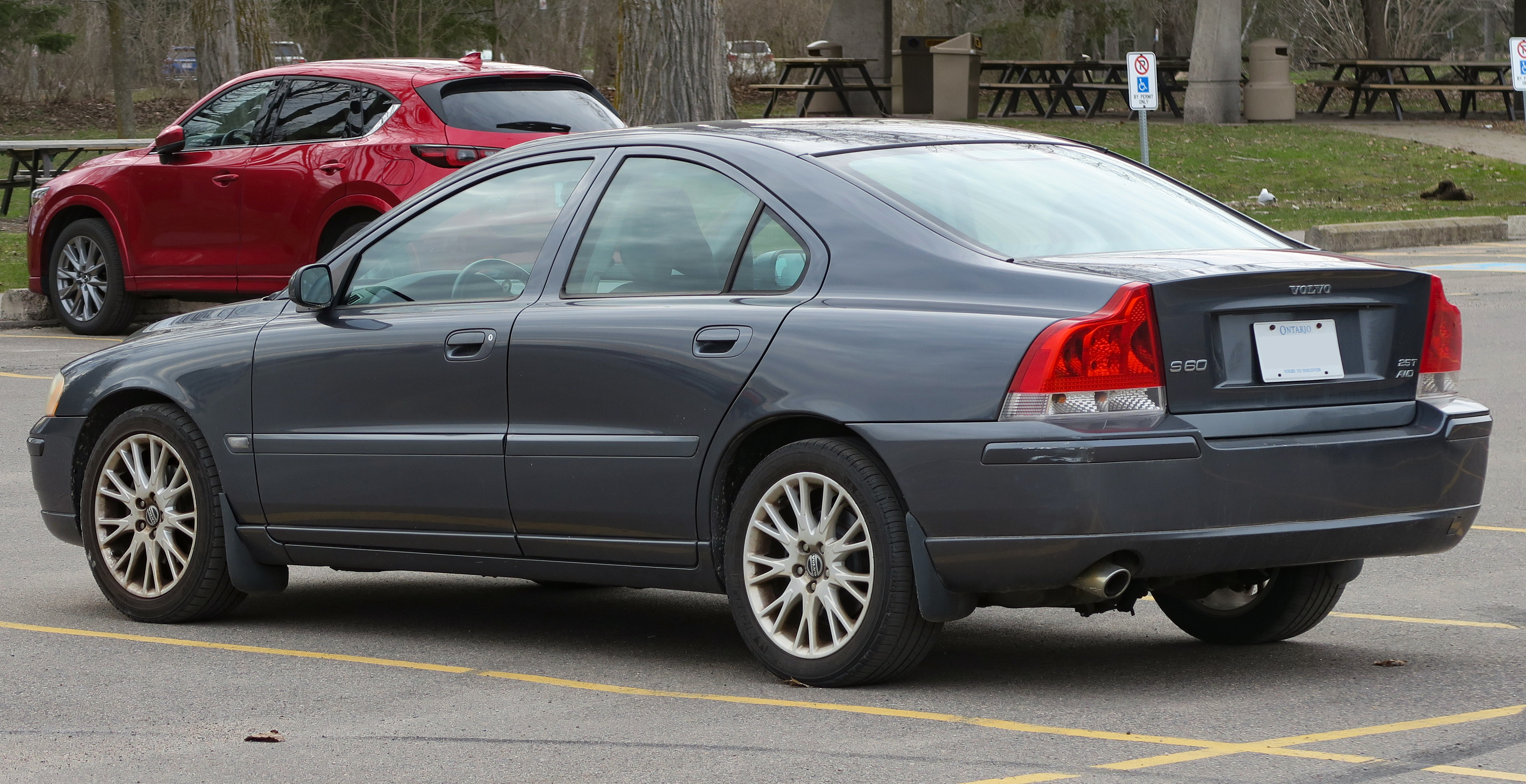
Facelift Volvo S60 (Canada)

=== First-generation models ===
==== S60 R ====
First introduced in 2004, Volvo's S60 R used a Haldex computer controlled all-wheel-drive system mated to a 300 PS (221 kW; 296 hp) / 400 N⋅m (300 lbf⋅ft) inline-5 which sends 95 percent of the torque to the front wheels under normal driving conditions and can send up to 30 percent to the rear wheels as necessary. The 2004–2005 models came with a 6-speed manual transmission, or an available 5-speed automatic which allowed only 258 lb⋅ft (350 N⋅m) torque in 1st and 2nd gears. The 2006–2007 models came with a 6-speed manual or 6-speed automatic transmission (which was no longer torque-restricted).

Other aspects which set the R apart from standard S60s were the large Brembo front and rear four-piston brakes, 18-inch 5-spoke "Pegasus" wheels (available as an upgrade to the standard 17-inch wheels of the same design), blue faced "R" gauges, standard HID headlights, as well as the Four-C suspension system.

Semi-active suspension with Four-C (a short name for "Continuously Controlled Chassis Concept") allows the user to select from three modes: Comfort, Sport, and Advanced. "Comfort" attempts to soften the car over bumps, while "Advanced" firms the suspension considerably and gives more aggressive throttle response - a setting Volvo implies is for use on the race track. This is accomplished through a drive by wire throttle, allowing the same pedal travel to result in different performance when the appropriate mode is selected, electronically controlled shock absorbers that can adjust themselves 500 times a second, and a complex series of sensors throughout the body of the vehicle. Volvo collaborated with high-tech system developer Ohlins Racing AB and shock absorber manufacturer Monroe for the self-adjusting shock absorbers.

The R had three themed interior color options with upholstery in soft leather supplied by Bridge of Weir, and they were Nordkapp (dark blue) or Gobi (light tan). A third choice was offered as a natural leather option, Atacama (dark orange), available for an additional charge. The natural leather choice was said to have the thickness and feel of a baseball glove.

The small trunk lid spoiler that was standard on the S60 R created a 20% increased downforce at the rear wheels at high speeds compared to the standard S60s. The S60 Rs have a 0.29 Drag coefficient, compared to the standard S60's 0.28, due to the larger lower front bumper spoiler to support the secondary intercooler.

Another Volvo factory option for only the S60 R was a body kit which included front bumper splitters, side skirts and a rear valance, color matched to the body. The body kit was only available with certain body colors and in certain markets.

The S60 R continued the tradition of "R" cars for Volvo beginning in 1995 with the introduction of the 850 T-5 R.

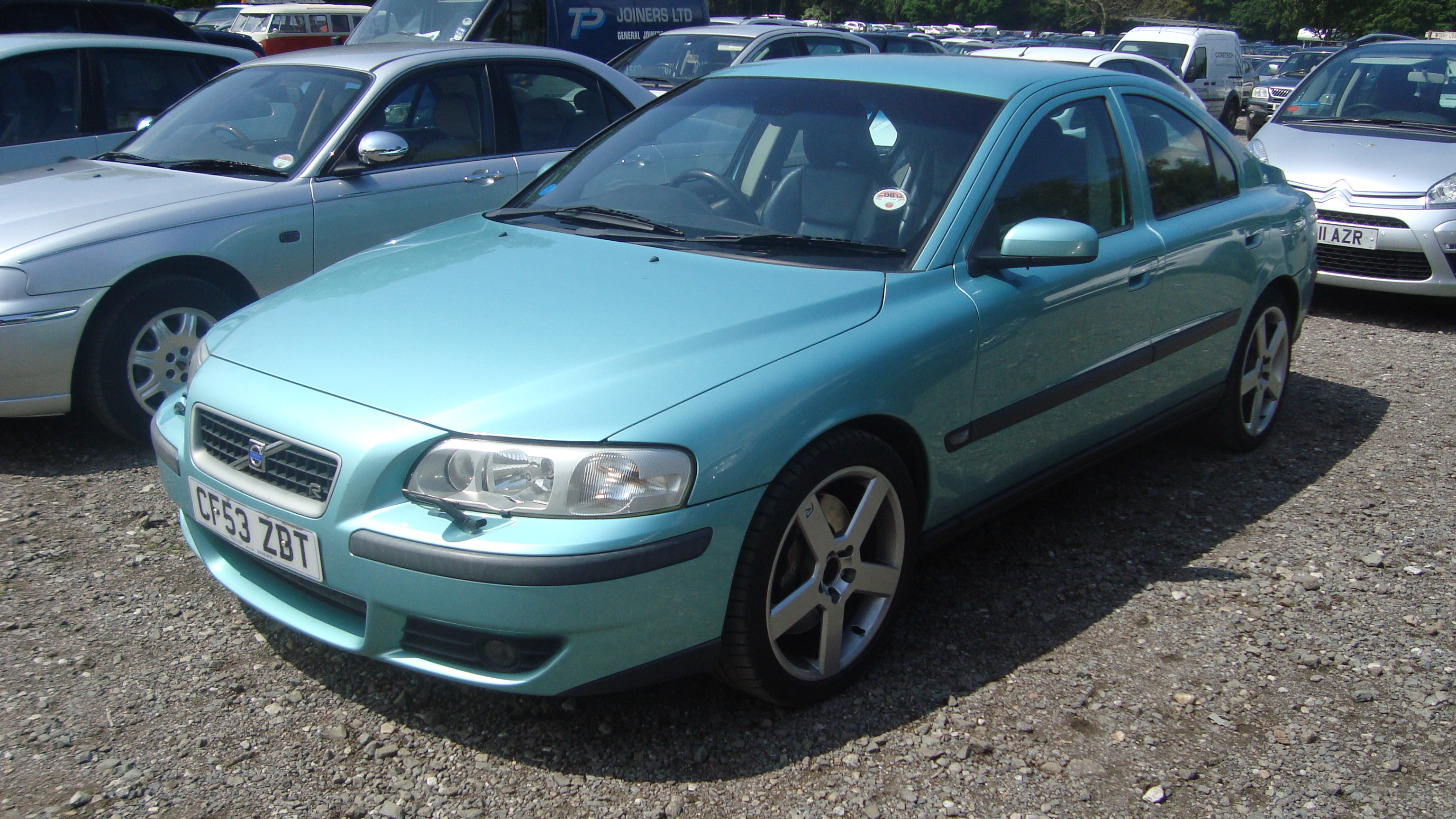
Volvo S60 R AWD pre-facelift in Flash Green (UK)

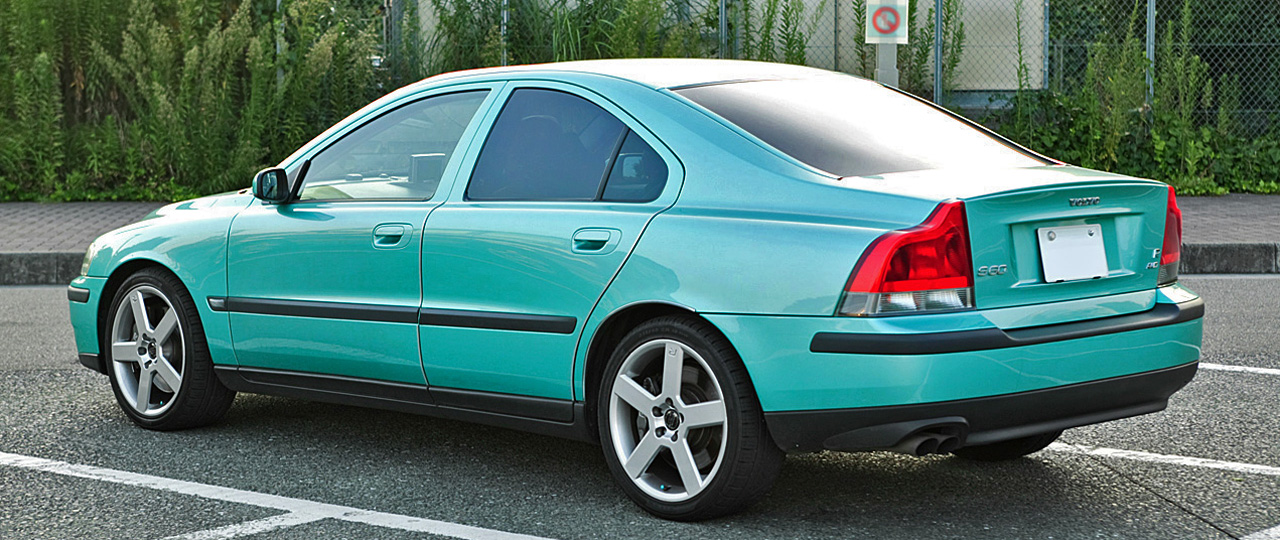
Volvo S60 R AWD pre-facelift in Flash Green (Japan)

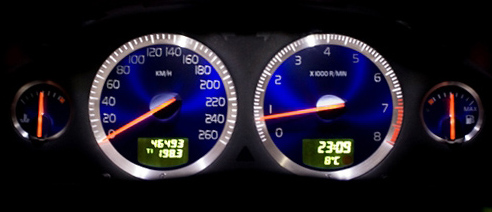
Blue faced gauges

=== Engines ===
Petrol engines
Model	Engine code	Year(s)	Power at rpm	Torque at rpm	Displacement	Comment
2.4	B5244S2	2001–2009	140 PS (103 kW; 138 hp) at 4500	220 N⋅m (162 lb⋅ft) at 3300	2,435 cc (148.6 in^{3})	Inline 5
2.4	B5244S	2001–2009	170 PS (125 kW; 168 hp) at 6000	230 N⋅m (170 lb⋅ft) at 4500	2,435 cc (148.6 in^{3})	Inline 5
2.0T	B5204T	2001–2003	163 PS (120 kW; 161 hp)	240 N⋅m (177 lb⋅ft) at 2200–4800	1,984 cc (121.1 in^{3})	Inline 5 with turbo
2.0T	B5204T5	2001–2009	180 PS (132 kW; 178 hp) at 5500	240 N⋅m (177 lb⋅ft) at 1850–5000	1,984 cc (121.1 in^{3})	Inline 5 with turbo
2.4T; 2.4T AWD	B5244T3	2001–2003	200 PS (147 kW; 197 hp)	285 N⋅m (210 lb⋅ft) at 1800–5000	2,435 cc (148.6 in^{3})	Inline 5 with turbo
2.5T; 2.5T AWD	B5254T2	2003–2009	210 PS (154 kW; 207 hp) at 5000	320 N⋅m (236 lb⋅ft) at 1500–4500	2,521 cc (153.8 in^{3})	Inline 5 with turbo
T5 2.3	B5234T3	2001–2004	250 PS (184 kW; 247 hp)	330 N⋅m (243 lb⋅ft) at 2400–5200	2,319 cc (141.5 in^{3})	Inline 5 with turbo
T5 2.4	B5244T5	2005–2009	260 PS (191 kW; 256 hp) at 5500	350 N⋅m (258 lb⋅ft) at 2100–5000	2,401 cc (146.5 in^{3})	Inline 5 with turbo
R 6-speed manual	B5254T4	2004–2007	300 PS (221 kW; 296 hp) at 5400	400 N⋅m (295 lb⋅ft) at 1850–5700	2,521 cc (153.8 in^{3})	Inline 5 with turbo
R 5-speed auto	B5254T4	2004–2005	300 PS (221 kW; 296 hp)	350 N⋅m (258 lb⋅ft) at 1800–6000	2,521 cc (153.8 in^{3})	Inline 5 with turbo
R 6-speed auto	B5254T4	2006–2007	300 PS (221 kW; 296 hp)	400 N⋅m (295 lb⋅ft) at 1950–5250	2,521 cc (153.8 in^{3})	Inline 5 with turbo

Diesel engines
Model	Engine code	Year(s)	Power	Torque at rpm	Displacement	Comment
2.4D	D5244T2	2002–2006	130 PS (96 kW; 128 hp)	280 N⋅m (207 lb⋅ft) at 1750–3000	2,401 cc (146.5 in^{3})	Inline 5 with turbo
D5	D5244T	2001–2004	163 PS (120 kW; 161 hp)	340 N⋅m (251 lb⋅ft) at 1750–2750	2,401 cc (146.5 in^{3})	Inline 5 with turbo
D	D5244T7	2006–2009	126 PS (93 kW; 124 hp)	300 N⋅m (221 lb⋅ft) at 1750–2250	2,400 cc (146.5 in^{3})	Inline 5 with turbo
2.4D	D5244T5	2005–2009	163 PS (120 kW; 161 hp)	340 N⋅m (251 lb⋅ft) at 1750–2750	2,400 cc (146.5 in^{3})	Inline 5 with turbo
D5	D5244T4	2004–2009	185 PS (136 kW; 182 hp)	400 N⋅m (295 lb⋅ft) at 2000–2750	2,400 cc (146.5 in^{3})	Inline 5 with turbo

Gas
Model	Engine code	Year(s)	Power at rpm	Torque at rpm	Displacement	Comment
2.4 Bi-Fuel CNG	B5244SG	2002–2008	140 PS (103 kW; 138 hp) at 5800	192 N⋅m (142 lb⋅ft) at 4500	2,435 cc (148.6 in^{3})	CNG/petrol
2.4 Bi-Fuel LPG	B5244SG2	2002–2005	140 PS (103 kW; 138 hp) at 5100	214 N⋅m (158 lb⋅ft) at 4500	2,435 cc (148.6 in^{3})	LPG/petrol

== Second generation (2010) ==
Volvo S60 (second generation)
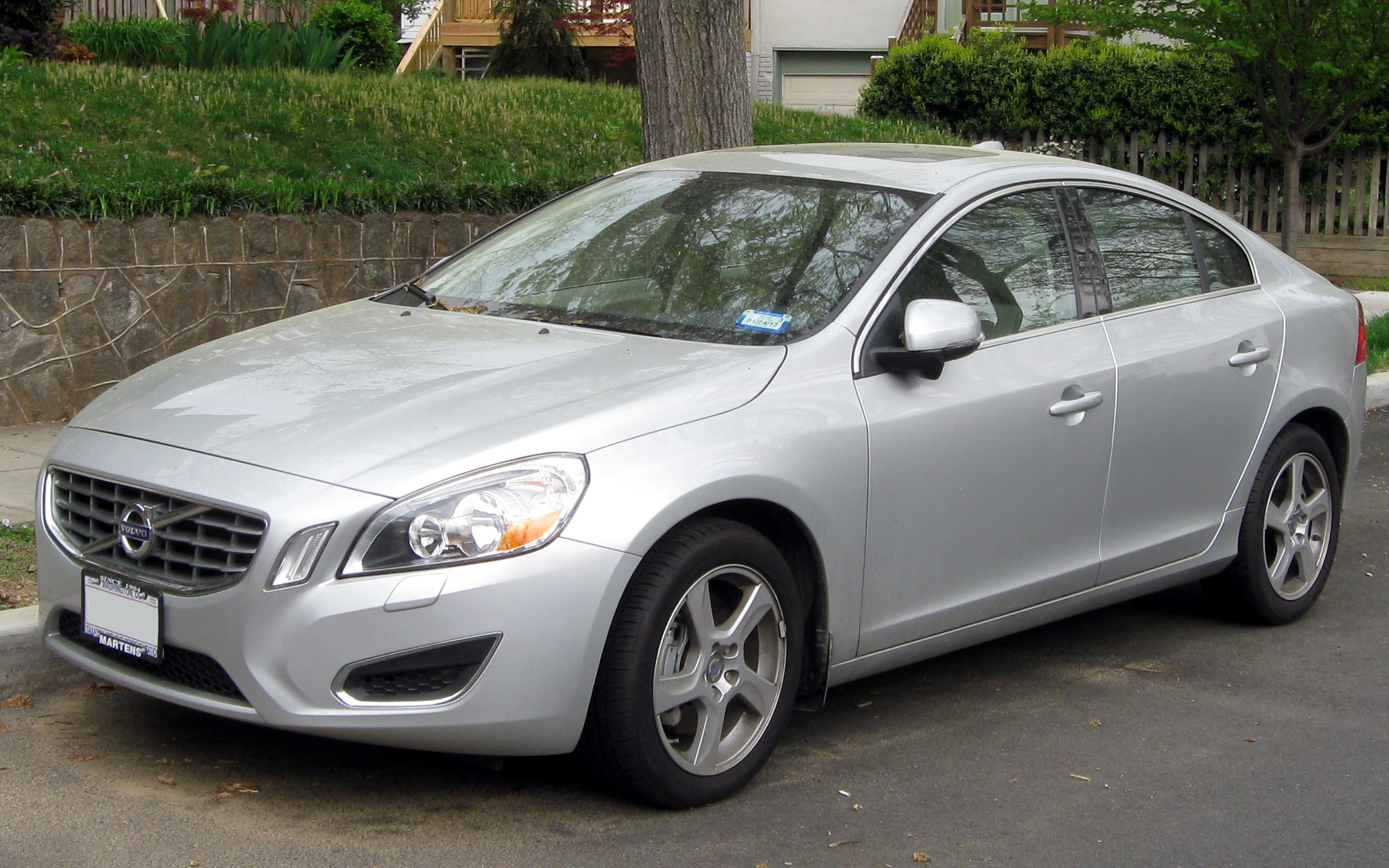

Overview
- Production: 2010–2018
- Model years: 2011–2018 (S60); 2015–2019 (S60L)
- Assembly: Sweden: Torslanda; India: Bengaluru (Volvo Trucks); Malaysia: Shah Alam (VCMM); China: Chengdu (ZAMC)
- Designer: Örjan Sterner (exterior); Jonathan Disley; Tony Hunter (interior)

Body and chassis
- Class: Compact executive car
- Platform: Volvo P3 platform
- Related: Volvo V60

Powertrain
- Engine: 1596 cc B4164T turbo I4; 1596 cc B4164T2 turbo FFV I4 (T4F); 1969 cc B4204T11 turbo I4; 1969 cc B4204T43 twincharged I4; 1999 cc B4204T6/T7 turbo I4; 1999 cc B4204T9 twincharged I4; 2497 cc B5254T12 turbo I5; 2952 cc B6304T4/T5 turbo I6; diesel: 1560 cc D4162T turbo I4; 1969 cc D4204T5/T8/T9/T11/T14 turbo I4; 1984 cc D5204T3/T7/T21 turbo I5; 2400 cc D5244T10/T11/T15 twin-turbo I5
- Transmission: 6-speed Volvo M66 manual; 6-speed Aisin TF-80SC automatic; 8-speed Aisin TG-81SC automatic; 6-speed GETRAG MPS 6 – 7 Power Shift Dual Clutch automatic

Dimensions
- Wheelbase: 2,775 mm (109.3 in); 2,855 mm (112.4 in) (S60L)
- Length: 4,628 mm (182.2 in); 4,708 mm (185.4 in) (S60L)
- Width: 1,865 mm (73.4 in)
- Height: 1,484 mm (58.4 in)
- Curb weight: 1,570–1,766 kg (3,461–3,893 lb)

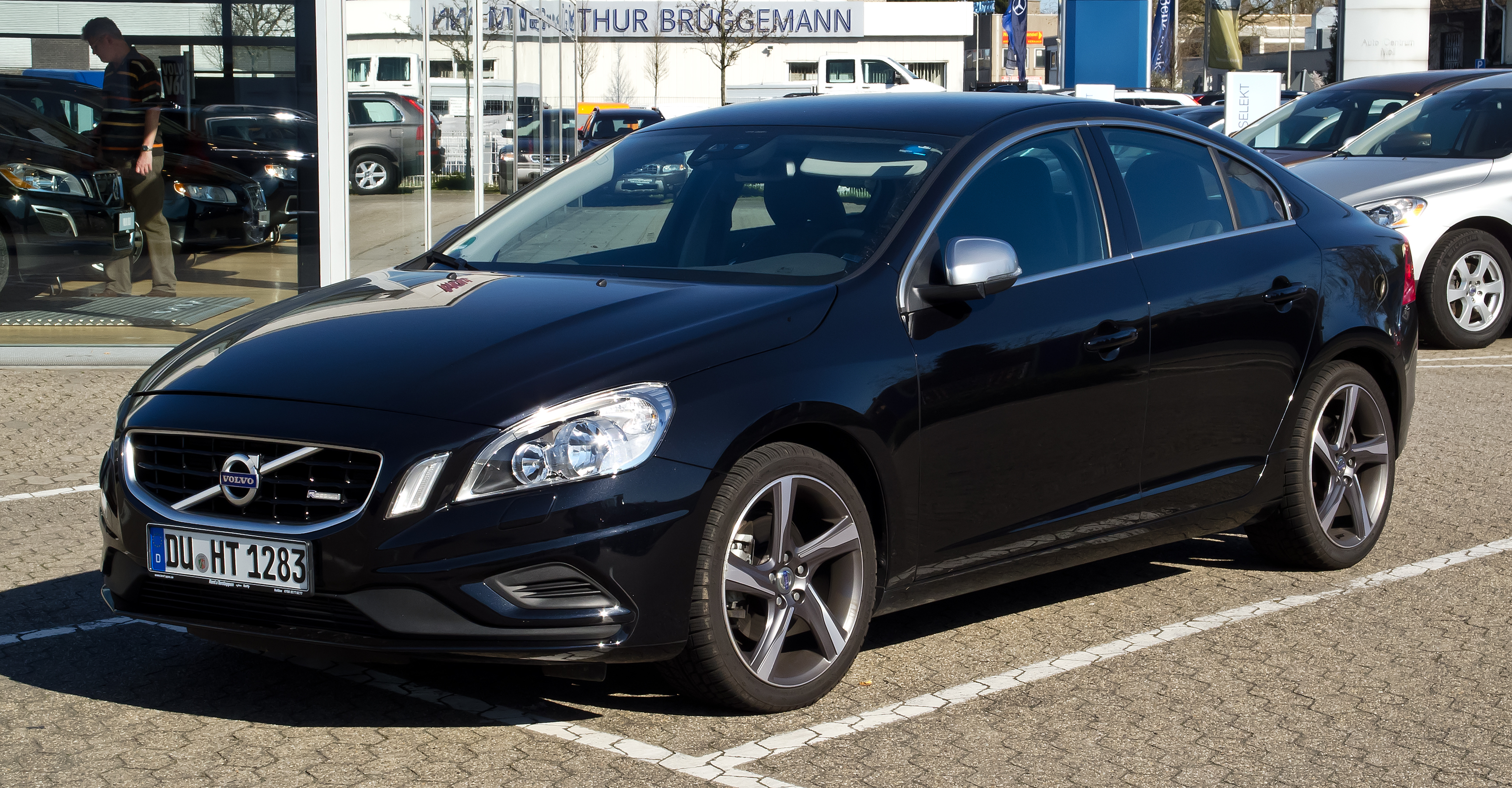
Pre-facelift Volvo S60 D5 R-Design (Germany)

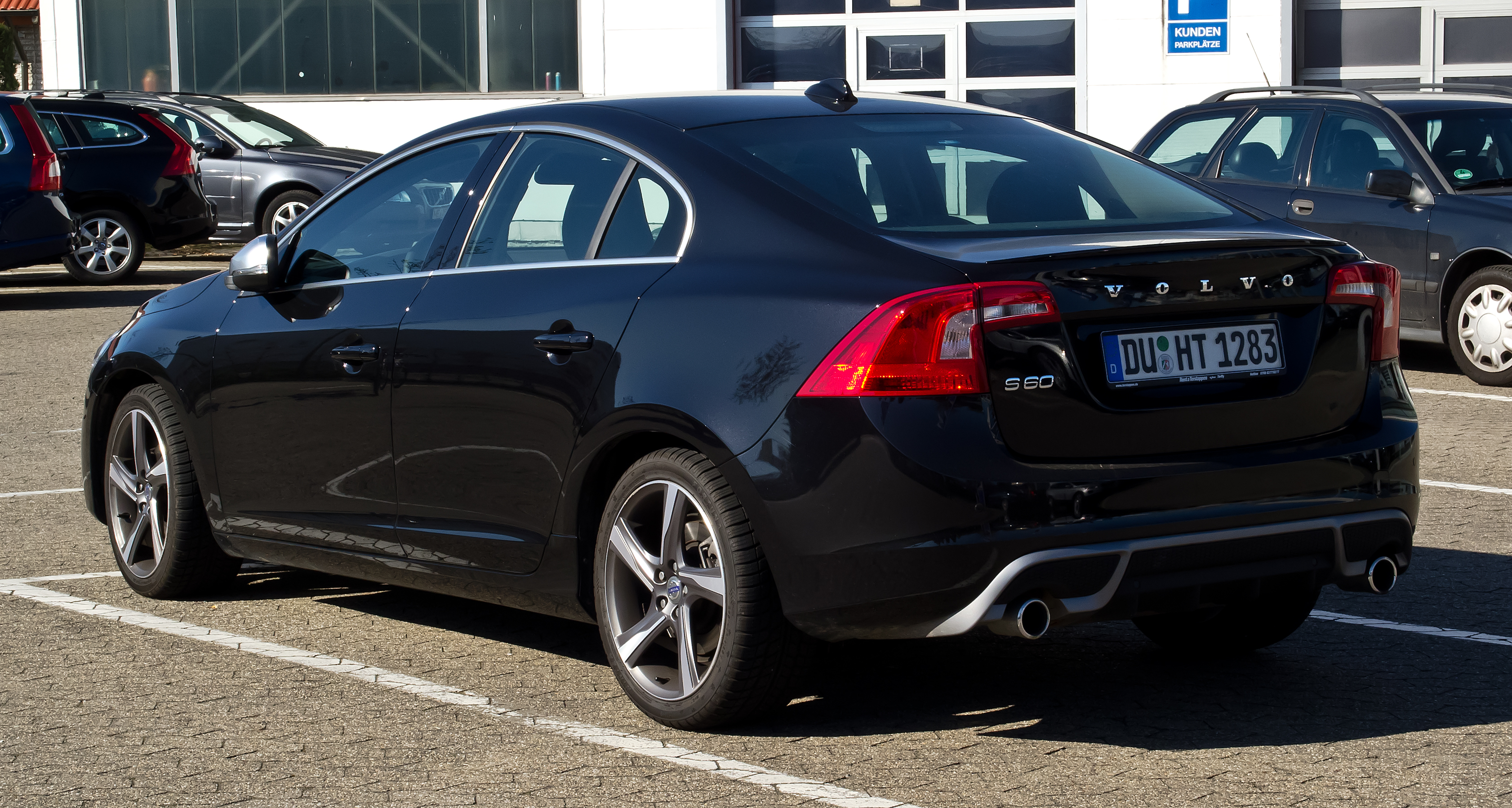
Pre-facelift Volvo S60 D5 R-Design (Germany)

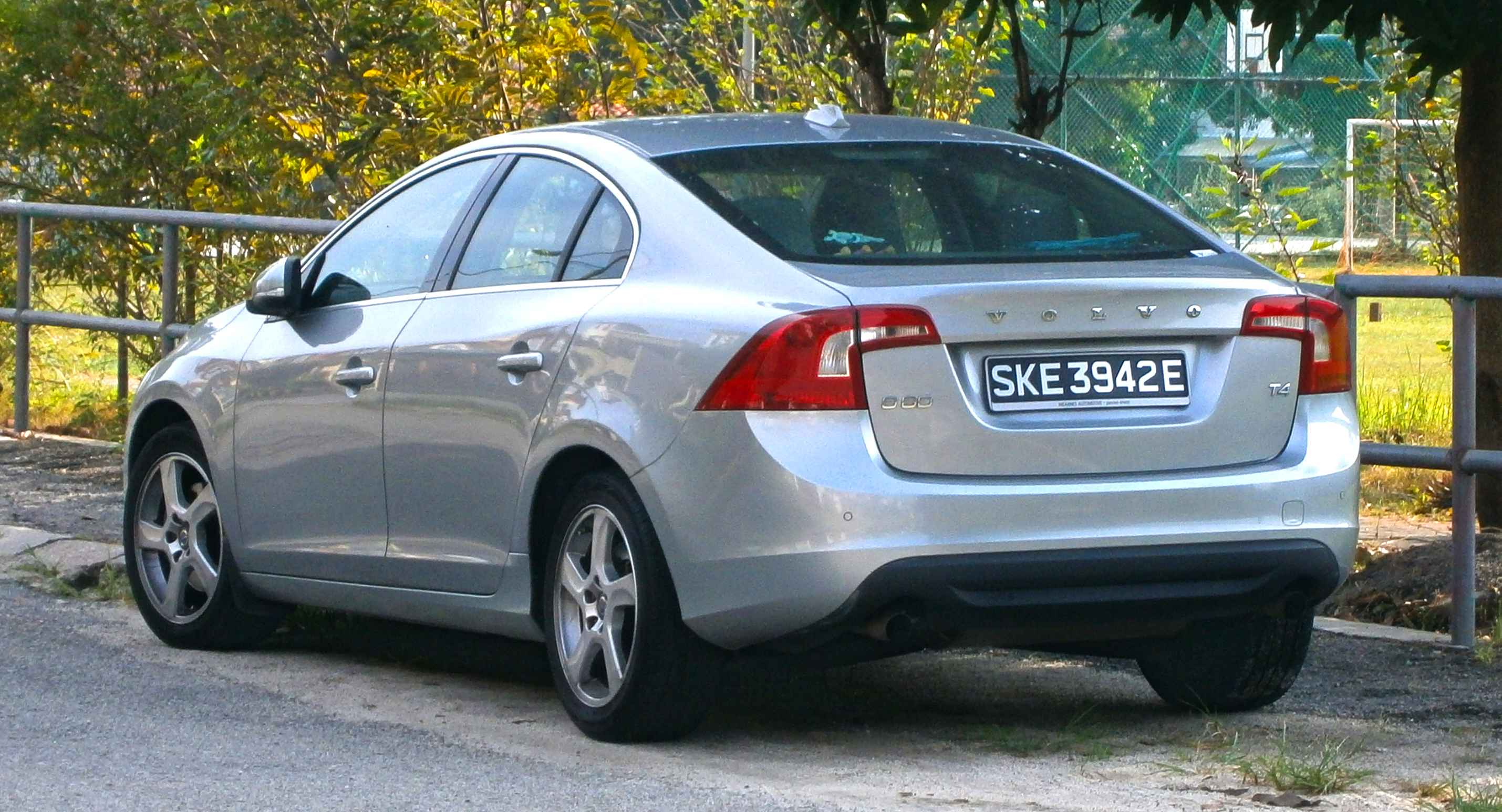
Pre-facelift Volvo S60 T4 (Singapore)

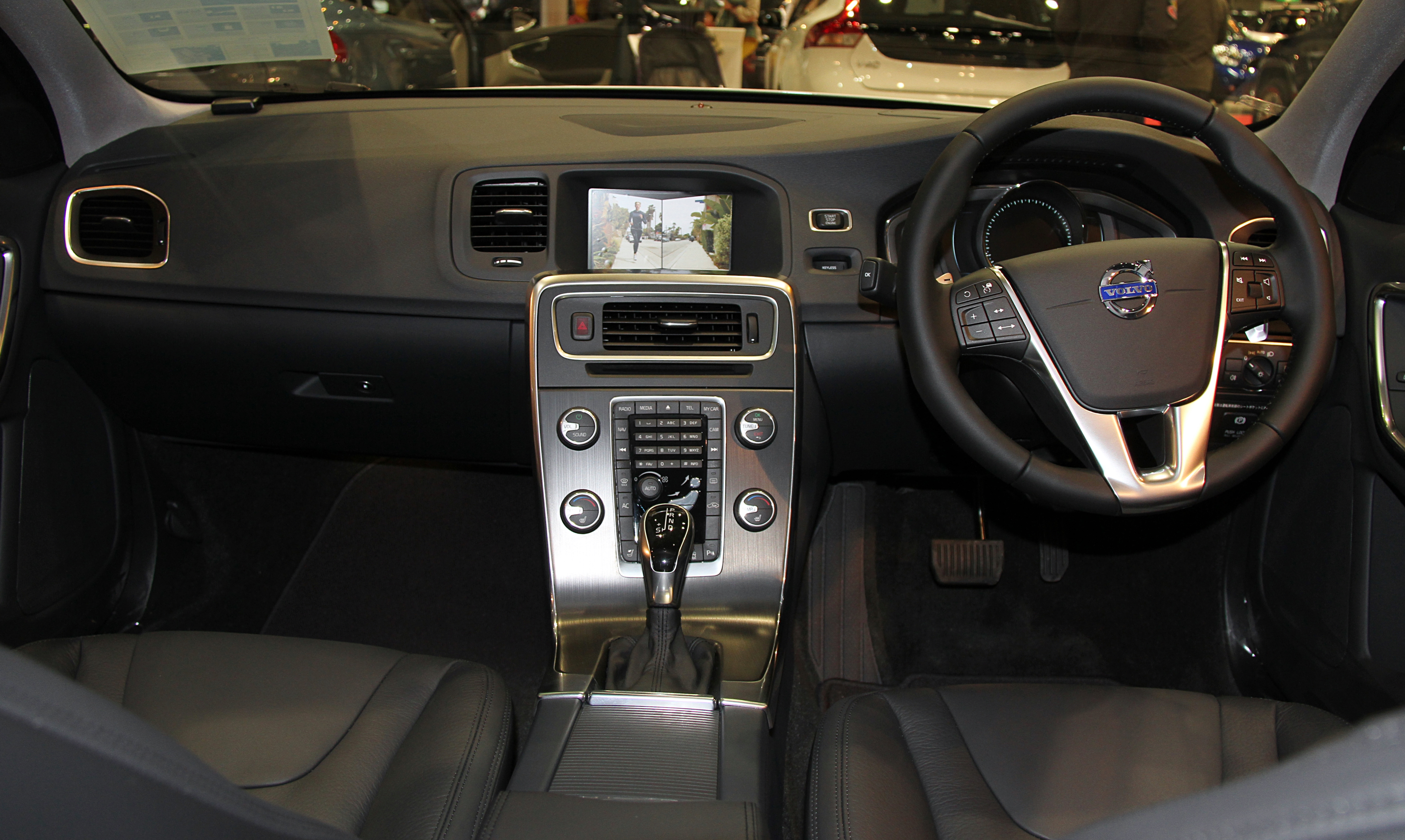
Interior

The second generation S60 began production in Ghent, Belgium on May 17, 2010, with an expected annual production of 90,000 vehicles. Official photos were released in November 2009, and the car was publicly unveiled at the Geneva Motor Show in March 2010. It debuted as a 2011 model in North America. The second generation S60 also arrived with the 5th generation Haldex AWD system. More differences in the second generation S60 include the new large Volvo iron symbol, parallel to the grille LED day running lamps and larger spaced letters in the brand name on rear.

The engine range of the S60 and V60 comprises four petrol engines and three diesels. The engines available are the T3, T4, T5 and T6 petrol engines and D3, D5 and 1.6D DRIVe diesel engines, the latter of which has Stop Start Technology to increase the efficiency of the engine. The 2.4-litre D5 plug-in hybrid version, fitted with a five-cylinder diesel engine and a 50 kW electric motor, was scheduled for sale in Europe by November 2012.

The Volvo S60 and V60 come with Volvo's City Safety system as standard, which is the same system fitted to the related Volvo XC60. This system can automatically apply the brakes in the event of an impending collision in "City Traffic" below 19 mph (31 km/h). Also, a new safety feature named "Pedestrian Detection" (available on both the V60 and S60) detects people in front of the car and automatically applies the brakes if the driver does not react in time. The sedan used Volvo's new design language already seen in the Volvo XC60 concept.

=== 2013 T5 engine update ===
In 2013, the T5 engine was revamped before the launch of the Drive-E arrival. Among the tweaks to the T5 power plant is a boost in engine compression to 9.5:1 from 9.0, engine torque peaks at 4200 rpm and engine management changes provide faster gear changes and upshifts when the 6-speed automatic gearbox is in the sport mode. Output remains the same over 2012 at 250 bhp (186 kW; 253 PS) and 266 lb⋅ft (361 N⋅m) of torque, although there is a provision for overboost from the turbo which bumps the torque number to 295 lb⋅ft (400 N⋅m). The changes in compression ratio helps the S60 T5 deliver 1 mpg_{‑US} (0.43 km/L) extra in the city and combined cycle. Front-drive versions are rated at 21 mpg_{‑US} (8.9 km/L) city/30 mpg_{‑US} (13 km/L) highway for a combined of 24 mpg_{‑US} (10 km/L), while the AWD model is 1 mpg_{‑US} (0.43 km/L) less across the board. Volvo also says the T5 AWD is good for a 0–60 mph (0–97 km/h) sprint of 6.6 seconds, while the front-drive version is 0.2 seconds quicker.

=== 2014 model year update ===
Changes include all-new exterior panels from the A-pillars forward including a new hood, front fenders and fascia; a wider grille with a larger Ironmark is flanked by new headlights while a larger, wider lower front intake gains bright accents and horizontally mounted LED daytime running lights; new integrated exhaust pipes at rear, a new Adaptive Digital TFT Display instrument cluster for select models (R-Design versions include unique blue instrument dials), new paddle shifters on T6 AWD and R-Design models (optional on T5), Advanced Quick Shift (AQS) option on all T6 engines and activated when the transmission is set to sport mode or when using paddle shifters, IntelliSafe with Pedestrian Detection and Cyclist Detection with full auto brake and Cross Traffic Alert became part of the Technology Package, a new radar-based Blind Spot Information System (BLIS) to monitor and alert the driver to rapidly approaching vehicles behind the car while still informing the driver about vehicles in the blind spots on both sides of the car, Cross Traffic Alert with radar sensors at the rear end of the car to alert the driver to crossing traffic from the sides when reversing out of a parking space.

North America models went on sale as 2014 model year vehicles in late 2013. Early models include S60 T5 (base, Premier, Premier Plus, Platinum), T6 (AWD, Premier Plus, Platinum, R-Design AWD, RD Platinum).

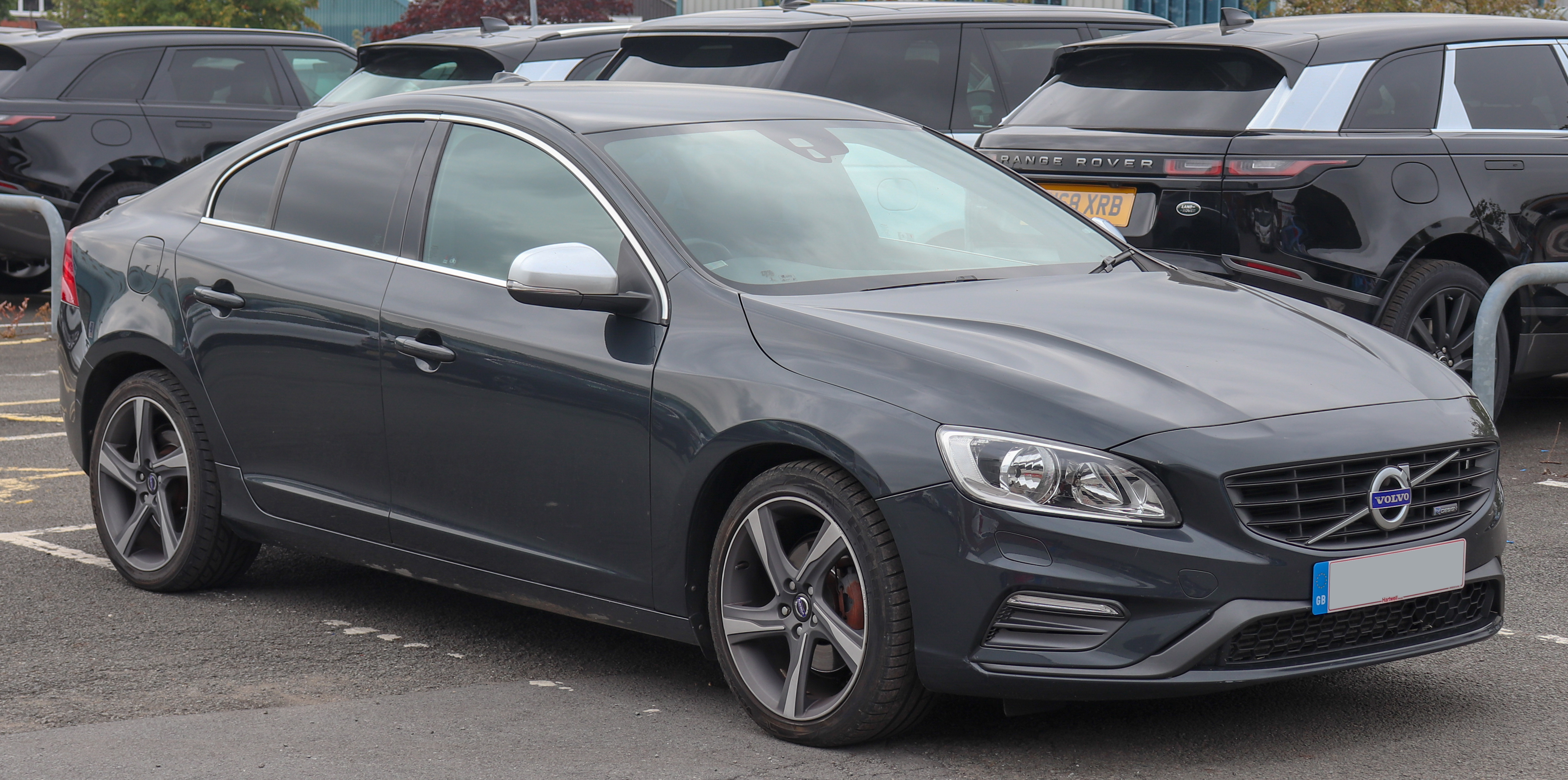
Facelift Volvo S60 R-Design (UK)

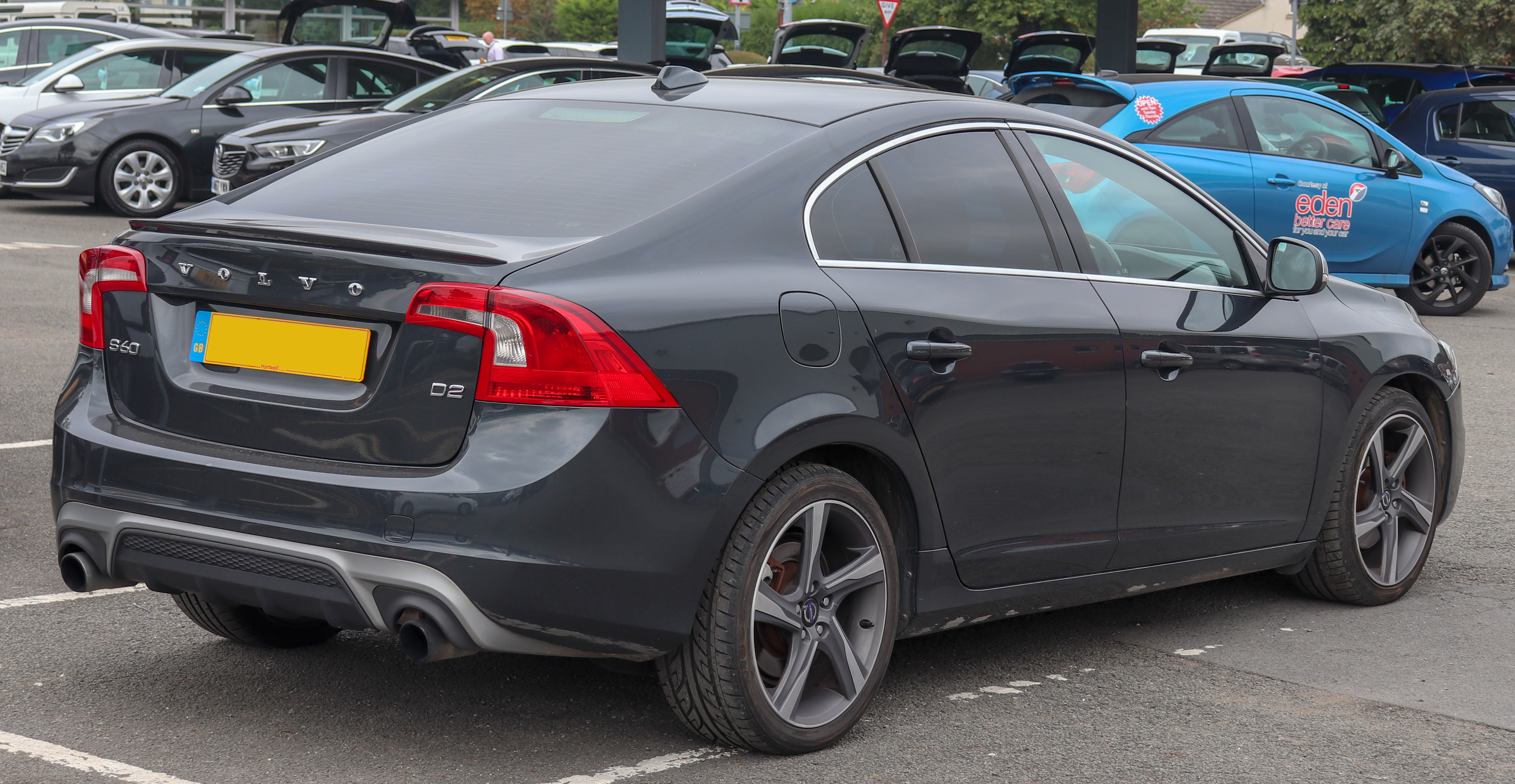
Facelift Volvo S60 R-Design (UK)

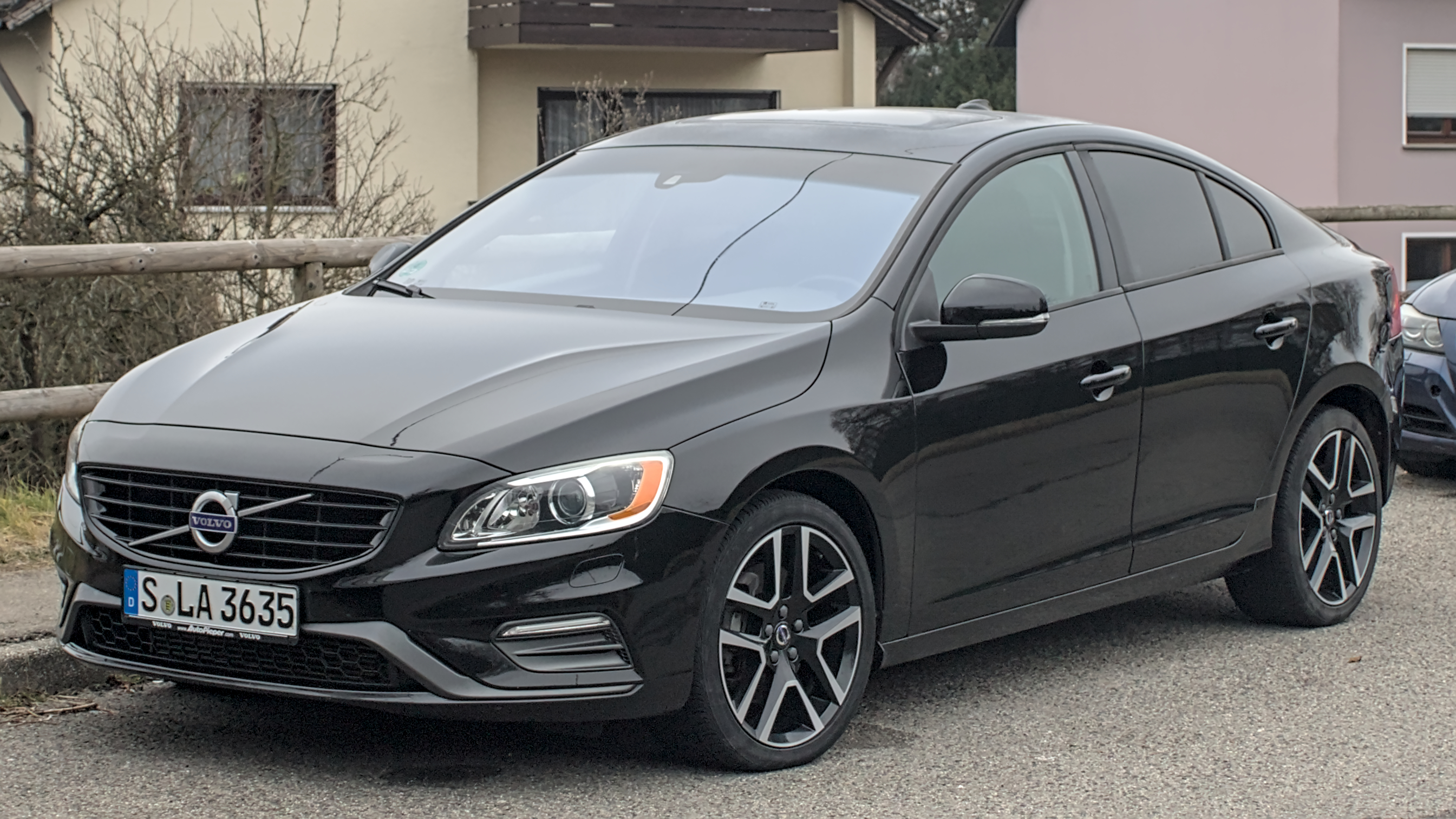
Facelift Volvo S60 T5 Luxury (Germany)

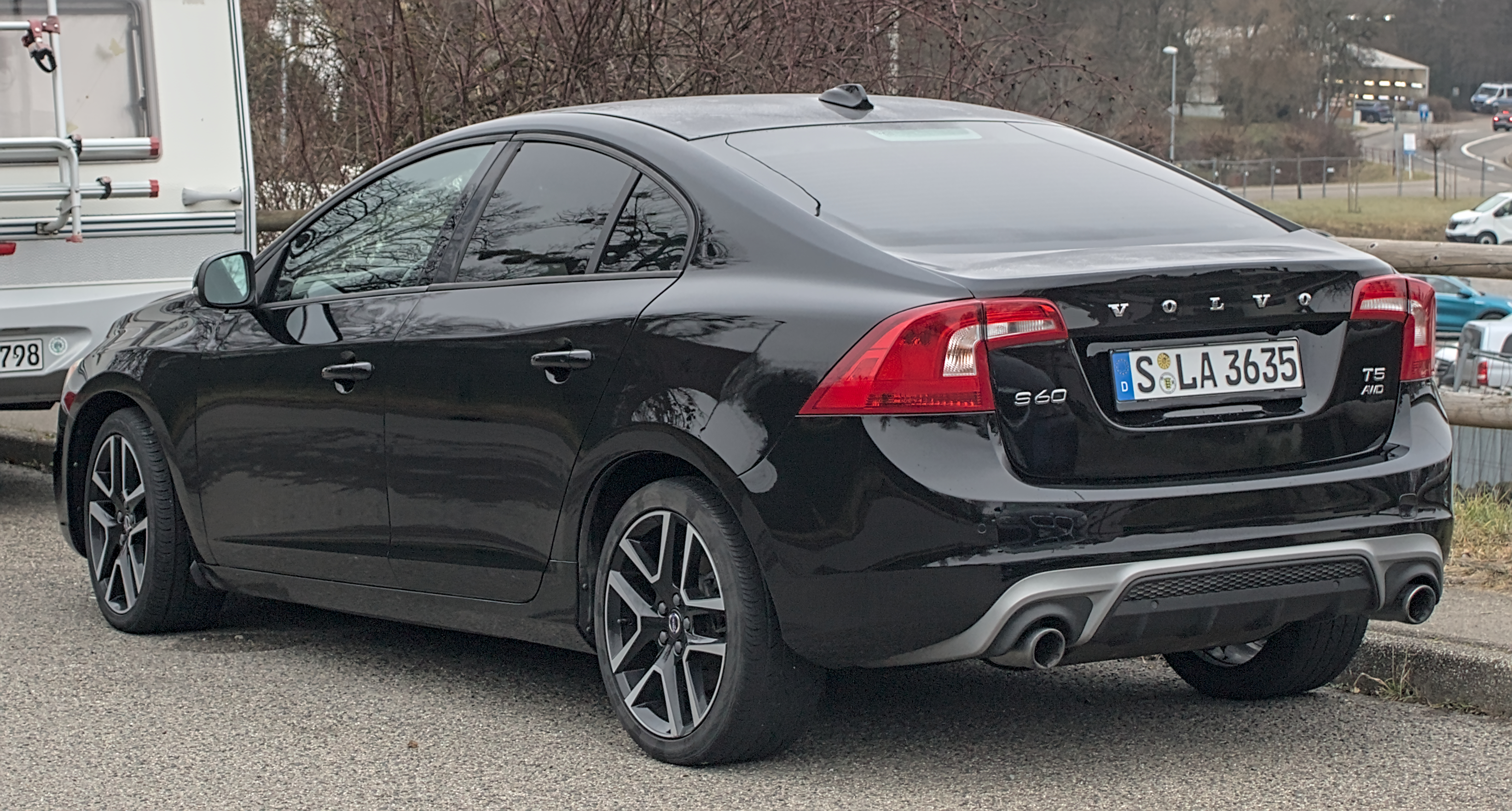
Facelift Volvo S60 T5 Luxury (Germany)

=== Second-generation models ===
==== S60L ====
The S60L, also marketed as S60 Inscription, is the top-of-the-line, long wheelbase model of the S60. It has been lengthened by 80 mm (3.1 in) compared to the standard model to give additional legroom for rear passengers. It is also manufactured in Chengdu, China, and is the first consumer automobile manufactured in China to be sold in the United States. The S60L commenced production in October 2014. In late 2018, the S60L received a minor facelift that included a new grille and emblems that feature the updated Volvo logo. For the 2019 model year, the S60L was sold in China exclusively.

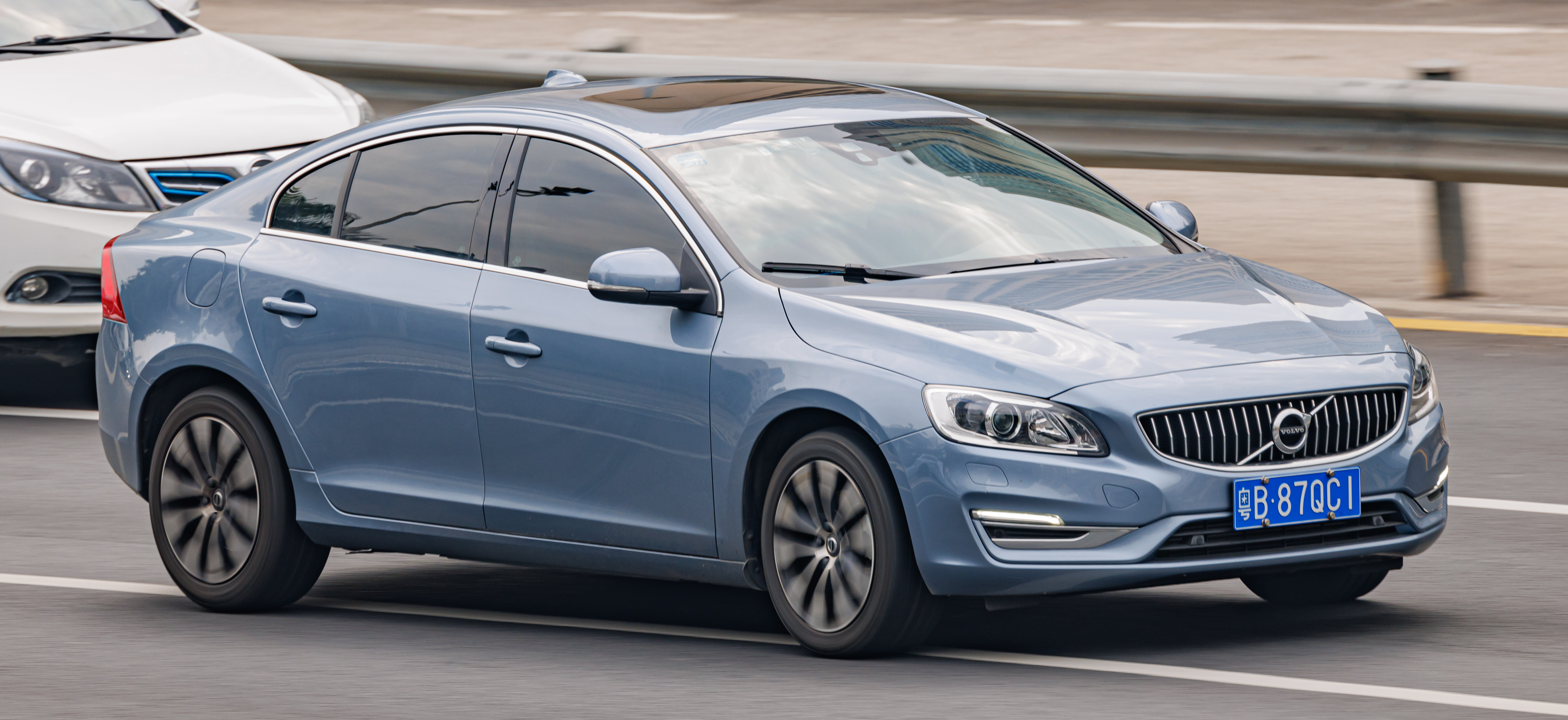
Facelift Volvo S60L (China)

==== S60L PHEV ====
The Volvo S60L PPHEV (Petrol Plug-in Hybrid Electric Vehicle) concept car was unveiled at the 2014 Beijing International Automotive Exhibition. Volvo Cars announced that the S60L PPHEV will be manufactured at the Chengdu plant and is scheduled to be launched in China in the first half of 2015.

The S60L PPHEV shares the same electric-drive technology as the Volvo V60 Plug-in Hybrid, but instead of the diesel engine of the V60, the S60L PPHEV has a 2-liter, four-cylinder gasoline turbocharged engine from Volvo Cars’ new Drive-E engine family. The 50 kW (67 hp) electric motor is powered by an 11.2 kWh lithium-ion battery pack that delivers an all-electric range of up to 50 km (31 mi). The petrol-powered engine produces 177 kW (237 hp) and 350 N·m (258 lb-ft) of torque. The driver can select via three buttons among three driving modes: Pure, Hybrid or Power. In the default hybrid mode, the CO_{2} emissions are about 50 g/km, corresponding to a fuel consumption of 2.0 L/100 km (140 mpg_{‑imp}; 120 mpg_{‑US}). By selecting Pure mode, the car runs in all-electric mode, and the Power mode combines the capabilities of the engine and motor to deliver 225 kW (302 hp), 550 N·m (405 lb-ft) of torque and 0–100 km/h (62 mph) acceleration in 5.5 seconds.

Volvo unveiled the production model, the S60L T6 Twin Engine PHEV, at the 2015 Shanghai Motor Show. Sales of the S60L T6 PHEV, limited to the Chinese market, began on 22 April 2015. The production model has an all-electric range of 53 km (33 mi).

==== S60 Cross Country ====
A new limited production model known as the S60 Cross Country saw a limited American release in the autumn of 2015 (as it was for the 2015 model year in Europe), with each dealership only getting one car. This variant is similar to the Volvo V60 Cross Country, as it is a raised sedan variant of the S60. Limited to about 500 units from 2016 to 2017.

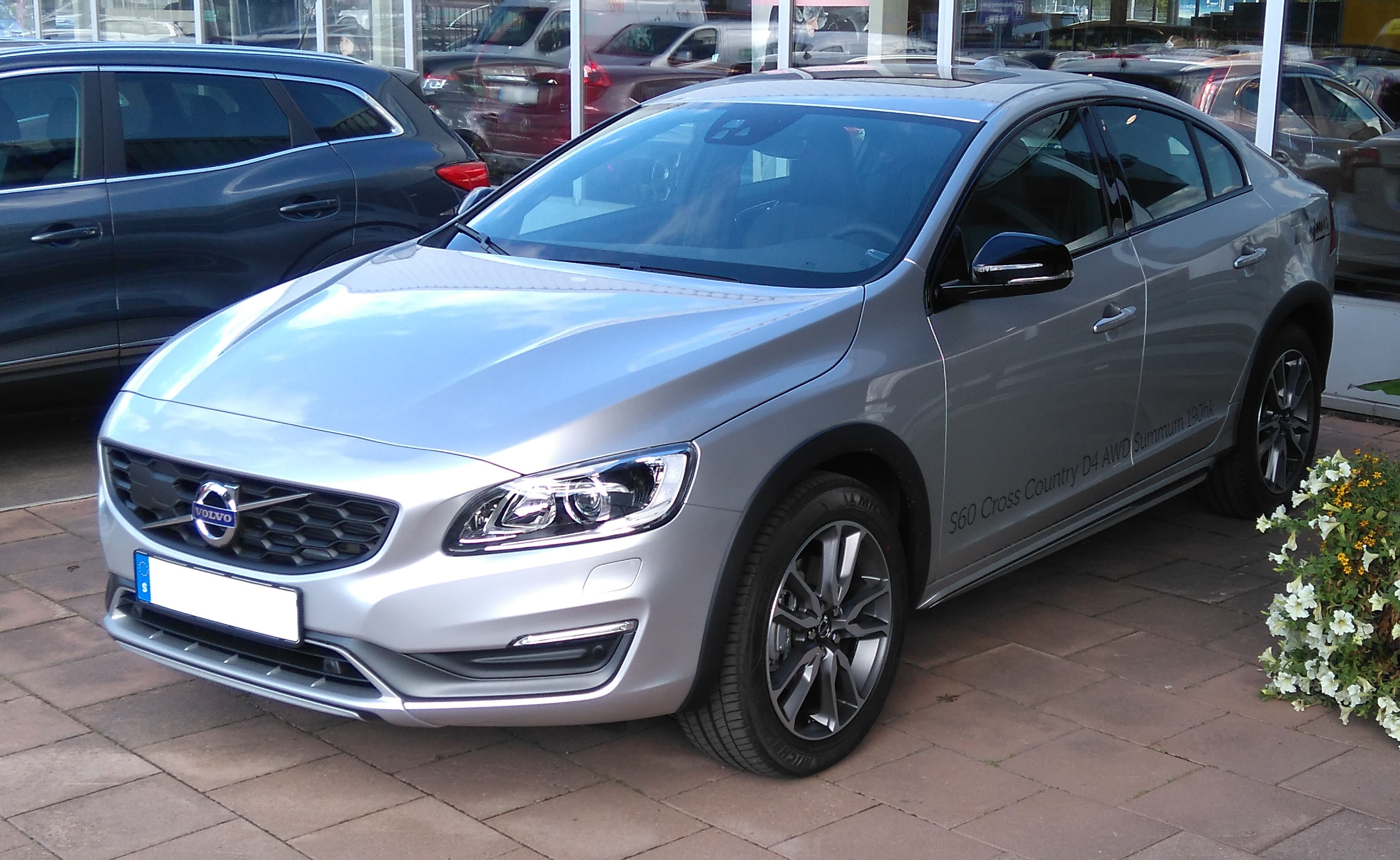
Volvo S60 Cross Country (Sweden)

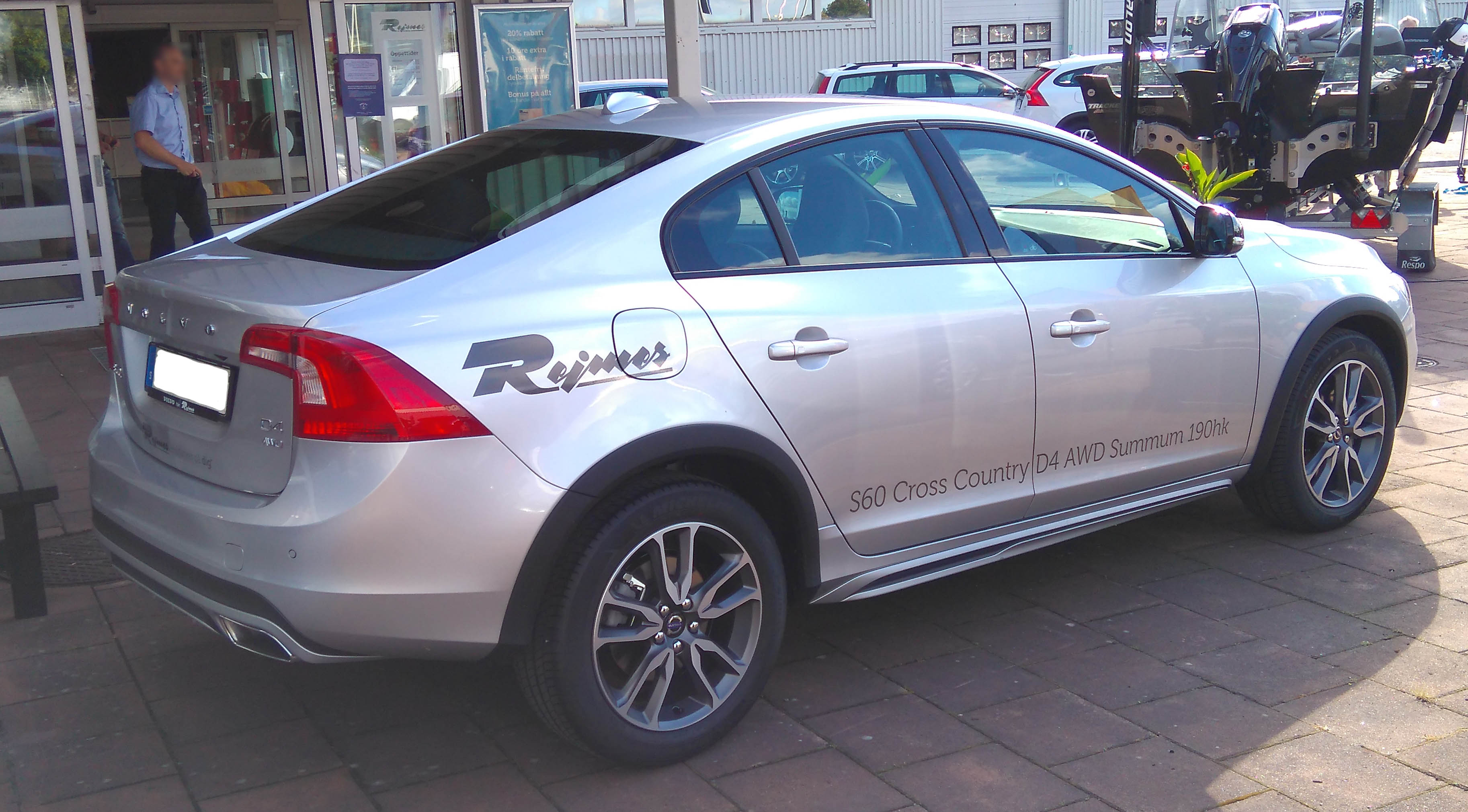
Volvo S60 Cross Country (Sweden)

=== Concepts and special editions ===
==== Volvo S60 Polestar performance concept (2012) ====
The Volvo S60 Polestar performance concept is a version of the Volvo S60 T6 AWD with a Volvo T6 inline six (B6304T4) engine rated at 508 PS (374 kW; 501 hp) at 6500 rpm and 575 N⋅m (424 lb⋅ft) of torque at 5500 rpm. It features a modified cylinder head and combustion chambers, modified inlet manifold and air intake, special manufactured connecting rods, Garrett 3171 turbocharger, Ferrita 3.5" stainless steel exhaust system, reinforced M66C (close ratio) manual 6-speed gear box, Haldex E-LSD in rear, Haldex Gen4 XWD, 265/30R19 tires, 9.5×19-inch Polestar Rims, chassis lowered by 30 mm (1.2 in), Öhlins 3-way shock absorbers, reinforced anti-roll bars in the front and rear, increased track width by 20 mm (0.79 in) in the front and 40 mm (1.6 in) in the rear, Polestar-tuned EHPAS steering, stabilising X-members (front and rear), modified control-arms with uniballs in the front and rear, reinforced bushings in sub-frame and control-arms, modified engine mounts, 380 mm ventilated front brake discs with Polestar-Brembo 6 piston calipers, 302 mm (11.9 in) ventilated discs rear brake discs with Polestar-Volvo calipers, brake cooling air intakes from front, lowered front splitter and larger rear spoiler to reduce high speed lift, carbon fibre diffuser, body 20 mm (0.79 in) widened in the front and rear, Polestar designed seats with increased support, Alcantara on all functional areas (steering wheel, gear knob, and seats) to ensure maximum grip and a lowered centre console for optimised gear-lever ergonomics.

The vehicle was unveiled at the Gothenburg CityArena.

=== 2013 ===
The 2013 Volvo S60 Polestar is a limited (50 units) version of the Volvo S60 T6 AWD for the Australian market. It is based on the S60 Polestar performance concept and features an inline 6 engine rated at 258 kW (346 hp; 351 PS) and 508 N⋅m (375 lb⋅ft) of torque. It includes a new BorgWarner turbo, new intercooler, a 2.5 in (64 mm) stainless full-flow exhaust system with 3.5 in (89 mm) tail pipes, Polestar Öhlins 2-way adjustable shock absorbers, upgraded springs (60N/mm front, 65N/mm rear. (80% stiffer than stock)), upgraded stabilizers in the front and rear, upgraded rear tie blades, upgraded top mount in the front and rear, upgraded toe link arms in the rear, strut brace with carbon fibre reinforcement, Michelin Pilot Super Sport 235/40R19 tires, 8x19-inch ET51 bespoke Polestar rims, Polestar-tuned AWF21 six-speed automatic gearbox with a launch control system, a Polestar-tuned Haldex 4WD system, modified transmission software for faster shifts and launch control, modified AWD software for more rear torque, front 336x29 mm ventilated brake discs with Jurid 958 performance brake pads, rear 302x22 mm ventilated brake discs with HP2000 Brembo performance brake pads, new Polestar front splitter corners, new Polestar rear spoiler, new Polestar diffuser, Polestar door trims, Polestar badging on the front grille, boot and engine cover, Polestar shift knob, Polestar limited edition plate on the door sills and steering wheel and black outside mirror covers. Delivery began in June 2013.

=== 2014 ===
The 2014 S60 Polestar was offered in Canada, the Netherlands, Japan, Sweden, Switzerland, United Kingdom and the United States. Based on the S60 Polestar Concept car and the Australian S60 Polestar, it includes a Polestar Öhlins shock absorber system, Polestar 8×20-inch ET53 bespoke rims with 245/35R20 tyres, a new twin-scroll BorgWarner turbo with new intercooler, 2.5 in (64 mm) stainless full-flow exhaust system with 3.5 in (89 mm) tail pipes, AWF21 automatic gearbox with paddle shift system, Polestar transmission calibration for faster gearshifts, launch control and curve-hold functionality; Polestar Haldex calibration for more rear torque dynamic distribution, Polestar calibrated stability control system, front 371 mm × 32 mm (14.6 in × 1.3 in) ventilated and floating brake discs with Polestar/Brembo six piston brake calipers, rear 302 mm × 22 mm (11.89 in × 0.87 in) ventilated brake disc. Delivery was set to begin in June 2014 to the local markets.

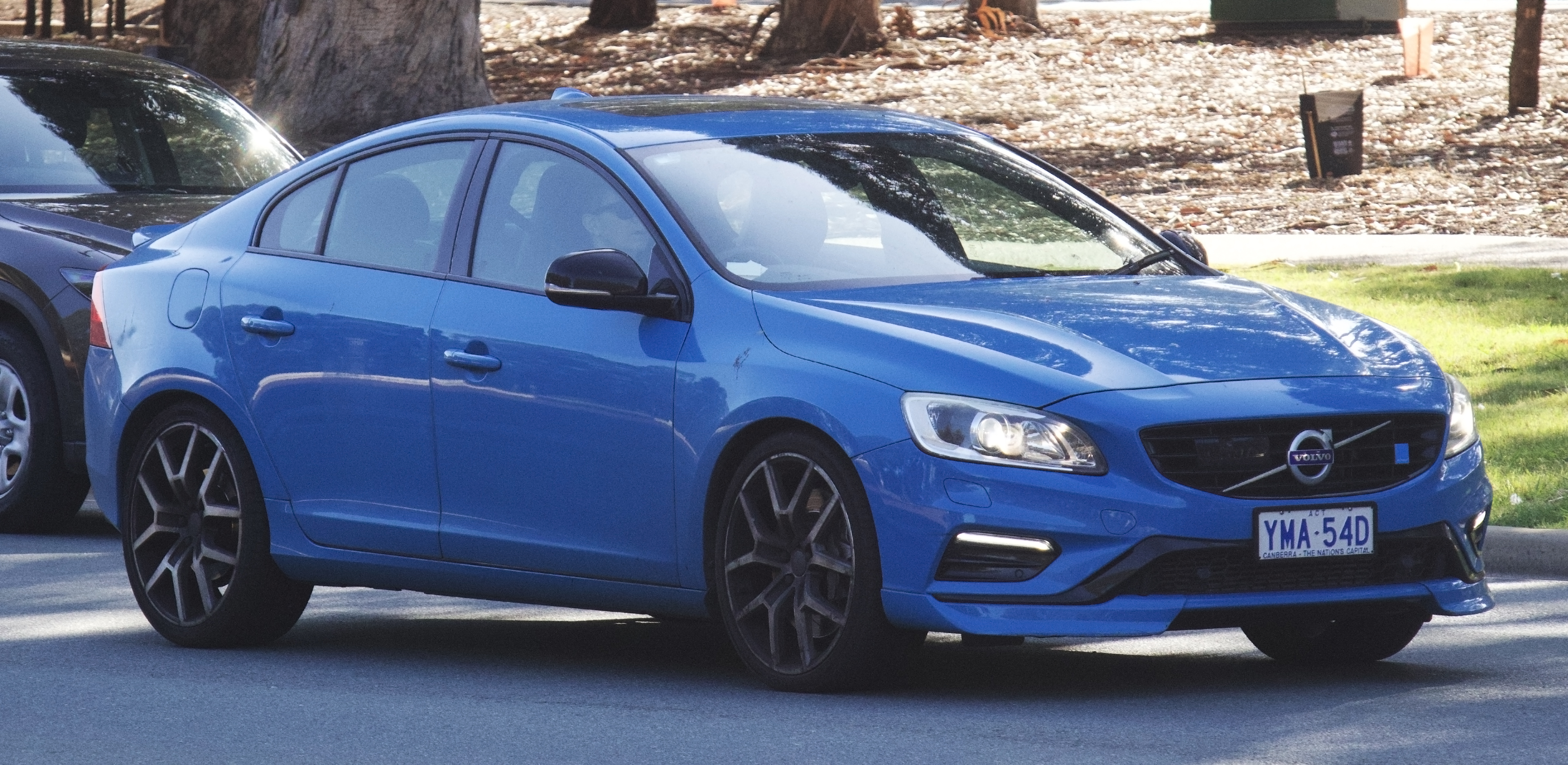
Volvo S60 Polestar (AUS)

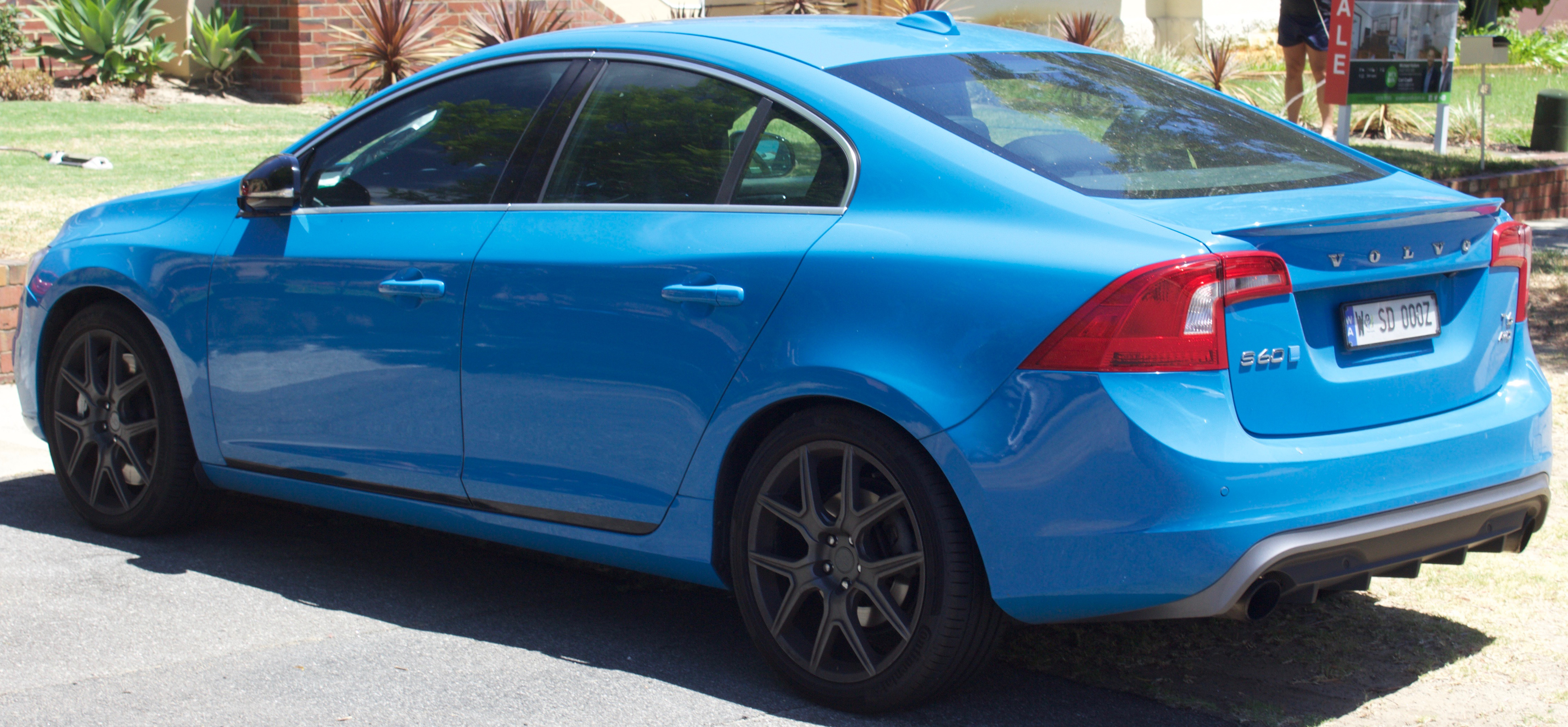
Volvo S60 Polestar (AUS)

=== 2015 ===
The 2015 S60 Polestar's 3.0-liter inline six-cylinder produces 350 PS (257 kW; 345 hp) and 502 N⋅m (370 lb⋅ft) of torque, an additional 20 hp (15 kW; 20 PS) and 20 N⋅m (15 lb⋅ft) more torque compared to the same engine in the S60 R-Design. This is developed by way of massaged engine management software, a stainless exhaust with 64-millimetre (2.5 in) pipes, new twin-scroll BorgWarner turbochargers and new intercooler. Polestar also did work to the transmission with new calibration for quicker gearshifts and launch control capabilities. The Haldex four-wheel-drive system also has Polestar tuning for more rear torque distribution, and the stability control system has been massaged. The chassis is firmer with a suspension that features Öhlins shock absorbers with 80 percent stiffer springs sitting on 20-inch wheels that would normally come wrapped with Michelin Pilot Super Sport tires from the factory. Brakes get a nice upgrade with 370-millimetre (14.6 in) front discs (replacing 340-millimetre [13.2 in] ones on the R-Design) with six-piston Brembo calipers and 300-millimetre (11.8 in)-inch rear discs. Visual changes include new front and rear splitters, rear spoiler and diffuser. Inside there's a thick-rimmed steering wheel and upgraded seats with suede inserts, suede door inserts and blue accent stitching throughout. According to Volvo, it has a 0–60 mph (97 km/h) time of 4.7 seconds and an electronically limited top speed of 250 km/h (155 mph), up from 210 km/h (130 mph).

=== Engines ===
Petrol engines
Model	Engine code	Year(s)	Power	Torque at rpm	Displacement	Comment
T3	B4164T3	2011–2018	110 kW (150 PS; 148 hp)	240 N⋅m (177 lb⋅ft)	1,596 cc (97.4 cu in)	turbocharged inline-four
T4	B4164T	2011–2018	132 kW (179 PS; 177 hp)	240 N⋅m (177 lb⋅ft)	1,596 cc (97.4 cu in)	turbocharged inline-four
DRIVe	B4164T2	2010–2018	134 kW (182 PS; 180 hp)	240 N⋅m (177 lb⋅ft)	1,596 cc (97.4 cu in)	FFV turbocharged inline-four
2.0T	B4204T6	2010–2018	149 kW (203 PS; 200 hp)	300 N⋅m (221 lb⋅ft)	1,999 cc (122.0 cu in)	turbocharged inline-four
T5 FWD Drive-E	B4204T7	2014–2018	180 kW (245 PS; 241 hp)	350 N⋅m (258 lb⋅ft)	1,999 cc (122.0 cu in)	turbocharged inline-four
T5 (AWD)	B5254T12	2013–2015	187 kW (254 PS; 251 hp)	360 N⋅m (266 lb⋅ft)	2,497 cc (152.4 cu in)	turbocharged inline-five
T6 FWD Drive-E	B4204T9	2014–2018	225 kW (306 PS; 302 hp)	400 N⋅m (295 lb⋅ft)	1,999 cc (122.0 cu in)	twincharged inline-four
T6 AWD	B6304T4	2011–2015	224 kW (305 PS; 300 hp)	440 N⋅m (325 lb⋅ft)	2,952 cc (180.1 cu in)	turbocharged inline-six
T6 Drive-E R-Design	B4204T9	2016–2018	225 kW (306 PS; 302 hp)	400 N⋅m (295 lb⋅ft)	1,999 cc (122.0 cu in)	twincharged inline-four
T6 R-Design (US)	B6304T4	2012–2016	242 kW (329 PS; 325 hp)	485 N⋅m (358 lb⋅ft)	2,952 cc (180.1 cu in)	turbocharged inline-six
Polestar	B6304T5	2014–2016	257 kW (349 PS; 345 hp)	500 N⋅m (369 lb⋅ft)	2,952 cc (180.1 cu in)	turbocharged inline-six
Polestar	B4204T43	2017–2018	270 kW (367 PS; 362 hp)	470 N⋅m (347 lb⋅ft)	1,969 cc (120.2 cu in)	twincharged inline-four

Diesel engines
Model	Engine code	Year(s)	Power	Torque at rpm	Displacement	Comment
D2	D4162T	2011–2015	84 kW (114 PS; 113 hp)	270 N⋅m (199 lb⋅ft)	1,560 cc (95.2 cu in)	turbocharged inline-four
D2	D4204T8	2015–2018	88 kW (120 PS; 118 hp)	280 N⋅m (207 lb⋅ft)	1,969 cc (120.2 cu in)	turbocharged inline-four
D3	D5204T7	2010–2014	100 kW (136 PS; 134 hp)	320 N⋅m (236 lb⋅ft)	1,984 cc (121.1 cu in)	turbocharged inline-five
D3	D4204T9	2015–2018	110 kW (150 PS; 148 hp)	320 N⋅m (236 lb⋅ft)	1,969 cc (120.2 cu in)	turbocharged inline-four
D4	D5204T3	2011–2013	120 kW (163 PS; 161 hp)	400 N⋅m (295 lb⋅ft)	1,984 cc (121.1 cu in)	turbocharged inline-five
D4	D4204T5	2014–2016	133 kW (181 PS; 178 hp)	400 N⋅m (295 lb⋅ft)	1,969 cc (120.2 cu in)	turbocharged inline-four
D4	D4204T14	2017–2018	140 kW (190 PS; 188 hp)	400 N⋅m (295 lb⋅ft)	1,969 cc (120.2 cu in)	turbocharged inline-four
D4 AWD	D5204T21	2013–2018	140 kW (190 PS; 188 hp)	420 N⋅m (310 lb⋅ft)	1,984 cc (121.1 cu in)	turbocharged inline-five
D5	D5244T11	2010–2014	158 kW (215 PS; 212 hp)	420 N⋅m (310 lb⋅ft)	2,400 cc (146.5 cu in)	turbocharged inline-five
D5	D5244T15	2010–2014	158 kW (215 PS; 212 hp)	470 N⋅m (347 lb⋅ft)	2,400 cc (146.5 cu in)	turbocharged inline-five
D5	D4204T11	2015–2018	165 kW (224 PS; 221 hp)	470 N⋅m (347 lb⋅ft)	1,969 cc (120.2 cu in)	turbocharged inline-four
D5 AWD	D5244T15	2010–2014	158 kW (215 PS; 212 hp)	470 N⋅m (347 lb⋅ft)	2,400 cc (146.5 cu in)	turbocharged inline-five
D5 AWD	D4204T11	2015–2018	165 kW (224 PS; 221 hp)	470 N⋅m (347 lb⋅ft)	1,969 cc (120.2 cu in)	turbocharged inline-four

=== Safety ===
==== ANCAP ====
ANCAP test results* Volvo S60 front-wheel-drive variants with 5 cylinder diesel engine (2011)
Test	Score
Overall	5 /5 stars
Frontal offset	14.34/16
Side impact	16/16
Pole	2/2
Seat belt reminders	3/3
Whiplash protection	Not Assessed
Pedestrian protection	Adequate
Electronic stability control	Standard

==== Euro NCAP ====
Euro NCAP V60:

- Overall =
- Adult occupant = 94%
- Child occupant = 82%
- Pedestrian = 64%

==== Insurance Institute for Highway Safety (IIHS) ====
IIHS S60:
Moderate overlap frontal offset	Good
Small overlap frontal offset	Good^{1}
Side impact	Good
Roof strength	Good^{2}

^{1} vehicle structure rated "Good"
^{2} strength-to-weight ratio: 4.95

==== NHTSA ====
2013 S60 AWD NHTSA
Overall:	5/5 stars
Frontal Driver:	5/5 stars
Frontal Passenger:	5/5 stars
Side Driver:	5/5 stars
Side Passenger:	5/5 stars
Side Pole Driver:	5/5 stars
Rollover:	5/5 stars

== Third generation (2018) ==
Volvo S60 (third generation)
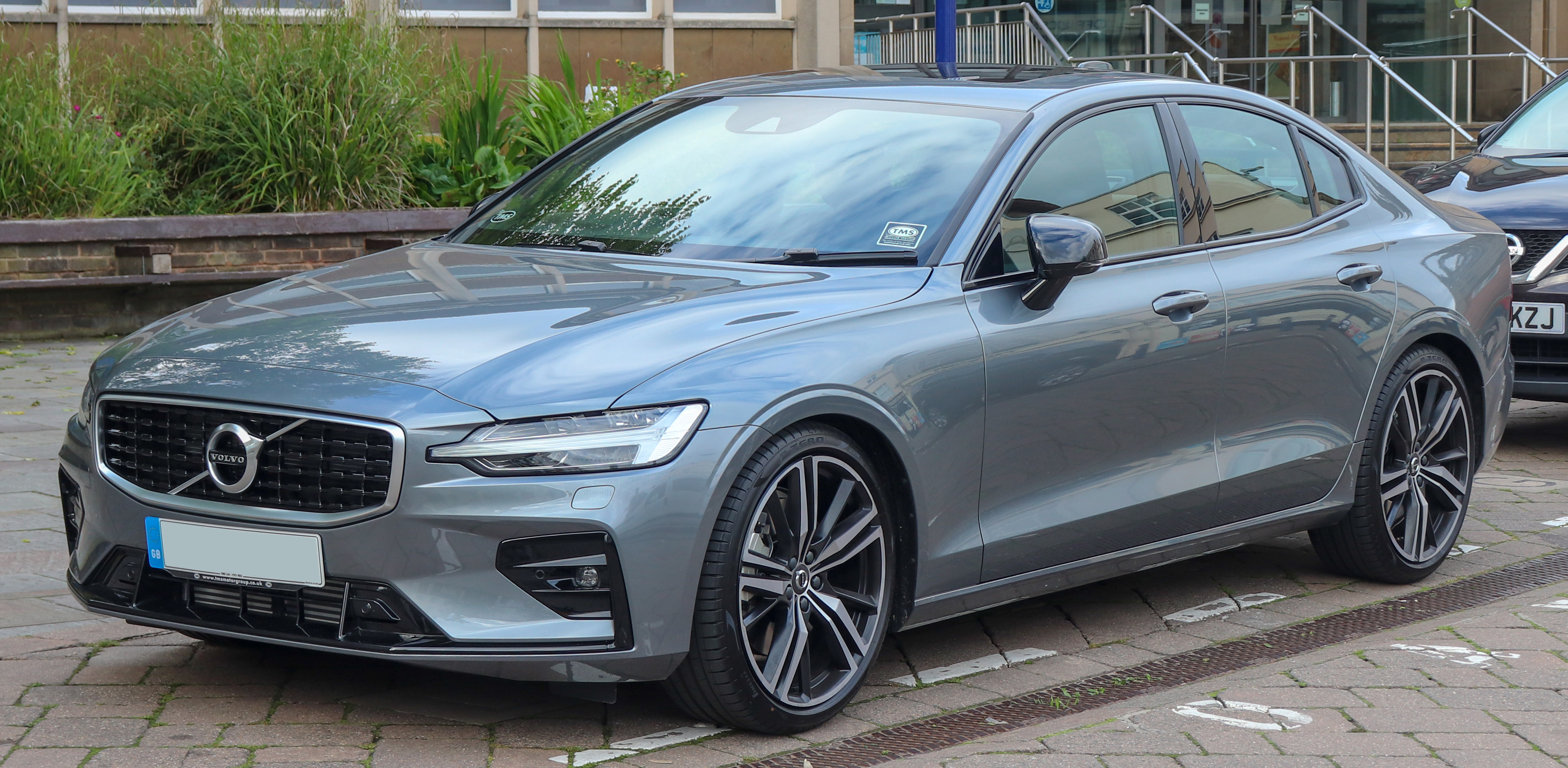

Overview
- Production: 2018–2024 (North America and Europe); 2018–present (China)
- Model years: 2019–2025 (North America and Europe); 2019–present (China and select Asia-Pacific countries)
- Assembly: United States: Ridgeville, South Carolina (VCCH); India: Bengaluru (Volvo Trucks); Malaysia: Shah Alam (VCMM; 2020); China: Daqing (DVCM)
- Designer: T. Jon Mayer

Body and chassis
- Class: Compact executive car
- Platform: Scalable Product Architecture (SPA)
- Related: Volvo V60 II

Powertrain
- Engine: Petrol: 2.0 L VEP4 T5 turbo I4; 2.0 L VEP4 T6 twincharged I4; Hybrid: 2.0 L VEP4 T6 TE twincharged I4; 2.0 L VEP4 T8 TE twincharged I4
- Electric motor: Permanent magnet synchronous (T6/T8 Twin Engine)
- Transmission: 8-speed Aisin TG-81SC automatic; 8-speed Aisin TG-81SD automatic
- Hybrid drivetrain: Plug-in hybrid (Twin Engine); Mild hybrid
- Battery: 9.2 kWh (33 MJ) lithium-ion battery; 18.8 kWh (68 MJ) lithium-ion battery

Dimensions
- Wheelbase: 2,872 mm (113.1 in)
- Length: 4,761 mm (187.4 in)
- Width: 1,850 mm (72.8 in)
- Height: 1,431 mm (56.3 in)
- Curb weight: 1,680–2,020 kg (3,700–4,450 lb)

The third-generation Volvo S60 entered production in 2018 for the 2019 model, going on sale in October 2018. With sales of three-box sedans steadily losing ground to SUV variants (and in Volvo's case, to the V60 as well), US production ended in June 2024 and sales came to an end in North America and Europe.

=== Production ===
Production began in September 2018 and ended in June 2024 in Ridgeville, South Carolina. Production continued in China for Asian markets as well as Australia, places were traditional sedans still find buyers. The third generation of the Volvo S60 is the first Volvo manufactured in the United States. A 2.3-million-square-foot (210,000 m^{2}) plant built over 60,000 vehicles per year for both American and export markets. Capacity can go up to 100,000 vehicles per year if demand calls for it. The facility is Volvo's seventh, joining two European, three Chinese, and one Malaysian location. As of 2022, the plant employed nearly 1,500 people.

=== Trim levels ===
The S60 is available in Core, Plus, Ultimate, and Polestar trim levels depending on the sales market. Other than the Polestar, T6 Momentum, and T6 R-Design trims, all S60 models can be traditionally purchased or leased. Polestar models were offered solely through Volvo's Care by Volvo monthly subscription plan for the 2019 model year for the United States market.

==== United Kingdom ====
In the United Kingdom, the S60 was offered as R-Design, R-Design Plus, Inscription, Inscription Plus, and Polestar Engineered, then from 2020, Plus and Ultimate.

=== Engines ===
The S60 comes with four engine options: the t4, 187hp/190hp, the T5, which features a turbocharged 2.0-liter four-cylinder sending 252 hp (188 kW; 255 PS) to the front wheels (or all four wheels in some markets as an option), the T6, which features a Twincharged 2.0 I4, sending 316 hp (236 kW; 320 PS) to all 4 wheels, and the T8, a performance-oriented plug-in hybrid which combines a turbocharged four-cylinder and an electric motor, replacing the supercharger from the T6 at the rear, sending a combined 400 hp (298 kW; 406 PS) to all four wheels. The T8 produces 472 lb⋅ft (640 N⋅m; 65 kg⋅m) and with a 11.6-kWh battery pack, it gets a range of 22 miles (35 km) on the electric model. In 2022, the T8 hybrid engine was updated by removing its supercharger, which with its electrical engine, produces max 455 horsepower (339 kW; 461 PS) combined and 523 pound-feet (709 N⋅m; 72 kg⋅m) torque. Battery pack was also increased to 18.8-kWh battery pack which improves the range to 41 miles (66 km). In 2023, Volvo removed non-hybrid engines as propulsion offerings for the United States market, meaning mild hybrids were the base engine option.

=== Safety ===
Standard gear on all S60s includes an improved City Safety collision avoidance system based on Volvo's Vision 2020. The system can now help the driver do an evasive maneuver and can detect and mitigate oncoming vehicles at intersections. An optional Pilot Assist system is equipped into the model.

ANCAP test results* Volvo V60 T5 & B5 variants only (2018, aligned with Euro NCAP)
Test	Points	%
Overall:	5 /5 stars	
Adult occupant:	36.5	96%
Child occupant:	43.2	88%
Pedestrian:	35.7	74%
Safety assist:	10.1	77%

The S60 was one of the IIHS's Top Safety Picks for 2020, and earned Top Safety Pick+ for 2021 and 2022.

2019 Volvo S60 IIHS Ratings
Category	Rating
Small overlap front	Good
Moderate overlap front	Good
Side impact	Good
Roof strength	Good
Head restraints & seats	Good

=== Gallery ===
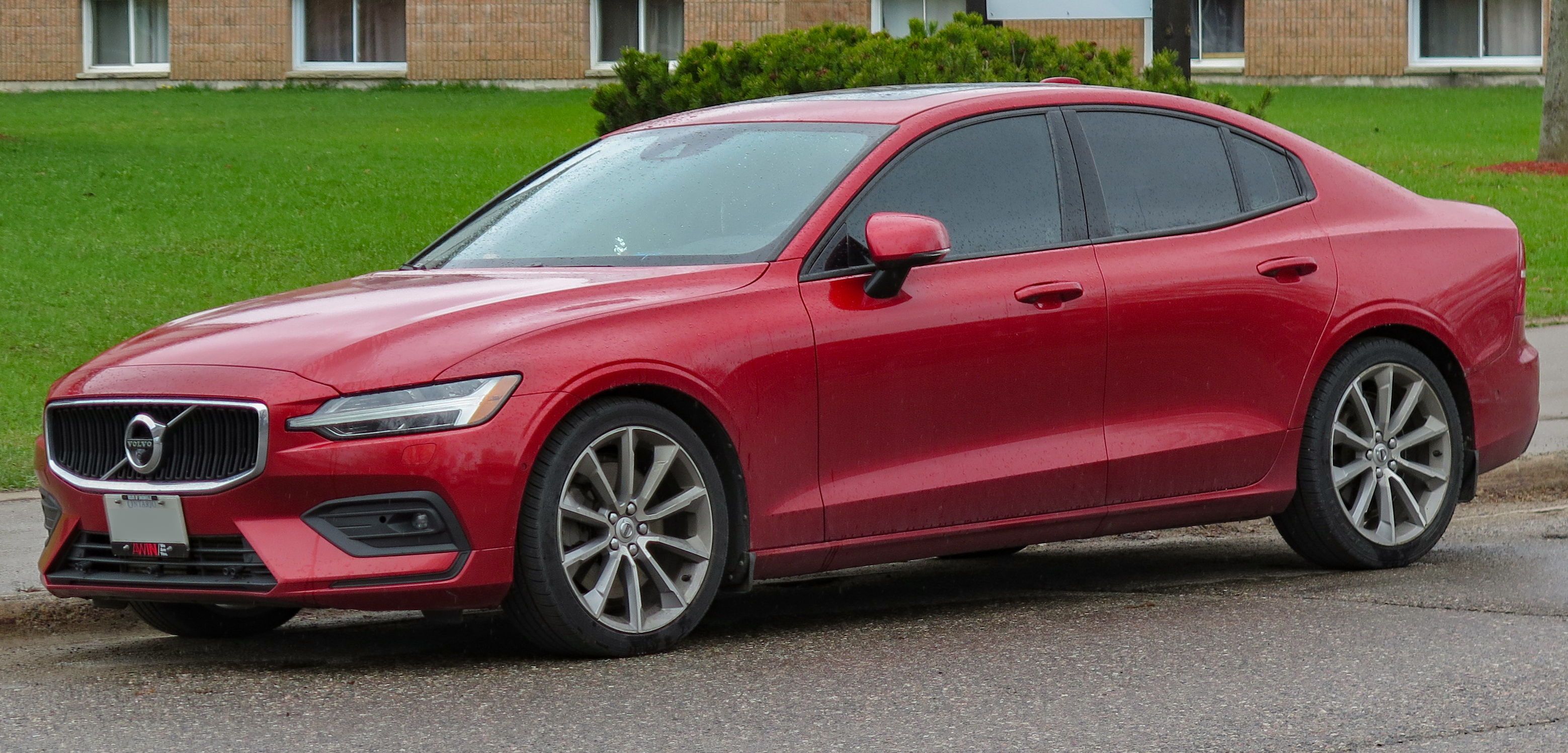
S60 Momentum T6 (US)

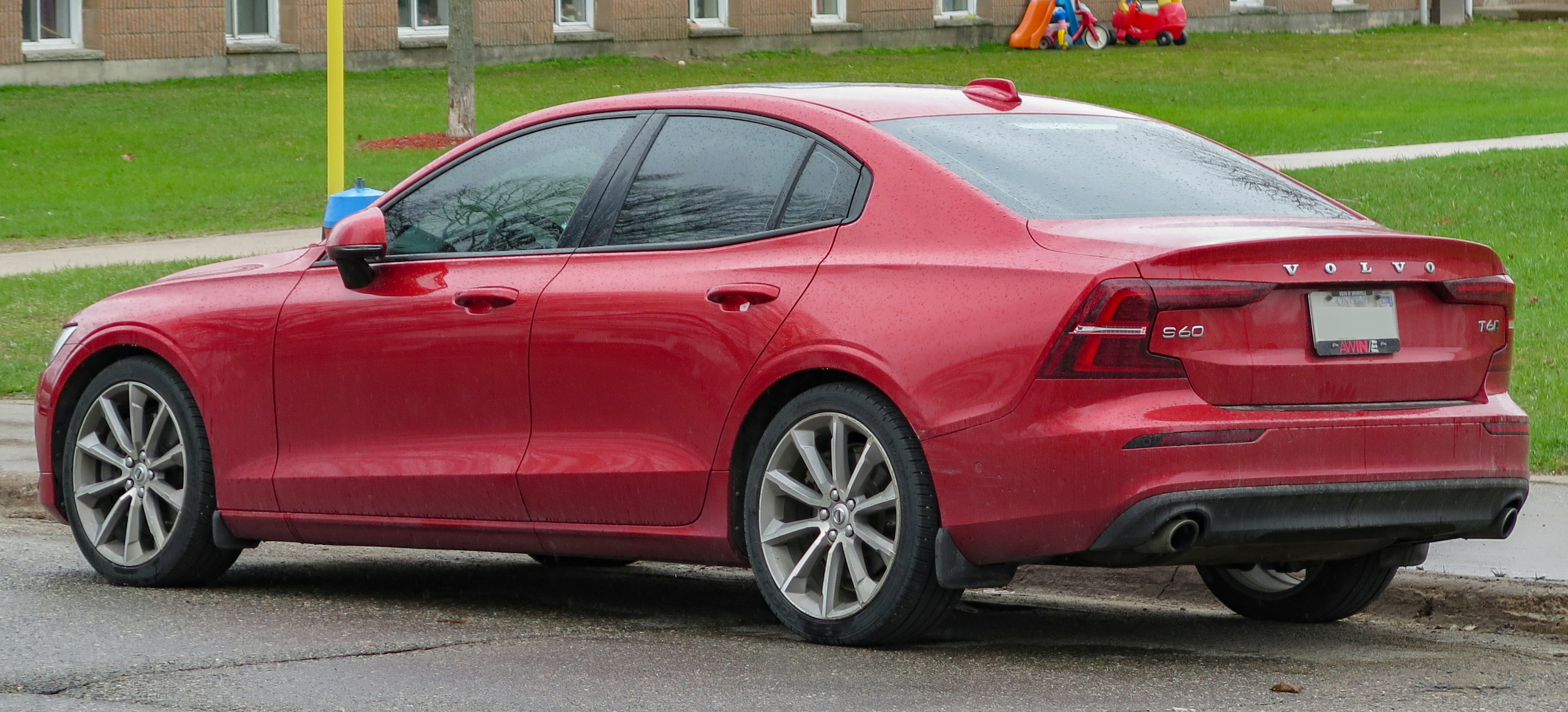
S60 Momentum T6 (US)

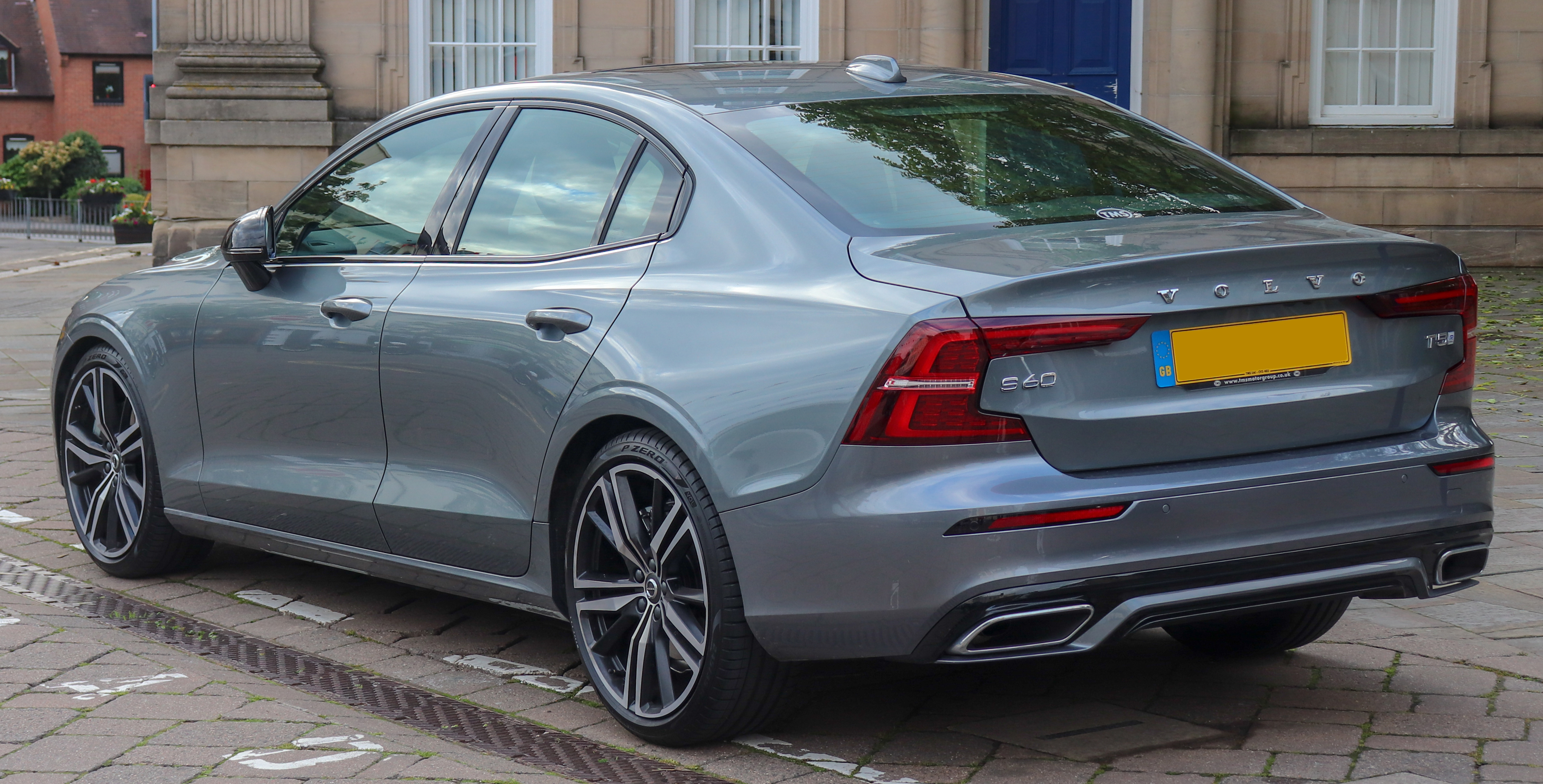
Volvo S60 R-Design Edition (UK)

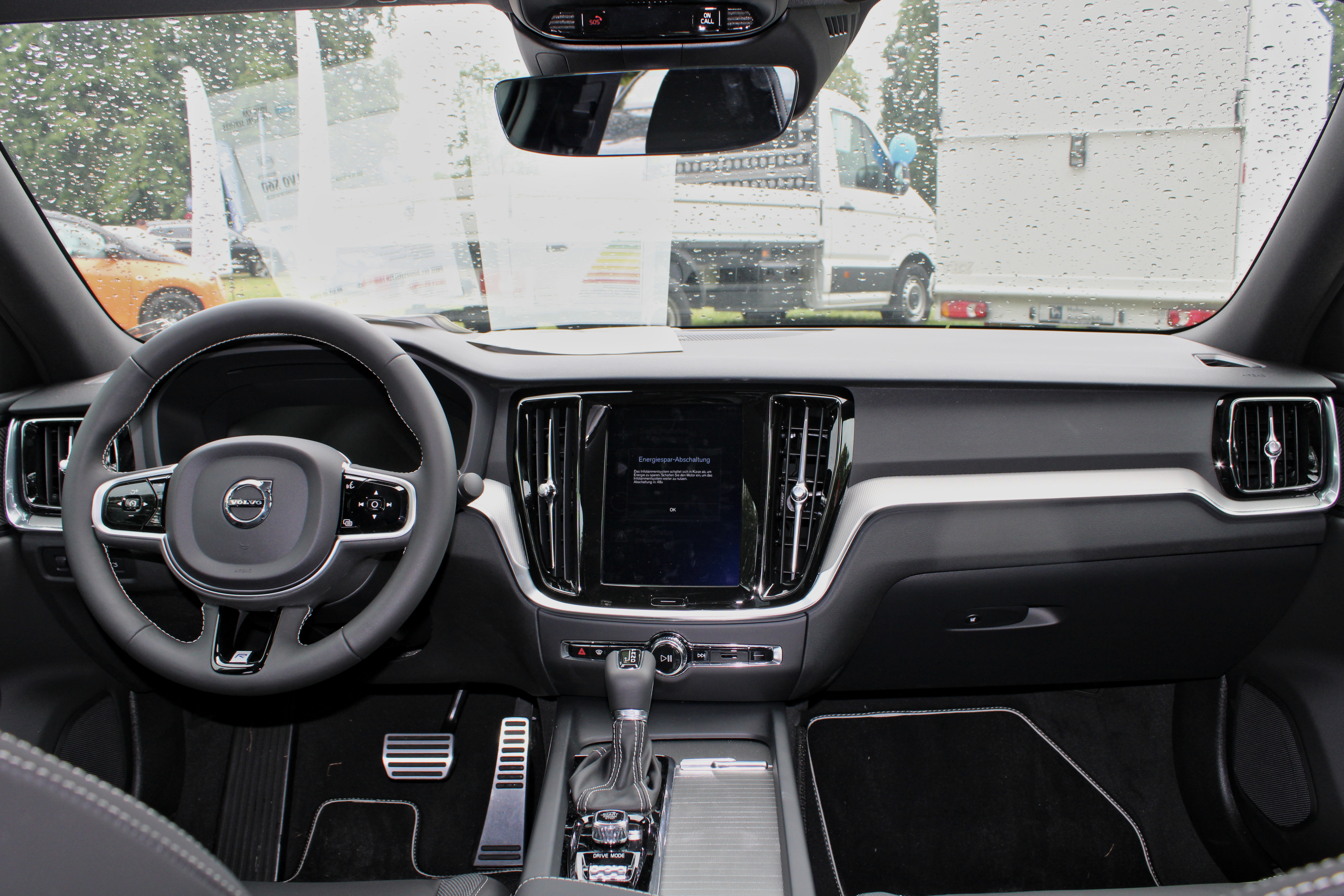
Interior

== British land speed record ==
On 14 and 15 October 2000, the first-generation S60 T5 broke 18 British land speed records (including the highest average speed over a 24-hour period) for a Production Car class D (2000–3000cc) at 135.10 miles per hour (217.42 km/h) at the Millbrook Proving Ground, in Bedfordshire, UK. A joint project by Volvo and Prodrive and covered by Channel 4's Driven and Car magazine.

The car was standard except for safety modifications such as a roll cage, exterior cut out switch, a modified fuel tank and additional head support to allow the drivers (BTCC drivers Anthony Reid, Rickard Rydell, John Cleland and Alain Menu as well as various Car journalists and Channel 4's Mike Brewer) to rest their neck during the 2-hour gaps between pit stops. Each pitstop included a driver change, refuel and tyre changes due to the extreme stresses being placed on the front outside tyre.

The following records were broken:

- 50 mile standing start: 148.59 mph
- 100 mile standing start: 147.00 mph
- 200 mile standing start: 144.05 mph
- 500 mile standing start: 141.53 mph
- 1000 miles standing start: 140.79 mph
- 2000 miles standing start: 137.25 mph
- 50 kilometre standing start: 147.39 mph
- 200 kilometre standing start: 145.89 mph
- 500 kilometre standing start: 141.63 mph
- 1000 kilometre standing start: 140.79 mph
- 2000 kilometre standing start: 139.75 mph
- 5000 kilometre standing start: 135.75 mph
- Flying five kilometres: 152.02 mph
- Average speed over one hour: 145.63 mph
- Average speed over three hours: 141.62 mph
- Average speed over six hours: 141.58 mph
- Average speed over 12 hours: 138.49 mph
- Average speed over 24 hours: 135.10 mph

== Motorsport ==
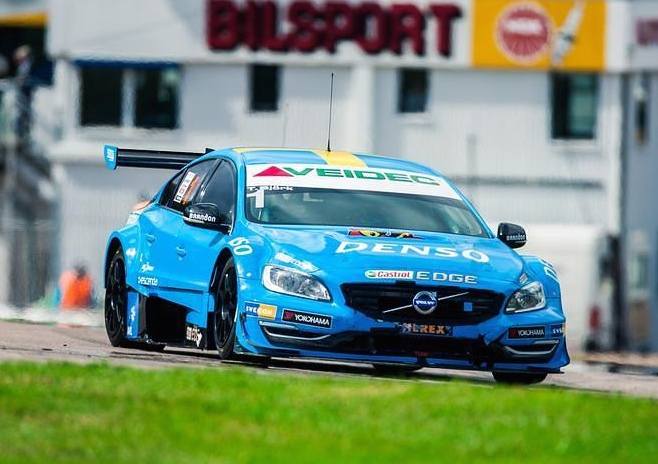
Thed Björk driving an S60 entered by Polestar Racing in the 2014 Scandinavian Touring Car Championship.

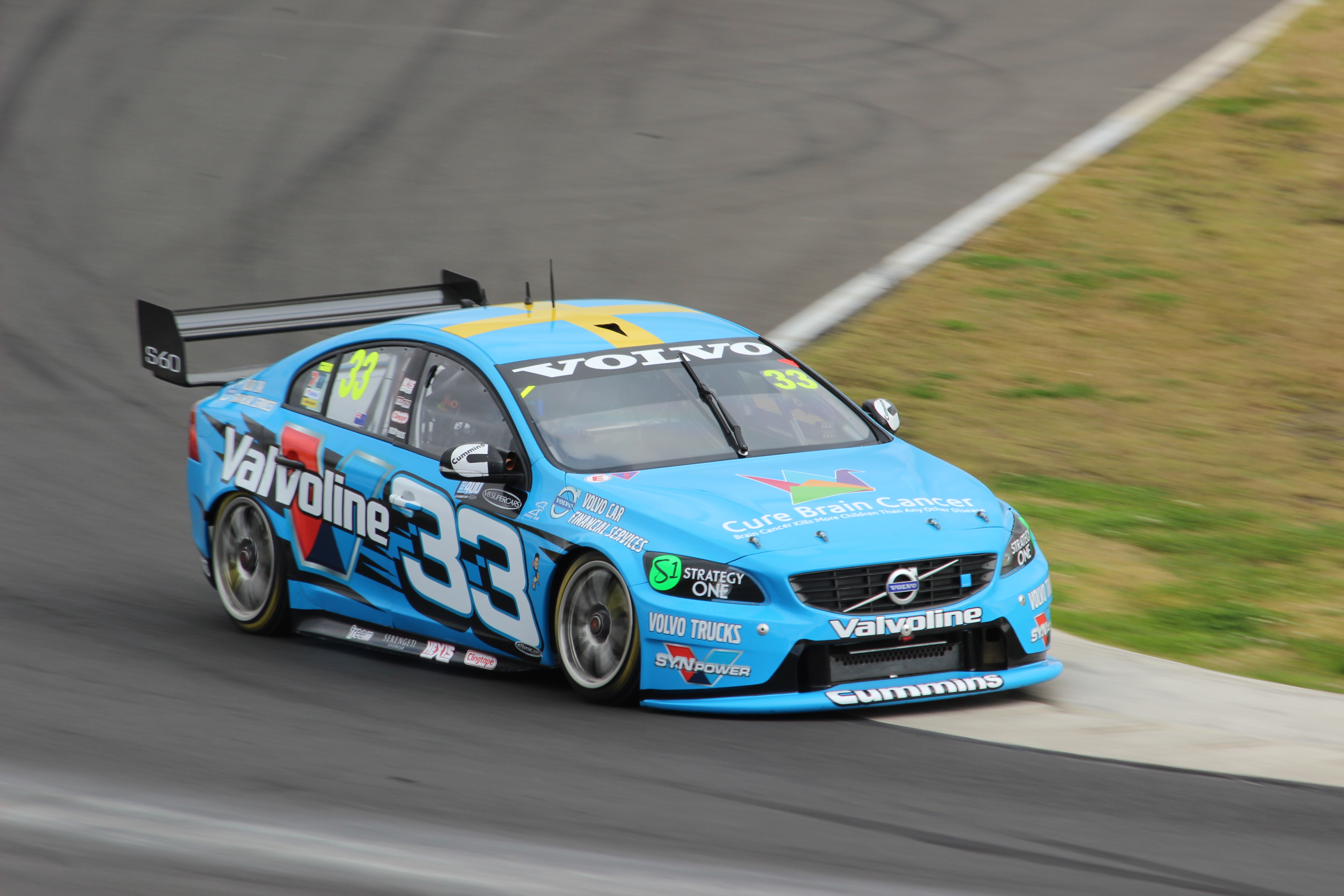
Scott McLaughlin driving an S60 entered by Garry Rogers Motorsport in the 2014 International V8 Supercars Championship.

The S60 has been raced in a range of championships across Europe, North America and Australia.

=== Europe ===
Volvo regularly entered the S60 in the Swedish Touring Car Championship, where it finished 2nd in the drivers' championship twice and won the manufacturers' title once. The S60 continued to be raced after the formation of the Scandinavian Touring Car Championship, a merger of the Swedish and Danish touring car championships. Thed Björk won three consecutive titles from 2013 to 2015, and Rikard Göransson won the championship in 2016, driving an S60 prepared by Polestar Racing.

From 2002 to 2007 there was an S60 one-make racing series as a support series to the Swedish Touring Car Championship known as the S60 Challenge Cup, using 26 factory-modified S60s.

An S60 was driven by Robert Dahlgren in the Swedish round of the 2007 World Touring Car Championship.

In 2016 the S60 made its return to the WTCC with Fredrik Ekblom and Thed Björk driving for Polestar Cyan Racing. Their 2017 lineup consists of Thed Björk, Nestor Girolami and Nick Catsburg.

=== North America ===
The first generation S60 made its competitive debut in 2006, racing in the Speed World Challenge GT class. The second-generation model was introduced for the 2009 season. In 2010, its programme was expanded to include the SCCA Pro Racing World Challenge, where it won both the drivers' championship, for factory driver Randy Pobst, his fourth, and manufacturers' championships in the GT class. The programme was expanded again in 2011 to include the Pirelli World Challenge.

=== Australia ===
Volvo competed in the V8 Supercars Championship with two rear wheel drive V8 B8444S powered S60s between 2014 and 2016 with Garry Rogers Motorsport highlighted by a debut 2nd place at the Adelaide 500, a last second overtake to steal a race win at the Phillip Island Circuit, and third for Scott McLaughlin in the 2016 series driver standings.

== Sales and marketing ==
S60 and V60 Sales
Calendar year	US S60	Canada S60	Sweden S60	China S60L	Global S60	Global V60
2010	1,437	208	2,068	—N/a	14,786	4,609
2011	21,282	1,519	3,395	—N/a	68,330	49,820
2012	23,356	1,525	13,997†	—N/a	64,746	53,037
2013	23,210	1,374	14,174†	—N/a	61,646‡	54,666
2014	20,457		14,444†	7,275	67,623	61,977
2015	16,993			24,960	64,078	61,341
2016	14,789			29,566	61,941	51,911
2017	12,454			26,986	54,197	60,637
2018	7,583			19,350	40,499	54,095
2019	17,526			15,460	42,795	68,577
2020	11,946			26,348	52,251	64,912
2021	10,550			26,129	49,244	56,036
2022	6,151			21,643	39,504	32,077
2023	10,357			20,823	40,153	30,438
2024	13,029			23,123	43,951	33,138
2025	940			22,652		

† Combined total for S60 and V60. ‡ Includes 67 sales of the S60L long-wheelbase version.

=== Product placement ===
Volvo vehicles, including the S60, appeared in the Twilight film series as part of a marketing partnership between Volvo and the franchise. Contemporary reporting noted that the exposure increased visibility for Volvo among younger audiences.

== See also ==
- Volvo V70, estate car bearing the same design an underpinnings as the first generation S60
- Volvo V60, estate car bearing the same design and underpinnings as second and third generation S60s
