= Turning assistant =

Driver-assistance system

Turning assistant is an advanced driver-assistance system introduced in 2015.

The system monitors opposing traffic when turning across traffic at low speeds. In critical situation, it brakes the car. This is a common scenario at busy city crossings as well as on highways, where the speed limits are higher.

== Operation ==
A turning assistant monitors oncoming traffic while the driver is preparing to turn across traffic. On some vehicles, monitoring begins when the driver activates the direction indicator, using sensors such as radar, a front camera and, in some models, lidar. At low speeds, the system may warn the driver or apply the brakes to prevent or mitigate a traffic collision with an oncoming vehicle.

== Vehicles ==
- 2016 Audi Q7: Turning Assistant
- 2015 Volvo XC90: City Safety (with auto brake in intersections)
