= Volvo XC90 =

Mid-size luxury crossover SUV

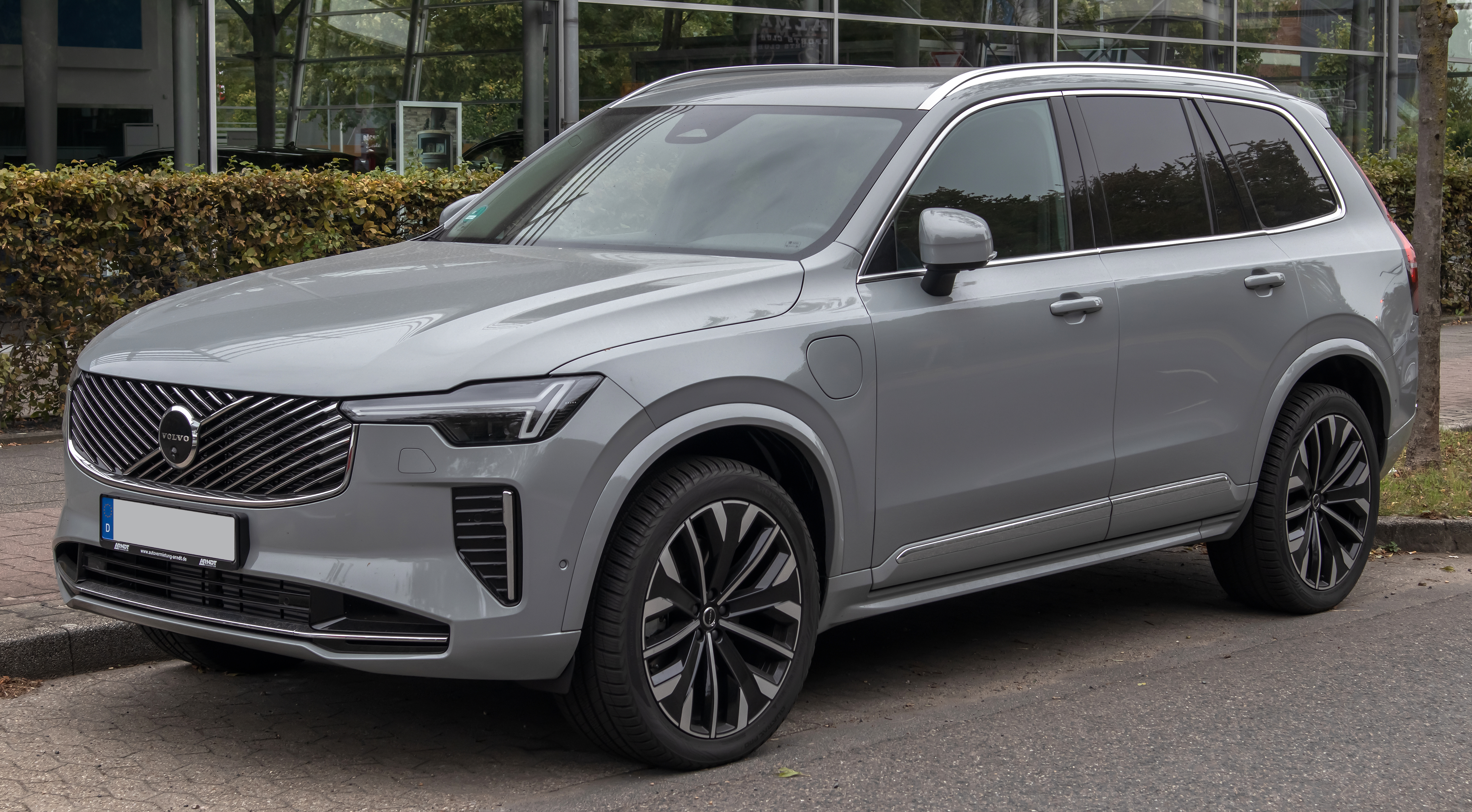
- 2025 Volvo XC90

Overview
- Manufacturer: Volvo Cars
- Production: 2002–present

Body and chassis
- Class: Mid-size luxury crossover SUV
- Body style: 5-door SUV
- Layout: Front-engine, front-wheel-drive or four-wheel drive

The Volvo XC90 is a mid-size luxury SUV manufactured and marketed by Volvo Cars since 2002 and in its second generation.

The first generation was introduced at the 2002 North American International Auto Show and used the Volvo P2 platform shared with the first generation Volvo S80 and other large Volvo cars. It was manufactured at Volvo's Torslandaverken in Sweden. Volvo moved production equipment of the first generation to China and ended Swedish production at the end of 2014, renaming the car as the Volvo XC Classic (or Volvo XC90 Classic).

At the end of 2014, the second generation XC90 was introduced. It is based on a new global platform, the Scalable Product Architecture (SPA). Both generations of the XC90 have won Motor Trend's SUV of the Year award in their debuts.

In late 2022, the electric-only EX90 was introduced as the successor of the XC90. However, in September 2024, Volvo launched the second facelift of XC90, and stated that both models would be sold together for the foreseeable future.

== First generation (2002) ==
First generation
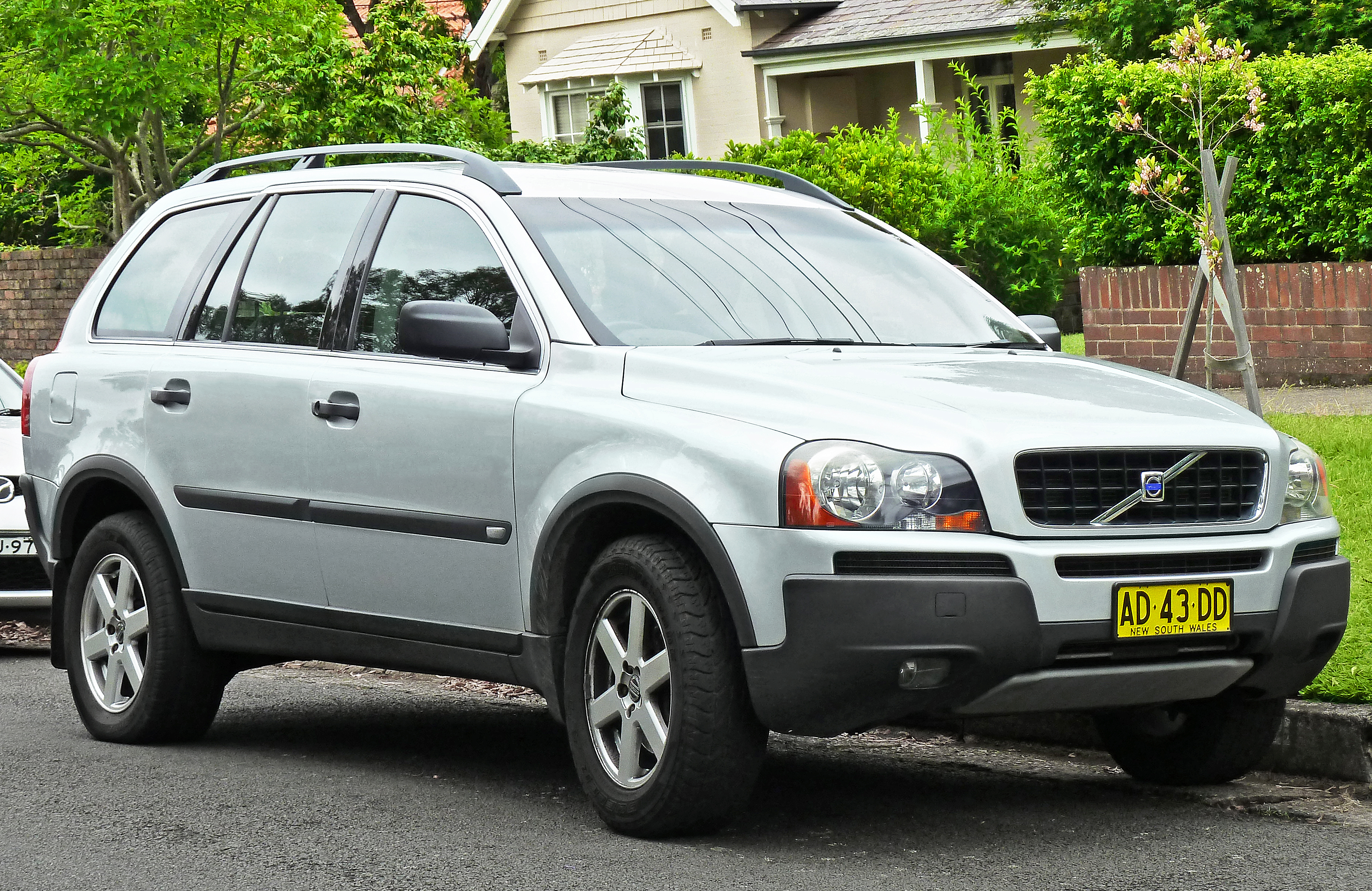
- Volvo XC90 pre-facelift

Overview
- Also called: Volvo XC Classic (China)
- Production: August 2002–2014 (XC90); 2014–2016 (XC Classic)
- Model years: 2003–2014 (XC90); 2014–2016 (XC Classic)
- Assembly: Sweden: Torslanda (Torslandaverken); China: Daqing (DVCM); Malaysia: Shah Alam (SMA)
- Designer: Doug Frasher (1999)

Body and chassis
- Platform: Volvo P2 platform

Powertrain
- Engine: Petrol: 2.5 L B5254T2 turbo I5; 2.9 L B6294T twin-turbo I6; 3.2 L SI6 I6; 4.4 L B8444S V8; Diesel: 2.4 L D5244T4/T5 turbo I5
- Transmission: 6-speed Volvo M66 manual; 4-speed GM 4T65 AWD automatic; 5-speed Aisin AW55-50/51SN automatic; 6-speed Aisin TF-80SC automatic

Dimensions
- Wheelbase: 2003–2004 &; 2007–2016: 2,857 mm (112.5 in); 2005–2006: 2,859 mm (112.6 in)
- Length: 2003–2006: 4,821 mm (189.8 in); 2007–2016: 4,807 mm (189.3 in)
- Width: 2003–2012: 1,909 mm (75.2 in); 2013–2016: 1,935 mm (76.2 in)
- Height: 1,784 mm (70.2 in)
- Curb weight: 2,020–2,160 kg (4,450–4,760 lb)

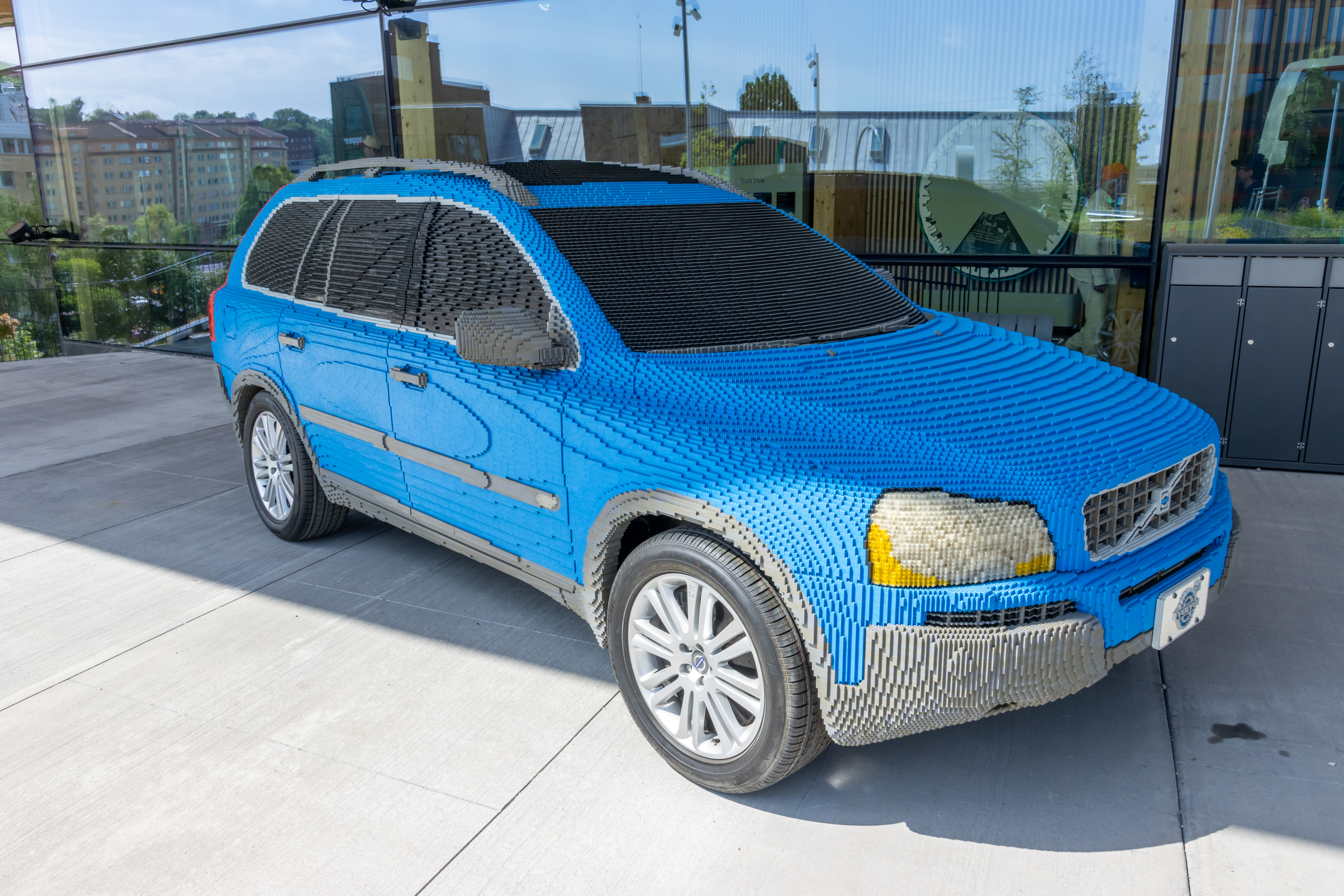
Lego XC90 at World of Volvo

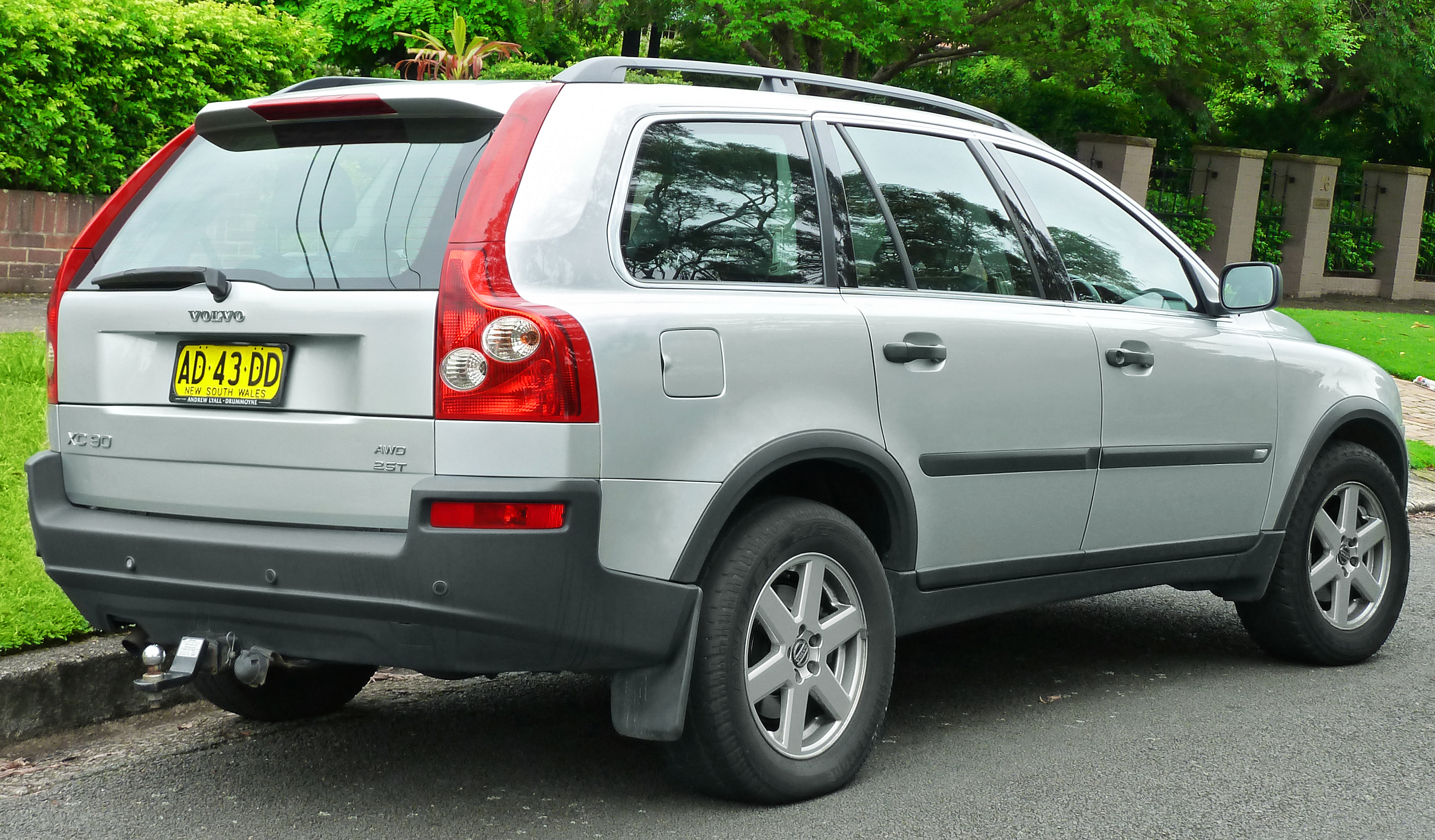
Volvo XC90 pre-facelift

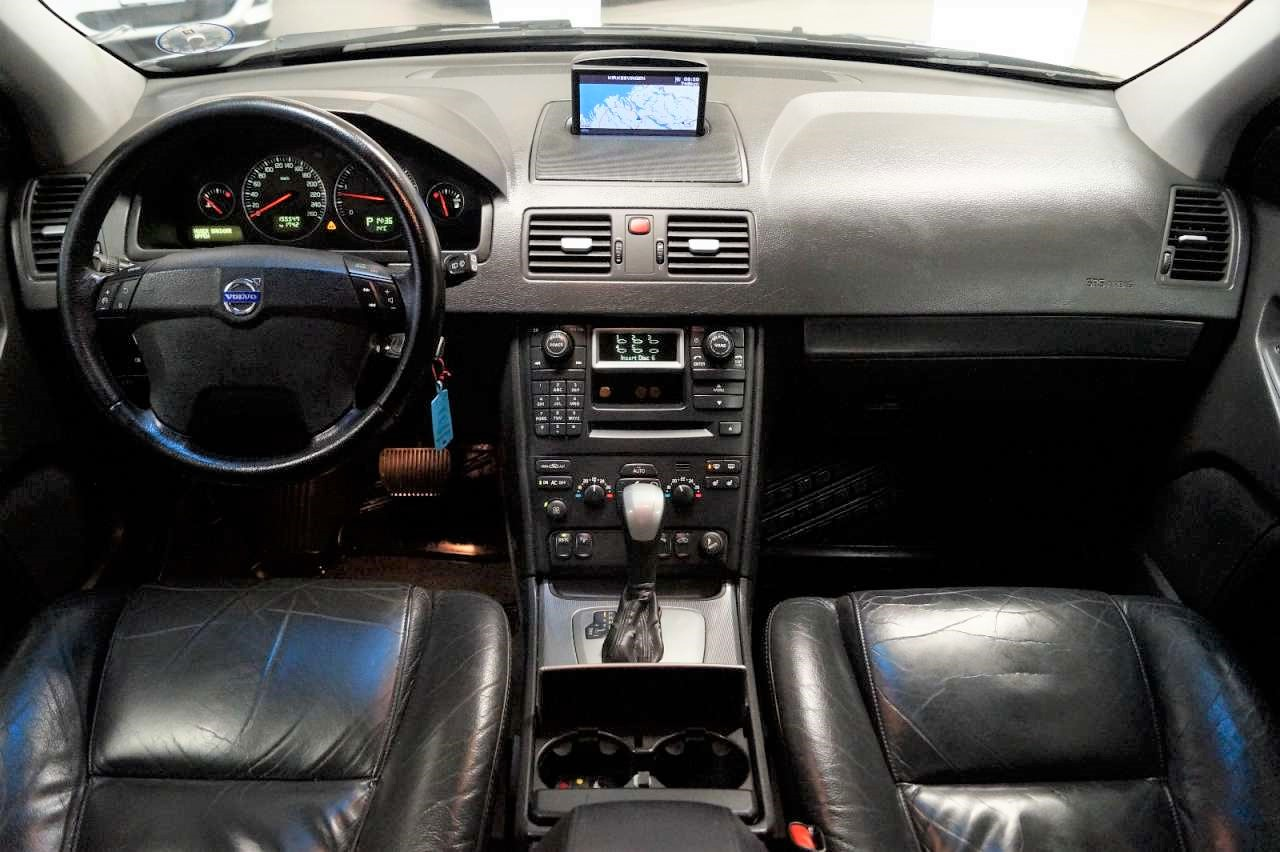
Interior

In January 2001, Volvo debuted its Adventure Concept Car at the North American International Auto Show, to gauge reaction to the styling and features of its upcoming SUV. In November 2001, Volvo released a teaser image showing the frontal styling of the production version, named the XC90. Notable as Volvo's first SUV model, the styling of the XC90 recalled the concept. In January 2002, the full XC90 unveiling occurred, at the North American International Auto Show. Production began in August 2002, after Volvo's traditional mid-year shutdown, with the first XC90s coming out of the Torslanda factory in Sweden.

At its North American launch for the 2003 model year, the XC90 was presented with a choice of two trim levels, the 2.5 T and the T6. The 2.5 T was the entry level version and offered a 2.5-litre B5254T2 "T5" turbocharged inline-five engine, producing 208 hp (155 kW; 211 PS) and 236 lb⋅ft (320 N⋅m) mated to an Aisin co-developed five-speed AW55-50/51 automatic. The T6 offered a 2.9-litre B6294T twin-turbocharged inline-six with 268 hp (200 kW; 272 PS) and 280 lb⋅ft (380 N⋅m) mated to a GM-sourced, Volvo-modified four-speed 4T65EV/GT automatic. While the 2.5T came standard with front-wheel drive, a Haldex Traction all-wheel drive (AWD) system was optional. The T6 was offered only with the AWD system.

A Yamaha V8 engine was added in 2005, whose 4.4-litre Volvo B8444S engine produced 232 kW (315 PS; 311 hp) and 325 lb⋅ft (441 N⋅m) of torque. Volvo sold just over 40,000 XC90 units in North America that year.

The XC90 won the North American Car of the Year award and Motor Trend magazine's Sport/Utility of the Year for 2003.

Jeremy Clarkson, ex-host of Top Gear, has previously owned three XC90s, and claims they were designed by "someone who must've had children due to its practicality."

=== Facelifts ===
==== 2007 update ====
The XC90 was freshened for 2007 with a facelifted front and rear and a revised interior. The 175 kW (235 hp) 3.2 L SI6 straight-6 engine replaced the 155 kW (208 hp) B524T2 straight-5 in the base model for the US market. The 2007 XC90 debuted in April 2006 at the New York Auto Show.

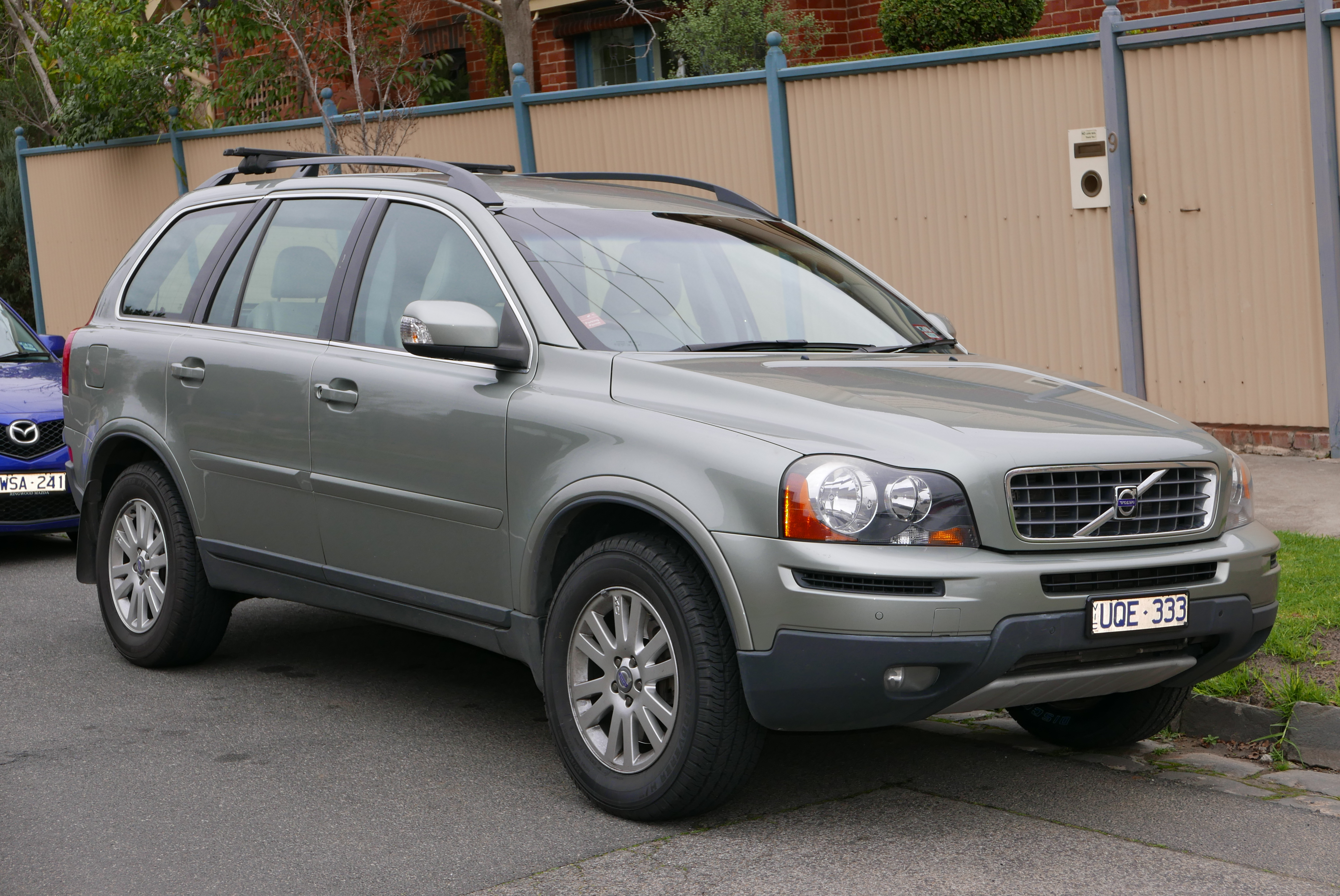
2007 update

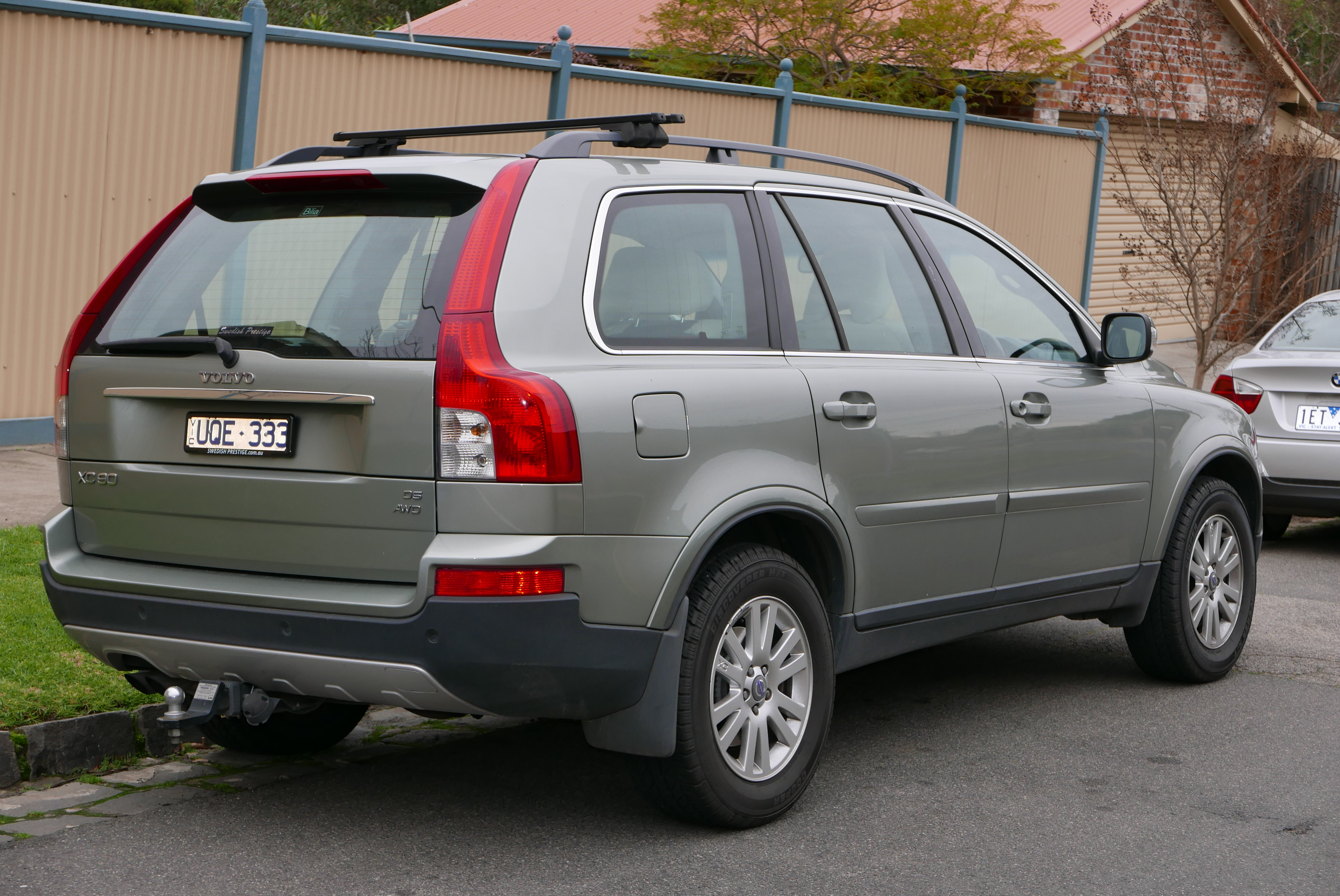
2007 update

==== 2009, 2010, and 2012 updates ====
For model year (MY) 2009, the XC90 received a new rear logo, featuring larger lettering with wider spaces between the "VOLVO" letters.

In 2010, all XC90 models received painted wheel arches (previously they were optional). In addition, a new, larger, circular Volvo logo appeared on the front grille.

For MY 2012, new LED tail-lights became available on certain models, although entry-level models retain the previous style. For MY 2013, the XC90 received a cosmetic refresh that included standard LED daytime running lights and taillights, and exterior revisions including body colour bumpers, rocker panels and silver trim replacing black plastic trim.

The refreshed model went on sale during late spring 2012 with a base price of US$40,395 for a front-wheel drive base model. For the 2014 model year the base price is US$39,700.

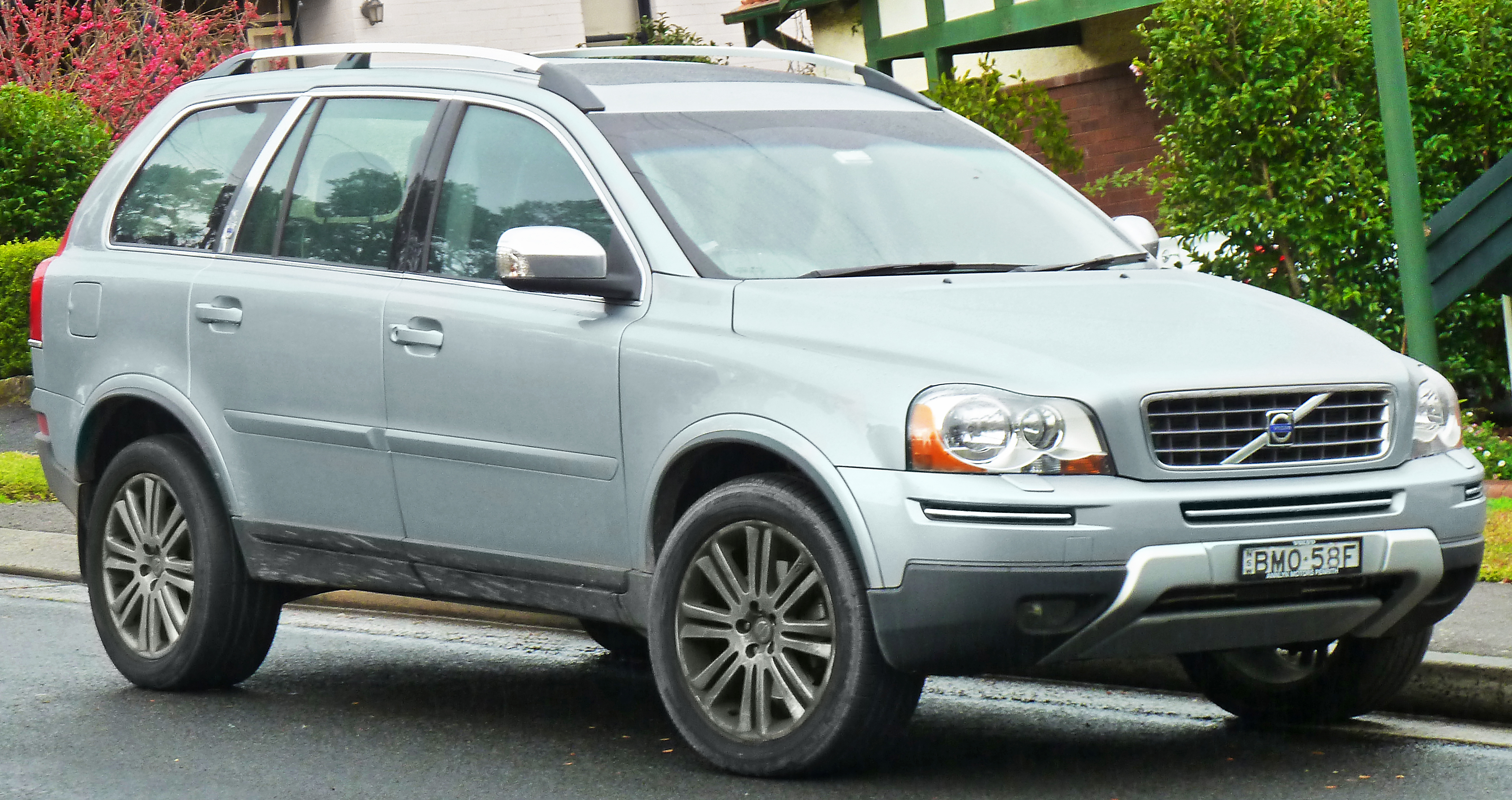
2009 update

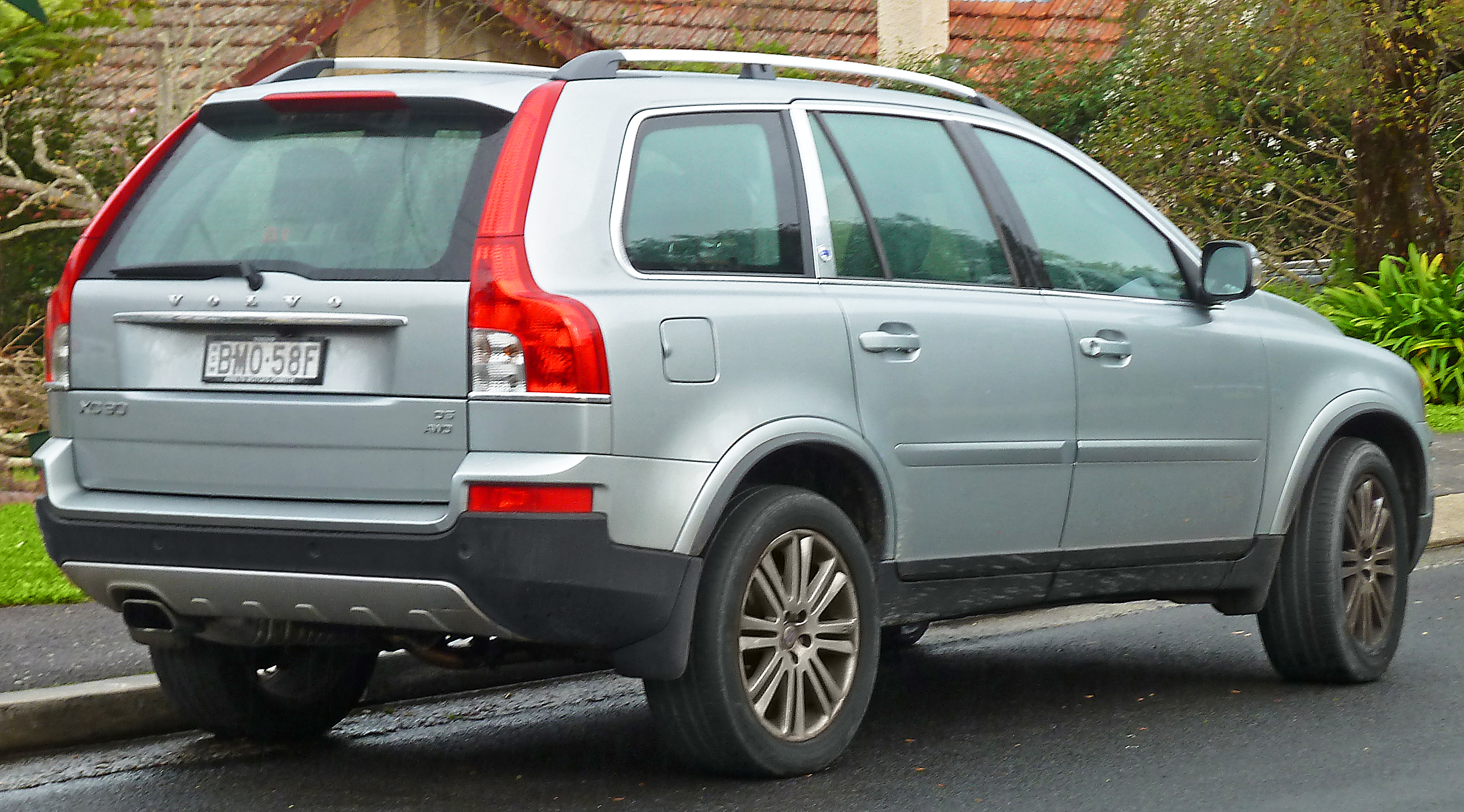
2009 update

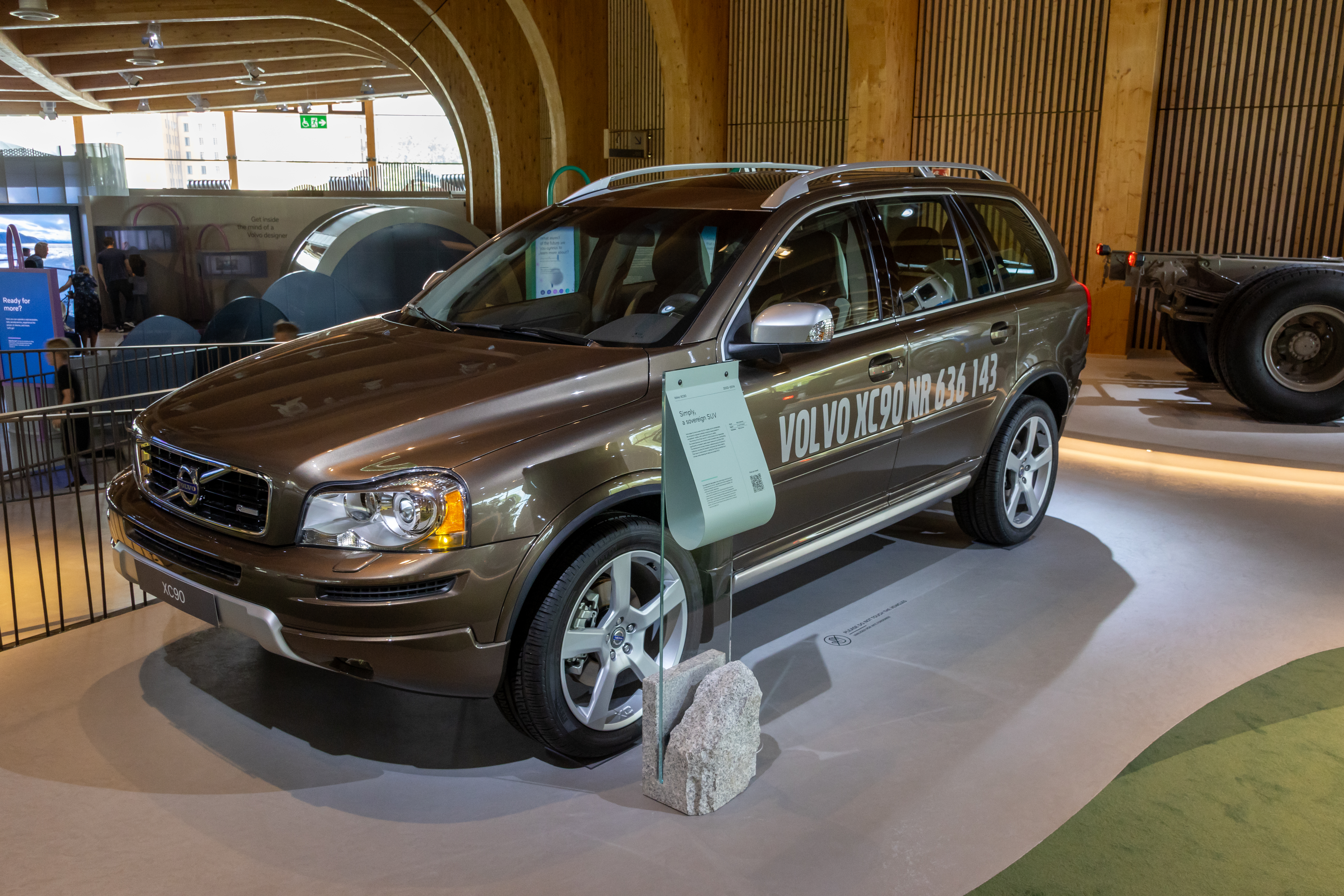
The 636,143th and last XC90 P2 produced in Sweden on display at the World of Volvo museum

=== First generation models ===
==== XC90 Ocean Race ====
In 2001 Volvo became the main sponsor of an around-the-world sailing race, now called the Volvo Ocean Race. The 2005 edition was the first in which all competitors used the same boat known as the Volvo Open 70, a 21.5 m (71 ft) racing yacht made for a crew of 10+ and to be robust enough to survive the open ocean.

In early 2006, Volvo released a special version called Ocean Race Edition. Special blue colour, leather interior with contrast stitching and special interior trim. A total of 800 were made.

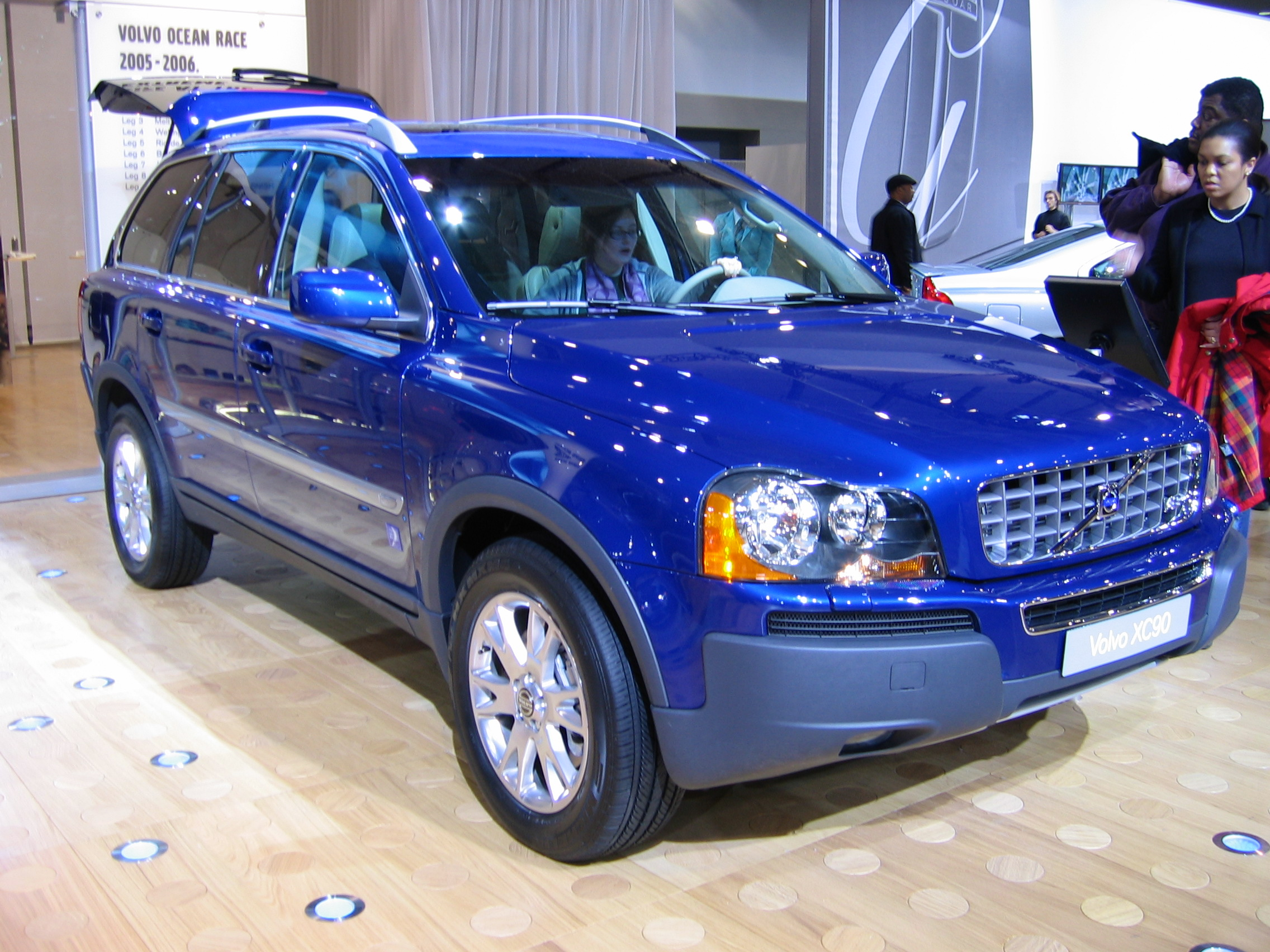
Volvo XC90 Ocean Race

==== XC90 Sport ====
Between 2006 and 2008 Volvo released the Sport trim, which eventually came to bridge the gap between the R series that was available for the S60 and V70, and the R design badge that ultimately usurped the R series.

In the XC90 Sport, the engine was rated at the same power as in the non-Sport XC90s, but the suspension was markedly stiffer due to different shocks and added roll bars, giving it considerably less body roll in curves. Also, the power steering was tweaked to provide a more direct feel at higher speeds. Furthermore, it borrowed the blue background for the odometer in the dash and got 5-spoke Vulcanis rims. The Sport was marketed in Passion Red and also available in Black Sapphire, Titanium Grey and Electric Silver.

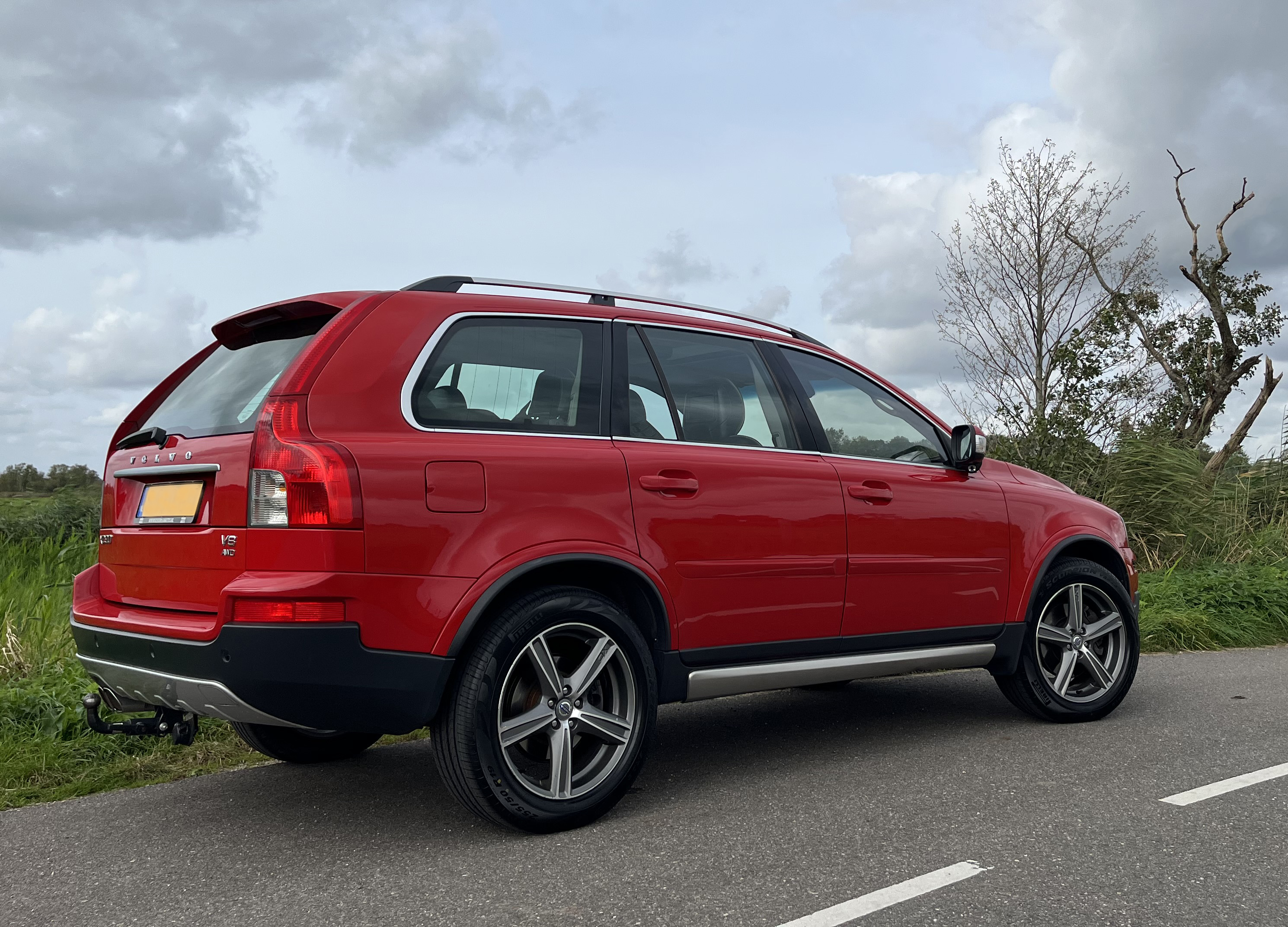
Volvo XC90 Sport, model year 2008

==== XC Classic ====
The first generation Volvo XC90 was sold in China as the XC Classic. It was produced at the Volvo factory located in Daqing, Heilongjiang Province, with necessary tooling shipped from Sweden. Equipment levels were changed compared to the international versions, and only one engine, a 2.5L turbo petrol 5-cylinder engine with 220 hp, was available. All XC Classic models came with AWD as standard and either a 5-speed manual or 5-speed automatic transmission. It was priced below the second generation XC90.

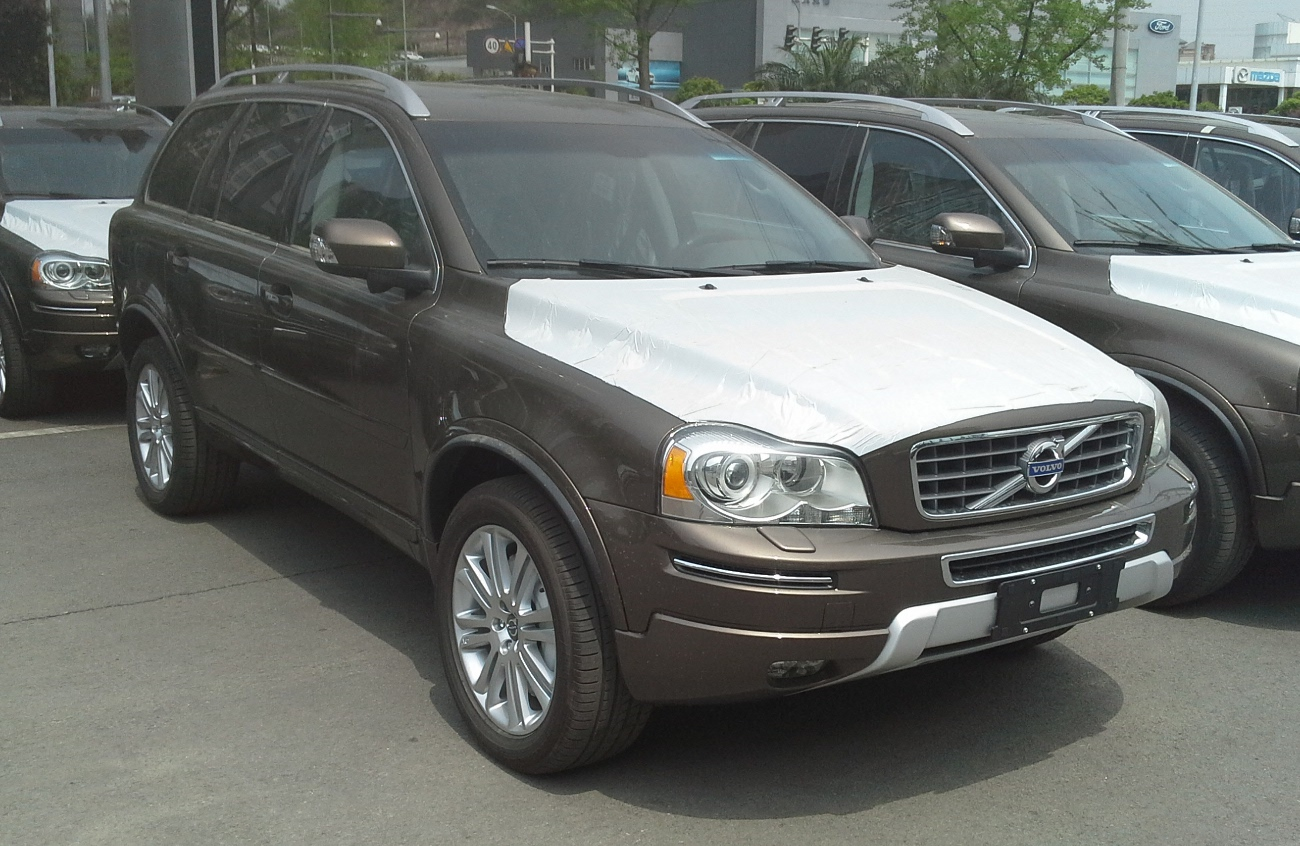
XC Classic (CN)

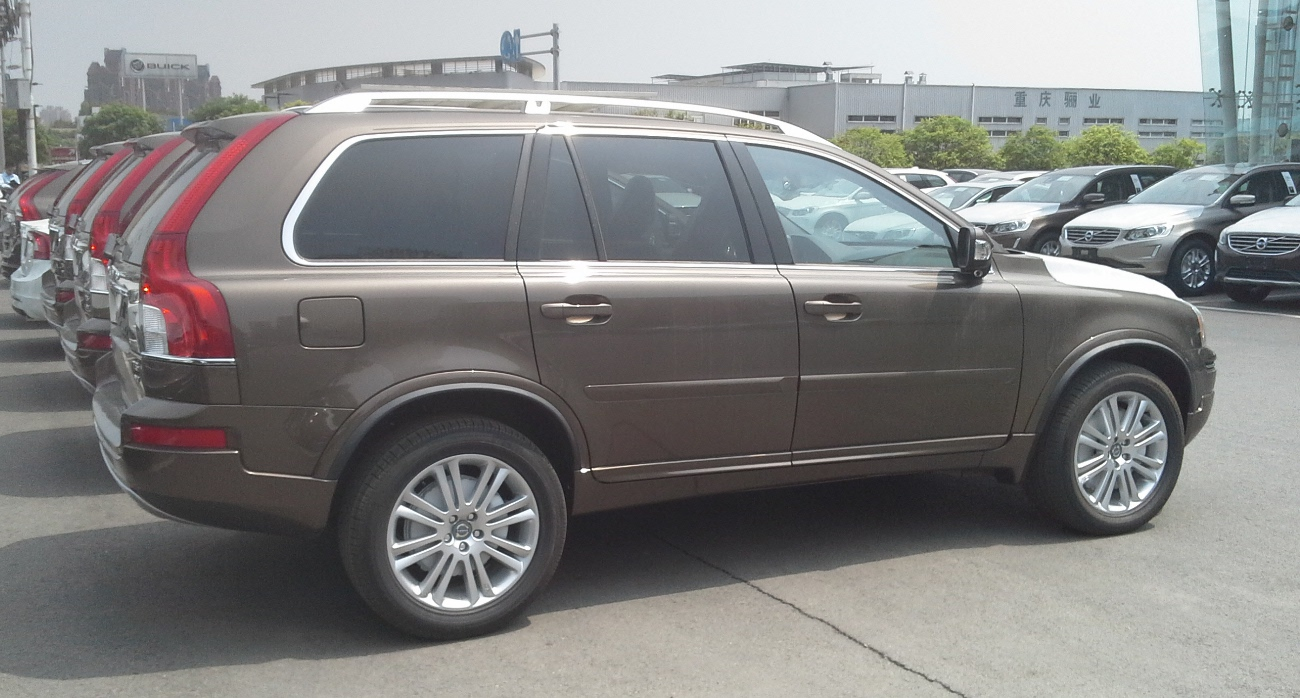
XC Classic (CN)

=== Technical specifications ===
Specification	D3 AWD	D4 FWD	D5 FWD / D5 AWD	D5 FWD / D5 AWD	D5 FWD / D5 AWD	2.5T FWD / 2.5T AWD	3.2 FWD / 3.2 AWD	T6 AWD	V8 AWD
Length	4,811 mm (189.4 in)								
Width	1,900 mm (75 in)								
Height	1,781 mm (70.1 in)								
Wheelbase	2,860 mm (113 in)								
Ground Clearance	231 mm (9.1 in)								
Luggage area volume	249 L								
Seats	5 or 7								
Fuel	Diesel					Petrol			
Year(s)	2009	2013	2003–2004	2005–2011	2012–2014	2003–2006	2007–2014	2003–2005	2005–2011
Curb weight	2,029 kg (4,473 lb)	2,127 kg (4,689 lb)		2,065–2,225 kg (4,553–4,905 lb)	2,029 kg (4,473 lb)	1,976 kg (4,356 lb)	2,025–2,212 kg (4,464–4,877 lb)		2,077 kg (4,579 lb)
Engine	I5 turbo					I5 turbo	I6	I6 twin-turbo	V8
Engine code	D5244T5	D5244T5	D5244T	D5244T4	D5244T18	B5254T2	B6324S	B6294T	B8444S
Displacement (cc)	2,401 cc (146.5 cu in)					2,521 cc (153.8 cu in)	3,192 cc (194.8 cu in)	2,922 cc (178.3 cu in)	4,414 cc (269.4 cu in)
Fuel economy (mixed)	8.1 L/100 km	8.1 L/100Km		8.2–9 L/100Km	8.3 L/100Km	11.2 L/100 km	10.2–19.9 L/100 km		11.0–13.5 L/100 km
Max power output	120 kW (163 PS; 161 bhp)	120 kW (163 PS; 161 bhp)	120 kW (163 PS; 161 bhp)	136 kW (185 PS; 182 bhp)	147 kW (200 PS; 197 bhp)	154 kW (210 PS; 207 bhp)	175–179 kW (238–243 PS; 235–240 bhp)	200 kW (272 PS; 268 bhp)	232 kW (315 PS; 311 bhp)
Max torque	340 N⋅m (251 lb⋅ft) at 1920–2800 rpm	340 N⋅m (251 lb⋅ft) at 1750–3000 rpm	340 N⋅m (251 lb⋅ft) at 1750–3000 rpm	400 N⋅m (295 lb⋅ft) at 2000–2750 rpm	420 N⋅m (310 lb⋅ft) at 1920–2800 rpm	320 N⋅m (236 lb⋅ft) at 1500 rpm	320 N⋅m (236 lb⋅ft) at 3200 rpm	380 N⋅m (280 lb⋅ft) at 1750–3000 rpm	441 N⋅m (325 lb⋅ft) at 1800–5000 rpm
Acceleration 0–100 km/h (0–62 mph) (sec)									
Top speed	190 km/h (118 mph)	190 km/h (118 mph)		195 km/h (121 mph)	204 km/h (127 mph)	210 km/h (130 mph)	190–209 km/h (118–130 mph)	215 km/h (134 mph)	248 km/h (154 mph)
Transmission	Automatic	Automatic		Manual or Automatic	Automatic	Manual or Automatic	Automatic	Automatic	Automatic
CO_{2} emissions (g/km)	216	212		217–239	219	269	265–281		317
Environmental classification (EU)				Euro 4	Euro 5	Euro 5			

=== Safety ===
The Volvo XC90's front end is designed to absorb frontal impacts and also deflect any pedestrians up on to the hood of the vehicle rather than underneath the vehicle. Volvo has patented the unique frontal structure that features crumple zones, and predetermined positions for the engine and other ancillaries during a frontal impact.

The XC90's roof is reinforced with ultra-high-strength steel to help prevent a collapse in the passenger cavity in the event of a roll-over. This Volvo system is marketed as ROPS, and is closely associated with the Roll Stability Control (RSC), electronic stability control (DSTC), and SIPS systems of Volvo to prevent and ultimately minimise accident forces. The National Highway Traffic Safety Administration measures the roll-over risk of the 2013 XC90 as 17.9%. The maximum sideway thrust is 0.77g.

The XC90's rear structure has been designed to absorb impact energy, with occupants are also protected by a whiplash protection system. Marketed as WHIPS, the system cradles the occupants during a rear-end collision.

The Insurance Institute for Highway Safety awarded the Volvo XC90 their Top Safety Pick award. The XC90 was granted the IIHS's rating of "good" in front, side, rear and roof strength tests and has Electronic Stability Control as standard equipment to receive the award.

The industry-first Roll Stability Control was first introduced in XC90 in 2003.

At the end of July 2007, Volvo Car Corp. announced the recall of 42,211 2005 model year XC90s for risk of battery short circuit and fire. The vehicles were manufactured in the Swedish Torslanda Plant between 7 June 2004, and 13 May 2005. The recall only applies to cars in the US and Canada. There have been no reports of short circuiting in the vehicles.

ANCAP test results* Volvo XC90 (2003)
Test	Score
Overall	5 /5 stars
Frontal offset	13.81/16
Side impact	16/16
Pole	2/2
Seat belt reminders	2/3
Whiplash protection	Not Assessed
Pedestrian protection	Marginal
Electronic stability control	Standard

IIHS scores:
Small overlap front	Good^{1}
Moderate overlap front	Good
Side (2005–2014 models)	Good
Roof strength	Good^{2}
Head restraints & seats	Good^{3}

^{1} vehicle structure rated "Good"
^{2} strength-to-weight ratio: 4.51
^{3} seat/head restraint geometry rated "Good"

== Second generation (2015) ==
Second generation
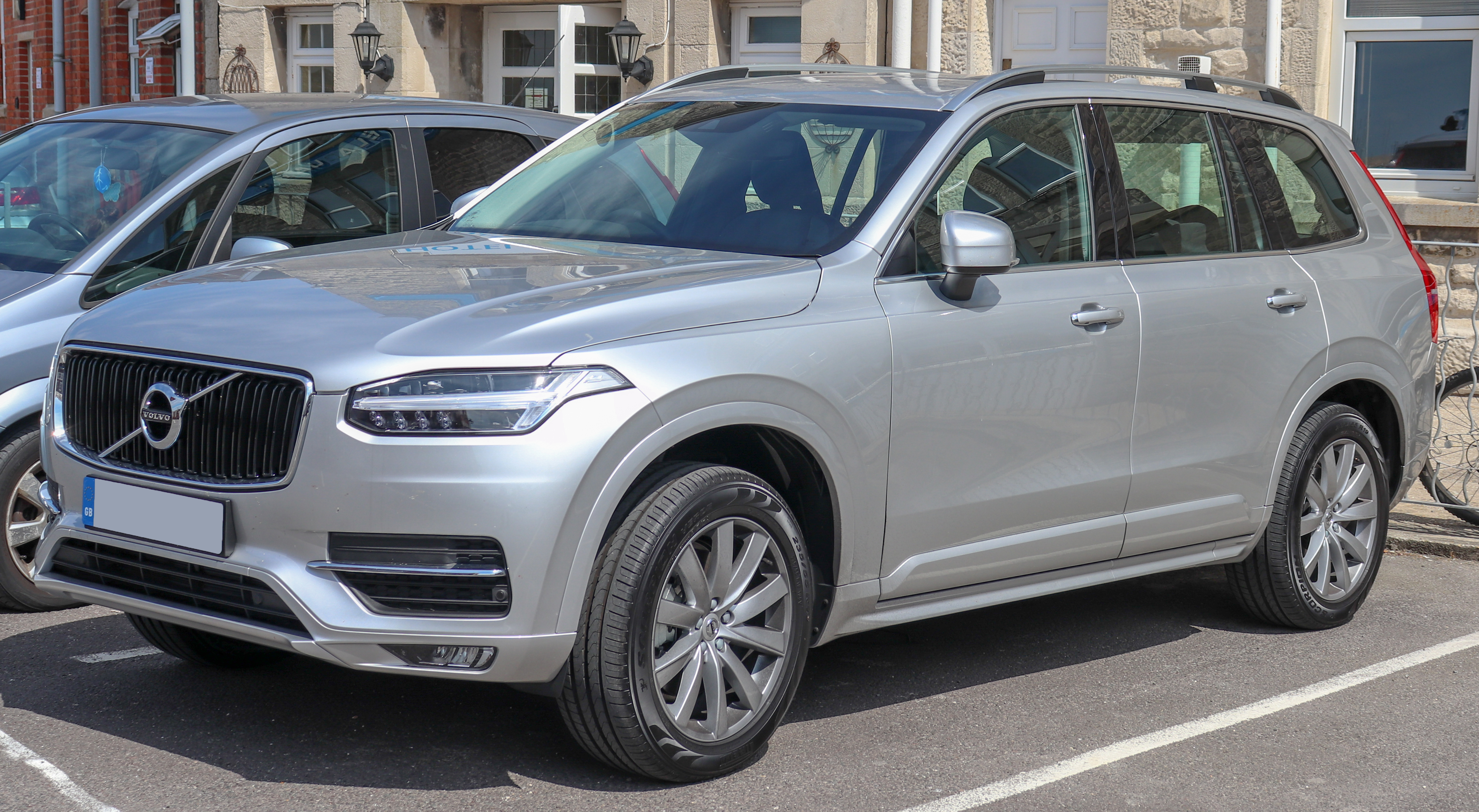
- 2018 Volvo XC90

Overview
- Production: 2015–present
- Model years: 2016–present (US)
- Assembly: Sweden: Torslanda (Torslandaverken); Malaysia: Shah Alam (VCMM); India: Bengaluru (Volvo Trucks)
- Designer: Thomas Ingenlath; Robin Page (interior designer)

Body and chassis
- Body style: 5-door 2-3 row, SUV
- Platform: Volvo SPA platform
- Related: Volvo S90 II; Volvo V90 II

Powertrain
- Engine: Petrol: 2.0 L Drive-E turbo I4; 2.0 L Drive-E twincharged I4; 2.0 L B4204T27 Drive-E twincharged mild hybrid I4; 2.0 L Drive-E twincharged PHEV I4; 2.0 L D420T2 Drive-E turbo mild hybrid I4; Diesel: 2.0 L Drive-E turbo I4
- Electric motor: 14 hp (10 kW; 14 bhp) B-ISG (B5/B6 MHEV); Permanent Magnet Synchronous Motors (T8 Twin Engine/T8 Recharge)
- Transmission: 8-speed Aisin AW TG-81SC Geartronic automatic
- Hybrid drivetrain: MHEV (B5/B6); Plug-in hybrid (T8)
- Battery: 48V lithium-ion battery (MHEV); 9.2 kWh (33 MJ) lithium-ion battery (2014–2018); 11.6 kWh (42 MJ) (2019–present); 18.8 kWh (68 MJ) (2021–present)

Dimensions
- Wheelbase: 2,984 mm (117.5 in)
- Length: 4,950 mm (194.9 in)
- Width: 1,923 mm (75.7 in)
- Height: 1,776 mm (69.9 in)
- Curb weight: 2,078–2,343 kg (4,581–5,165 lb)

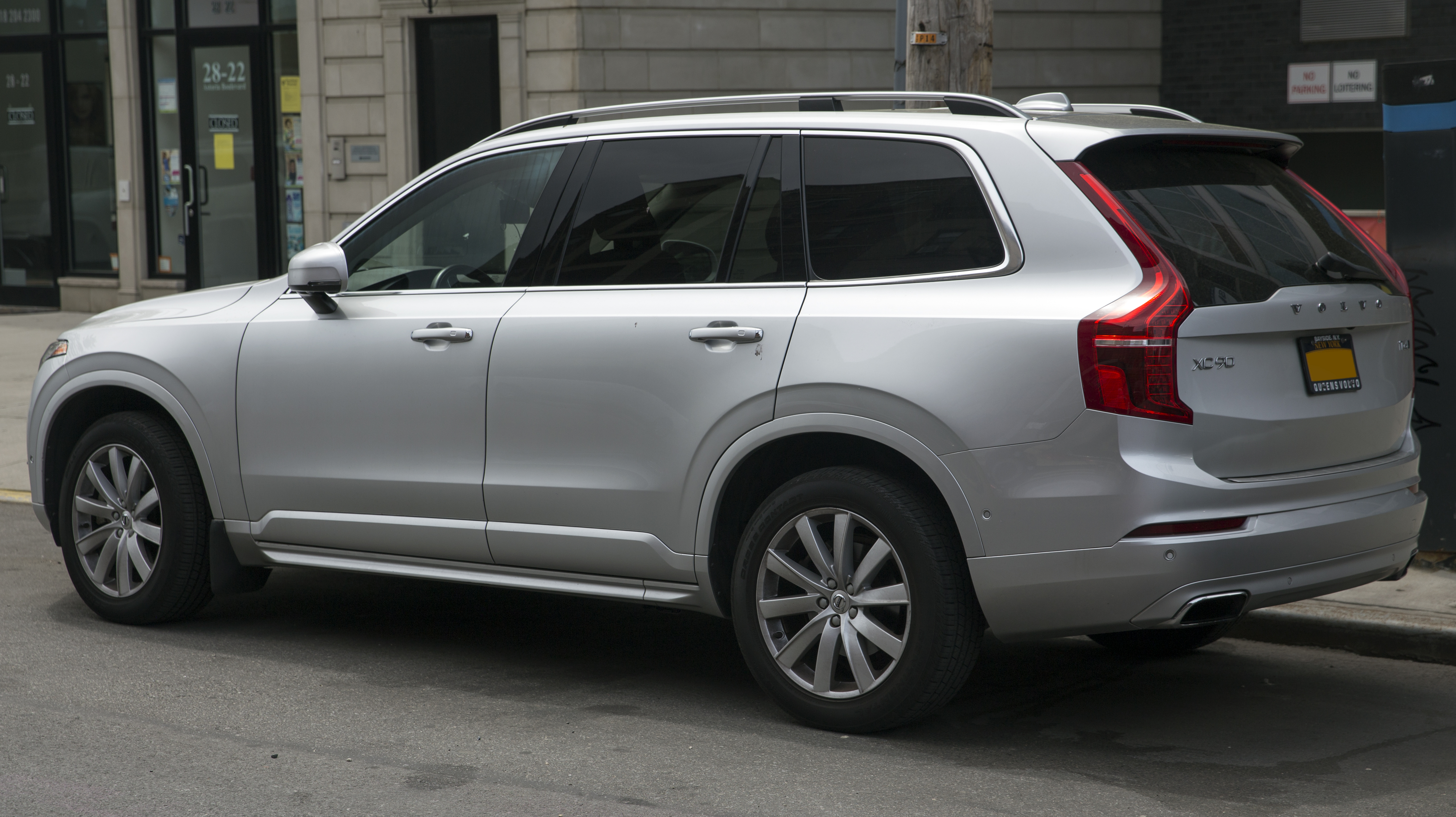
2017 Volvo XC90 Momentum (rear view)

In May 2012 Volvo announced that the second generation XC90 would go into production in late 2014, unveiled to the public in Stockholm on August 26, 2014, with orders being taken in 2014 and the vehicle officially going on sale in 2015. The SUV would be sold in Europe, Asia and North America, with the United States expected to account for at least a third of global sales.

In 2006, Volvo had begun development of a second generation XC90 using Ford's EUCD platform under the codename Y305, but was cancelled in 2008 as Ford and Volvo were facing strong financial hardships due to the global economic turndown and lack of resources to meet stricter fuel economy and emissions regulations.

The XC90 is based on Volvo's new platform, marketed as Scalable Product Architecture (SPA) technology which features a stronger platform offering weight reduction while improving safety and efficiency.

The vehicle is longer, wider and lower than its predecessor. All engines in the XC90 are 2.0-litre four-cylinder Drive-E powertrains with Volvo's eight-speed Geartronic transmission, delivered by Aisin. The line-up include two petrol engines: a twincharged 320 hp (239 kW; 324 PS) T6, producing 400 N⋅m (295 lb⋅ft) of torque and a turbocharged 254 hp (189 kW; 258 PS) T5, producing 350 N⋅m (258 lb⋅ft) of torque, two diesel engines: a twin turbo 235 hp (175 kW; 238 PS) D5, producing 470 N⋅m (347 lb⋅ft) of torque and a turbocharged 190 hp (142 kW; 193 PS) D4, producing 400 N⋅m (295 lb⋅ft) of torque. The top-of-the-line model is the XC90 T8 Twin Engine, a plug-in hybrid which combines the more powerful petrol engine at the front with an electric motor at the rear to produce 400 hp (298 kW; 406 PS) and 640 N⋅m (472 lb⋅ft) of torque.

The First Edition of the all-new Volvo XC90, was 1,927 individually numbered cars only available for sale via digital commerce, and sold out in 47 hours after orders opened on 3 September 2014. All 1,927 of the First Edition models, which could feature either the Petrol T6 or Diesel D5 engine, were finished in Onyx Black and feature 21-inch alloy wheels and include every available vehicle option. The limited production run number represents the year the Swedish brand was launched, with each model fitted with uniquely numbered tread plates and a distinctive rear mounted badge, with customers able to select their XC90 First Edition numbers. Number 1 was allocated to Carl XVI Gustav, the King of Sweden, with number 10 going to Zlatan Ibrahimović, a Swedish professional footballer.

=== Design ===
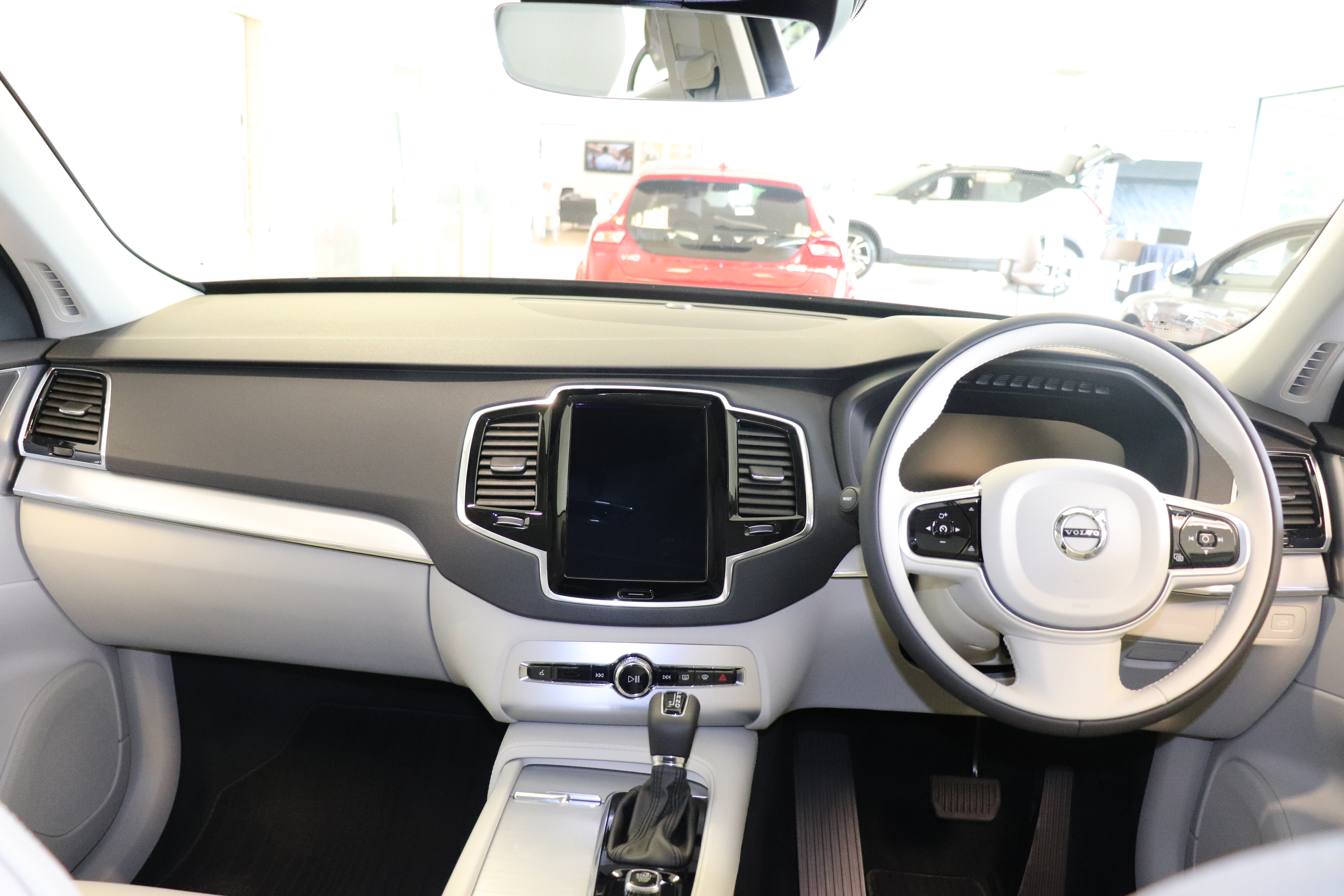
Interior

The new XC90 has a redesigned chassis with double wishbone front suspension and a new integral link rear axle incorporating transverse leaf spring of lightweight material. The new XC90 can also be equipped with electronically controlled air suspension with a choice of five modes.

The interior features a 9" tablet-like touch screen control console along with steering wheel controls and voice-control system, all linked to an interface, marketed as Sensus, which allows for access to cloud-based apps including Internet radio, connected navigation, parking, music streaming, Apple CarPlay and Android Auto, and a Wi-Fi hot spot for using a tablet in the car. Other features include a gear lever made of Orrefors crystal as well as diamond-cut controls for the start/stop button and drive mode control, located on the centre console between the driver and passenger seats.

The highest level audio system in the XC90 features a 1400W Class-D amplifier and 19 Bowers & Wilkins speakers as well as one of the first air-ventilated subwoofers in a car. Integrated into the car body, it turns the entire interior space into a large subwoofer. The latest sound processing software has been used to manage the timing of the sound and co-ordination of the speakers.

The vehicle's seats have also been redesigned with adjustable side bolsters, seat cushion extension and massage. The second row features three individual seats with recline adjustment. A sliding function can be used to create more legroom for the passengers in the third row or to increase loading space. An integrated child booster cushion in the centre seat is available. The Volvo XC90 seats five people in two rows of seating or seven people in three rows of seating. The five-seat layout version of the XC90 was discontinued after the 2017 model year, as third-row seating was made standard on all Volvo XC90s regardless of trim level and powertrain choice (with the exception of the Excellence Trim level) from the 2018 model year. Second-row captain chairs, which eliminates the centre seat in the second row and reduces capacity to six people, became optional on the Volvo XC90 in 2019 for the 2020 model year.

Volvo Cars' air purification system has been improved by adding a new carbon filter for more efficient capture of small, particles and pollen in the incoming air. The second generation XC90 offers a 360-degree view system capable of providing the driver with a birds-eye view, whereby information from all cameras is gathered and digitally integrated in a central processor to form a 360-degree image. The rear sensing system, marketed as Park Assist Pilot, offers automatic reversing into a parking bay.

The 2nd generation XC90 was the first Volvo to carry the company's new, more prominent iron mark, which has the iconic arrow aligned with the diagonal metallic slash across the grille, along with T-shaped LED daytime running lights known as "Thor's Hammer" by Volvo designers.

The car is available in five trim levels (Volvo describing it as "expressions"), namely Kinetic (base trim level), Momentum, Inscription (a more luxurious trim), R-design (a sportier trim) and Excellence (ultra-luxury).

=== Safety ===
The Second Generation Volvo XC90 SUV feature (IntelliSafe), including Run-off-road protection package and Auto brake at intersection.

The Volvo XC90 safety systems include:

- Run-off-road protection package. In a run-off-road scenario, the all-new Volvo XC90 detects what is happening and the front safety belts are tightened to keep the occupants in position. To help prevent Spinal cord injury, energy-absorbing functionality between the seat and seat frame cushions the vertical forces that can arise when the car encounters a hard landing in the terrain.
- City Safety with auto brake in intersections. The XC90 is the first car in the world with technology that features automatic braking if the driver turns in front of an oncoming car. This is a common scenario at busy city crossings as well as on highways, where the speed limits are higher.
- IntelliSafe with City Safety has become the umbrella name for all of Volvo Cars' auto brake Collision avoidance functions, which are standard equipment in the new XC90. This equipment now covers vehicles, cyclists and pedestrians in front of the car during both day and night.
- Adaptive Cruise Control with Pilot Assist traffic jam assistant enables safe and comfortable semi-autonomous driving by automatically following the vehicle ahead in stop-and-go traffic. Acceleration, braking and now also steering are controlled automatically.

ANCAP test results* Volvo XC90 diesel variants (2015, aligned with Euro NCAP)
Test	Points	%
Overall:	5 /5 stars	
Adult occupant:	37	97%
Child occupant:	43	87%
Pedestrian:	25.9	72%
Safety assist:	10.3	73%

==== Pilot Assist II 2017 model year ====
A lane departure warning system includes a semi-autonomous drive technology, Pilot Assist II as standard on the XC90 in selected markets for the 2017 model year.

The Volvo brand has also made the claim that "By 2020, nobody shall be seriously injured or killed in a new Volvo."

Euro NCAP tested a 2015 XC90 (model year 2016), 5-door SUV with standard equipment. Euro NCAP regards the XC90 model as a "best in class" performer. NHTSA only recorded for rollover.

NHTSA		Euro NCAP	
Overall:	5/5 stars	Overall:	5/5 stars
Frontal – Driver:	5/5 stars	Adult occupant:	37 pts / 97%
Frontal – Passenger:	5/5 stars	Child occupant:	24 pts / 87%
Side – Driver:	5/5 stars	Pedestrian:	26 pts / 72%
Side – Passenger:	5/5 stars	Driver assist:	13 pts / 100%
Side Pole – Driver:	5/5 stars		
Rollover:	/ 17.9%		

The Insurance Institute for Highway Safety also crash-tested the XC90, and presented the following results:

IIHS scores
Category	Rating
Small overlap front: driver side	Good^{1}
Small overlap front: passenger side	Good^{1}
Moderate overlap front	Good
Side	Good
Roof strength	Good^{2}
Head restraints & seats	Good^{3}

^{1} vehicle structure rated "Good"
^{2} strength-to-weight ratio: 5.18
^{3} seat/head restraint geometry rated "Good"

With over 50,000 vehicles sold in the UK by 2018, no driver or passenger fatality had been recorded.

=== T8 ===
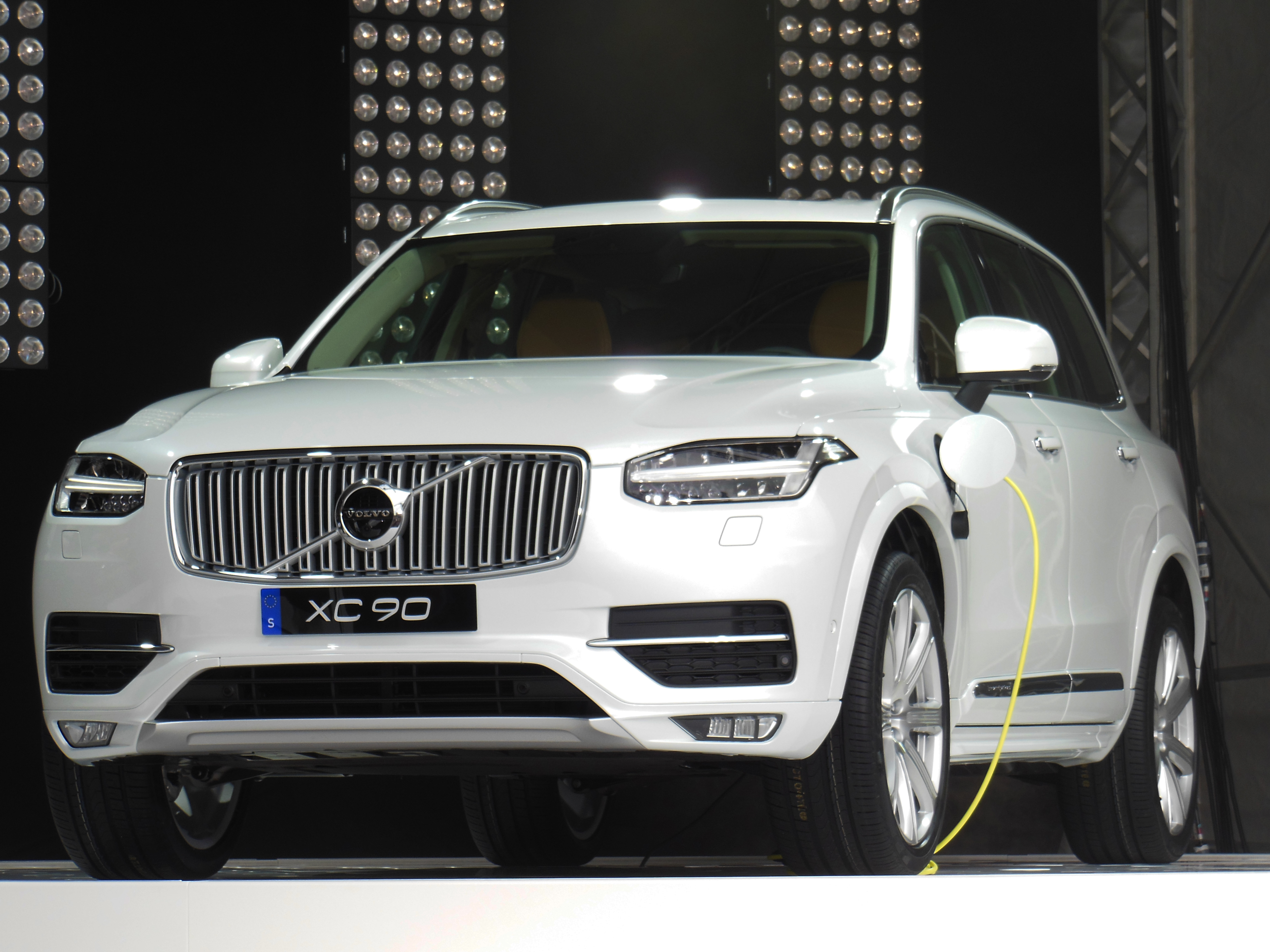
Volvo XC90 T8 plug-in hybrid

The T8 plug-in hybrid version of the XC90 is based on technology used in the Volvo V60 PHEV. The batteries, which are situated at the centre of the vehicle, can be charged using an electric vehicle charger and can also store energy recovered by regenerative braking. Volvo says that the XC90 T8 sacrifices no passenger or cargo space to accommodate the hybrid equipment. However, the tank capacity was reduced to 50 litres (13.2 US gal; 11.0 imp gal) for 2016–2018 models and the spare tire was removed.

The vehicle emits 49 g/km of CO_{2} and has an all-electric range of 43 km (27 mi) under the New European Driving Cycle. Normal driving is conducted in the default hybrid mode, but the driver can switch to a mode that uses only electric power, with zero emission driving. Under the U.S. Environmental Protection Agency (EPA) tests, at launch, the XC90 T8 had an all-electric range of 14 miles (23 km), with some petrol consumption (0.1 gal/100 mi), so the actual all-electric range was rated between 0 to 13 miles (0 to 21 km).

The EPA, under its five-cycle tests, rated the 2016 model year XC90 T8 energy consumption in all-electric mode at 58 kWh per 100 miles, which translates into a combined city/highway fuel economy of 53 miles per gallon petrol equivalent (MPG-e) (4.4 L/100 km (64 mpg_{‑imp}) petrol equivalent). When powered only by the petrol engine, EPA's official combined city/highway fuel economy is 25 mpg_{‑US} (9.4 L/100 km; 30 mpg_{‑imp}).

At launch, for the 2016 model year, the XC90 T8 used a 9.2 kWh (33 MJ) lithium-ion battery (6.7 kWh (24 MJ) usable). Over time, Volvo continued to gradually increase the battery size. In 2017, for the 2018 model year, it was increased to 10.4 kWh (37 MJ) (8.0 kWh (29 MJ) usable); for the 2020 model year, it was increased to 11.6 kWh (42 MJ); and for the 2023 model year, it was increased to 18.6 kWh (67 MJ).

Deliveries of the XC90 T8 PHEV began in the United States in August 2015. Sales in Europe totaled 2,653 units in 2015. Cumulative sales in the US totaled 488 units up until February 2016. According to Volvo, sales of the plug-in variant represent 20% of Volvo XC90 global sales by mid-March 2016.

In 2021, the T8 powertrain was updated with a more powerful electric motor (delivering 107 kW (143 hp; 145 PS)), updated engine and increased battery capacity (18.8 kWh (68 MJ)).

=== Trim levels ===
The second-generation Volvo XC90 is available in three distinct trim levels: Momentum, R Design, and Inscription. Momentum is the "base" design, and does not include features such as full leather-trimmed seating surfaces, woodgrain interior trim, or a GPS navigation system as standard equipment. The R Design features "Nubuck" upholstery and a sports exterior body kit, as well as dark trim accents on the exterior and interior. Inscription is the top-of-the-line design, and features full perforated Napa leather-trimmed seating surfaces, woodgrain interior trim, dual heated front, optional heated outboard rear seats, and additional bright accents on the exterior. For 2017, an "Excellence" trim was introduced (see below) with the "T8" plug-in hybrid (PHEV) powertrain as standard equipment, as well as additional luxury features.

==== XC90 T8 Excellence ====
For 2017, a new "Excellence" trim level was introduced as a luxury-oriented version of the XC90. The Excellence offered a four-passenger (front/rear) seating configuration, which included rear "lounge" bucket seats that were heated and ventilated. Additional features included the Bowers and Wilkins premium surround-sound audio system with amplifier, heated and ventilated front and rear seats, a dual-pane panoramic power moonroof, rear seat entertainment system, and the "T8" plug-in hybrid (PHEV) powertrain. There were a limited number of additional options available for the Excellence trim. The Excellence trim was discontinued following the 2020 model year, leaving the Inscription as the top trim level of the XC90.

=== 2019 facelift ===
In February 2019, for the 2020 model year, the XC90 received a mid-cycle facelift. The facelift included revised front and rear fascias includes a new front grille design, new exterior colours, new wheel designs, the Sensus infotainment system became compatible with Android Auto, and the addition of a new kinetic energy recovery braking system.

For the 2021 model year, the "T8" powertrain was renamed the "XC90 Recharge".

In 2022, for the 2023 model year, the base Momentum was replaced with the Core and Plus models depending on options, the R Design replaced with Plus and Ultimate models optioned with the Dark Theme, and the Inscription replaced with Plus and Ultimate models optioned in the Bright Theme. The range now included various previously cost-extra options as standard features.

In 2023, Volvo removed conventional engines as an option, meaning mild hybrids are the base engine option in the US, denoted with a "B" distinction.

In March 2024, the XC90 was the final Volvo car built with a diesel engine.

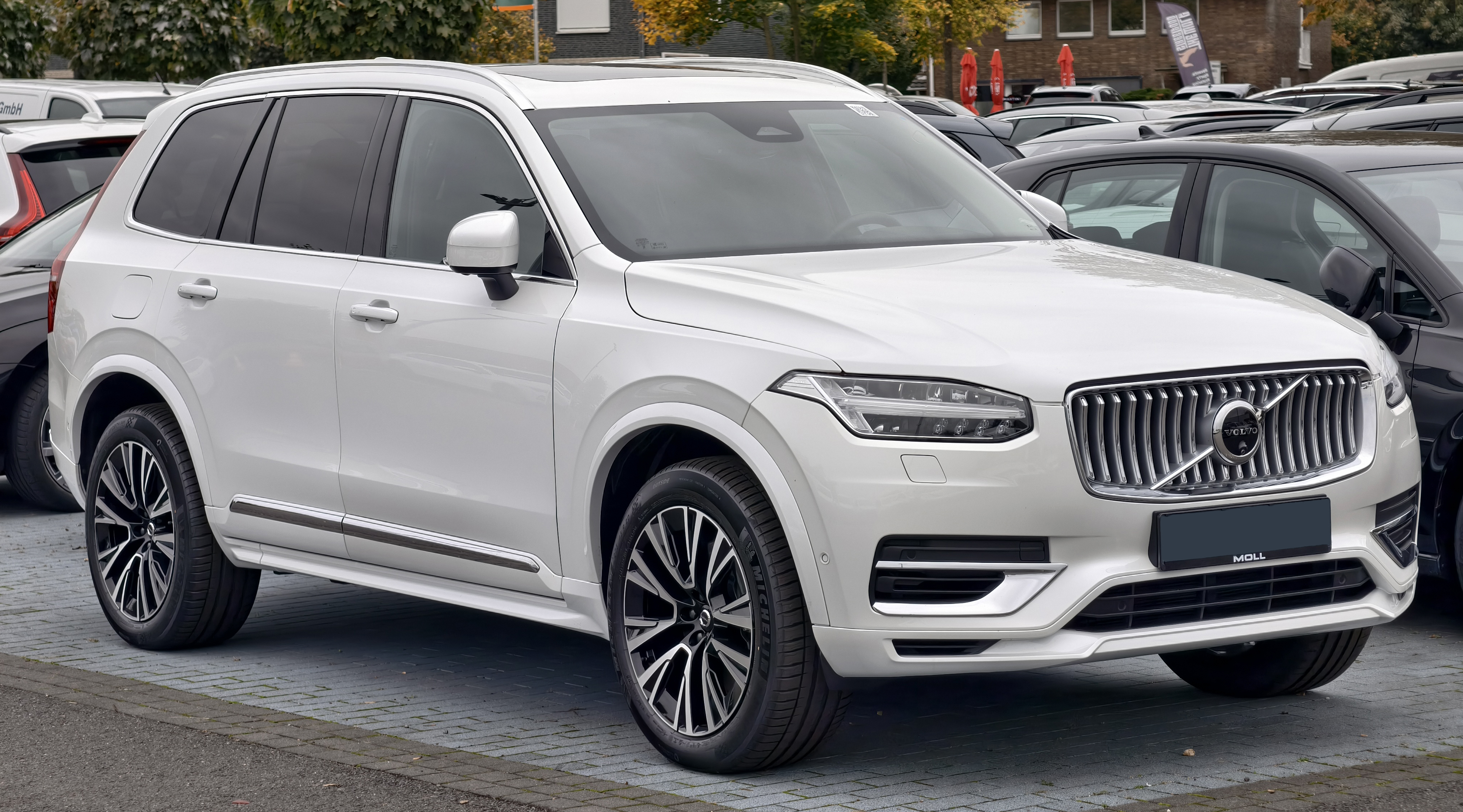
Volvo XC90 (first facelift)

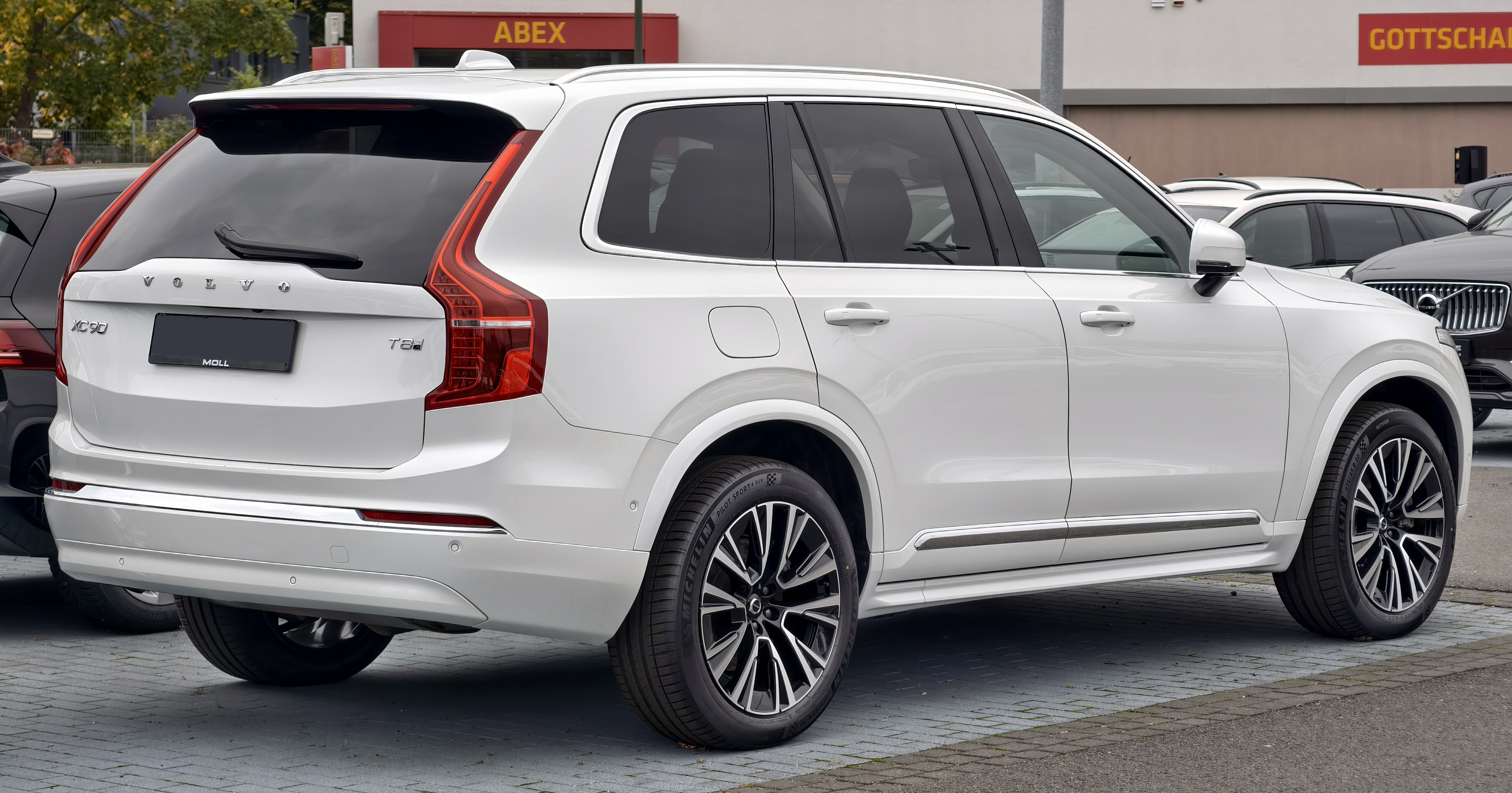
Volvo XC90 (first facelift)

=== 2024 facelift ===
In September 2024, for the 2025 model year, the XC90 received another facelift. Changes include a redesigned front fascia with new headlights and grille design, a modified front bumper, updated tinted LED taillights, a new 11.2-inch touchscreen infotainment system, increased interior storage spaces with a repositioned wireless charging pad, the dashboard features redesigned air vents and decorative materials made from recycled materials, and increased sound insulation. For 2025, the Ultimate trim was renamed Ultra.

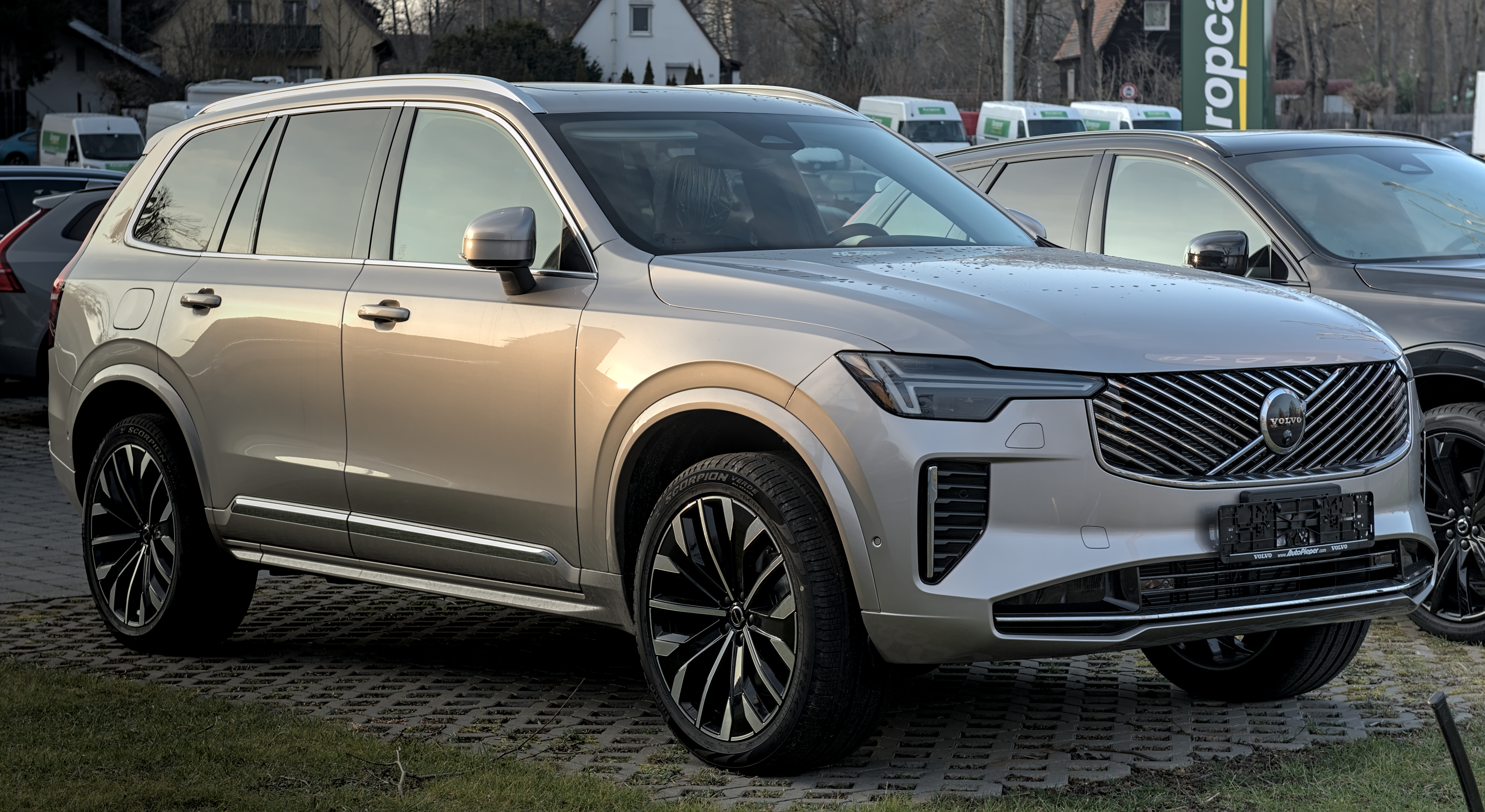
Volvo XC90 (second facelift)

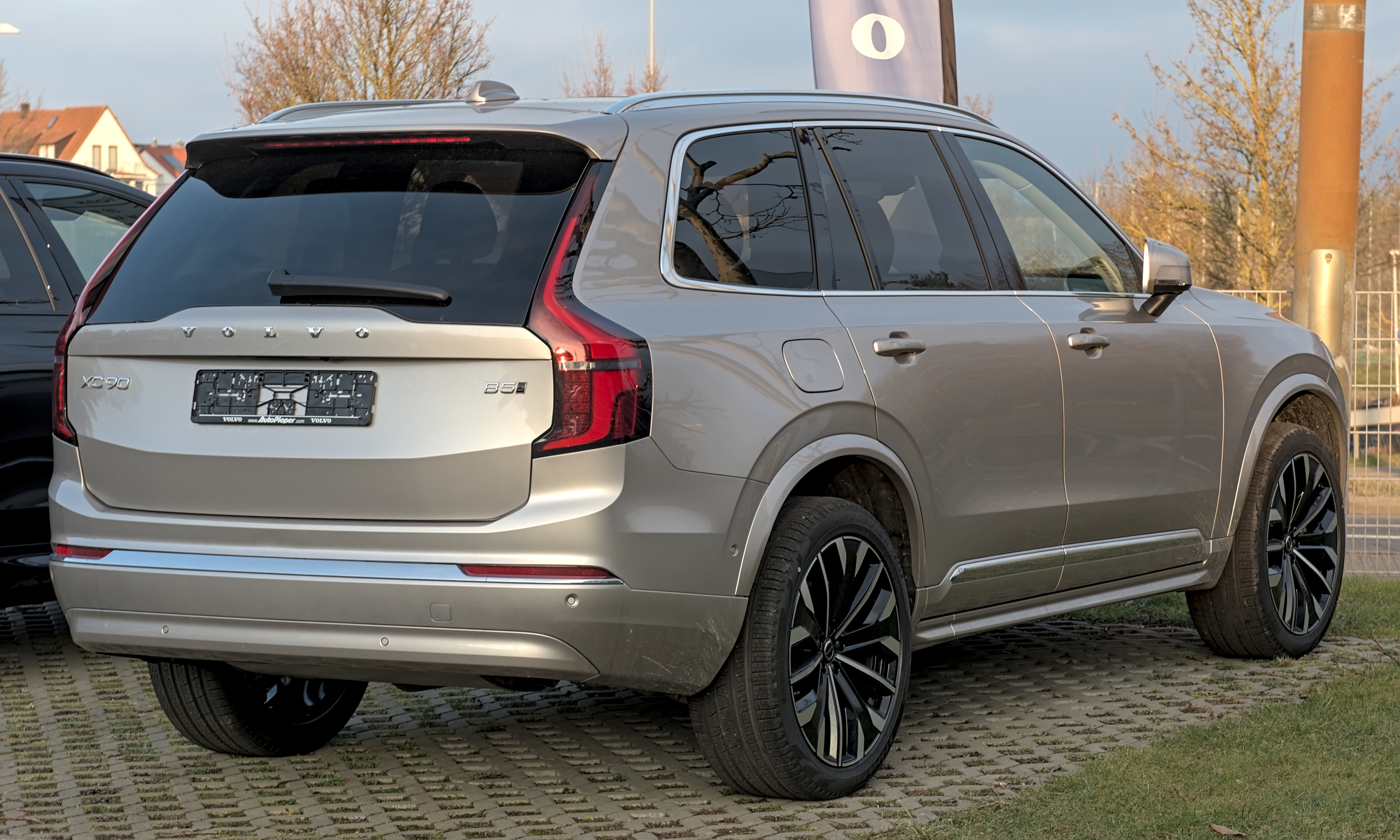
Volvo XC90 (second facelift)

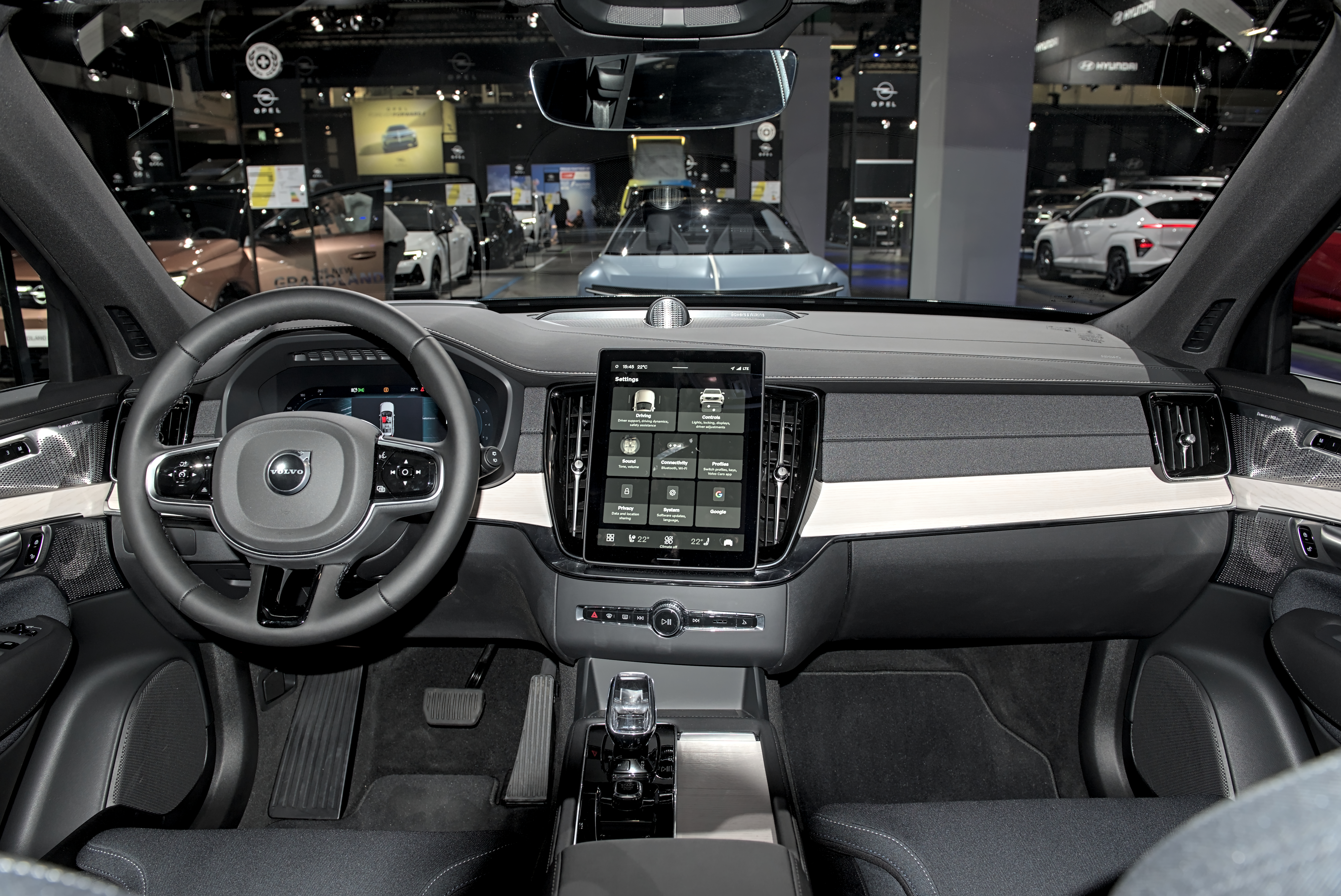
Interior

=== Asian markets ===
Volvos sold in Indonesia, the Philippines, Taiwan, Thailand, and Vietnam are all imported from Malaysia's Volvo factory in Shah Alam.

The XC90 has also been selling in India since September 2015 coming from the Volvo plant in Bengaluru, India.

=== Technical data ===
Specification	D4 FWD / AWD	D5 AWD	B5 AWD	T5 AWD	T6 AWD	B6 AWD	T8 Twin-Engine / Recharge
Length	4,950 mm (195 in)						
Width	1,923 mm (75.7 in)						
Height	1,775 mm (69.9 in)						
Wheelbase	2,984 mm (117.5 in)						
Luggage area volume	451 L (119.1 US gal; 99.2 imp gal)						
Seats	5 or 7						4 or 7
Curb weight	2,050–2,130 kg (4,519–4,696 lb)	2,130–2,171 kg (4,696–4,786 lb)	2,121–2,170 kg (4,676–4,784 lb)	2,105–2,140 kg (4,641–4,718 lb)	2,124–2,165 kg (4,683–4,773 lb)		2,319–2,394 kg (5,113–5,278 lb)
Tank Capacity	71 L (18.8 US gal; 15.6 imp gal)	71 L (18.8 US gal; 15.6 imp gal)	71 L (18.8 US gal; 15.6 imp gal)	71 L (18.8 US gal; 15.6 imp gal)	71 L (18.8 US gal; 15.6 imp gal)	71 L (18.8 US gal; 15.6 imp gal)	71 L (18.8 US gal; 15.6 imp gal)
Cylinders	In-line 4 (4 valves/cylinder)						
Engine	2.0L Turbo Diesel	2.0L Twin-turbo Diesel	2.0L D420T2 Mild-Hybrid Turbo Petrol	2.0L Turbo Petrol	2.0L Turbocharged & Supercharged "twincharged" petrol	2.0L B420T27 Mild-Hybrid Turbocharged & Supercharged "twincharged" petrol	2.0L Turbocharged Petrol with Electric Rear Axle Drive (PHEV)
Displacement (cc)	1969						
Fuel economy (Mixed)	5.2–5.7 L/100 km	5.7 L/100 km	6.5–9.5 L/100 km	7.7 L/100 km	8.1 L/100 km	L/100 km	1.2–1.5 L/100 km
Fuel economy (Country road)	4.9–5.4 L/100 km	5.4 L/100 km	— L/100 km	0 L/100 km	0 L/100 km	— L/100 km	— L/100 km
Fuel economy (City)	5.8–6.2 L/100 km	6.3 L/100 km	— L/100 km	9.5 L/100 km	10.1 L/100 km	— L/100 km	— L/100 km
Max power output	190 PS (140 kW; 187 bhp)	225 hp (168 kW; 225 bhp) at 4250 rpm	235 hp (175 kW; 235 bhp) at 4250 rpm	245 PS (180 kW; 242 bhp)	320 PS (235 kW; 316 bhp) at 5700 rpm	300 PS (221 kW; 296 bhp) at 5700 rpm	455 PS (335 kW; 449 bhp)
Max torque	400 N⋅m (295 lb⋅ft)	470 N⋅m (347 lb⋅ft) at 1750–2500 rpm	480 N⋅m (354 lb⋅ft) at 1750–2500 rpm	350 N⋅m (258 lb⋅ft)	400 N⋅m (295 lb⋅ft) at 2200–4500 rpm	420 N⋅m (310 lb⋅ft) at 2200–4500 rpm	709 N⋅m (523 lb⋅ft)
Acceleration 0–100 km/h (0–62 mph) (sec)	9.2–9.4	7.8	7.6	8.2	6.5	7.5	5.4
Top speed	200–205 km/h (124–127 mph)	220 km/h (137 mph)	180 km/h (112 mph)	215 km/h (134 mph)	230 km/h (143 mph)	180 km/h (112 mph)	230 km/h (143 mph)
Transmission	8-speed Geartronic Aisin AW TG-81SC automatic						
CO_{2} emissions (g/km)	136–149	149	171–199	176	184	210	49
Environmental classification (EU)	Euro 6b	Euro 6b	Euro 6b	Euro 6b	Euro 6b	Euro 6b	Euro 6b

== Awards and recognition ==
- Motor Trend's 2003 SUV of the Year
- Motor Trend's 2016 SUV of the Year
- Yahoo Autos 2016 Tech Ride of the Year
- Yahoo Autos 2016 Ride of the Year
- 2016 North American Car and Truck/Utility of the Year - Detroit Motor Show 2016
- 2015 Best AWD SUV - Australia's Best Cars
- 2016 South African Car of the Year
- The 2016 XC90 was named one of the top ten tech cars in 2016 by IEEE Spectrum.

== Sales ==
Retail sales volume
Calendar year	United States	Europe	China			Global
Calendar year	United States	Europe	XC90	PHEV	Total	Global
2002	4,379	1,143		—		
2003	35,791	17,587		—		
2004	39,230	32,032		—		
2005	36,025	35,179		—		
2006	33,241	34,921		—		85,064
2007	31,358	27,961		—		79,140
2008	18,981	15,999		—		52,872
2009	10,757	11,252		—		32,754
2010	10,119	14,691		—		37,597
2011	10,609	13,216		—		39,631
2012	9,513	9,387		—		31,290
2013	6,845	7,690		—		23,784
2014	3,952	6,931		—		17,869
2015	12,777	20,487				43,102
2016	32,526	35,471				92,449
2017	30,996	30,367				87,518
2018	31,609	30,356				94,182
2019	35,760	29,252				100,729
2020	34,251	24,584				92,458
2021	38,657	29,339				108,231
2022	34,101	26,407				97,130
2023	39,920		17,466	1,933	19,399	107,549
2024	39,492		15,547	985	16,532	108,621
2025	40,217		9,781	1,419	11,200	
