= Geartronic =

Transmission

Geartronic is Volvo Cars' name for its manumatic transmission, similar to Porsche's Tiptronic. It is available in 4-, 5-, 6-, and 8-speed models, and is controlled by a microprocessor. The microprocessor automatically shifts to the next gear if a user in manual mode red lines the engine. Manual shifting is allowed with the gear stick in the manual mode. The gear stick can also be used just like any other automatic gearbox, where the transmission will shift automatically.

Geartronic is offered on Volvo vehicles with engine displacements of 2.0 liters or greater. Geartronic transmissions are manufactured in Japan by Aisin AW. They require the use of automatic transmission fluid that meets the JWS 3309 specification. The MY2011 6-speed requires AW1.

== Applications ==
- Volvo C30
- Volvo C70
- Volvo S40
- Volvo S60
- Volvo S80
- Volvo S90
- Volvo V40
- Volvo V50
- Volvo V60
- Volvo V70
- Volvo V90
- Volvo XC40
- Volvo XC60
- Volvo XC70
- Volvo XC90
