= Volvo City Safety =

Auto brake technology

City Safety is an auto brake technology developed by Volvo Cars, designed to reduce or avoid traffic accidents. It comes in two generations, with the first operating at speeds up to 30 km/h (19 mph) and the second, functioning at speeds up to 50 km/h (31 mph).

The system uses a lidar laser sensor, to monitor the area in front of the vehicle, activating the brakes and disengaging the throttle if a potential collision is detected and the driver does not respond. At relative speeds of 15 km/h (9.3 mph) or less, the technology may prevent a collision entirely, and at speeds up to about 30 km/h (19 mph), it can significantly reduce the impact of a collision. These specifications primarily apply to the first generation of the technology.

The auto brake system features several operational characteristics.:

- Emergency Braking Alert: Rapid flashing of brake lights during emergency braking warns drivers behind about a sudden stop.
- Post-Stop Brake Release: The brakes automatically release about 2 seconds after halting, requiring the driver to manually maintain the vehicle's stationary position.
- Adverse Weather Performance: The system's effectiveness can be reduced in heavy rain, fog, or snow, although it functions consistently in various lighting conditions.
