= Volvo AW70 series transmissions =

The AW70 series is a group of 4-speed automatic transmissions built by Aisin-Warner, a Japanese-American joint venture company, for the Volvo 240, 740 and 940. Three models constitute the series, all based on the AW70, which was first used in 1981 Volvo models.

== AW70 ==
The AW70 is a 4-speed fully automatic transmission used in the Volvo 240, 740, and 940 series cars from 1982 to 1998. From the 1989 model year, a lock-up torque converter was offered, which changed the designation to AW70L. This transmission was originally used in the US specification 1982 Volvo 240 with the B21F engine, as well as in 1983 with the B23F engine. The AW70 did not see worldwide usage until 1984 in certain 240 series cars.

== AW71 ==
The AW71 and AW71L were strengthened versions of the AW70 transmission used in the Volvo 760, 940, and some 740s and 240s with turbocharged and higher-output naturally aspirated engines. Some appeared in 1985-87 240s with the B230F engine. It was also used in late model European-spec Volvo 260 series cars. North American market Volvo 260 cars used the Borg Warner Type 55 transmission.

Identical to the Toyota A43D and A43DL except with different, interchangeable tailshaft housings and tailshaft flanges.

== AW72 ==
An automatic gearbox built by Aisin of Japan used the Volvo 16-valve B234F 4-cylinder engine found in the 740 GLE. This gearbox is a modified AW71 with different ratios to leverage the unique power curve characteristics produced by the 16-valve head (when compared to the 8-valve B230F/FT with an AW71 gearbox).

It is identical to the Toyota A44DL except with different, interchangeable tailshaft housings and tailshaft flanges.

== The ZF alternative ==
The AW70 series was not the only automatic transmission used in Volvo cars of this era. Volvo also used the 4-speed ZF 4HP22 (characterised by a gearshift labeled "P R N D 3 2 1", while the AW70/71/72 had a gearshift labeled "P R N D 2 1" with an overdrive lockout button, side-, then rear-mounted). The ZF 4HP22 was mounted on the 740/760 turbo models (B230ET), on most European 940 B230FB engines, and on all the 740/760 and 940/960 turbo-diesel engines (D24T, D24TIC,...) from 1985 to 1998. It could handle high torques (also mounted on BMW, Jaguar, Maserati, and other luxury cars) and proved to be a reliable alternative to the AW70 series.

Except for the AW70 series overdrive, both AW70/71/72 and ZF 4HP22 transmissions were purely hydraulically controlled, avoiding any electronic problems, unlike competitors who had already opted for electronically controlled transmissions.

== Gear ratios ==
The gear ratios are:

Gear	AW70/71	AW72
1st	2.45	2.83
2nd	1.45	1.49
3rd	1.00	1.00
4th	0.69	0.73
Reverse	2.22	2.70
