= Volkswagen D24 engine =

/ D24
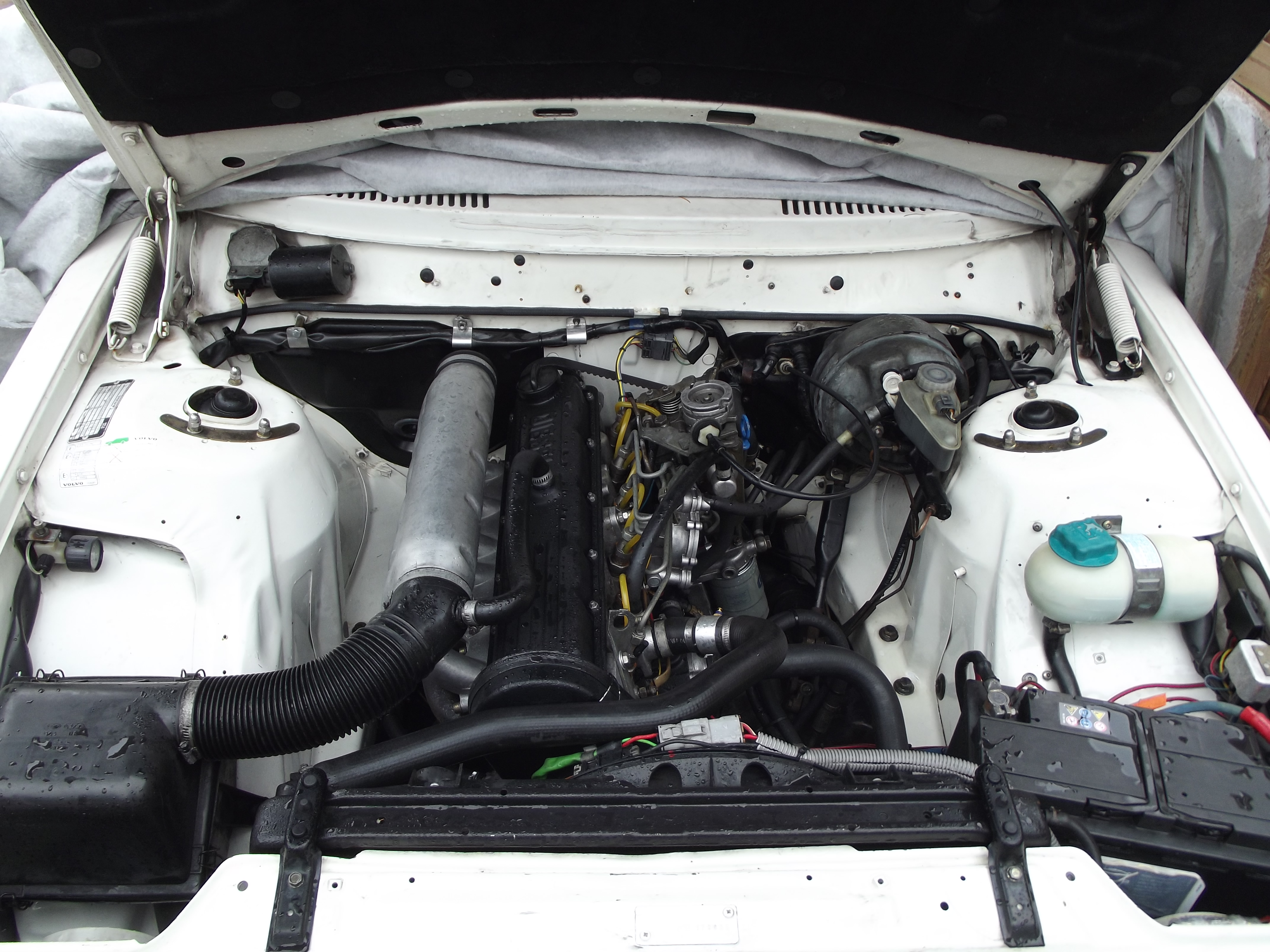
- D24 engine bay of a 1990 Volvo 240

Overview
- Manufacturer: Volkswagen Group
- Production: 1978–1995

Layout
- Configuration: inline/row 6-cylinder (R6/I6) diesel engine
- Displacement: 2,383 cc (145.4 cu in)
- Cylinder bore: 76.5 mm (3.01 in)
- Piston stroke: 86.4 mm (3.40 in)
- Cylinder block material: gray cast iron, 7 main bearings
- Cylinder head material: cast aluminium alloy
- Valvetrain: 12v, belt-driven single overhead camshaft (SOHC)
- Compression ratio: 23.5:1

Combustion
- Fuel system: Bosch mechanical distributor injection pump, indirect fuel injection
- Fuel type: diesel
- Oil system: wet sump
- Cooling system: water-cooled timing belt driven water pump

Output
- Power output: 82 hp at 4800 rpm (DIN)
- Torque output: 14.3 kpm at 2800 rpm

Dimensions
- Dry weight: 182 kg

Chronology
- Successor: Volkswagen D24 engine

The Volkswagen D24 engine is a 2.4-litre inline-six-cylinder (R6/I6), naturally aspirated diesel engine, formerly manufactured by Volkswagen Group from 1978 to 1995.

Subsequent forced induction variants of this engine were also available as the Volkswagen D24T engine with a turbocharger, and a turbo intercooled version, the Volkswagen D24TIC engine. These turbocharged variants resulted in higher power and torque outputs.

== Technical description ==
All variants (naturally aspirated and forced induction) displace 2,383 cubic centimetres (145.4 cu in) from a cylinder bore of 76.48 millimetres (3.01 in), and a piston stroke of 86.4 millimetres (3.40 in). Its inline six cylinder block is constructed from grey cast iron, and has seven main bearings to support the die-forged steel crankshaft. The cast aluminium alloy cylinder head contains two valves per cylinder each with two concentric valve springs, and shim-adjustable bucket tappets. The valves are opened via a timing belt-driven single overhead camshaft (SOHC), and the combustion chamber compression ratio is 23.0:1.

Attached to the cylinder head is a cast aluminium alloy intake manifold on one side, and two cast iron exhaust manifolds on the same side (it's a non cross flow engine) (one manifold for three cylinders) followed by a two in one exhaust pipe system. The fuel system uses a Bosch mechanical distributor-type (Bosch VE type) injection pump which feeds indirect fuel injection into a remote whirl pre-combustion chamber.

The cooling system is composed of a timing belt driven water pump, an 87 °C thermostat in the engine block itself. The thermostat receives coolant from the engine block and from a bypass running from the engine head. This system allows a very accurate opening and closing operation, avoiding thermal shocks and big coolant temperatures amplitude.

The initially available variant of the D24 produced a DIN-rated power output of 55 kilowatts (75 PS; 74 bhp) at 4,500 rpm; and it generated a torque of 155 newton-metres (114 lbf⋅ft) at 2,800 rpm. Subsequent minor updates and revisions resulted in differing power and torque ratings.

D24 models
ID(s)	DIN-rated max. power at rpm	max. torque at rpm	redline (rpm)	years
1S, ACT	51 kW (69 PS; 68 bhp) at 3,400	145 N⋅m (107 lbf⋅ft) at 1,600-1,800		1988–1995
CP, DW	55 kW (75 PS; 74 bhp) at 4,000	155 N⋅m (114 lbf⋅ft) at 2,800		1978–1992
Volkswagen D24	60 kW (82 PS; 80 bhp) at 4,800	140 N⋅m (103 lbf⋅ft) at 2,800		1978-1990
Volkswagen D24	58 kW (79 PS; 78 bhp) at 4,700	140 N⋅m (103 lbf⋅ft) at 2,400		1991-1993
Volkswagen D24 T (without intercooler)	80 kW (109 PS; 107 bhp) at 4,800	205 N⋅m (151 lbf⋅ft) at 2,500		1983-1991
Volkswagen D24 TIC (with intercooler)	90 kW (122 PS; 121 bhp) at 4,800	235 N⋅m (173 lbf⋅ft) at 2,400	max rpm @5200 rpm before fuel cut	1986-1995

The weight of this engine is 182 kg or 401 lbs.

== Applications ==
The D24 was fitted in the Volkswagen LT range from Volkswagen Commercial Vehicles, with factory production from August 1978 to December 1995. Specific dates of the variants - CP: 08/78-11/82, DW: 12/82-07/92, 1S: 08/88-07/92, ACT: 08/92-12/95.

The D24 was also found in a number of Volvo models, specifically the 240, 740, and 940, and it was coupled to Volvo ZF, Automatic Aisin Warner AW51, Automatic Borg Warner BW55, M45, M46 (overdrive) or M47, M47 II and M90 transmissions.

The D24 also found use in military vehicle applications. It was used in the Steyr-Daimler-Puch Pinzgauer High Mobility All-Terrain Vehicle 716 & 718 models in its turbocharged variant - the D24T.

== Operational experience ==
In service, the unit proved to be a somewhat mixed bag; some owners reported excellent reliability and long engine lives, others complained of overheating, frequent blowing of head gaskets, cylinder head cracks (cracks between the valve seats are common and do not represent danger if the cracks do not exceed specifications), premature wear of the bottom and top end bearings, low oil pressure etc.

A poorly maintained cooling system could also lead to overheating and, especially with the higher stressed turbo engines, head gasket problems. The head gasket problem has been treated with the adoption of a multi-layer steel head gasket which replaces the fiber one.

The camshaft drive belt also required changing at the recommended intervals, which was a pretty involved job, not least because of poor access in the under-floor engined LT vans, and the necessity of special (and expensive) locking tools to carry out the replacement, which have always been scarce and are becoming increasingly difficult to obtain.

The top end also featured adjustable tappets using the bucket and shim arrangement, and required checking every 25,000 miles (40,000 km), although later (1990–) models had self-adjusting hydraulic tappets.

In many cases however, engines that have been looked after properly and treated with mechanical sympathy, have been known to clock up 500,000 - 600,000 miles. This engine is particularly sensitive to being thrashed from cold, it is important to go gently until warmed up, and to avoid short journeys which will exacerbate rapid engine wear.

== See also ==
- List of Volkswagen Group diesel engines
- List of discontinued Volkswagen Group diesel engines
- Volkswagen Wasserboxer engine
- List of Volvo engines
