= List of Volvo engines =

Volvo Cars has a long reputation as a maker of inline (or straight) engines. This list of Volvo engines gives an overview of available internal combustion engines.

When Volvo started in 1927, they ordered their engines from the engine manufacturer Penta in Skövde. The first engine was the inline four-cylinder side valve 28 hp (21 kW) Type DA. In 1931, Volvo acquired a majority of the Penta stock, and in 1935, Penta became a subsidiary of Volvo. For the engines used by Volvo Trucks, see List of Volvo Trucks engines.

Previous owner, Ford Motor Company, allowed Volvo to continue to design their own engines, with a new-generation straight-six engine introduced in 2006. More recently the VEA program has been launched. VEA engines are branded as "Drive-E" in marketing. In 2017, Volvo Cars announced they will no longer develop diesel engines.

== Naming ==
To name their engines, Volvo has used:

- 1955–1985 — four or five characters
- 1985–1994 — five or six characters
- 1993–1994 — six to eight characters

Generally, the following naming scheme is used:

- Either B for Bensin (petrol/gasoline engines) or D for diesel engines
- Two digits for engine displacement (moved after number of cylinders from 1993)
- One for valves per cylinder (not found before 1985)
- One to three characters for other engine features

In 2010 Volvo changed their engine branding nomenclature so that it is independent of engine size and number of cylinders. The letter "D" designates diesel and "T" petrol. Letters are followed by a number that dictate the level of power. The table below list the lower limit power required for each emblem in 2010.

Diesel	Power [metric hp]	Petrol	Power [metric hp]
D8	300	T8	325
D6	250	T6	275
D5	200&215	T5	225
D4	165	T4	175
D3	135	T3	150
D2	115	T2	125
D1	90	T1	100

== Engines in production ==
=== Petrol ===
==== GEP3 ====
The Global Engine Petrol 3 is a three-cylinder engine jointly developed by Volvo and Geely based on the Volvo Engine Architecture. It is marketed under the Drive-E and G-power names.

==== VEP4 ====
The Volvo Engine Petrol 4 is a four-cylinder engine with 1.5L or 2.0L displacement. It is used by Volvo, Lynk&Co and Geely marque vehicles.

- T2 122 PS (90 kW) single turbo. From MY2016
- T3 152 PS (112 kW) single turbo. From MY2016
- T4 190 PS (140 kW) single turbo. From MY2016
- T5 245 PS (180 kW) single turbo. From MY2016
- T6 320 PS (235 kW) turbo and supercharger. From MY2016
- Polestar 367 PS (270 kW) turbo and supercharger. From MY2017
- T8 320 PS (235 kW) turbo, supercharger, and rear electric motor developing 87 PS (64 kW). From MY2016

=== Diesel ===
==== VED4 ====
The Volvo Engine Diesel 4 is a four-cylinder engine with 2.0L displacement. It is used by Volvo in certain markets and is the final family of Volvo Cars diesel engines after they announced in 2017 that they would no longer develop diesel engines. Most possible reason of that is a damaged overall reputation of diesel engines for passenger cars after 2015 Volkswagen Group emissions scandal.

- D2 120 PS (88 kW) single-turbo. From MY2016
- 181 PS (133 kW). In the following vehicles: S60/V60, XC60, S80/V70 & XC70/90.
- 190 PS (140 kW). In the following vehicles: V40/V40 Cross Country.

== Engines out of production ==
=== Side-valve six ===
Volvo's first six-cylinder engine was introduced in 1929. It was a side-valve straight-six engine.

- 1929–1958 side-valve six — PV651/2, TR671/4, PV653/4, TR676/9, PV658/9, PV36, PV51/2, PV53/6, PV801/2, PV821/2, PV831/2 and PV60

=== B4B ===
Volvo's next major advance was the B4B line of compact inline-four engines introduced in 1944.

- 1944–1956 B4B — 1.4 L (1,414 cc) — fitted into the Volvo PV and Volvo Duett
- B14A — twin-choke carburettor B4B - PV, Amazon, P1900
- 1957–1962 B16A and B16B — 1.6 L (1,583 cc) — enlarged B14A fitted into the PV, Duett and Volvo Amazon

=== B18 ===
The B18 of 1960 was the company's next major advance, with five main bearings.

- 1962–1974 B18 — 1.8 L (1,778 cc) — new-design 1.8 & 2.0 litres overhead valve (OHV) 8v fitted into all Volvo models from 1961 to 1974 (except the 164) and 1975 U.S.-spec 240 models
  - B18C - single carburetor version - fitted in the Volvo BM 320 tractor
  - B18A - single carburetor version
  - B18D - twin SU Carburettor version
  - B18B - twin SU or Zenith carburetor version
- 1969–1981 B20 — 2.0 L (1,986 cc) — evolution of the B18

=== B30 ===
The B30 was Volvo's second line of straight-six engines, introduced in 1968.

- 1968–1975 B30 — 3.0 L (2,979 cc) — fitted to all 164 models, as well as the Volvo C303 and marine, these engines carried designations AQ 95, AQ 165A and AQ 170A, B, or C.
  - B30A - twin Zenith Stromberg carburetor version
  - B30E - fuel injected version

=== V6 ===
Volvo introduced the PRV engine, its only V6 engine, in 1974. The PRV was available in 2.7 and 2.8 L configurations, with SOHC cylinder heads. The PRV was developed together with Renault and Peugeot; thus the acronym name PRV.

- 1975–1979 B27F — 2.7 L (2,664 cc) SOHC — Volvo 260

=== SOHC ===
- 1976–1984 B17 — 1.8 L (1,784 cc) SOHC 8-valve
  - 1979–1981 — B17A — 8.3:1 compression — 90 hp (67 kW; 91 PS)
- 1976–1984 B19 — 2.0 L (1,986 cc) SOHC 8-valve Volvo 340/360, Volvo 240, Volvo 740
  - 1974–1978 — B19A — 8.8:1 compression — 97 hp (72 kW; 98 PS)
  - 1974–1981 — B19E — 8.8:1 compression — 117 hp (87 kW; 119 PS)
  - 1979–1984 — B19A — 8.5:1 compression — 90 hp (67 kW; 91 PS)/97 hp (72 kW; 98 PS)
  - 1982–1984 — B19E — 9.2:1 compression — 117 hp (87 kW; 119 PS)
  - 1982–1984 — B19ET — ??:1 compression — 136–145 PS (100–107 kW)
- 1976–1985 B21 — 2.1 litres - 2.1 L (2,127 cc) SOHC 8-valve Volvo 240
  - 1976 B21F — 8.5:1 compression — 102 hp (76 kW; 103 PS) — U.S. models
  - 1977–1978 B21F — 8.5:1 compression — 104 hp (78 kW; 105 PS) — U.S. models
  - 1977–1978 B21F — 8.5:1 compression — 101 hp (75 kW; 102 PS) — California
  - 1979 B21F — 9.3:1 compression — 107 hp (80 kW; 108 PS) — North America
  - 1979 B21F — 8.5:1 compression — 101 hp (75 kW; 102 PS) — California
  - 1974–1980 B21E — 9.3:1 compression — 123 hp (92 kW; 125 PS) — European
  - 1980 B21A — 9.3:1 compression — 100 hp (75 kW; 101 PS) — Canada
  - 1980 B21F — 9.3:1 compression — 107 hp (80 kW; 108 PS) — U.S. & Canada models
  - 1981 B21F — 9.3:1 compression — 107 hp (80 kW; 108 PS) — California
  - 1981 B21F — 9.3:1 compression — 99 hp (74 kW; 100 PS) — U.S. models
  - 1981 B21FT — 7.5:1 compression — 126 hp (94 kW; 128 PS) — U.S. Turbo
  - 1981 B21A — 9.3:1 compression — 100 hp (75 kW; 101 PS) — Canada
  - 1981 B21F — 9.3:1 compression — 107 hp (80 kW; 108 PS) — U.S. models
  - 1982 B21F — 9.3:1 compression — 99 hp (74 kW; 100 PS) — U.S. models
  - 1982 B21F — 9.3:1 compression — 105 hp (78 kW; 106 PS) — California
  - 1982–1983 B21FT — 7.5:1 compression — 127 hp (95 kW; 129 PS) — U.S. models
  - 1984 B21FT — 7.5:1 compression — 131 hp (98 kW; 133 PS) — U.S. models
  - 1984 B21FT-IBS — 7.5:1 compression — 162 hp (121 kW; 164 PS) — U.S. models
- 1979–1984 B23 — 2.3 L (2,316 cc) SOHC 8-valve Volvo 240, Volvo 740
  - 1979–1980 B23E — 10.3:1 compression 140 hp (104 kW; 142 PS) — European
  - 1981–1982 B23E — 10.0:1 compression — 136 hp (101 kW; 138 PS) — Canada
  - 1983 B23F — 10.3:1 compression — 107 hp (80 kW; 108 PS) — U.S. models
  - 1984 B23E — 10.3:1 compression — 115 hp (86 kW; 117 PS) — Canada
  - 1983–1984 B23F — 9.5:1 compression — 111 hp (83 kW; 113 PS) — U.S. models
  - 1984 B23F — 10.3:1 compression — 114 hp (85 kW; 116 PS) — U.S. models
- 1985–1995 B200 — 2.0 L (1,986 cc) SOHC 8-valve Volvo 340/360 and 200/700/900 series for certain markets
- 1985–1995 B230 — 2.3 L (2,316 cc) SOHC 8-valve Volvo 240/Volvo 740/Volvo 940
  - 1985–1986 B230F — 9.8:1 compression — 114 hp (85 kW; 116 PS) — U.S. models
  - 1985–1987 B230E — 9.8:1 compression — 131 hp (98 kW; 133 PS)
  - 1988–1993 B230F — 9.8:1 compression — 114 hp (85 kW; 116 PS) — U.S. models
  - 1985-1990 B230ET — 10.3:1 compression — 182 hp (136 kW; 185 PS) — European models
  - 1985–1998 B230FT — 8.7:1 compression — 165 hp (123 kW; 167 PS) — U.S./European models
  - 1993-1995 B230FB — 9.8:1 compression — 136 hp (101 kW; 138 PS) — European models
  - 1994–1998 B230FK — 8.7:1 compression — 135 hp (101 kW; 137 PS) — European models

=== DOHC ===
The line of multi-valve DOHC engines began with the B234 for the 1989 model year.

- 1989–199x B204 — 2.0 L (1,986 cc) DOHC 16-valve — Volvo 740/780/940/960
- 1989–1992 B234 — 2.3 L (2,316 cc) DOHC 16-valve — Volvo 740, Volvo 940

Volkswagen Group diesels

Volvo licensed diesel engines from Volkswagen Group for decades.

- 1979–1986 D20 — 2.0 L (1,986 cc) inline five-cylinder SOHC, 50 kW (68 PS) — Volvo 240 (for Finland and possibly other export markets)
- 1979–1994 D24 — 2.4 L (2,383 cc) inline six-cylinder SOHC, 60 kW (82 PS) — Volvo 240, Volvo 260, Volvo 740
- 1982–1996 D24T — 2.4 L (2,383 cc) inline six-cylinder SOHC, 80–90 kW (109–122 PS) — Volvo 740, Volvo 760, Volvo 780, Volvo 940, Volvo 960
- 1990s–2000 D5252T — 2.5 L (2,461 cc) Audi Turbocharged Direct Injection (TDI) inline five-cylinder SOHC, 103 kW (140 PS; 138 bhp) — Volvo 850, Volvo S70/Volvo V70, early Volvo S80s

=== Volvo V8 ===
Volvo B36, used in trucks

=== Modular ===
Volvo began a line of modular engines in 1990, with straight-four, straight-five, and straight-six variants. In 2016 the last Volvo Modular engine was produced.

- 1993–2002 B52xx — 2.0 L (1,984 cc) /2.3 L (2,319 cc) / 2.4 L (2,435 cc) / 2.5 L (2,521 cc) DOHC
  - 1993–2002 B5202 — 2.0 L (1,984 cc) — Volvo 850,
  - 1993-1997 B5252 — 2.5 L (2,521 cc) — Volvo 850,
  - 1993–2002 B5204 — 2.0 L (1,984 cc) — Volvo 850,
  - 1993–2002 B5234 — 2.3 L (2,319 cc) — Volvo 850, Volvo S60, Volvo S70, Volvo V70, Volvo C70
  - 1998–2009 B5244 — 2.4 L (2,435 cc)
  - 1993– B5254 — 2.5 L (2,521 cc)
- 2000–2002 B41 — 1.9 L (1,948 cc) DOHC — Volvo S40/V40
- B42xx — 1.9 L (1,948 cc) — Volvo S40/V40
- B62xx — 2.5 L (2,473 cc)
  - 1995–1998 B6254 — 2.5 L (2,473 cc) DOHC 24v — Volvo 960 Europe
- 1991–2001 B63xx — 2.9 L (2,922 cc) DOHC 24v — ????
  - 1991–1999 B6304F — 2.9 L (2,922 cc) DOHC 24v — Volvo 960, Volvo S80, Volvo S90, Volvo V90
  - 1995-1998 B6254, B6304, B6304S, B6244
  - 2000–2001 B6304 — 2.9 L (2,922 cc) DOHC 24v — Volvo S80

=== SI6, Short Inline 6 ===
This engine was designed by Volvo in Sweden but is built in Wales, at Ford's Bridgend Engine Plant

- Volvo B6324S Short I6 — 3.2 L (195 cu in)
- Volvo B6304T2 Short I6 — 3.0 L (183 cu in) Turbo

=== VED5, Volvo Engine Diesel 5 ===
- 140 kW (190 PS; 188 hp), 420 N⋅m (310 lb⋅ft), 2.4 liter. In the following vehicles: AWD V60/XC60.
- 162 kW (220 PS; 217 hp), 440 N⋅m (325 lb⋅ft), 2.4 liter. In the following vehicle: AWD XC60.

=== Volvo-Yamaha V8 ===
This V8 engine is designed by Volvo Cars and Yamaha Motor of Japan. The engine is built by Yamaha in Japan, and other parts of the engine are added at Volvo Cars engine unit in Skövde, Sweden.

- Volvo B8444S Volvo/Yamaha V8
