= Steyr-Puch Pinzgauer =

Type of all-terrain vehicle

Pinzgauer High-Mobility All-Terrain Vehicle
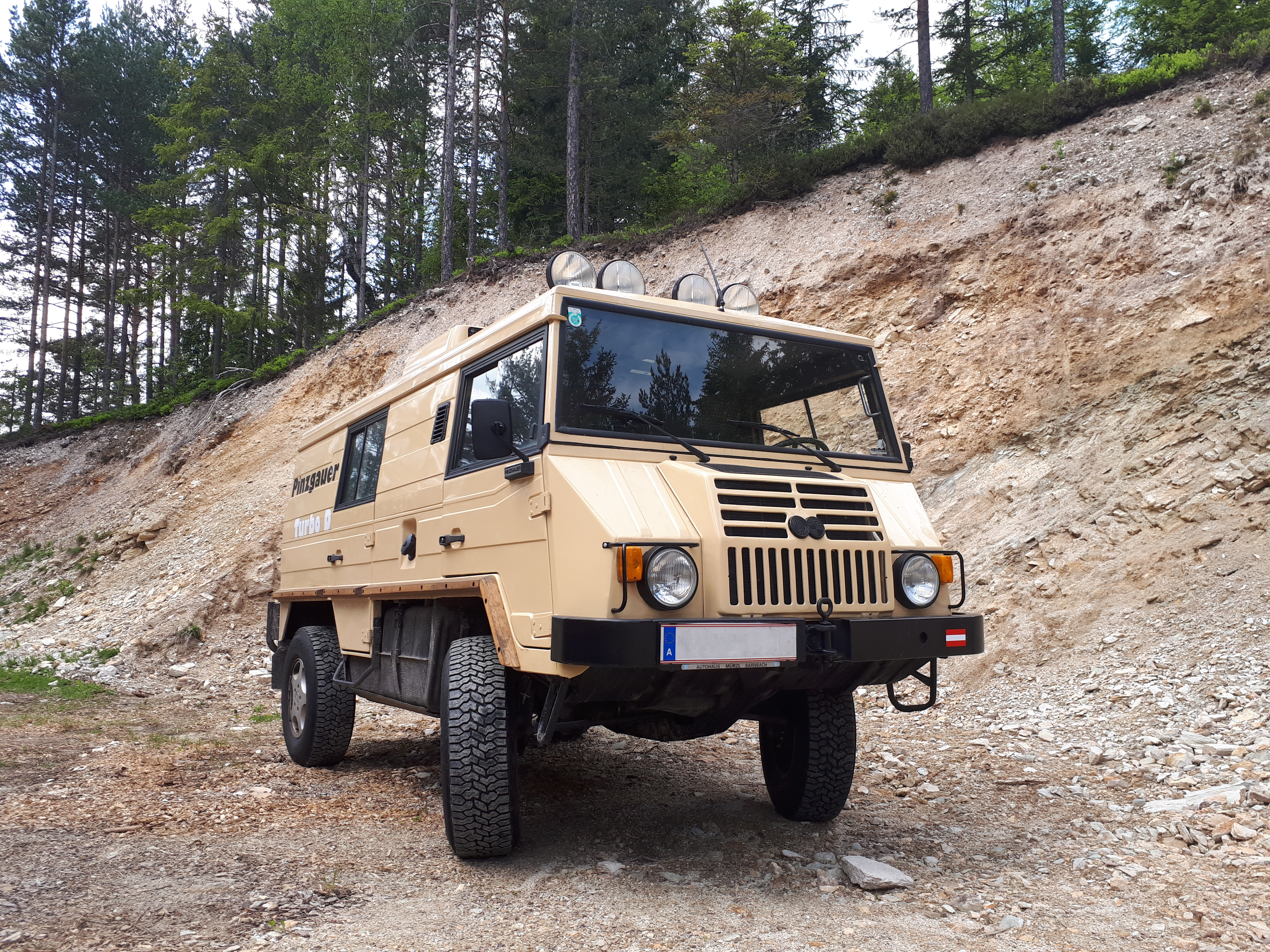
- Pinzgauer Turbo D Version
- Type: All-wheel drive vehicle
- Place of origin: Austria; United Kingdom

Production history
- Manufacturer: Steyr-Daimler-Puch: 1971–2000; BAE Systems Inc. 2000–2007
- Produced: 1971–2007

Specifications
- Crew: driver, co-driver +8/12 passengers (710M); driver + 4 passengers (710K)
- Engine: Inline 4-cylinder Steyr-designed petrol/gasoline engine, or inline 5- or inline 6-cylinder diesel engine 65 kW (88 PS; 87 bhp)
- Payload capacity: 2.5 tonnes
- Transmission: 5-speed manual 4-speed automatic (Pinzgauer II)
- Suspension: 4- or 6-wheel drive
- Operational range: 400 km (249 mi)
- Maximum speed: 4×4: 110 km/h (68 mph) / 6×6: 100 km/h (62 mph)

The Pinzgauer is a family of high-mobility all-terrain 4WD (4×4) and 6WD (6×6) military utility vehicles. The vehicle was originally developed in the late 1960s and manufactured by Steyr-Daimler-Puch of Graz, Austria, and was named after the Pinzgauer, an Austrian breed of cattle. They were most recently manufactured at Guildford, Surrey, England, by BAE Systems Land & Armaments. It was popular amongst military buyers, with production continuing until 2007.

In 2000 the rights to the desk were sold to Automotive Technik Ltd (ATL) in the UK. ATL was acquired by Stewart & Stevenson Services, Inc. in 2005. In May 2006, Stewart & Stevenson became a subsidiary of the aerospace and defence group Armor Holdings, Inc. In 2007 Armor Holdings was acquired by BAE Systems plc, who discontinued UK production of the Pinzgauer, which was proving to be vulnerable to mines and improvised explosive devices in Afghanistan. Production ceased around 2009. Development work (done in the UK) on a planned Pinzgauer II was evaluated by a BAE subsidiary in Benoni, Gauteng, South Africa, but no vehicle was ever made.

Being both unarmed and unarmoured, the Pinzgauer was designed for mobility and general utility functions rather than combat or reconnaissance roles.

== First generation ==
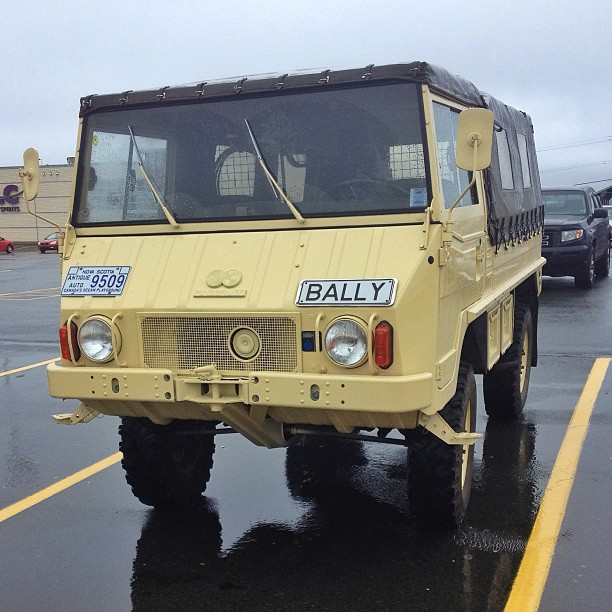
A Pinzgauer High-Mobility All-Terrain Vehicle

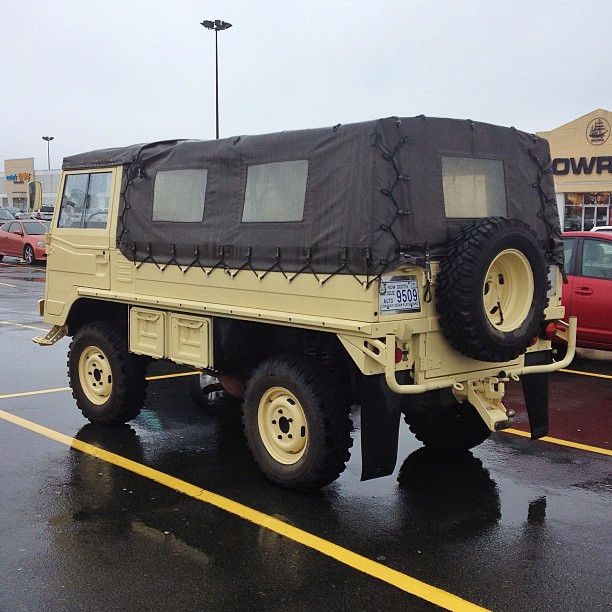
A Pinzgauer High-Mobility All-Terrain Vehicle

The original prototype was developed around 1969 and production began in 1971, as successor of the Steyr-Daimler-Puch Haflinger 700 AP 4×4 light military multi purpose offroad vehicle. The Pinzgauer first generation model (710, 712) was produced until 2000 by Steyr-Daimler-Puch in the city of Graz, Austria.

It was, and is, in use in many armies around the world, like Austria, Switzerland, the United Kingdom, Saudi Arabia, Thailand, Albania, and Bolivia. When Austro-Canadian millionaire Frank Stronach took over the shareholder majority of Steyr-Daimler-Puch offroad vehicles, the rights to build Steyr's Pinzgauers were moved to Automotive Technik Ltd; and subsequently to a branch of BAE Systems. As of 2009, production of Pinzgauers seems to have stalled. The Graz plant has been building the Mercedes-Benz G Wagon / Puch G SUVs / offroad cars.

The Pinzgauer is one of the most capable all-terrain vehicles ever made. While not as fast on-road (110 kilometres per hour (68 mph)) as an American Humvee, it can carry more troops, and move faster over rough trails. Even the smaller 710M can carry 10 people or two NATO pallets. Both the 4×4 and 6×6 models can tow 5,000 kilograms (11,023 lb) on road; and 1,500 kilograms (3,307 lb) or 1,800 kilograms (3,968 lb), respectively, off-road. It has a range of over 400 kilometres (249 mi) on one tank of fuel, or nearly 700 kilometres (435 mi) with the optional 125 litre tank. The first generation Pinzgauer is available in both four-wheel drive (4×4) (model 710) and six-wheel drive (6×6) (model 712) versions.

The Pinzgauer was designed to be reliable and easy to fix; it is shipped with an air-cooled petrol engine with dual-Zenith 36 mm NDIX carburetors. The engine in the Pinzgauer was specifically designed for the vehicle; it has more than one oil pump so that the engine will not get starved of oil no matter how the vehicle is oriented.

The Pinzgauer has a chassis design which contributes to its high mobility. It has a central-tube chassis with a transaxle which distributes the weight more evenly, and keeps the centre of gravity as low as possible. The differentials are all sealed units and require minimal additional lubrication. The Pinzgauer also has portal axles, like the Unimog, to provide extra clearance over obstacles. The 710 4×4 was the more popular variant, but the Pinzgauer was designed to have a very capable 6×6 configuration from the start. The rear suspension on the back of the 6×6 712 is designed to provide maximum traction in the most demanding circumstances along with increasing its towing, load carrying, and off-road abilities.

During production from 1971 until 1985, 18,349 first-generation 710s and 712s were produced and sold to both civilian and military customers.

=== Variants ===
==== 710 model, 4×4 ====
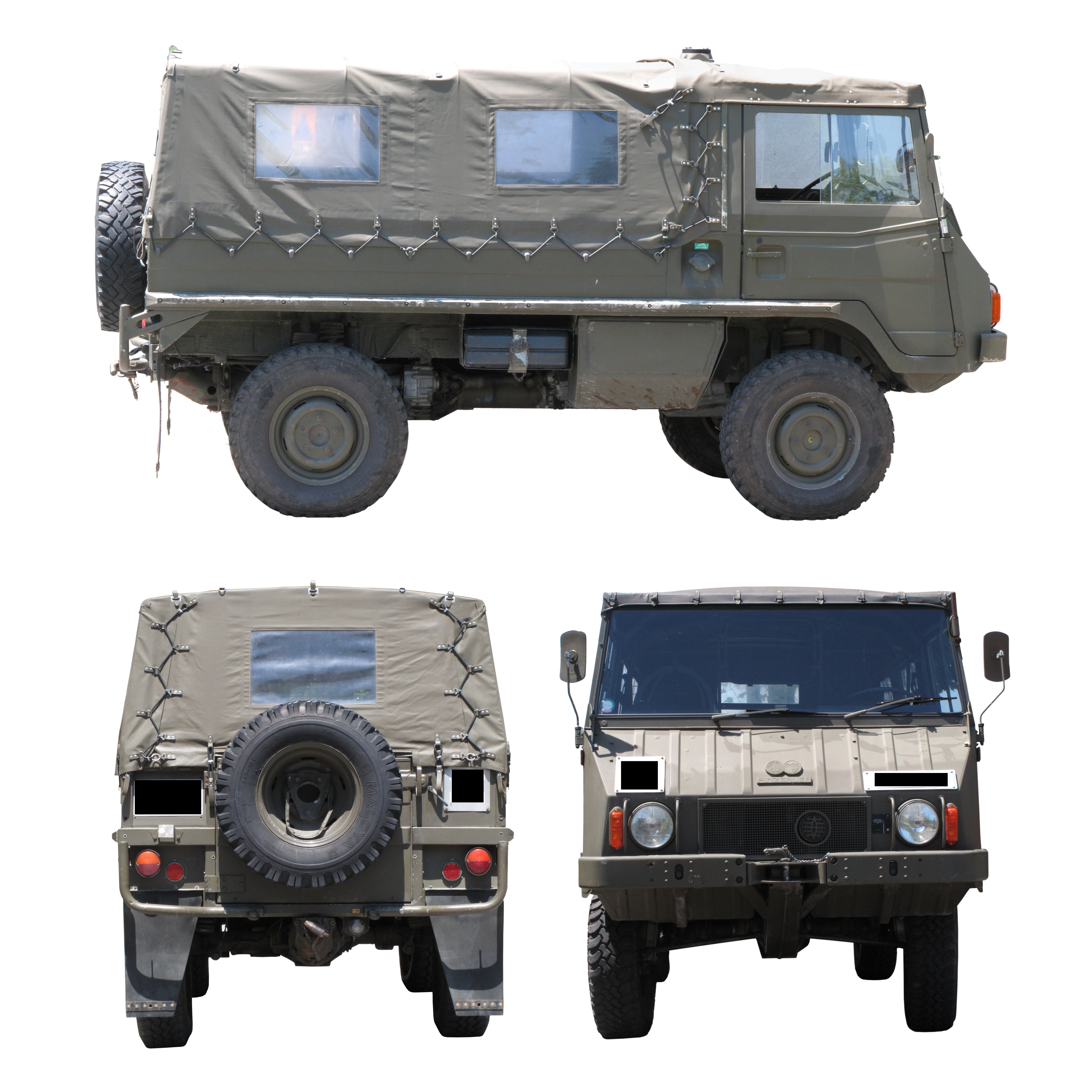
A Pinzgauer 710M 4×4 model

| M | soft top with rear passenger seats (10 passenger total) |
| T | flat bed carrier |
| K | 5 door hard top station wagon (5 passenger total) |
| AMB-Y | ambulance with 3 doors |
| AMB-S | ambulance with air-portable removable shelter |

==== 712 model, 6×6 ====
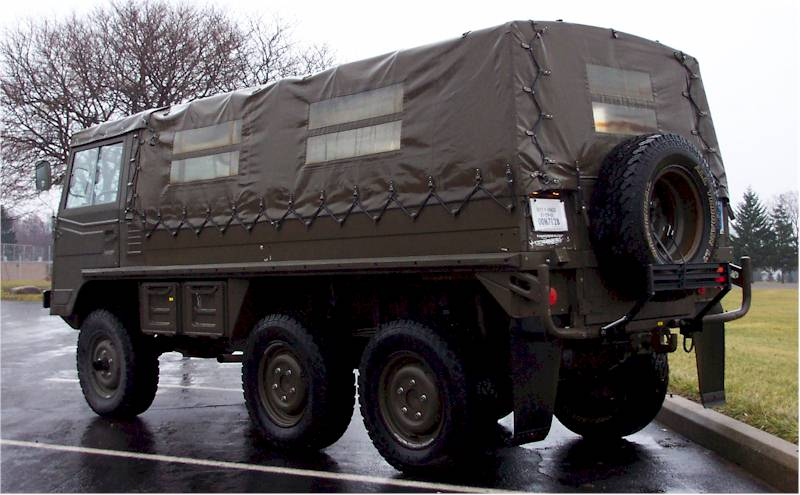
A Pinzgauer 712M 6×6 model

| M | soft top with rear passenger seats |
| T | flat top carrier |
| FW | fire truck |
| K | 5-door station wagon |
| W | workshop with air-portable shelter |
| DK | 4-door crew cab pickup |
| AMB-S | ambulance, with air-portable removable shelter |

The most common body types are either "K" (hard-topped) or "M" (soft-topped) types.

=== Specifications ===
All the first generation Pinzgauers are equipped with:

- 2.5 litre inline four-cylinder air-cooled engine. An exception was made on certain 712 variants towards the end of production that came with a 2.7-litre air-cooled four-cylinder engine. This was primarily on ambulances.
  - DIN rated motive power: 65 kilowatts (88 PS; 87 bhp) (105 hp SAE)
  - Torque: 180 newton-metres (133 lbf⋅ft)
- Five-speed manual transmission with two-speed transfer case
- four-wheel-drive or six-wheel-drive with on-the-fly hydraulic differential locks
- Fully independent suspension
- Backbone chassis tube
- Integrated differentials
- 24 volt electrical system
- Vacuum assisted drum brakes
- Portal axles to give extra clearance

== Second generation ==
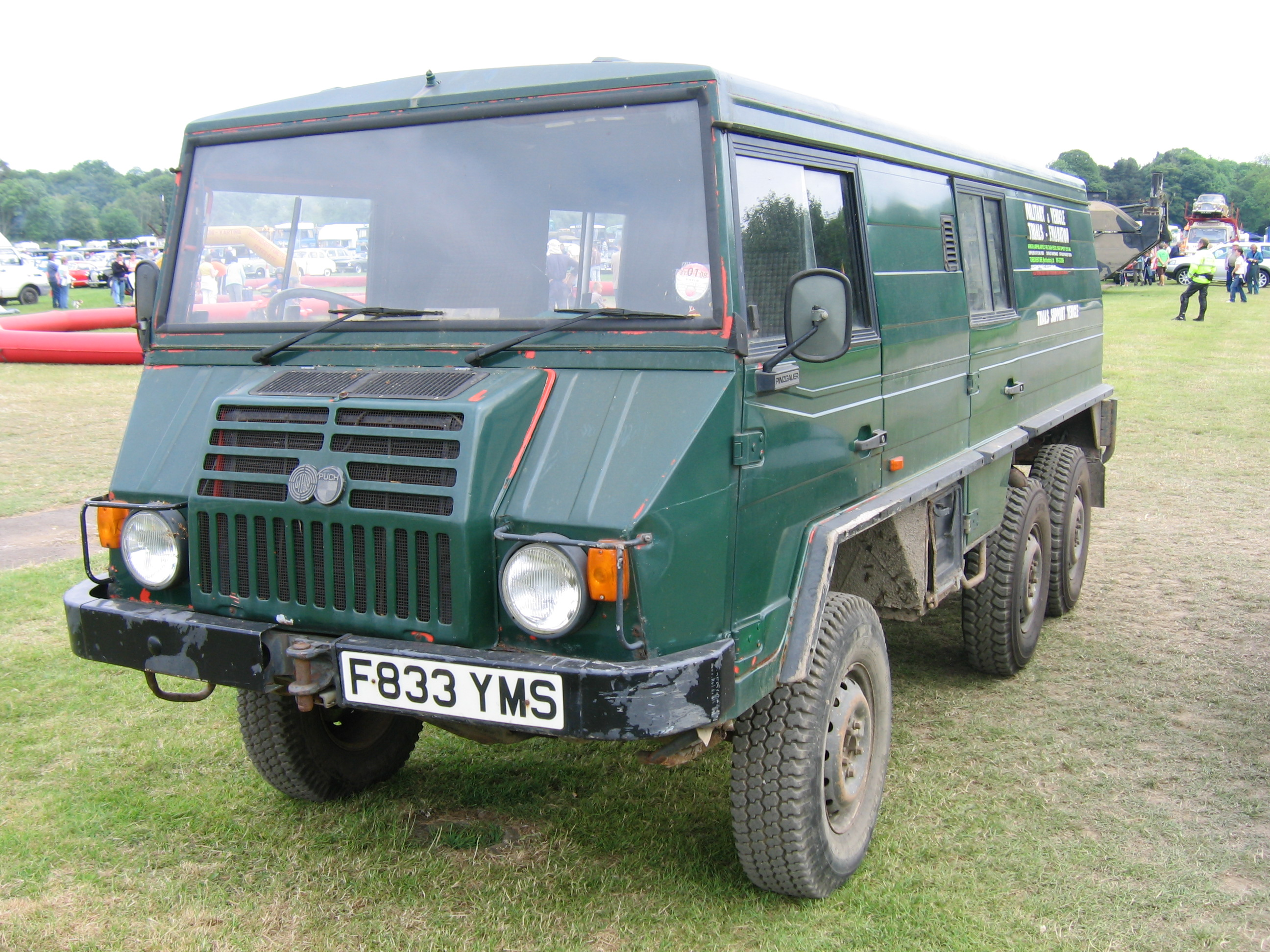
A Pinzgauer 718K

In 1980, Steyr-Daimler-Puch started development on a second-generation Pinzgauer. After six years of research and development, the initial second generation Pinzgauer II rolled off the assembly line in 1986. In 2000, Magna, who bought Steyr-Daimler-Puch, sold its rights to the Pinzgauer to Automotive Technik in the UK who took over production of the Pinzgauer. The Pinzgauer is now owned and produced by BAE Systems Land Systems in Guildford, Surrey, however production has ceased.

The four-wheel drive (4×4) model is now called a 716, and the six-wheel drive (6×6) model is now called a 718. The same letter body type designations apply. The new 716 has the same payload rating as the old 712, and the new 718 also has a similarly higher payload capacity.

There were a few minor changes to the design of the Pinzgauer II:

- Inline six-cylinder Volkswagen Group Turbocharged diesel engine model D24T
- ZF Friedrichshafen four-speed automatic transmission, or five-speed manual transmission
- Slightly wider track
- Slightly bigger tyres
- Disc brakes
- Standard automatic transmission, with optional manual transmission

The second generation motor vehicle went through several minor revisions through its life, unlike the first generation which used the same design throughout production. The first second-generation Pinzgauers were designated P80 (1980). It went through a minor revision in 1990 (P90), and 1993 (P93), when an intercooler version of the VW engine (D24TIC) was substituted. A more significant engine change was carried out in 2002 when a new Volkswagen Group Turbocharged Direct Injection (TDI) engine was introduced to meet the new Euro3 emissions requirements.

== Worldwide markets ==
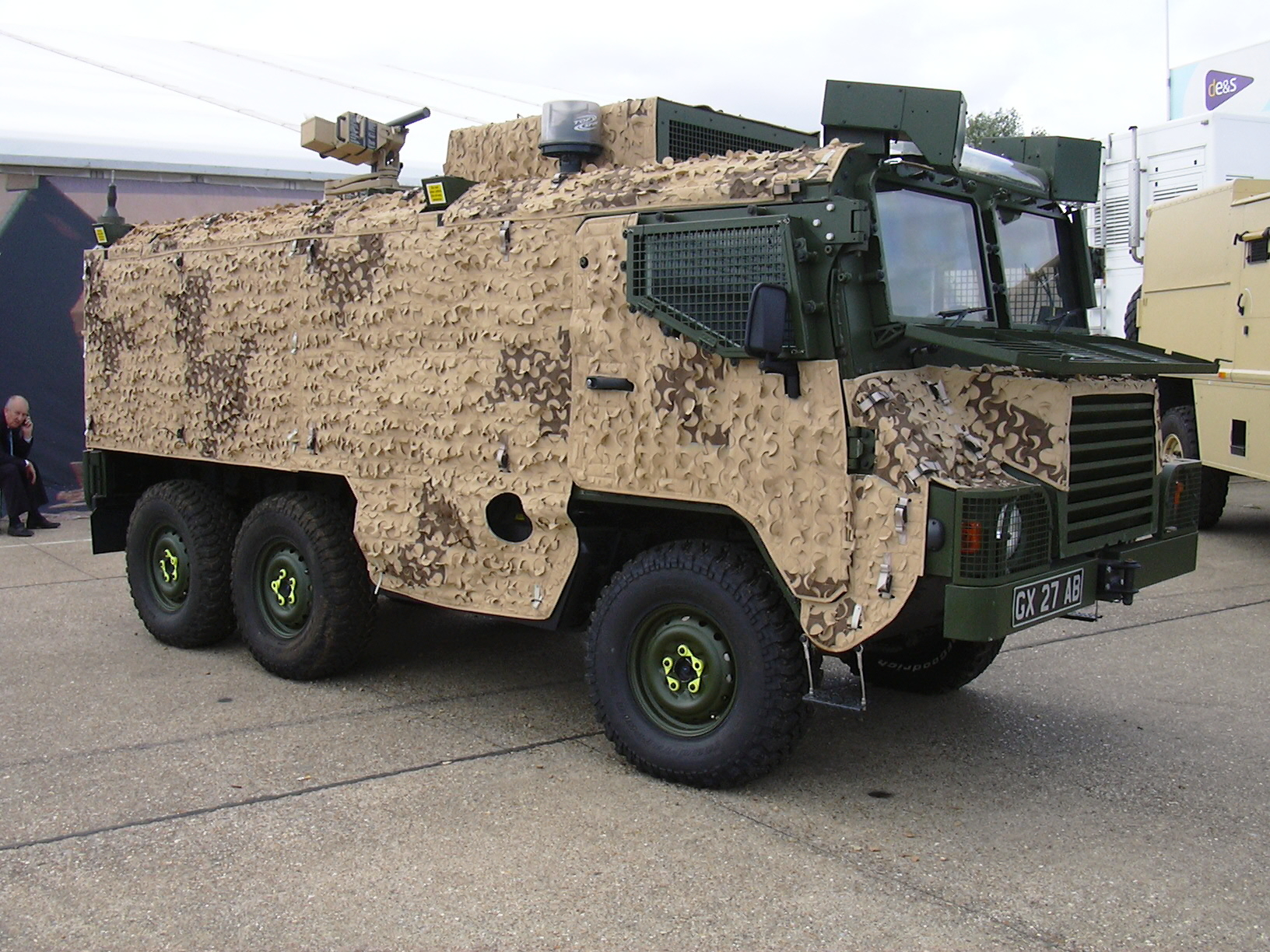
A British Army Pinzgauer Vector

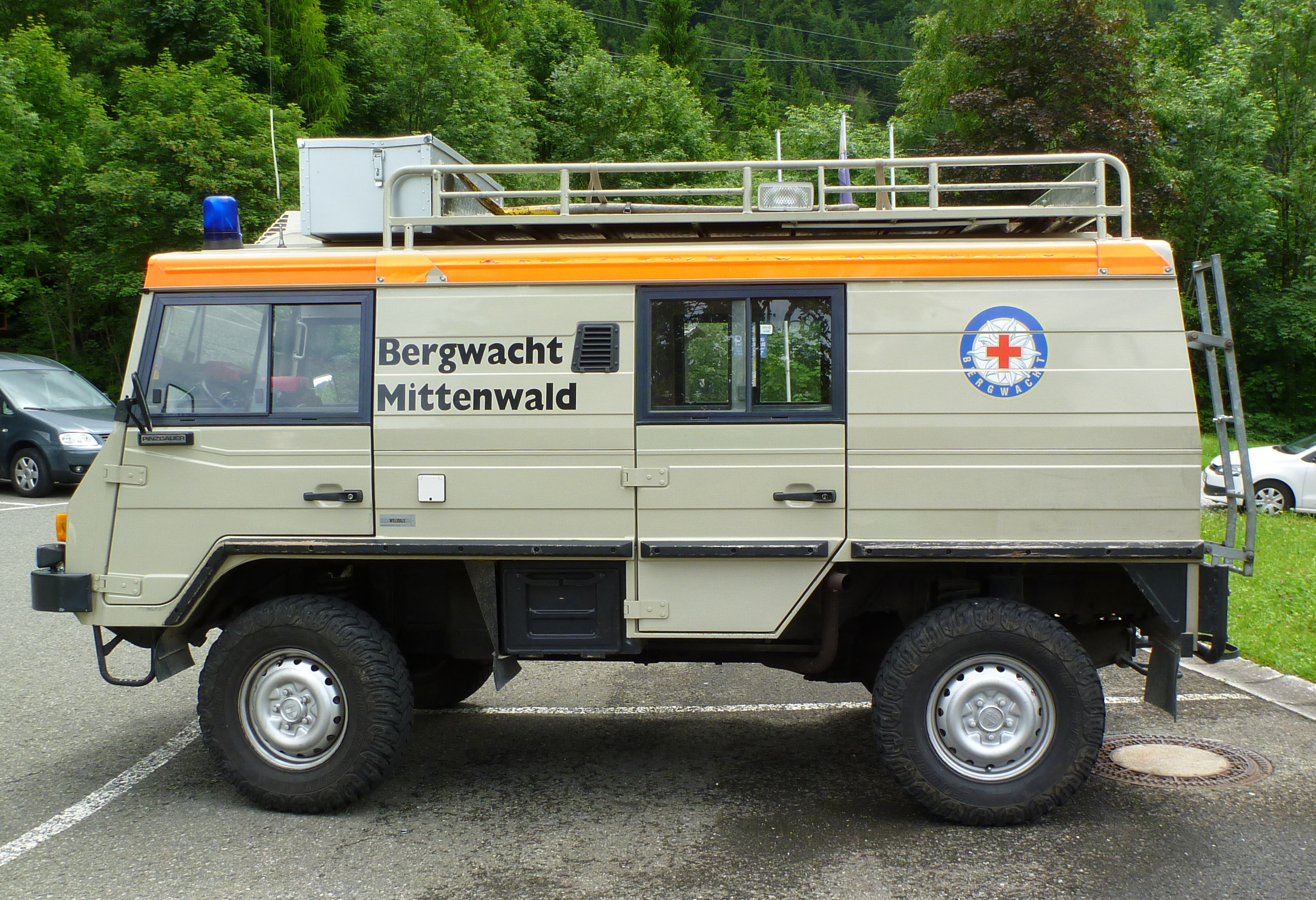
A Pinzgauer of the Bergwacht (Mountain Rescue) in Mittenwald in the Bavarian Alps, which is rarely used for this purpose in Germany

The Pinzgauer (or Pinz as it is known to most British soldiers) is more common as a utility vehicle in Royal Artillery units due to its employment as a light gun tractor.

A new lightly-armoured version called the "Vector" briefly entered service in the British Army in early 2007, as part of an effort to provide safer patrol vehicles for troops in Afghanistan. The 6×6 Vector PPV (Protected Patrol Vehicle) would, according to the manufacturer, "Build on the existing proven design, with enhancements that will include a combination of physical protection, as well as the use of sophisticated electronic counter measures to maximise survivability while on patrol". However, the Vector PPV was found to have unreliable suspension and wheel hubs as well as poor protection against improvised explosive devices. It quickly lost the confidence of field commanders and was withdrawn from service.

The Pinzgauer is the basis for the Tactical Ground Station (TGS) element of the Raytheon Systems Limited Airborne Standoff Radar (ASTOR). The TGS comprises two workstation vehicles, a mission support vehicle, and a standard utility vehicle.

Many Pinzgauers were sold to military forces (initially Austrian and Swiss) to be used as non-tactical utility vehicles. Typical military roles are as general-purpose utility truck, command vehicles, troop carrier, ambulance, and tow vehicle. Roles very similar to other civilian sourced vehicles like Land Rover in the UK, the Blazer CUCV in the US, and the Mercedes G in many European countries.

Yugoslavia bought 3975 Pinzgauers from 1971 in all variants 4x4 and 6x6.

The New Zealand Army has purchased 321 Pinzgauer vehicles in 8 variants to fulfill the Light Operational Vehicle (LOV) role.

The Malaysian Army purchased 168 2 Ton 4×4 716 Gun Tractors and 164 2 Ton 6×6 718 Mortar Transporters to replace older Volvo C303 and C304 in their inventories. It is affectionately called "Piglet" due to its design.

The US Army purchased 20 Turbo Diesel 718M during the early 1990s, imported for the Army’s Delta Force as a deep reconnaissance platform. They were used in the 1991 Gulf War as well as the 2003 Iraq war, and eventually phased out at 2010–2011.

The Pinzgauer was marketed to the civilian marketplace worldwide for use as campers, farm trucks, ambulances, fire-trucks, and rescue vehicles. Likewise, many ended up being used as tourist vans due to their large passenger capacity and stable, reliable platform.

Pinzgauers have been used as tourist transports in Africa, Australia, South America, Hawaii, and other exotic locales. Some are still in use today. The Navajo Nation has a small fleet of these for tourist transport within Canyon de Chelly in Arizona, still in use in 2024.

Pinzgauers were marketed to- and used extensively by energy companies for oil exploration purposes. A few Pinzgauers were used for off-road racing, including the famous Paris to Dakar Rally and the International Rainforest Challenge in Malaysia.

== Military users ==
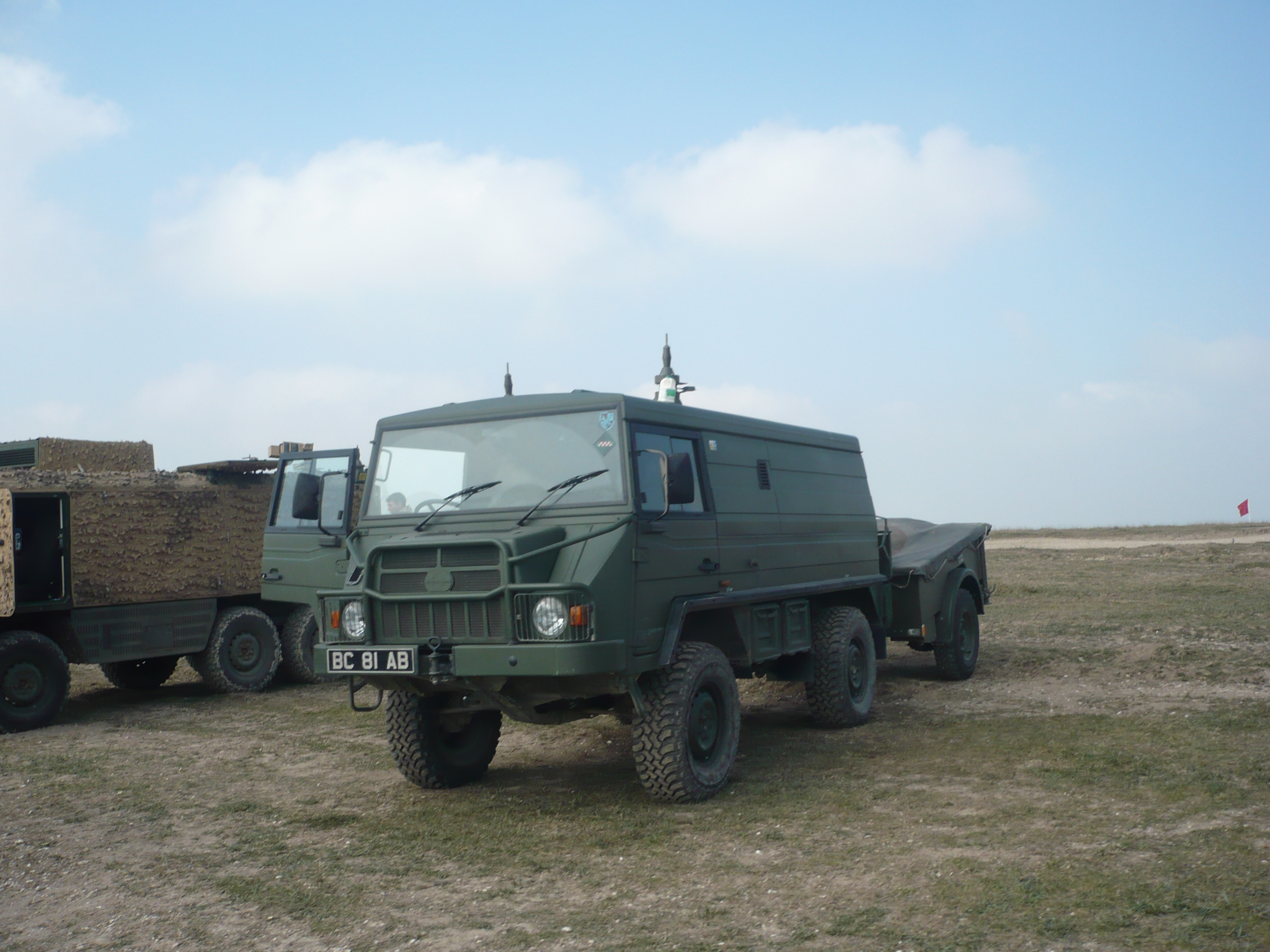
A Pinzgauer of the British Army

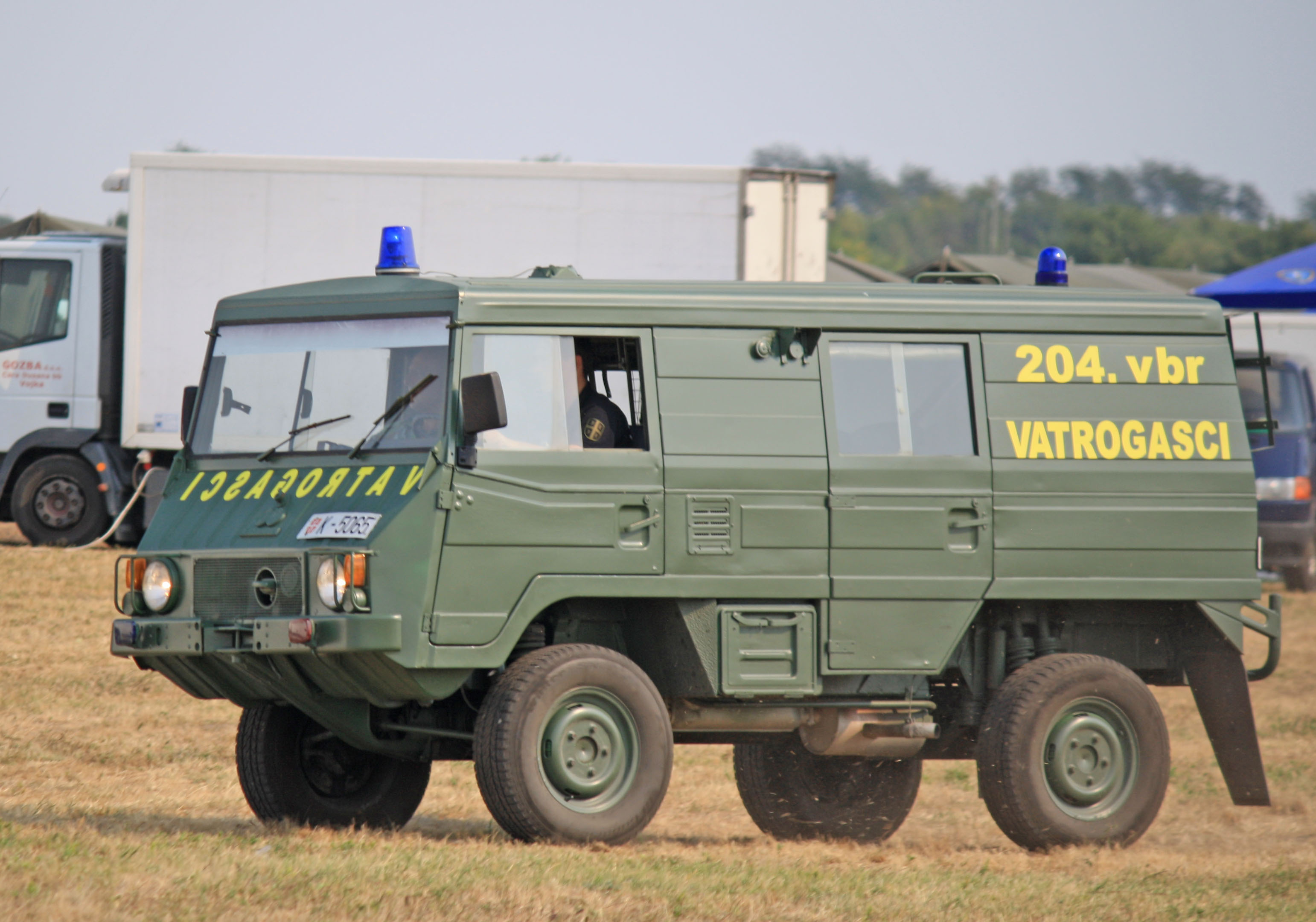
A Pinzgauer fire engine of the Serbian Air Force 204th Air Brigade Fire department at Batajnica Air Base

Military users include:

- Argentina
- Austria
- Bolivia
- Croatia
- Cyprus
- Eswatini
- Ghana
- Jordan
- Lebanon
- Lithuania
- Malaysia
- Montenegro
- New Zealand
- Nigeria
- North Macedonia
- Oman
- Pakistan
- Saudi Arabia
- Serbia
- Seychelles
- Sudan – Transitional Sovereignty Council
- Switzerland
- Thailand
- Tunisia
- United Kingdom
- United States
- Ukraine – Pinzgauer Vector: at least three armored ambulances and at least eight APCs as of June 2022
- Venezuela

=== Former users ===
- Argentina – National Reorganization Process
- Republic of Bolivia (1964–1982) / Republic of Bolivia (1982–2010)
- Republic of Cyprus (Flag 1960–2006)
- Republic of Macedonia / Macedonia
- Military dictatorship in Nigeria
- Sultanate of Oman (1970–1995)
- Republic of Seychelles
- Republic of Sudan (1985–2019) / Sudanese transition to democracy (2019–2021)
- (Eswatini) Kingdom of Swaziland
- Yugoslavia / Federal Republic of Yugoslavia / Serbia and Montenegro
- Republic of Venezuela

== Pinzgauer capabilities ==
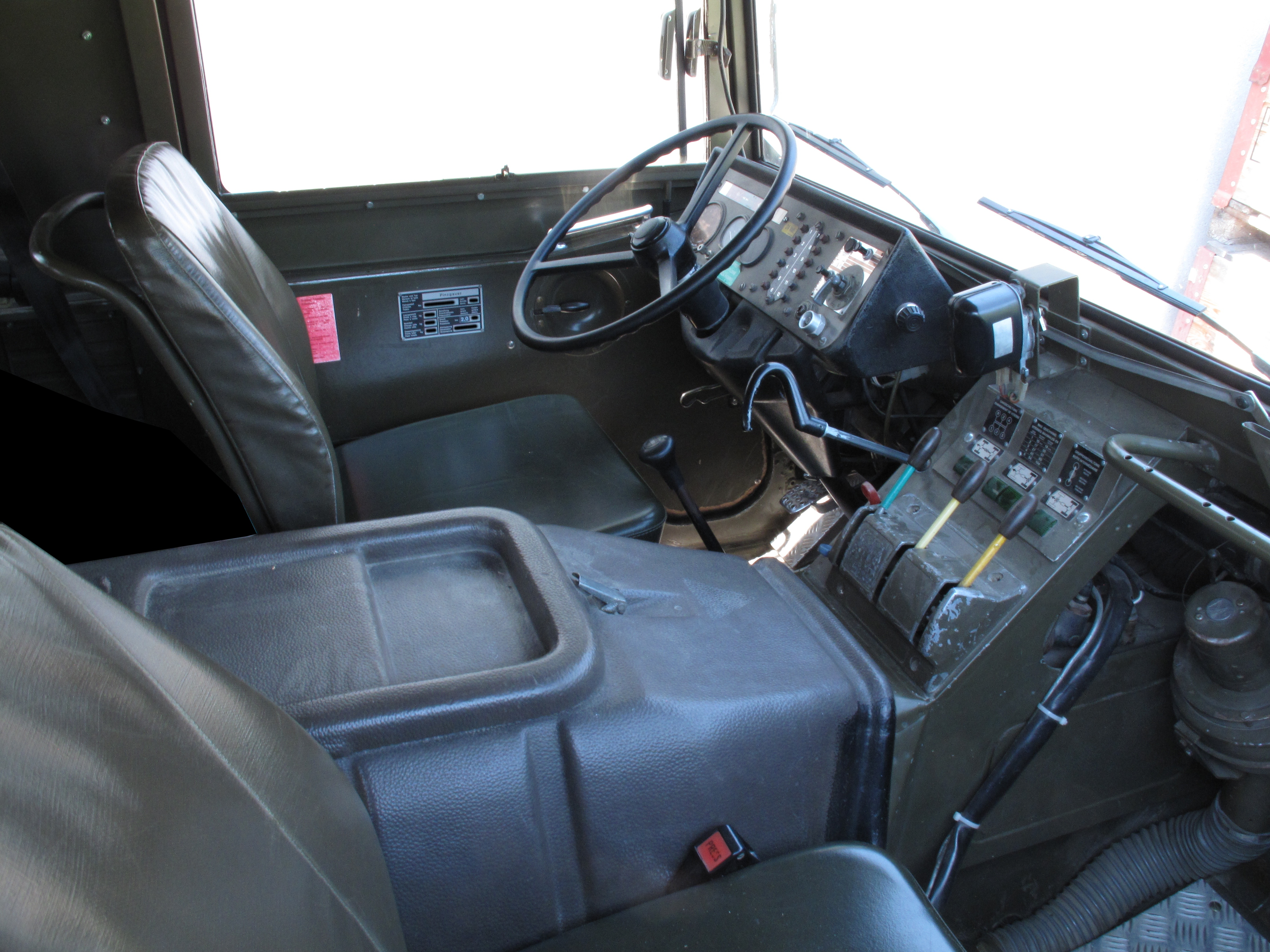
A Pinzgauer cockpit

The Pinzgauer is a highly accomplished off-road vehicle. Its capabilities, in some operational scenarios, are better than that of the Humvee and the Land Rover Defender.

- 38°/45° approach and departure angles
- 100% slope, or until tyres lose traction
- 700 millimetres (27.6 in) fording depth
- 335 millimetres (13.2 in) of ground clearance (lowest point when fully loaded)
- Can climb down a 360 millimetres (14.2 in) wall
- 43.5° side-slope
- 1000/1500 kg of payload (4×4/6×6)
- top speed
  - (710 – 4×4): 110 kilometres per hour (68 mph)
  - (712 – 6×6): 100 kilometres per hour (62 mph)
  - (716 – 4×4): 125 kilometres per hour (78 mph)
  - (718 – 6×6): 115 kilometres per hour (71 mph)
- Full engine power available for 710/712 at 4 kilometres per hour (2 mph)
- M body type carries 10 people (4×4), 14 people (6×6)

== Production ==
| Year | Production figures | Model 710 | Model 712 | Turbo D Model 716, 718 |
|---|---|---|---|---|
| 1965 | 1 | | | 0 |
| 1966 | 0 | | | 0 |
| 1967 | 10 | | | 0 |
| 1968 | 0 | | | 0 |
| 1969 | 8 | | | 0 |
| 1970 | 0 | | | 0 |
| 1971 | 167 | | | 0 |
| 1972 | 927 | | | 0 |
| 1973 | 1,443 | | | 0 |
| 1974 | 1,750 | | | 0 |
| 1975 | 2,006 | | | 0 |
| 1976 | 2,430 | | | 0 |
| 1977 | 1,445 | | | 0 |
| 1978 | 611 | 444 | 167 | 0 |
| 1979 | 946 | 799 | 147 | 0 |
| 1980 | 1,294 | 933 | 361 | 0 |
| 1981 | 892 | 312 | 580 | 0 |
| 1982 | 1,744 | 856 | 888 | 0 |
| 1983 | 1,626 | 649 | 977 | 0 |
| 1984 | 652 | 185 | 467 | 0 |
| 1985 | 422 | 90 | 326 | 6 |
| 1986 | 65 | | | |
| 1987 | 308 | | | |
| 1988 | 629 | | | |
| 1989 | 131 | | | |
| 1990 | 687 | | | |
| 1991 | | | | |
| 1992 | | | | |
| 1993 | | | | |
| 1994 | | | | |
| 1995 | | | | |
| 1996 | | | | |
| 1997 | | | | |
| 1998 | | | | |
| 1999 | | | | |
| 2000 | | | | |
| Sum | 20,194 (until 1990) ~ 30,000 (until 2000) | | | 5,215 |

== See also ==
- Steyr-Puch Haflinger
- Humvee (HMMWV)
- Jeep J8
- Land Rover Wolf
- Land Rover 101 Forward Control
- Mercedes-Benz G-Class
- Toyota Mega Cruiser
- Toyota Type 73 medium truck
- UAZ-469
- Unimog
- Volvo C303
- LuAZ-969/LuAZ-967 "Volyn"

== Bibliography ==
- Foss, Christopher F.; Gander, Terry J., eds. (1999). Jane's Military Vehicles and Logistics, 1999-2000 (20th ed.). Jane's Information Group. ISBN 978-0-7106-1912-9.
