= Volvo 700 Series =

Range of executive cars

Volvo 700 series
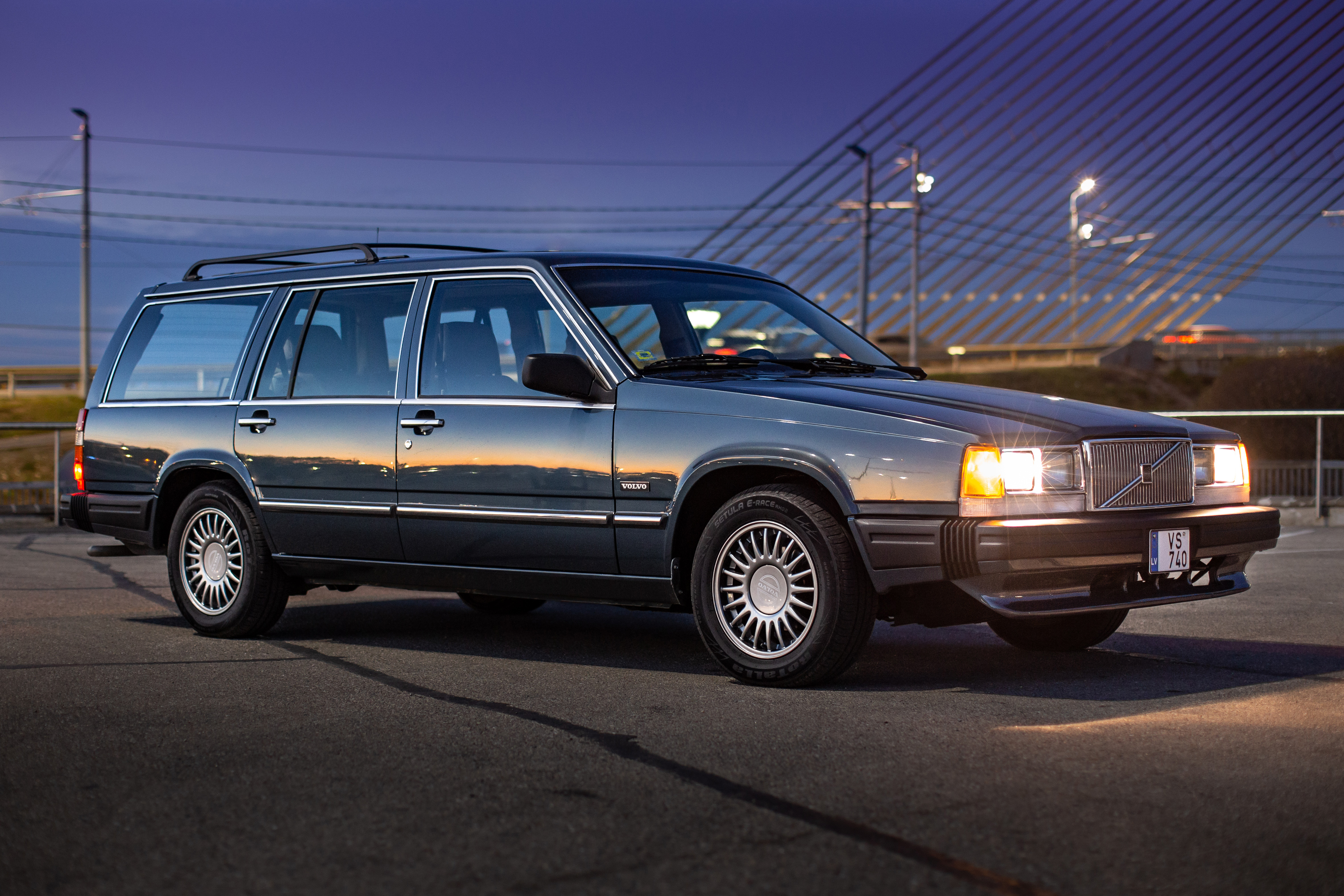
- Volvo 740 GL Estate

Overview
- Manufacturer: Volvo Cars
- Production: 1982–1992 (1,430,000 units)
- Assembly: Sweden: Gothenburg; Kalmar (VKA); Uddevalla (Auto Nova Plant); Belgium: Ghent (VCG); Canada: Halifax (VHA); Australia: Clayton; Indonesia: North Jakarta (PT. ISMAC) (Note: Cars sold in Indonesia during 1974–1999 were assembled locally.)

Body and chassis
- Class: Mid-size luxury / Executive car (E)
- Layout: FR layout

Chronology
- Predecessor: Volvo 200 Series (which continued)
- Successor: Volvo 900 Series

The Volvo 700 series is a range of executive cars produced by the Swedish manufacturer Volvo Cars from 1982 to 1992. The 700 series was introduced in 1982 with the premium 760 models, followed two years later by the more basic 740s, which benefited from the 760's prestige, while sharing the same bodywork. The 700 series was then gradually replaced, beginning in 1990, by the 900 series. The 700, designed by Jan Wilsgaard, was originally to have been a replacement for the 200 series, but production of that model continued until the early nineties. The expensive 780, a Bertone-designed coupé version, entered production in 1986 and departed without a direct successor only four years later.

The most visible differences between the 700 and 900 series were the much more sloping rear greenhouse (sedans), instead of the extremely square, formal, upright C-pillars of the 740s and 760s; more rounded corners on the 900's bodies, and a somewhat better-appointed interior. The 700 series came to an end in late 1992 when the last 740s were built (although they were considered to be of model year 1993). The range had been augmented and finally supplanted by the Volvo 900 in 1993, with the last of the 900s being sold in 1998.

== Volvo 740 ==
Volvo 740
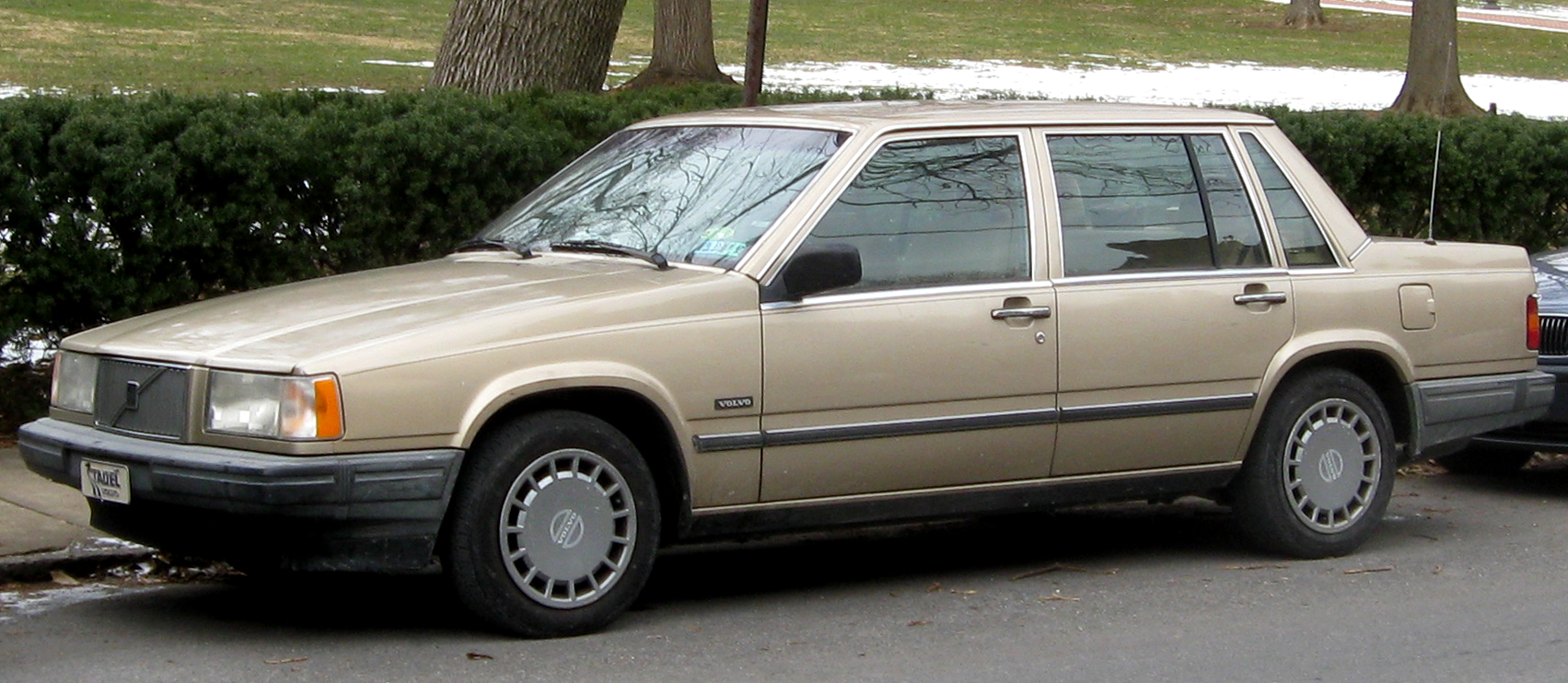

Overview
- Production: 1984–1992
- Designer: Jan Wilsgaard

Body and chassis
- Body style: 4-door saloon; 5-door estate

Powertrain
- Engine: Petrol: 2.0 L B19/B200 I4; 2.0 L B204 16V I4; 2.0 L B19/B200T turbo I4; 2.0 L B204FT 16V turbo I4; 2.3 L B23/B230 I4; 2.3 L B234 16V I4; 2.3 L B23/B230ET/FT turbo I4; Diesel: 2.4 L D24 I6; 2.4 L D24T td I6
- Transmission: 4-speed Volvo M46 manual; 5-speed Volvo M47 manual; 4-speed automatic

Dimensions
- Wheelbase: 2,770 mm (109.1 in)
- Length: 4,800 mm (189.0 in) (1982–1986); 4,785 mm (188.4 in) (1987–1989); 4,850 mm (190.9 in) (1990–1991); 4,808 mm (189.3 in) (1992–1994)
- Width: 1,750 mm (68.9 in) (1982–1986); 1,760 mm (69.3 in) (1987–1994)
- Height: saloon: 1,410 mm (55.5 in); estate: 1,435 mm (56.5 in)
- Curb weight: saloon: 1,315–1,404 kg (2,899–3,095 lb) estate: 1,371–1,458 kg (3,023–3,214 lb)

Introduced in early 1984 (in the U.S. and Australia for the 1985 model year), the 740 arrived nearly two years after the luxurious 760. It was the lower-end version of the original 760, intended to be a mid-size car that offered more style, performance, space and luxury than the 200 series. The '4' in the middle of the Volvo model name had once signified a four-cylinder engine, but by the time of the introduction of the 740 it simply meant less luxurious equipment as four- and six-cylinder engines were fitted across both ranges. The 740 was available as a four-door sedan (sometimes referred to as the 744) and a five-door station wagon (also known as the 745). The station wagon premiered simultaneously at the 1985 Toronto and Chicago auto shows in early February 1985. The wagon was aimed squarely at the North American markets and only went on sale in Europe several months later, in the fall of 1985.

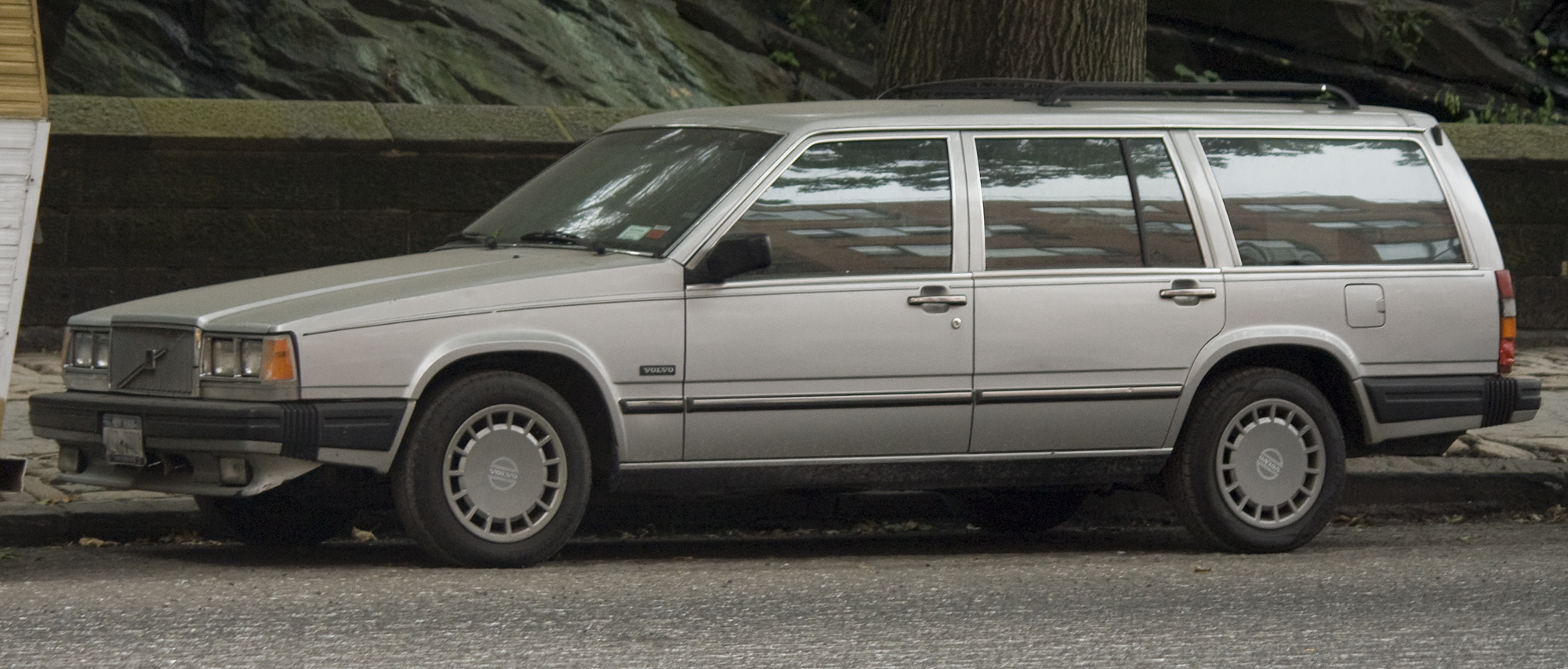
Volvo 740 GLE estate pre-facelift (US)

The Volvo 740 was a popular choice as a police car in several parts of Europe, especially so with the police in Scandinavian countries.

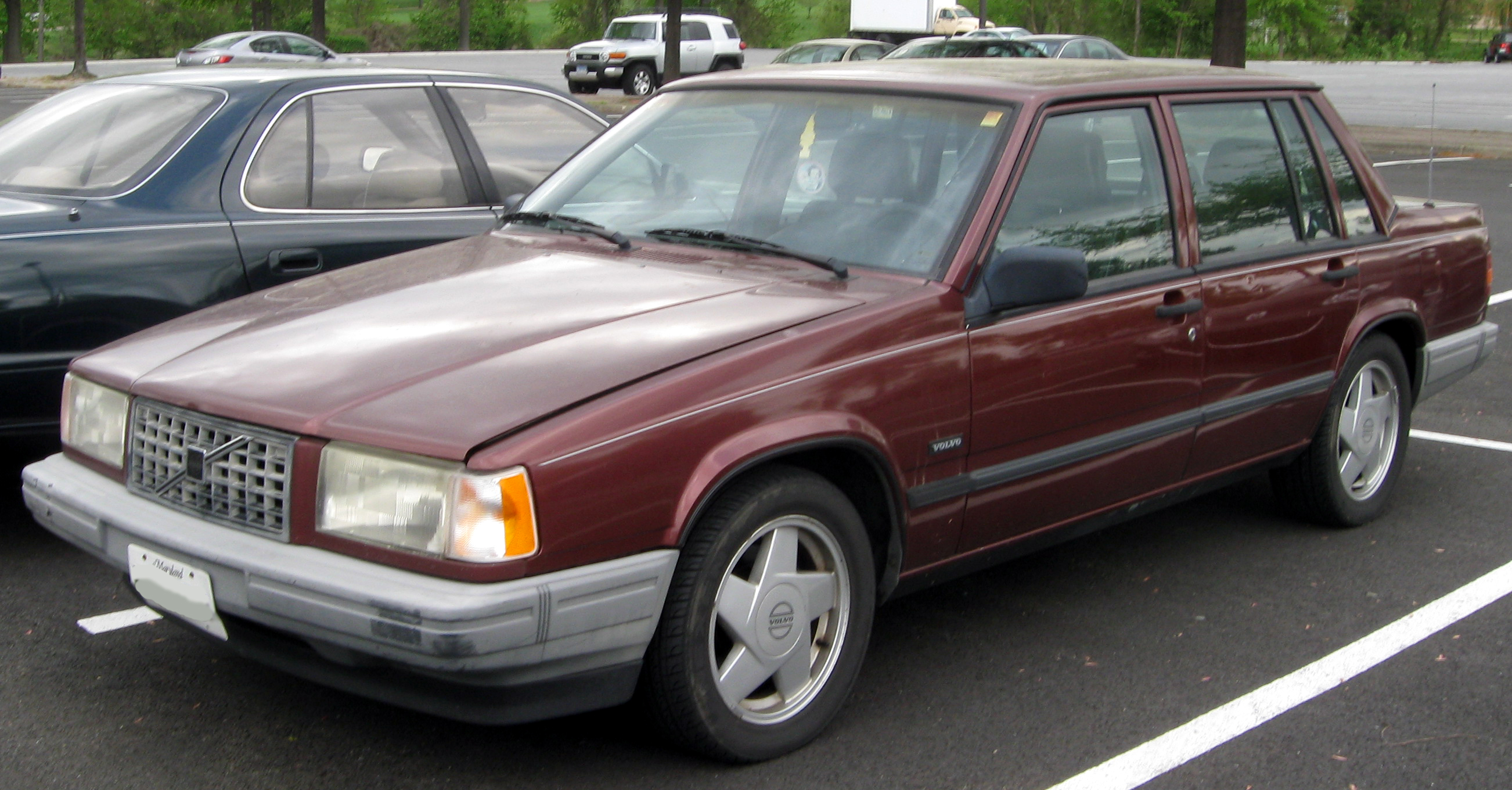
Volvo 740 Turbo saloon post facelift (US)

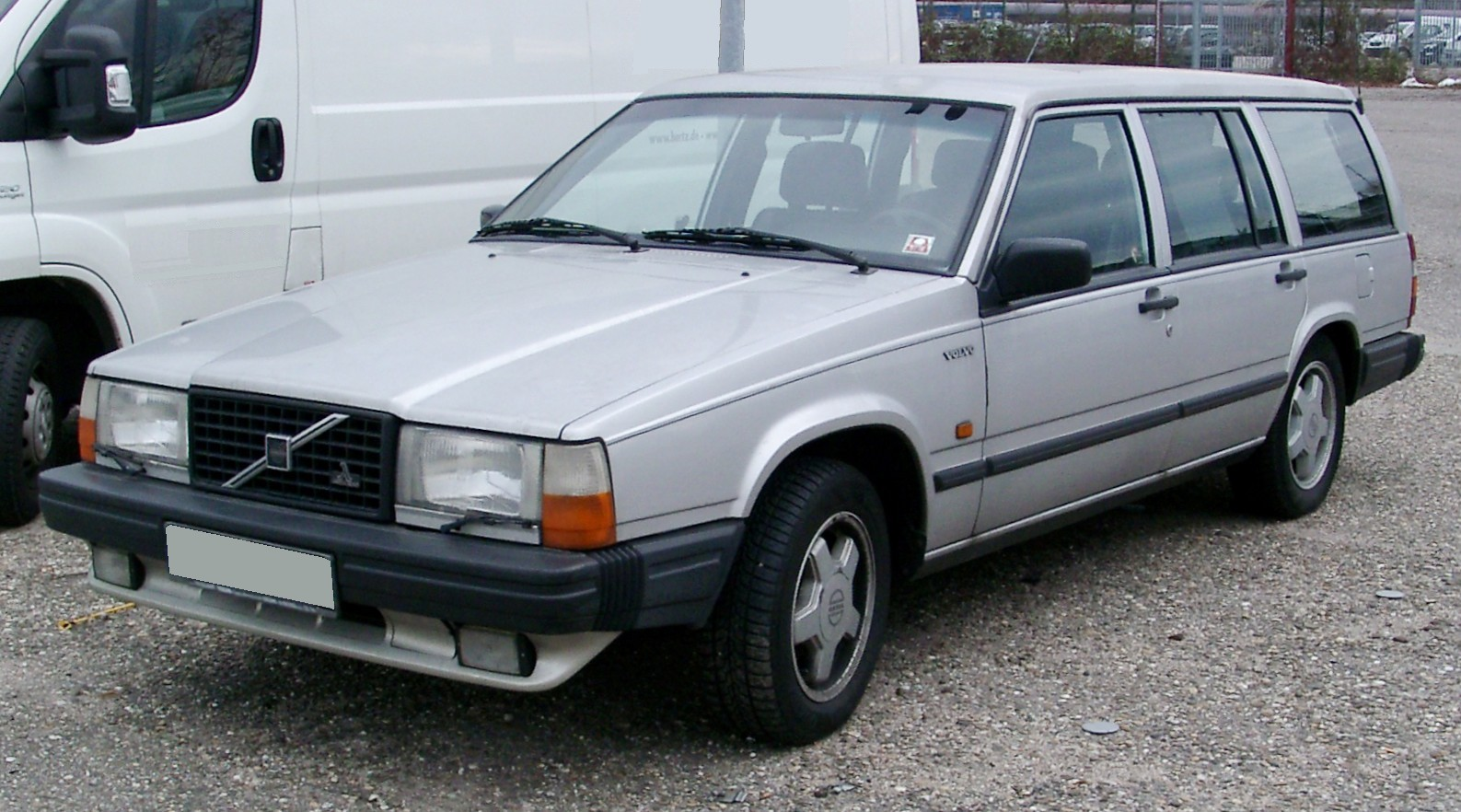
Volvo 740 Turbo estate pre-facelift (DE)

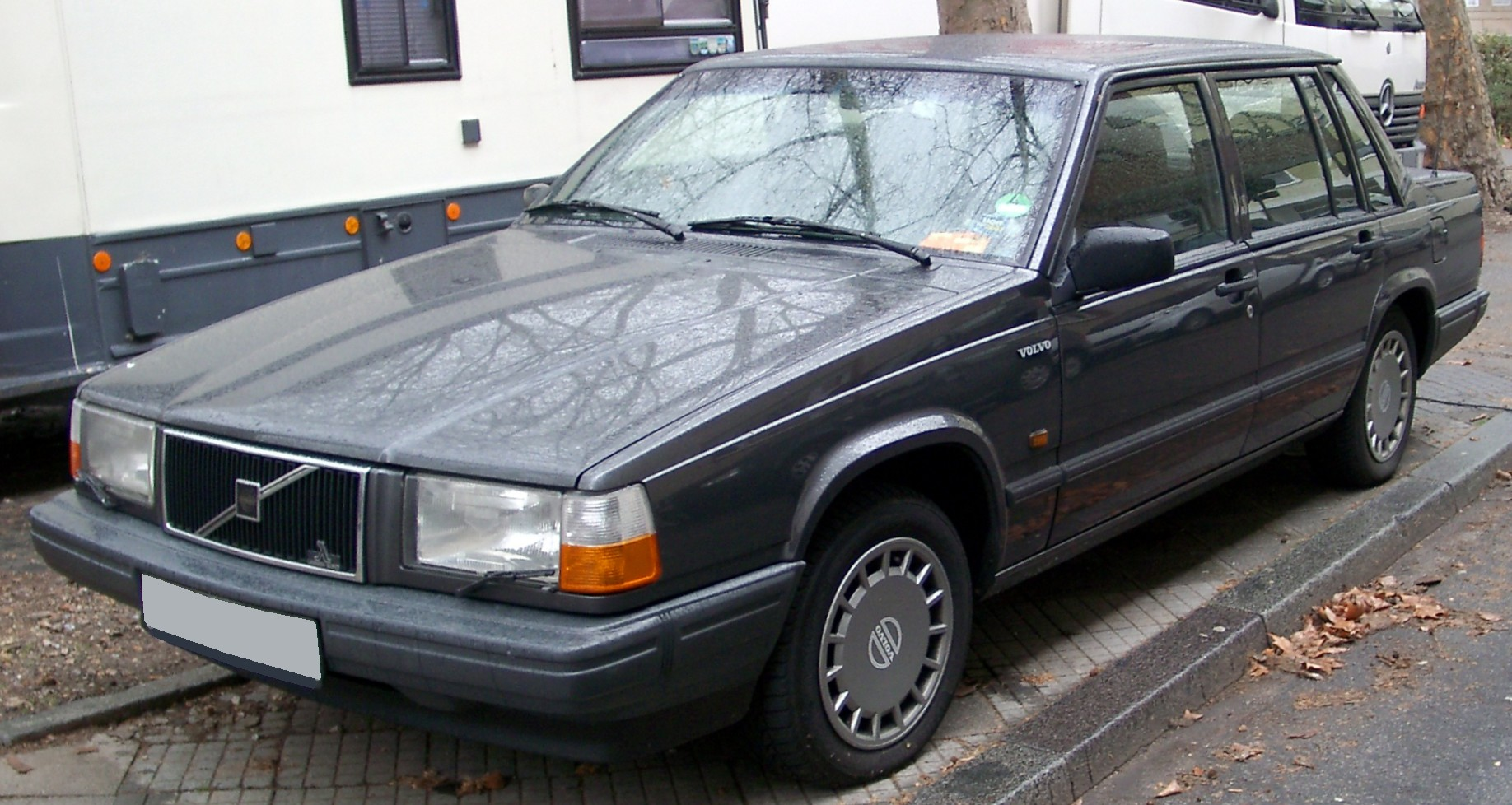
Volvo 740 saloon post facelift (DE)

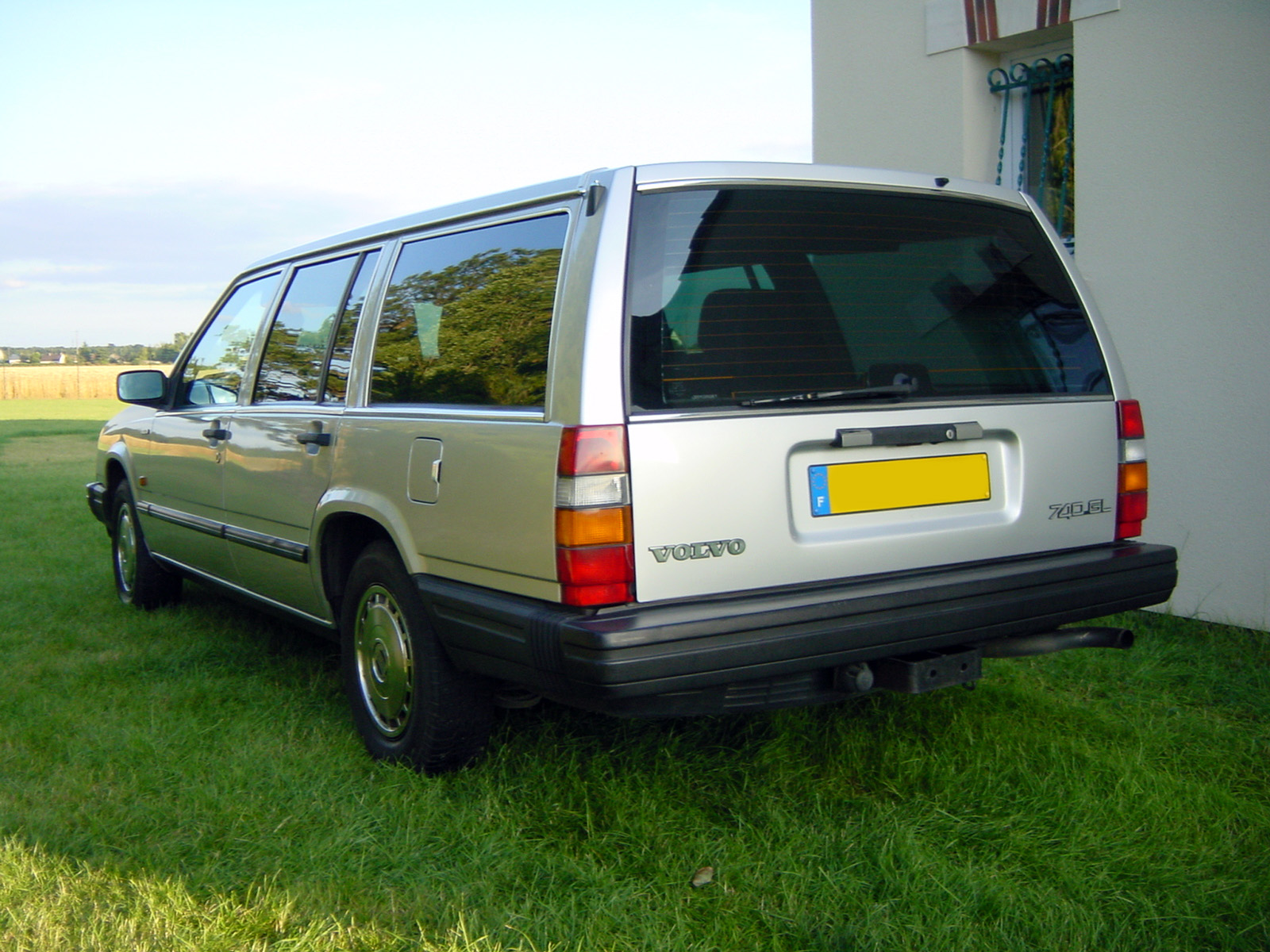
Volvo 740 GL estate (NL)

For 1985, an intercooled version of the 2-litre turbo engine (B200ET) was introduced for markets such as Italy, where larger engines were heavily taxed. This unit produces 160 PS (118 kW) at 5500 rpm, ten brake horsepower more than the preceding non-intercooled B19ET variant, enough for a claimed 200 km/h (124 mph) top speed. Model year 1986 marked the worldwide introduction of the station wagon; other differences were limited to a new font for the "740" badging and new hubcap designs. First shown at the 1988 Geneva Motor Show with tentative specifications but only going on sale with the introduction of the 1989 model year cars, a 16-valve version of the larger B230 engine was introduced (B234). This model has nearly as much peak power as the turbo version and was Volvo's first multi-valve engine.

=== Facelift ===
In 1990, the 740 received a minor facelift with new, smaller, composite headlamps and 780-style tail lights. In 1991, both the 740 and the newly introduced 940 received an updated dashboard, similar in appearance to the ones found in the 760. The 740 remained mostly unchanged for the 1992 model year, and sales ended in 1994. Production of the 740 ceased on 2 October 1992, though the engine, transmission, chassis, and other details continued in the Volvo 940 (introduced in September 1990), which was essentially identical to the 740 with the exception of the rear of the sedans.

Aside from styling, 1990 also marked a number of mechanical improvements to the 740 series. The B200 and B230 motors received larger 13 mm (0.5 in) connecting rods. The 740 Turbo switched from the Garrett T3-series turbocharger to the Mitsubishi TD04 series, which offers quicker spool-up and better boost at low engine speeds, albeit at the expense of top-end performance. The electronic fuel injection system was upgraded from Bosch LH-Jetronic 2.2 to 2.4 (in 1988 for naturally aspirated cars, in 1990 for turbocharged cars). The newer fuel system offers onboard diagnostics, which are accessible from the engine compartment and require no special equipment. For 1992, the final model year for the 740, the mechanical engine cooling fan was replaced with an electric fan.

=== Versions ===
Trim levels were 740, 740 GL, 740 GLE, 740 SE, 740 GLT and 740 Turbo, worldwide.

Continental markets had some exceptions to this rule. The 740 Turbo 16V (most markets received the 2.3 litre eight-valve turbo engine) was sold mainly in Italy, but also in Portugal and Belgium, and used the 2-litre B204FT engine found also in the 780 for these same markets. The 740 Turbo 16V was equipped with the ECC from the 780 as standard.

Late in 1991, Volvo offered a sedan and estate badged the 740 SE, standing for "special equipment". The 740 SE came in three colors; red, black, and white. Mechanically, the 740 SE was the same as a normal 740 Turbo, but with many features, such as a power sunroof and leather seats, as standard equipment. The SE also had a special factory color-keyed body kit, including front and rear bumpers, side skirts, and a spoiler for the sedan. The 740 SE, along with the 740 Turbo sedan, was discontinued for 1992.

== Volvo 760 ==
Volvo 760
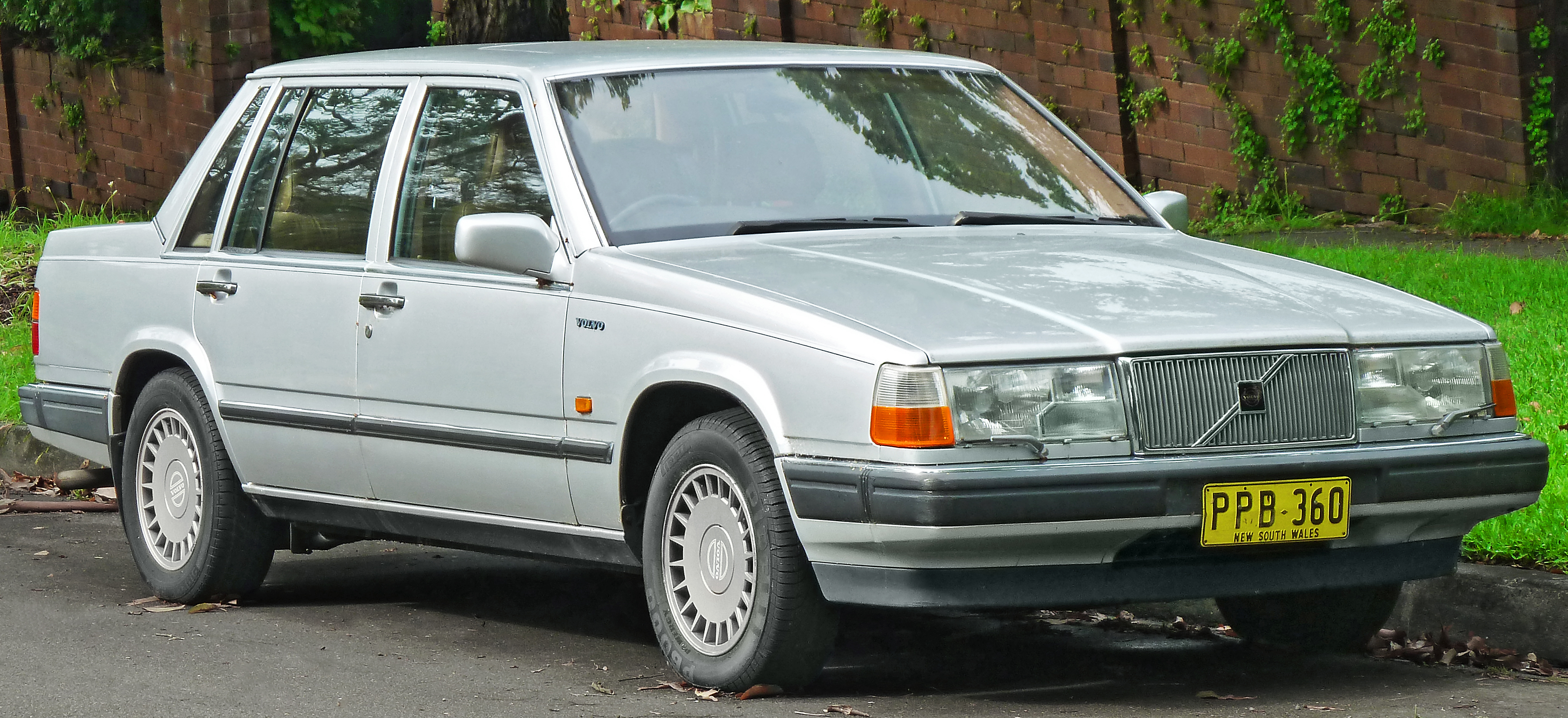
- Volvo 760 GLE (facelift model)

Overview
- Production: 1982–1990
- Assembly: Sweden: Kalmar (VKA); Australia: Clayton; Belgium: Ghent; Canada: Halifax (VHA)
- Designer: Jan Wilsgaard

Body and chassis
- Body style: 4-door saloon 5-door estate

Powertrain
- Engine: petrol: 2.3 L B23ET turbo I4; 2.3 L B230ET/FT/FT+ turbo I4; 2.8 L B28A/E/F V6; 2.8 L B280E/F V6; diesel: 2.4 L D24TIC turbo I6
- Transmission: 5-speed Volvo M47 manual 4-speed Volvo M46 manual 4-speed AW71 automatic 4-speed AW72L automatic (lockup torque converter); 4-speed ZF4HP22 automatic (lockup torque converter)

Dimensions
- Wheelbase: 2,770 mm (109.1 in)
- Length: 1982–1987: 4,800 mm (189.0 in); 1988–1990: 4,790 mm (188.6 in)
- Width: 1982–1987: 1,750 mm (68.9 in); 1988–1990: 1,760 mm (69.3 in)
- Height: 1,410 mm (55.5 in); 1,435 mm (56.5 in) (estate)
- Curb weight: 1,360–1,510 kg (3,000–3,330 lb)

The 760 marked a new strategy for Volvo, as they introduced the executive six-cylinder model first with the four-cylinder 740 only following a few years later. Jan Wilsgaard, head of Volvo's Design and Styling Team, proposed over 50 new designs for the new car. Unusual for a new executive car at the time, the 760 had a live rear axle – Volvo's designers claimed that a well-designed one was at least as capable as any independent design, while offering substantial cost and weight savings. The axle itself was mounted almost entirely behind the passenger compartment, freeing up more space inside, and was unusual in that it is mounted in a sub-frame, allowing better passenger comfort than a conventional setup. Volvo called the system Constant Track Rear Suspension, drawing attention to another benefit of a live axle.

It was introduced to the U.S. in 1982 for the 1983 model year as the 760 GLE saloon, with the V6 engine coupled to an automatic transmission, having been launched in Sweden in February 1982 and in Britain from July 1982. The federalized Turbo Diesel went on sale a few months later, at the very end of 1982. In February 1985 the 760 Station Wagon ("765" in internal parlance) was introduced, going on sale in US and Canada a few months later. European markets only received the wagons beginning in the autumn, for the 1986 model year.

This new design was criticized by the media when released: Gordon Murray of Autocar Magazine said, "to me it's obscene. That goes right against the grain of what everybody else is trying to do. To me it looks like a European version of a North American car. It produces the same amount of power as a 2600 or 3500 — in this day and age it disgusts me to see something about like that. It's a definite step backwards."

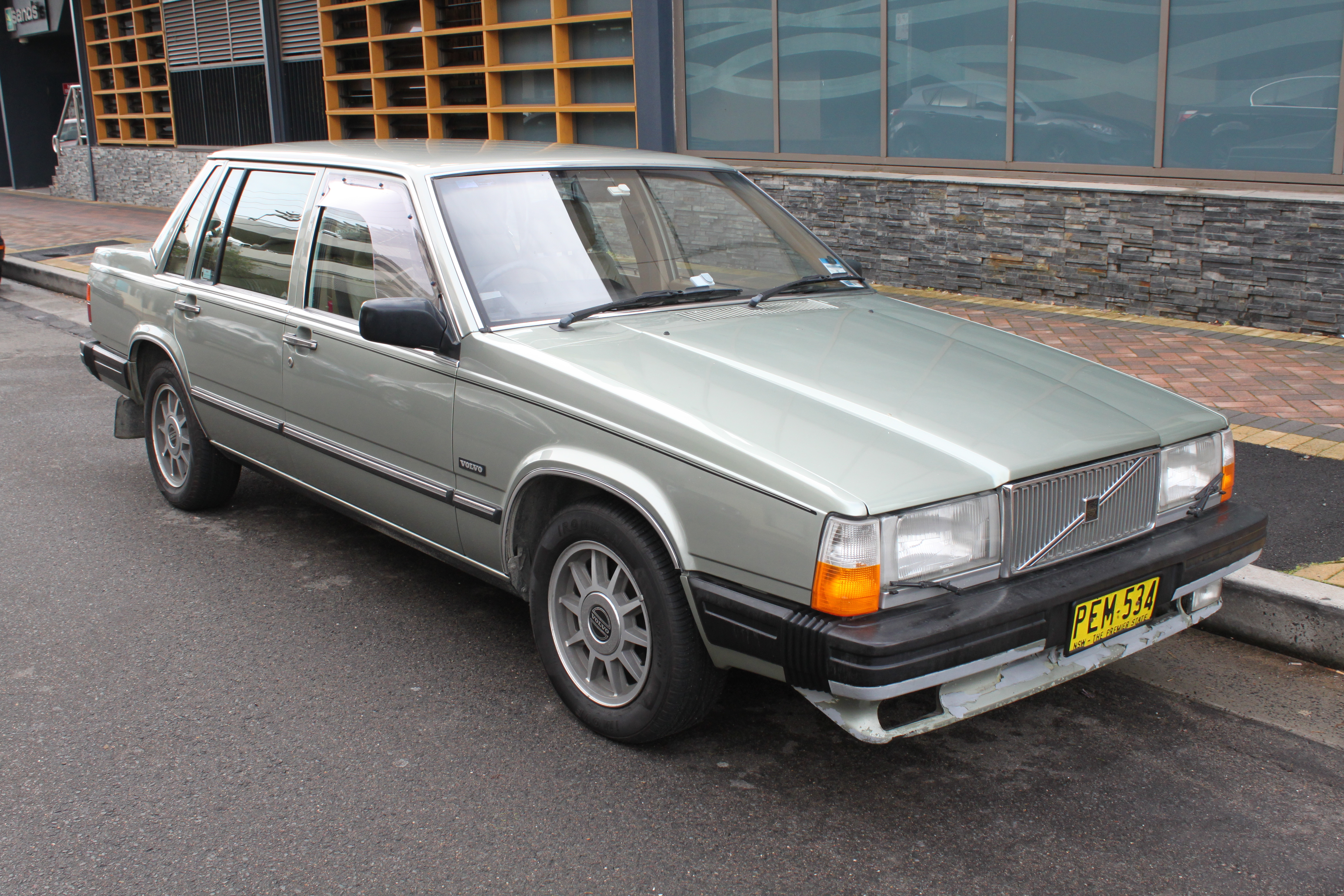
Volvo 760 GLE saloon pre-facelift (AU)

The Turbodiesel, while presented alongside the V6 model, was not immediately available in all markets, with Volvo focusing on markets where diesels had a high market penetration. In Sweden, for instance, it only went on sale for the 1983 model year. Contrarily, in Italy the 740 and 760 diesels sold more than the Mercedes-Benz W123 diesels and the BMW 524d combined in the first half of 1984. The Turbo Diesel was somewhat handicapped in the United States market by only offering a five-speed manual transmission. With the bottom dropping out of the diesel market this was not a major issue, however. The heavy diesel engine made for a pronounced front weight bias, with 57 percent of the car's weight resting on the front wheels.

1983 also brought air conditioning and power windows as standard equipment in Sweden, while a bigger 82-litre (22 US gal; 18 imp gal) fuel tank was gradually introduced. Turbocharged and intercooled variants were added in 1984, while the 740 (the 760's lower-specification sibling) was introduced for the 1985 model year. In 1985, an electronic traction control system was introduced. Unlike the lesser 740, the 760 received standard anti-lock brakes in many models.

For the 1988 model year, the 760 received numerous updates. From the outside, the most noticeable of the over 2000 changes were the revised front sheet metal, including an aluminium hood, recessed windscreen wipers, and new aerodynamic headlights. Inside, all 760s received a revised dashboard which was angled towards the driver, 3-position tilt steering, and a new stereo system. The top versions were now equipped with a new electronic climate control (ECC; standard on cars sold in the US). Underneath, saloons received the same multi-link independent rear suspension which was also introduced on the 780. The new 4-link rear axle also required a new fuel tank, which was in the form of a saddle, sitting atop the driveshaft. The volume of the tank shrunk by 2 liters, to 80 L (21.1 US gal; 17.6 imp gal). Along with the revised dash, the interior saw the addition of a revised dome light and many fabric accent pieces. The 760 Estate received the same changes, except it continued to use the live rear axle. This was due to the weight increase: the new rear suspension weighed about 40 kg (88 lb) more than the old one, and Volvo determined that the loss of payload would not be worth the comfort improvements.

East German leader Erich Honecker often used this Volvo in his governmental car pool.

For 1990, its final year of production, Volvo 760 saloons received taillights in the style of the Volvo 780 and minor interior changes. The 760 was discontinued after the 1990 model year (with production ending on 27 June 1990), replaced by the Volvo 960, an update of the 760 chassis. The Volvo 740 outlived the 760, remaining for another two years, finally being discontinued in 1992 after the 850 was launched.

The Volvo 760 was built in Kalmar, Sweden, and Ghent, Belgium. Cars were also assembled in Halifax, Nova Scotia, Canada, and in Clayton, Victoria in Australia.

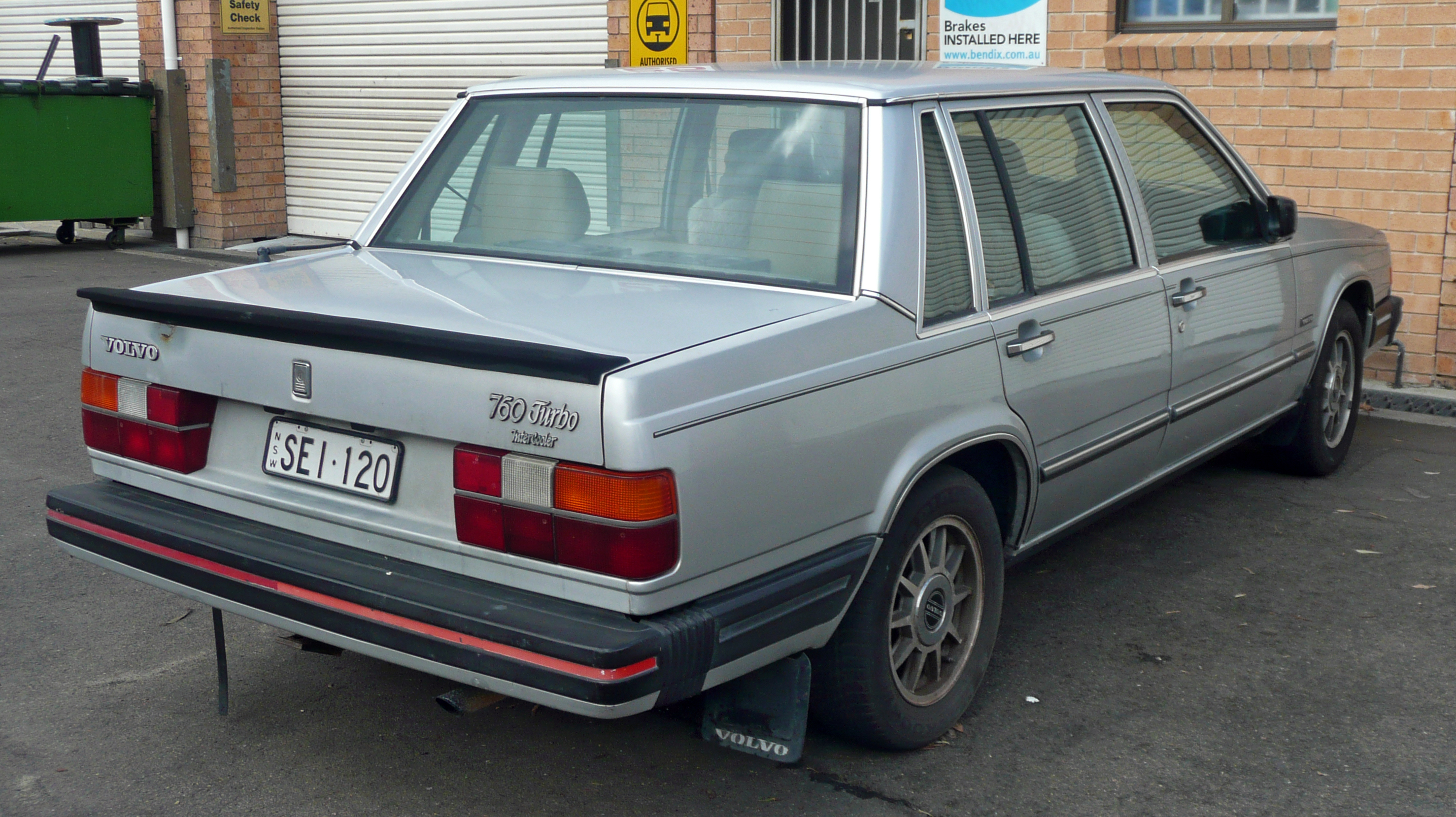
Volvo 760 Turbo saloon pre-facelift (AU)

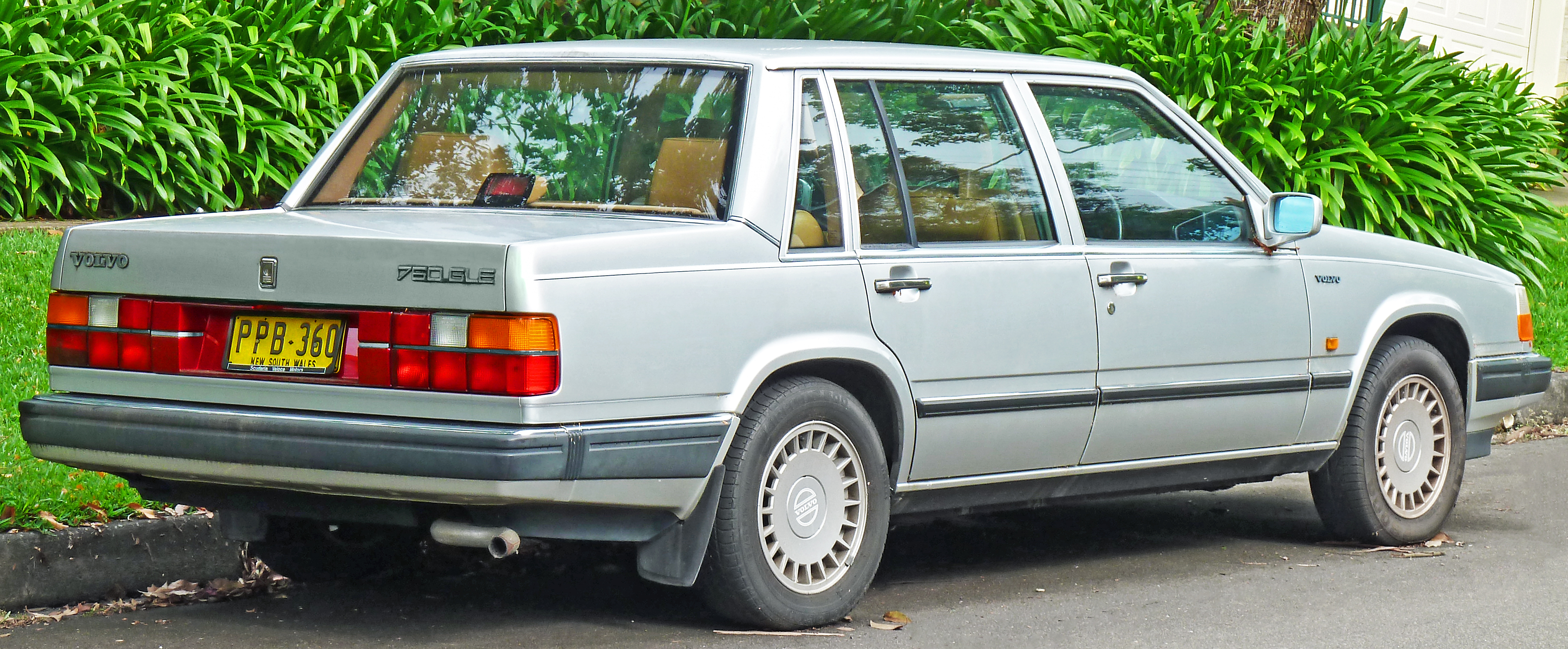
Volvo 760 GLE post facelift (AU)

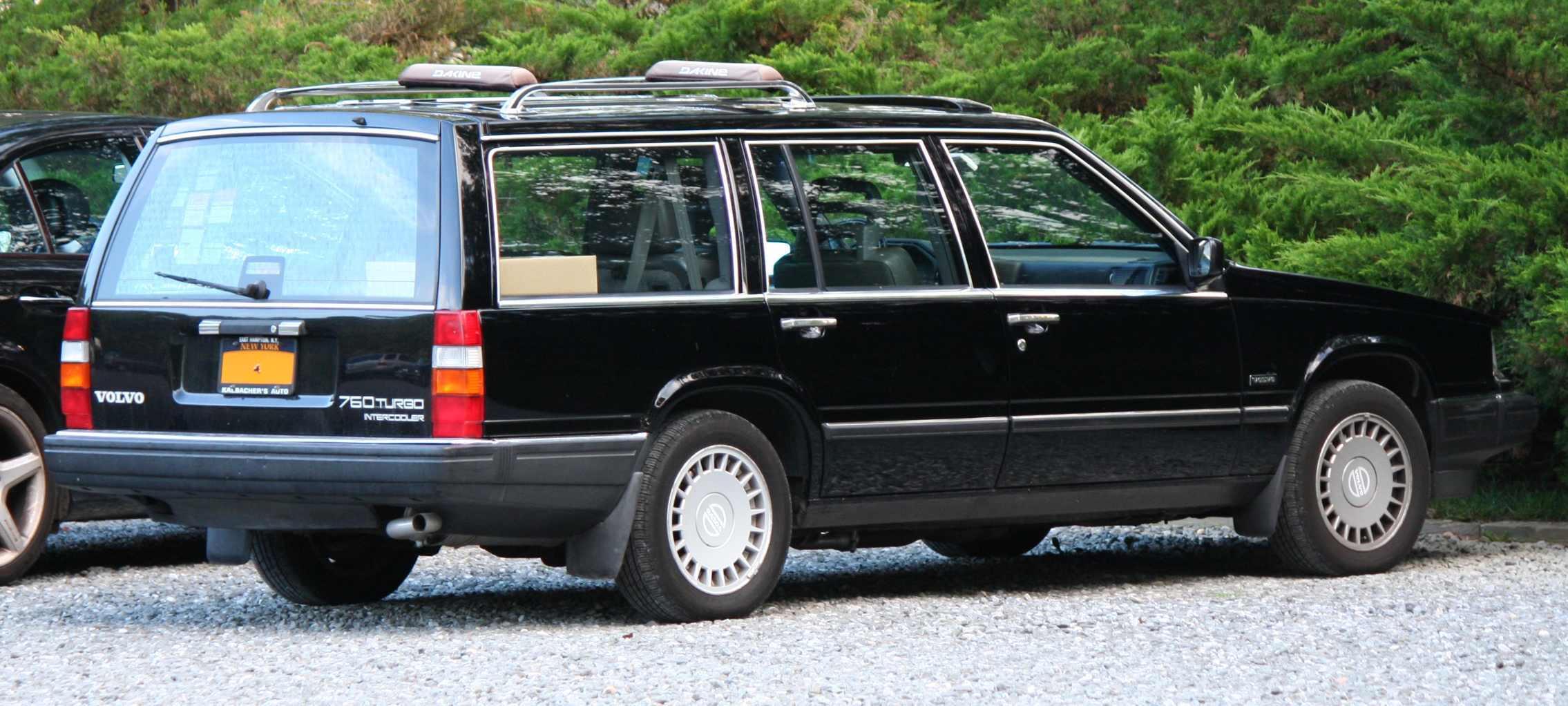
Volvo 760 Turbo Intercooler estate (US)

== Volvo 780 ==
Volvo 780
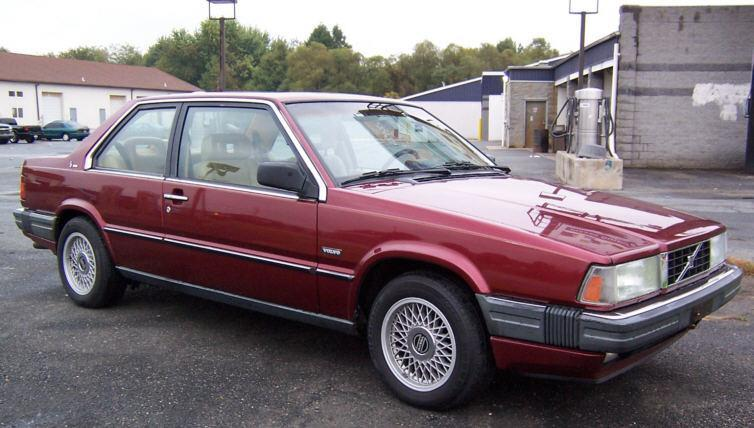

Overview
- Production: 1986–1990
- Assembly: Italy: Turin
- Designer: Bertone under Marc Deschamps, Jan Wilsgaard

Body and chassis
- Body style: 2-door coupé
- Layout: FR layout

Powertrain
- Engine: 2.0 L B200ET turbo I4; 2.0 L B204FT/GT turbo DOHC I4; 2.3 L B230FT/FT+ turbo I4; 2.8 L B280F V6; 2.4 L D24TIC I6 turbodiesel
- Transmission: 4-speed automatic; 4-speed Volvo M46 manual with electronic overdrive

Dimensions
- Wheelbase: 2,770 mm (109.1 in)
- Length: 1986–1988: 4,800 mm (189.0 in); 1989–1990: 4,785 mm (188.4 in)
- Width: 1,760 mm (69.3 in)
- Height: 1,400 mm (55.1 in)
- Curb weight: 1,549–1,583 kg (3,415–3,490 lb)

Chronology
- Predecessor: Volvo 262C
- Successor: Volvo C70

The Volvo 780 coupé debuted at the International Auto Show in Geneva, Switzerland, in 1985, marking Volvo's return to the two-door coupé market following the departure of the 262C in 1981. The 780 became available in Europe in 1986 and in the United States a year later.

The 780 was designed by Marc Deschamps and built by Carrozzeria Bertone in Turin, Italy. The hood, trunk, and roof lines were all slightly lower than the standard 700 series profile, and the C-pillar was wider and had a more gradual slope down to the trunk. Headroom was improved over the 262C since Bertone only lowered the roofline by a single centimeter this time. Window frames all had black matte trim, and were accented with chrome. Chrome also highlighted the door handles, bumpers, and side mouldings. Originally, it had been planned to use a smaller, 2,458 cc turbocharged, version of the PRV V6 (as seen in the Renault 25 and Alpine), which had already been successfully tested in 740s and 760s. In the smaller engine compartment of the 780, however, the engine overheated and the PRV V6 Turbo never appeared in a Volvo.

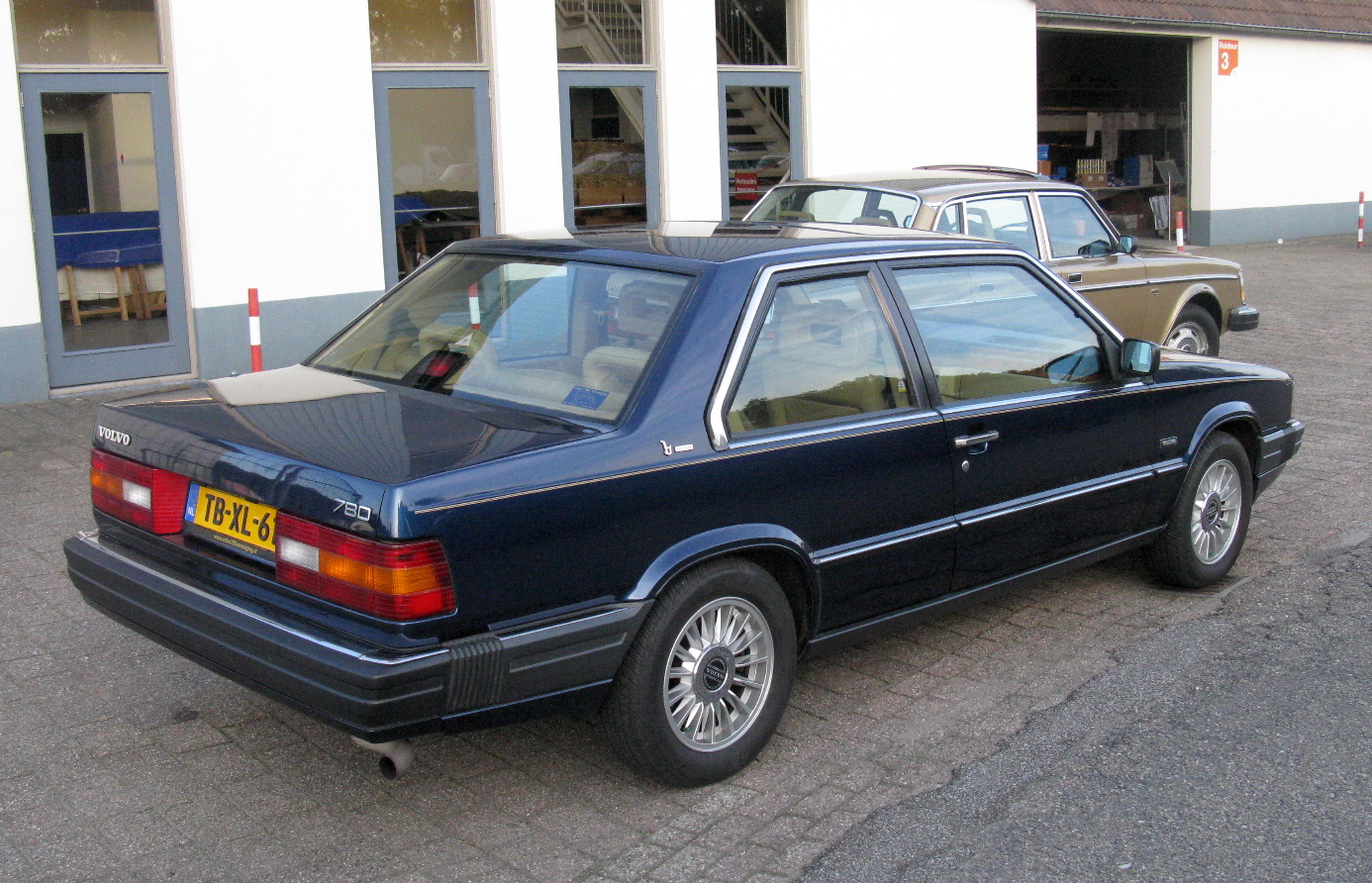
Rear view of a 1989 Volvo 780 V6

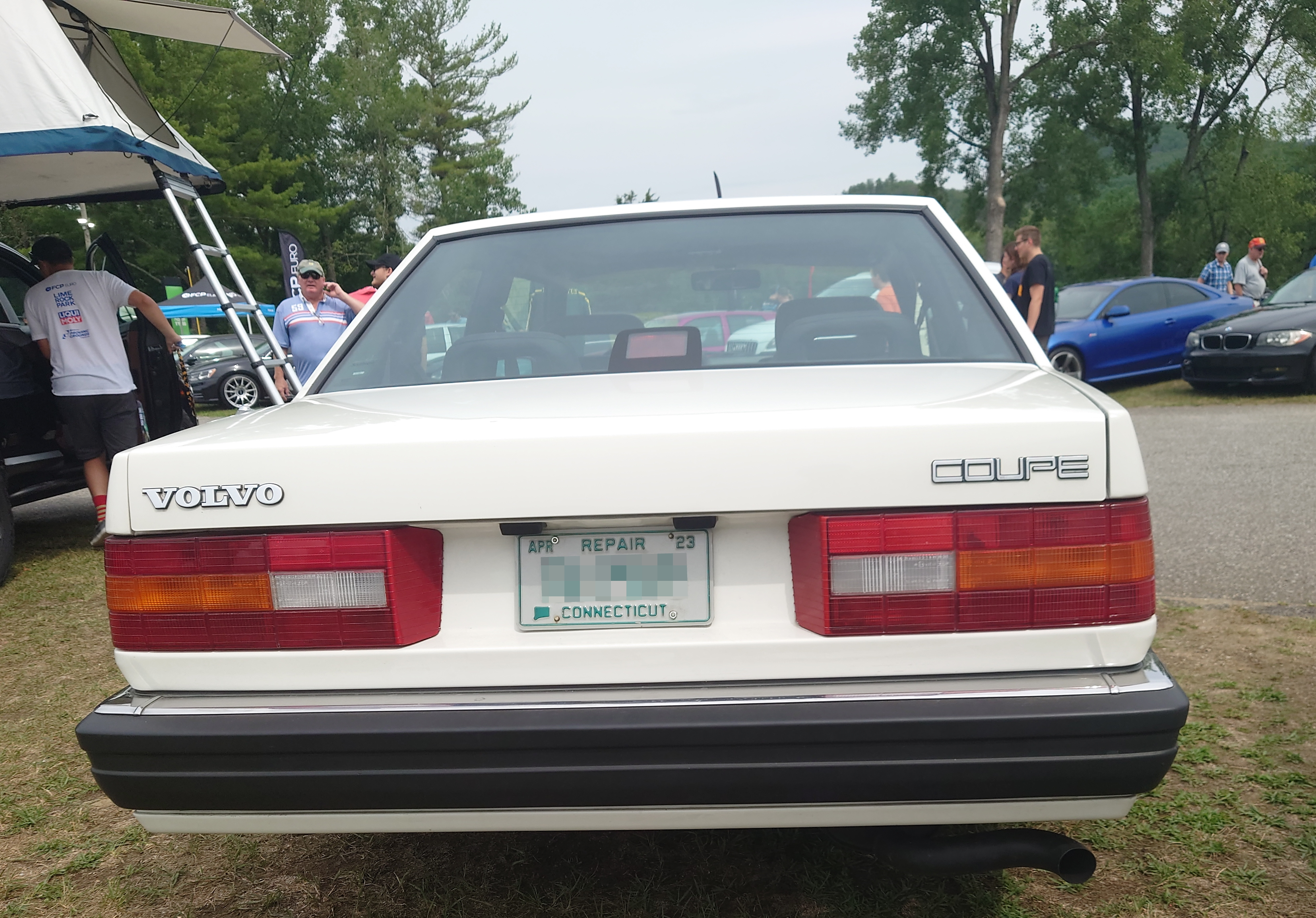
The rear of a 1991 USDM Volvo Coupe

In the first two years that the 780 was available worldwide (1986 and 1987) it received the B280F V6 engine and a solid (live) rear axle. In the Italian market, originally only the Volkswagen built D24TIC was to be offered, with 129 PS (95 kW), but soon the V6 also became available and a 155 PS (114 kW) 2.0-litre turbo (B200ET) Italian tax special was also added later in 1986. From August 1987 the 780 came equipped with Volvo's independent rear suspension, which used self-leveling Nivomat shocks to keep ride height correct. An improved climate control unit (ECC) was also fitted.

The B280F at this point produced roughly 150 PS (110 kW), but the car itself weighed nearly 3,400 lb (1,500 kg). To address concerns about performance, Volvo introduced the B230FT+; a B230FT with Volvo's Turbo+ boost controller, increasing the engine output to 175 PS (129 kW). The following model year saw this increase to 188 PS (138 kW). In Italy, later 780s were available with the B204GT. This was a 16 valve turbo motor producing 200 PS (147 kW). A mere 165 examples of the 780 were built with this engine. In the car's final year, 1991, the 780 was rebadged simply as "Volvo Coupé". At this point, the car came only in turbo guise.

Volvo's official production total for the 780 is 8,518 cars built between 1986 and 1991. From 1986 to 1995, Volvo did offer a small, sporty coupé, the front-wheel drive Volvo 480, but a successor to the 780 would only be introduced in 1997 when the C70 became available.

== Specifications ==
=== Models ===
The saloon model originally debuted in 1982 in Europe, and was joined by the estate for 1985.

Model availability:

Model /year	740	740 GL	740 GLE	740 GLE 16 valve	740 GLE Turbodiesel	740 Turbo	740 SE	760 GLE	760 GLE Turbodiesel	760 Turbo	780 GLE	780 Turbo
1982								EU/AU/US	EU/US			
1983								EU/AU/US	EU/US			
1984			EU					EU/AU/US	EU/US	EU/AU/US		
1985		EU	EU/AU/US					EU/AU/US	EU/US	EU/AU/US		
1986		EU/AU	EU/AU/US		EU/US	EU/AU/US		EU/AU/US		EU/US	EU	EU (Italy)
1987		EU/AU	EU/AU/US		EU	EU/AU/US		EU/AU/US		EU/US	EU/US	EU
1988		EU/AU	EU/AU/US		EU	EU/AU/US		EU/AU/US		EU/US	EU/US	EU/US
1989		EU/AU/US		EU/AU/US		EU/AU/US		EU/AU/US		EU/US	EU/US	EU/US
1990	EU/AU/US	EU/AU/US		EU/AU/US		EU/AU/US		EU/AU/US		EU/US	EU/US	EU/US
1991	EU/AU/US	EU/AU				US	US				EU/US	EU/US
1992	EU/AU/US	EU				US (estate)	EU (estate)					

=== Engines ===
These engines were offered on 700 series vehicles:

- B19E: 2.0 L inline-4, 117 PS (86 kW) (83.04–84.07, saloon only)
- B19ET: 2.0 L turbo inline-4, 150 PS (110 kW) (83.12–84.07, saloon only)
- B23E: 2.3 L inline-4, naturally aspirated, Bosch K-Jetronic fuel injection ('84)
- B23ET: 2.3 L turbo inline-4, utilizing Bosch Motronic engine management ('84)
- B23FT: 2.3 L turbocharged inline-4
- B28A: 2.8 L V6, naturally aspirated, carbureted ('82–85)
- B28E: 2.8 L V6, naturally aspirated, Bosch K-Jetronic, high output ('82–86)
- B28F: 2.8 L V6, naturally aspirated, odd fire crankshaft ('82–86)
- B200E: 2.0 L inline-4, naturally aspirated, Bosch K-Jetronic 115 PS (85 kW)
- B200F: 2.0 L inline-4, naturally aspirated, Bosch LH-Jetronic 111 PS (82 kW)
- B200K: 2.0 L inline-4, naturally aspirated, Renix ignition, 200K had standard head unlike 230K (introduced for the '85 model year)
- B200ET: 2.0 L inline-4, turbocharged, Bosch Motronic engine management; 155 or 160 PS (114 or 118 kW) (introduced for the '85 model year)
- B200FT: 2.0 L inline-4, turbocharged, Bosch LH-Jetronic 156 PS (115 kW)
- B204E: 2.0 L 16-valve, DOHC, inline-4, naturally aspirated (introduced for the '89 model year)
- B204FT: 2.0 L 16-valve, DOHC, inline-4, turbocharged (introduced for the '89 model year)
- B204GT: 2.0 L 16-valve, DOHC, inline-4, turbocharged (introduced for the '89 model year)
- B230A: 2.3 L inline-4, naturally aspirated, carbureted (1985–86)
- B230E: 2.3 L inline-4, naturally aspirated, Bosch K-Jetronic fuel injection (introduced in the '85 model year)
- B230F: 2.3 L inline-4, naturally aspirated, fuel injected and catalyzed 114 hp ('85–88 740GLE, '89–90 740GL, '90–92 740)
- B230K: 2.3 L inline-4, naturally aspirated, carburetted, Renix ignition, Heron head (introduced for the '85 model year)
- B230ET: 2.3 L inline-4, turbocharged, Bosch Motronic (introduced in the '85 model year)
- B230FT: 2.3 L inline-4, turbocharged, 160 PS ('85–92 740 Turbo **note: '90–92 models produced 162 PS**)
- B234F: 2.3 L 16-valve, DOHC, inline-4, naturally aspirated, 153 hp ('89–90 740 GLE/GLT)
- B280E: 2.8 L V6, naturally aspirated, Bosch LH-Jetronic 2.2, 154 PS (113 kW) Nordic or 168 PS (124 kW) European version even fire crankshaft (introduced in the '87 model year)
- B280F: 2.8 L V6, naturally aspirated, Bosch LH-Jetronic 147 PS (108 kW), even fire crankshaft ('87–90)
- D24: 2.4 L inline-6 diesel, 82 PS (60 kW), naturally aspirated (Volkswagen)
- D24T: 2.4 L inline-6, turbodiesel, 109 PS (80 kW), variant of the LT35 engine manufactured by Volkswagen.
- D24TIC: 2.4 L inline-6, turbodiesel, intercooled, 122 PS (90 kW) (780: 129 PS (95 kW)), variant of the LT35 engine manufactured by Volkswagen.

=== Transmissions ===
Volvo offered various transmissions depending on the year, model, and engine combinations including the:

- M46 manual transmission (4-speed + Laycock de Normanville overdrive)
- M47 manual transmission (5-speed)
- AW30-40 electronically controlled automatic transmission (4-speed, lockup torque converter)
- AW70/AW70L automatic transmission (4-speed, lockup torque converter on some models)
- AW71 automatic transmission (4-speed with non-lockup torque converter)
- AW71L automatic transmission (4-speed + lockup torque converter)
- AW72L automatic transmission (4-speed, lockup torque converter)
- ZF 4HP22 transmission automatic transmission (4-speed, lockup torque converter)
