= Volkswagen D24T engine =

Overview
- Manufacturer: Volkswagen Group
- Production: 1982–1992

Layout
- Configuration: Inline 6-cylinder (R6/I6) diesel engine
- Displacement: 2,383 cc (145.4 cu in)
- Cylinder bore: 76.5 mm (3.01 in)
- Piston stroke: 86.4 mm (3.40 in)
- Cylinder block material: Grey cast iron, 7 main bearings
- Cylinder head material: Cast aluminium alloy
- Valvetrain: 12v, belt-driven single overhead camshaft (SOHC)
- Compression ratio: 23.0:1

Combustion
- Turbocharger: Garrett T3 A/R 36/42 exhaust /intake
- Fuel system: Bosch mechanical distributor injection pump, indirect fuel injection
- Fuel type: Diesel
- Oil system: Wet sump 6 L (1.3 imp gal; 1.6 US gal) capacity
- Cooling system: Water-cooled

Output
- Power output: 109 hp non intercooled
- Torque output: 205 NM

Chronology
- Predecessor: Volkswagen D24 engine
- Successor: Volkswagen D24TIC engine

The Volkswagen D24T engine is a 2.4-litre inline-six-cylinder (R6/I6) single overhead camshaft (SOHC) diesel engine, formerly manufactured by Volkswagen Group from December 1982 to July 1992.

== Technical description ==
The engine is constructed in an identical manner to the earlier Volkswagen D24 engine, but includes a turbocharger for improved performance. The engine head is modified compared to a naturally aspirated engine. The valve zone is not flat anymore but slightly hemispheric. The engine block is equipped with oil squirters (with pressure valve) for better cooling of the pistons. The pistons are modified on the skirt zone to not interfere with the oil squirters during the strokes. The injection pump (bosch VE) is adapted to the turbo system.

D24T models
ID	DIN-rated max. power at rpm	max. torque at rpm	redline (rpm)	years
	63 kW (86 PS; 84 bhp) at 4600	152 N⋅m (112 lbf⋅ft) at 2500	5150	1985
1G	68 kW (92 PS; 91 bhp) at 3400			1988–1989
DV	82 kW (111 PS; 110 bhp) at 4800	225 N⋅m (166 lbf⋅ft) at 2500		1982–1992
GR	82 kW (111 PS; 110 bhp) at 4800	225 N⋅m (166 lbf⋅ft) at 2500	5400	

== Applications ==
- Volkswagen LT (DV: 12/82-07/92, 1G: 08/88-07/89)
- Volvo 740
- Volvo 760 and 780
- Volvo 940
- Volvo 960
- Steyr-Puch Pinzgauer 716 and 718

== See also ==
- List of Volkswagen Group diesel engines
- List of discontinued Volkswagen Group diesel engines
- Turbocharged Direct Injection
