= Volkswagen D24TIC engine =

Overview
- Manufacturer: Volkswagen Group
- Production: 1982–1998

Layout
- Configuration: Inline-six (R6/I6) diesel engine
- Displacement: 2,383 cc (145.4 cu in)
- Cylinder bore: 75.5 mm (2.97 in)
- Piston stroke: 86.4 mm (3.40 in)
- Cylinder block material: Grey cast iron, 7 main bearings
- Cylinder head material: Cast aluminium alloy
- Valvetrain: 12v, belt-driven single overhead camshaft (SOHC)
- Compression ratio: 23.0:1

Combustion
- Turbocharger: Garrett T03
- Fuel system: Bosch mechanical distributor injection pump, indirect fuel injection
- Fuel type: Diesel
- Oil system: Wet sump
- Cooling system: Water-cooled

Output
- Power output: 91 kW (122 hp)
- Torque output: 235 N⋅m (173 lbf⋅ft)

Chronology
- Predecessor: Volkswagen D24T engine

The Volkswagen D24TIC is a 2.4-litre inline-six (R6/I6) single overhead camshaft (SOHC) diesel engine, manufactured by Volkswagen Group from August 1986 to December 1998.

== Technical description and rated outputs ==
The engine is constructed in an identical manner to the Volkswagen D24T engine, and its earlier Volkswagen D24 engine - but includes an intercooler to aid its turbocharger in order to improve overall performance and consistency of performance.

The ”TDIC” variant features an oil cooler and additional power (95 kW (127 bhp)).

D24TIC models
ID	DIN-rated max. power at rpm	max. torque at rpm	redline (rpm)	years
DW	70 kW (95 PS; 94 bhp) at 4,000	220 N⋅m (162 lbf⋅ft) at 2,000		1986-1991
ACL	70 kW (95 PS; 94 bhp) at 4,000	220 N⋅m (162 lbf⋅ft) at 2,000		1991-1995
Volvo D24T	80 kW (109 PS; 107 bhp) at 4,800	205 N⋅m (151 lbf⋅ft) at 2,500	5,350	1982-1989
Volvo D24TDIC	95 kW (129 PS; 127 bhp) at 4,650	250 N⋅m (184 lbf⋅ft) at 2,400	5,350	1986-1991
Volvo D24TIC	85 kW (116 PS; 114 bhp) at 4,800	235 N⋅m (173 lbf⋅ft) at 2,400		1986-1991
Volvo D24TIC	90 kW (122 PS; 121 bhp) at 4,800	235 N⋅m (173 lbf⋅ft) at 2,400		1991-1996

== Applications ==
- 1983–1990 — Volvo 740
- 1982–1990 — Volvo 760
- 1991–1995 — Volkswagen LT (ACL)
- 1990–1996 — Volvo 940
- 1990–1996 — Volvo 965

== See also ==
- List of discontinued Volkswagen Group diesel engines
- Turbocharged Direct Injection
