= Volkswagen Crafter =

Cargo van

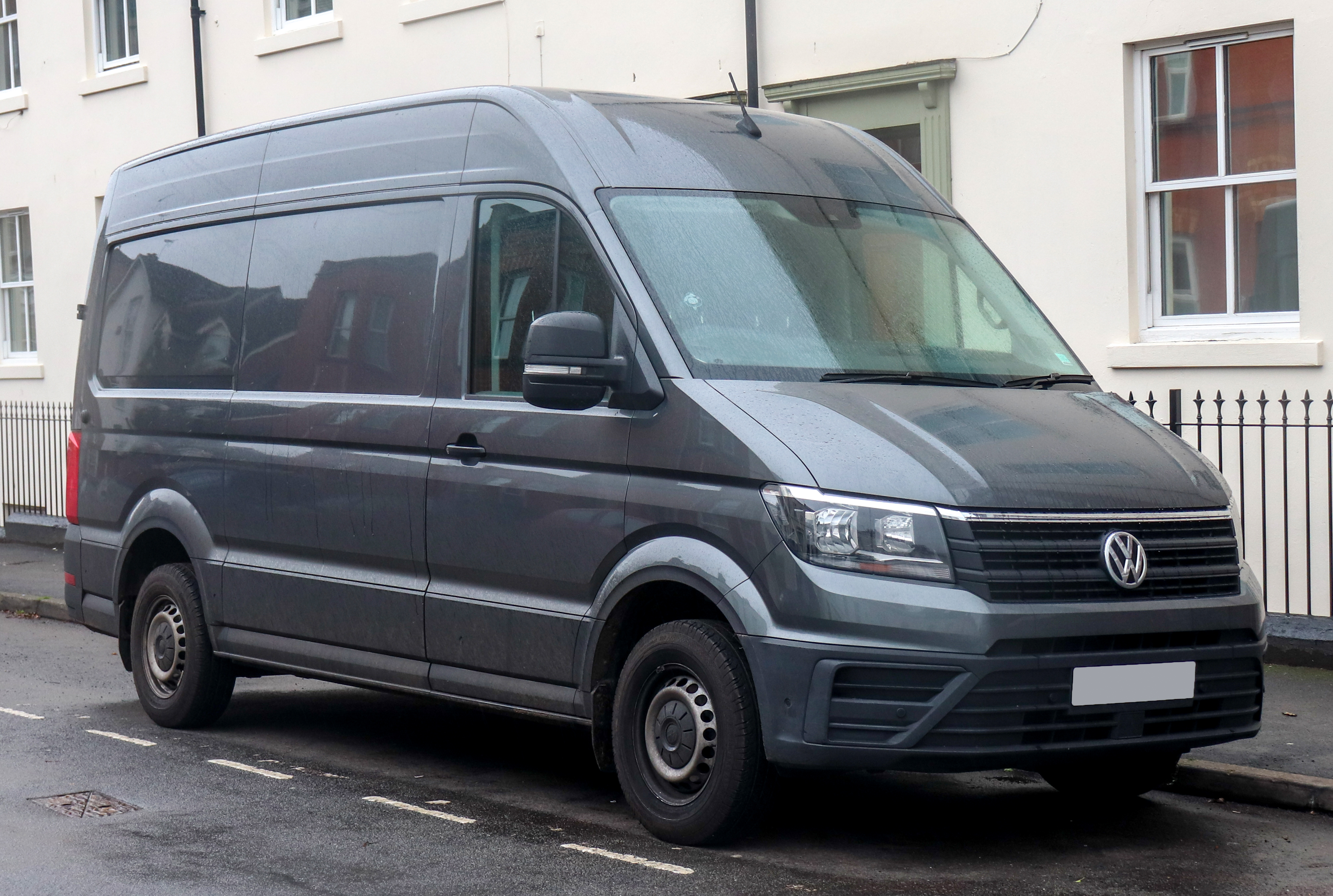

Overview
- Manufacturer: Volkswagen Commercial Vehicles
- Also called: Mercedes-Benz Sprinter (Second Gen); MAN TGE; Volkswagen Grand California; Torsus Terrastorm
- Production: 2006–present
- Assembly: From 2016: Poland, Września (Volkswagen Poznań Sp. z o.o., Września Plant); Previously: Germany, Düsseldorf (Daimler AG Werk Düsseldorf); Germany: Ludwigsfelde (Mercedes-Benz Ludwigsfelde)
- Designer: Laurent Boulay

Body and chassis
- Class: Light commercial vehicle (M)
- Body style: Panel van; Minibus; Double cab; Cab chassis
- Layout: FF layout FR layout
- Platform: MNB (Modular Light Commercial Vehicle platform) Second generation

Powertrain
- Engine: 2.0 L I4 TDI with DPF; 2.5 L I5 TDI with DPF
- Electric motor: 100 kW (136.0 PS; 134.1 hp) synchronous permanent magnet AC motor
- Transmission: 6-speed manual; 6-speed Shiftmatic automatic; 8-speed Aisin automatic (FWD models)

Dimensions
- Wheelbase: SWB: 3,250 mm (128.0 in); MWB: 3,665 mm (144.3 in); LWB: 4,325 mm (170.3 in)
- Length: 5,245 mm (206.5 in) – 6,930 mm (272.8 in): Chassis Double Cab LWB: 6,680 mm (263.0 in); 6,840 mm (269.3 in); 6,845 mm (269.5 in); Chassis Double Cab MWB: 5,870 mm (231.1 in); 6,085 mm (239.6 in); 6,140 mm (241.7 in); Chassis Double Cab SWB: 5,305 mm (208.9 in); 5,560 mm (218.9 in); Chassis Single Cab LWB: 6,680 mm (263.0 in); 6,845 mm (269.5 in); 6,930 mm (272.8 in); Chassis Single Cab MWB: 5,870 mm (231.1 in); 6,020 mm (237.0 in); 6,085 mm (239.6 in); Chassis Single Cab SWB: 5,305 mm (208.9 in); 5,570 mm (219.3 in); LWB: 7,345 mm (289.2 in); 6,940 mm (273.2 in); MWB: 5,910 mm (232.7 in); SWB: 5,245 mm (206.5 in)
- Width: Vans: 1,993 mm (78.5 in); Pickup Trucks: 2,426 mm (95.5 in); 2,682 mm (105.6 in)
- Height: 2,365 mm (93.1 in) – 3,050 mm (120.1 in) Chassis Double Cab LWB: 2,420 mm (95.3 in); 2,405 mm (94.7 in); Chassis Double Cab MWB: 2,440 mm (96.1 in); 2,425 mm (95.5 in); Chassis Double Cab SWB: 2,365 mm (93.1 in) (also Chassis Single Cab SWB); 2,380 mm (93.7 in); Chassis Single Cab LWB: 2,385 mm (93.9 in); 2,395 mm (94.3 in); Chassis Single Cab MWB: 2,410 mm (94.9 in); 2,400 mm (94.5 in); LWB: 3,055 mm (120.3 in) (with roof); 3,050 mm (120.1 in) (with roof); 2,715 mm (106.9 in); 2,825 mm (111.2 in); 2,820 mm (111.0 in); MWB: 2,720 mm (107.1 in) (with roof); 3,050 mm (120.1 in) (with roof); 2,820 mm (111.0 in) (with roof); 2,435 mm (95.9 in); 2,535 mm (99.8 in); SWB: 2,435 mm (95.9 in); 2,725 mm (107.3 in) (with roof)

Chronology
- Predecessor: Volkswagen LT

The Volkswagen Crafter, introduced in 2006, is the largest three- to five-ton van produced and sold by the German automaker Volkswagen Commercial Vehicles. The Crafter officially replaced the Volkswagen Transporter LT that was launched in 1975, although it is known as the LT3, its production plant code.

Like the second-generation LT, the first-generation Crafter is a rebadged Mercedes-Benz Sprinter, built by Daimler AG, with a powertrain by Volkswagen. An all-electric variant, the e-Crafter, was released in 2017.

Starting with the second Generation (2017 model year), the Crafter has been designed and built by Volkswagen and is no longer associated with the Sprinter. A version of the Crafter is also sold by MAN Truck & Bus as the MAN TGE.

== First generation (Typ 2E/2F, 2006–2017) ==
=== Production plants ===
The first-generation Crafter was built in the Mercedes-Benz Ludwigsfelde and Düsseldorf plants, the same German factories where the Mercedes-Benz Sprinter is built.

=== Design ===
French car designer Laurent Boulay is responsible for the frontal design of the Crafter, which takes cues from the Volkswagen Constellation.

=== Engines ===
From launch in 2006 up to 2010, all internal combustion engines were based upon Volkswagen Group's re engineered 2.5 litre R5 TDI. This turbodiesel is an inline five-cylinder (R5) Turbocharged Direct Injection (TDI) diesel engine.

It displaces 2,459 cubic centimetres (150.1 cu in), and uses what was the latest common rail fuel system, with piezoelectric actuated injectors for the cylinder-direct fuel injection. It also utilises a diesel particulate filter (DPF), allowing all engine variants to comply with Euro IV European emission standards.

The 2010 version of the 2.5 TDI CR engine was redesigned, correcting the previous problems of turbo failure. An engine update was also released under the guise of "Blue TDI", which used AdBlue – or diesel exhaust fluid (DEF) – in combination with a DPF to attain the more stringent Euro V EEV European emission standards.

Engines (2006–2011)
Model	Engine type	Power	rpm	Torque	rpm	European emission standards
2.5 TDI CR	2,459 cc (150 cu in) I5 turbo	88 PS (65 kW; 87 hp)	3500	220 N⋅m (162 lb⋅ft)	2000	Euro 4
2.5 TDI CR	2,459 cc (150 cu in) I5 turbo	88 PS (65 kW; 87 hp)	3300	250 N⋅m (184 lb⋅ft)	1900–2300	Euro 5 EEV
2.5 TDI CR	2,459 cc (150 cu in) I5 turbo	109 PS (80 kW; 108 hp)	3500	280 N⋅m (207 lb⋅ft)	2000	Euro 4
2.5 TDI CR	2,459 cc (150 cu in) I5 turbo	109 PS (80 kW; 108 hp)	3300	300 N⋅m (221 lb⋅ft)	1900–2300	Euro 5 EEV
2.5 TDI CR	2,459 cc (150 cu in) I5 turbo	136 PS (100 kW; 134 hp)	3500	300 N⋅m (221 lb⋅ft)	2000	Euro 4
2.5 TDI CR	2,459 cc (150 cu in) I5 turbo	136 PS (100 kW; 134 hp)	3500	330 N⋅m (243 lb⋅ft)	2000	Euro 5 EEV
2.5 TDI CR	2,459 cc (150 cu in) I5 turbo	163 PS (120 kW; 161 hp)	3500	350 N⋅m (258 lb⋅ft)	2000	Euro 4
2.5 TDI CR	2,459 cc (150 cu in) I5 turbo	163 PS (120 kW; 161 hp)	3500	360 N⋅m (266 lb⋅ft)	2200	Euro 5 EEV

=== Features ===
The Crafter is available in three wheelbase options; 3,250 millimetres (128.0 in), 3,665 millimetres (144.3 in) and 4,325 millimetres (170.3 in). It is equipped with front airbags as standard, and side and curtain airbags as options, along with anti-lock braking system (ABS), load adapting electronic stability programme (ESP), anti-slip regulation (traction control) (ASR), and electronic differential lock (EDL).

The electronic differential lock (EDL) employed by Volkswagen is not, as the name suggests, a differential lock at all. Sensors monitor both roadwheel speeds across a driven axle, and if one is rotating substantially faster than the other (i.e. slipping) the EDL system momentarily brakes it. This effectively transfers the torque to the other driven wheel which is deemed to still have grip.

=== Payloads and gross vehicle weights ===
The Crafter Chassis and Double Cabs models have payloads ranging from 1,472 to 3,026 kilograms (3,245 to 6,671 lb), and come in gross vehicle weights (GVW) of either 3.5 or 5.3 tonnes.

=== Conversions based on the Volkswagen Crafter ===
The Crafter is an ideal base vehicle for minibus conversions, and Volkswagen have a list of accredited vehicle conversion specialists.

=== Awards ===
The Crafter has won a number of motor industry awards, including:

- 2006 What Van? – Overall Van of the Year (UK)
- 2006 What Van? – Large Van of the Year (UK)
- 2007 Professional Van and Light Truck Magazine – Large Van of the Year (UK)
- 2007 Van Fleet World – Best Large Panel Van (UK)
- 2007 Delivery Magazine – Large Van of the Year (Australia)
- 2008 Professional Van and Light Truck Magazine – Best Van derived Chassis Cab of the Year (UK)
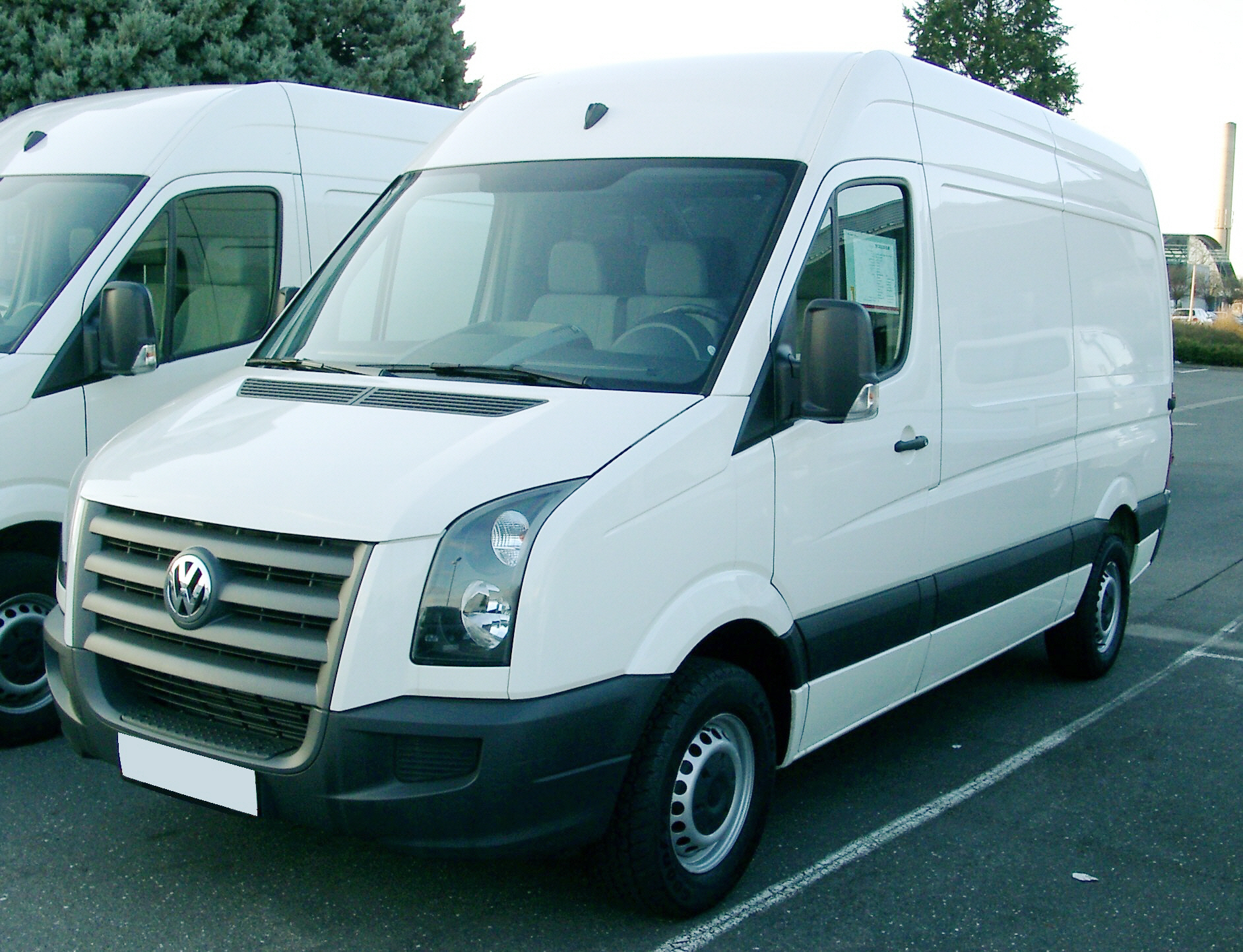
Front (Europe; pre facelift)

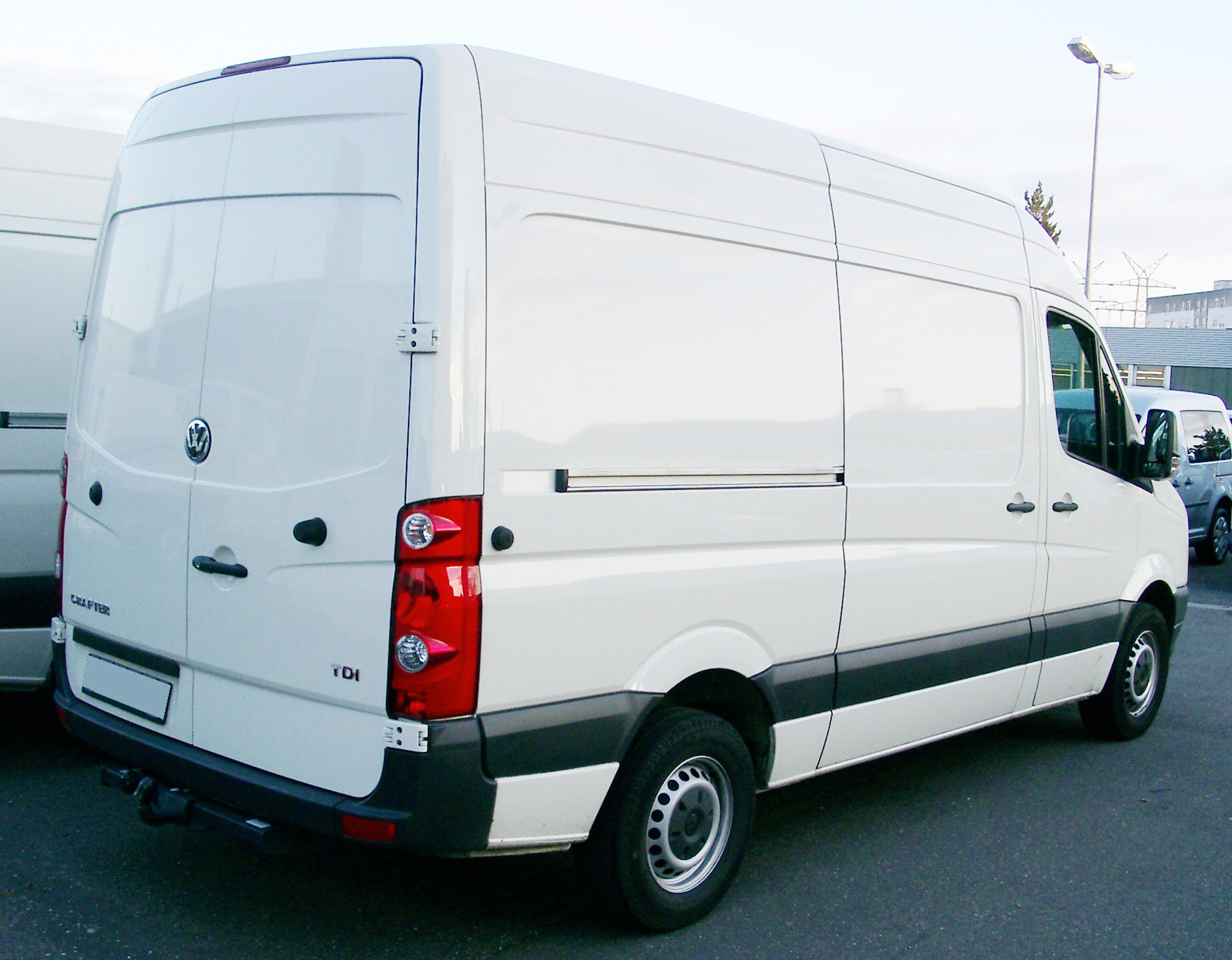
Rear (Europe; pre facelift)

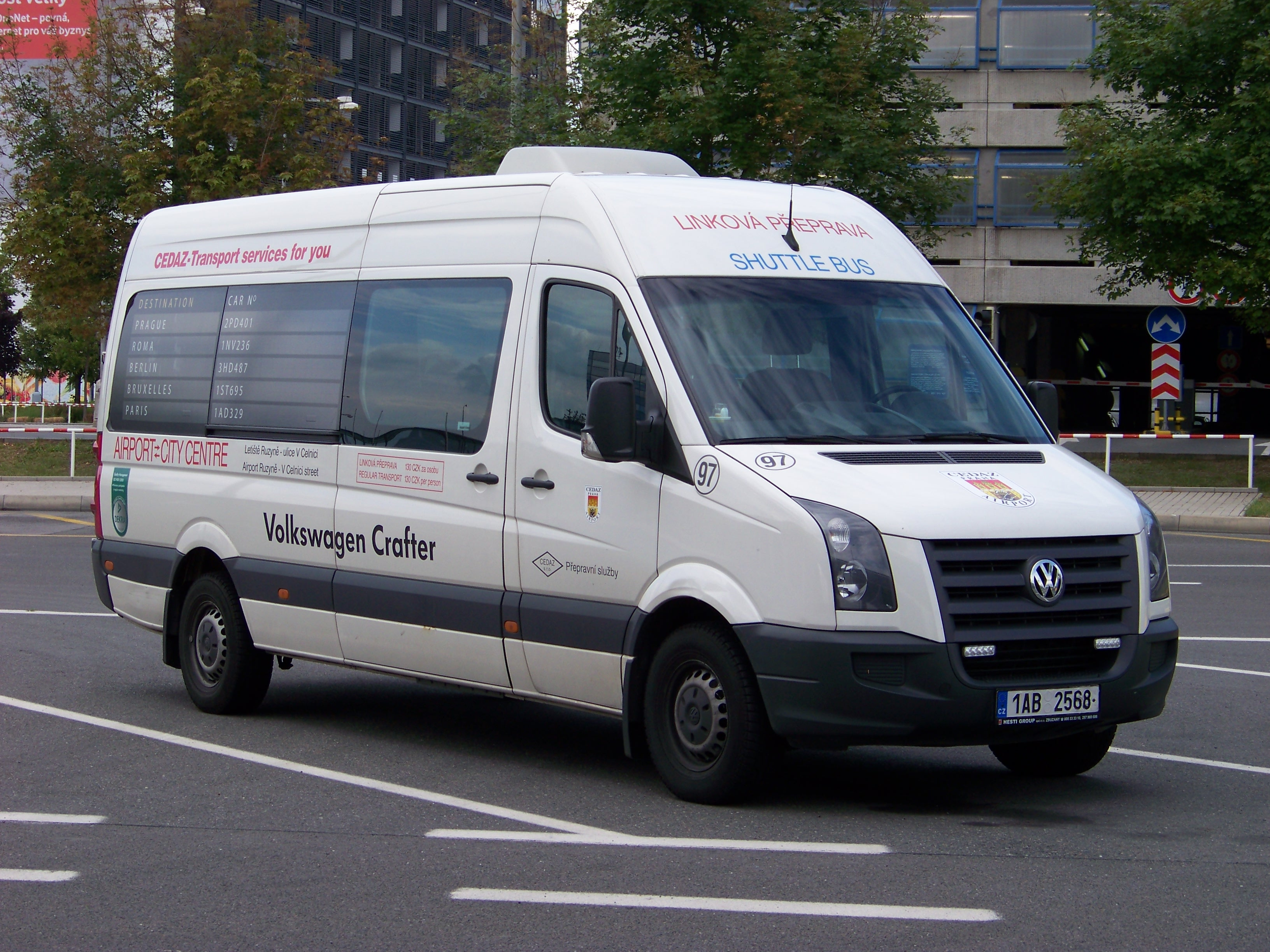
Volkswagen Crafter Minibus (Europe; pre facelift)

=== First generation facelift (2011–2017) ===
Volkswagen Commercial Vehicles released a revised Crafter in April 2011. The design of the grille was changed to the current design language of the Volkswagen brand. New power trains based on the 2.0L TDI producing 80 kW/109 PS, 100 kW/136 PS and BiTDI 120 kW/163 PS with the engine revised the payload was increased by up to 10% on some models. The facelift appeared 2 years before the Sprinter on which its based got its own facelift.

=== Engines ===
In 2011, the 2.5 litre engine was replaced by the 2.0 litre TDI, which utilises exhaust gas recirculation (EGR) in conjunction with a diesel particulate filter (DPF), allowing all engine variants to comply with Euro 5b (Euro V) European emission standards, which came into force in September 2011.

Engines (2011–2017)
Model	Engine type	Power	rpm	Torque	rpm	European emission standards
2.0 TDI CR	1,968 cc (120 cu in) I4 turbo	109 PS (80 kW; 108 hp)	3500	300 N⋅m (221 lb⋅ft)	1500–2250	Euro 5b
2.0 TDI CR	1,968 cc (120 cu in) I4 turbo	136 PS (100 kW; 134 hp)	3500	340 N⋅m (251 lb⋅ft)	1500–2250	Euro 5b
2.0 BiTDI CR	1,968 cc (120 cu in) I4 turbo	163 PS (120 kW; 161 hp)	4000	400 N⋅m (295 lb⋅ft)	1500–2250	Euro 5b

In March 2012 the Crafter 4Motion variant was released as an option with one engine, the BiTDI with 120 kW (163 PS; 161 hp). The four wheel drive system is supplied and fitted by Austrian specialists Achleitner.

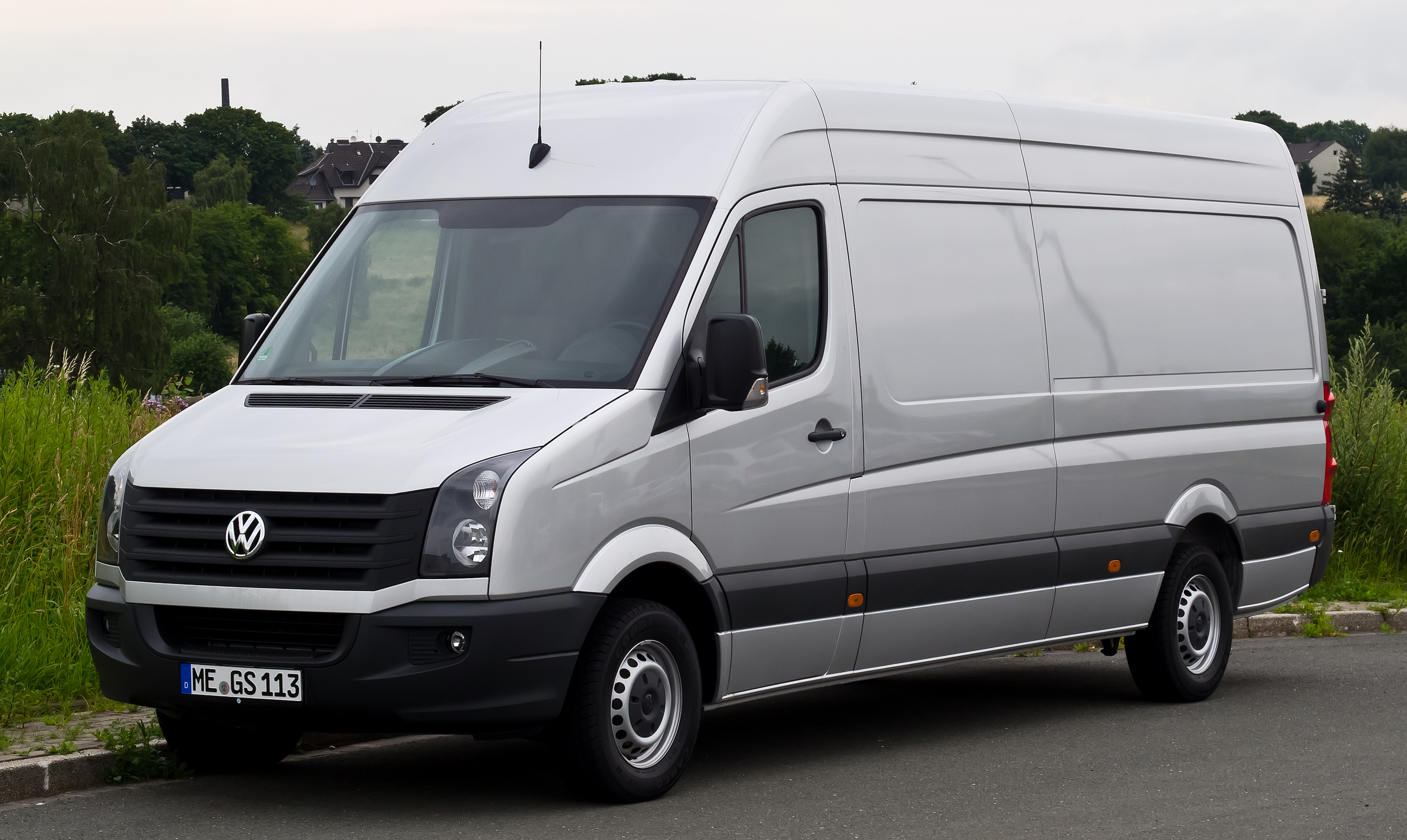
Facelift front (2011)

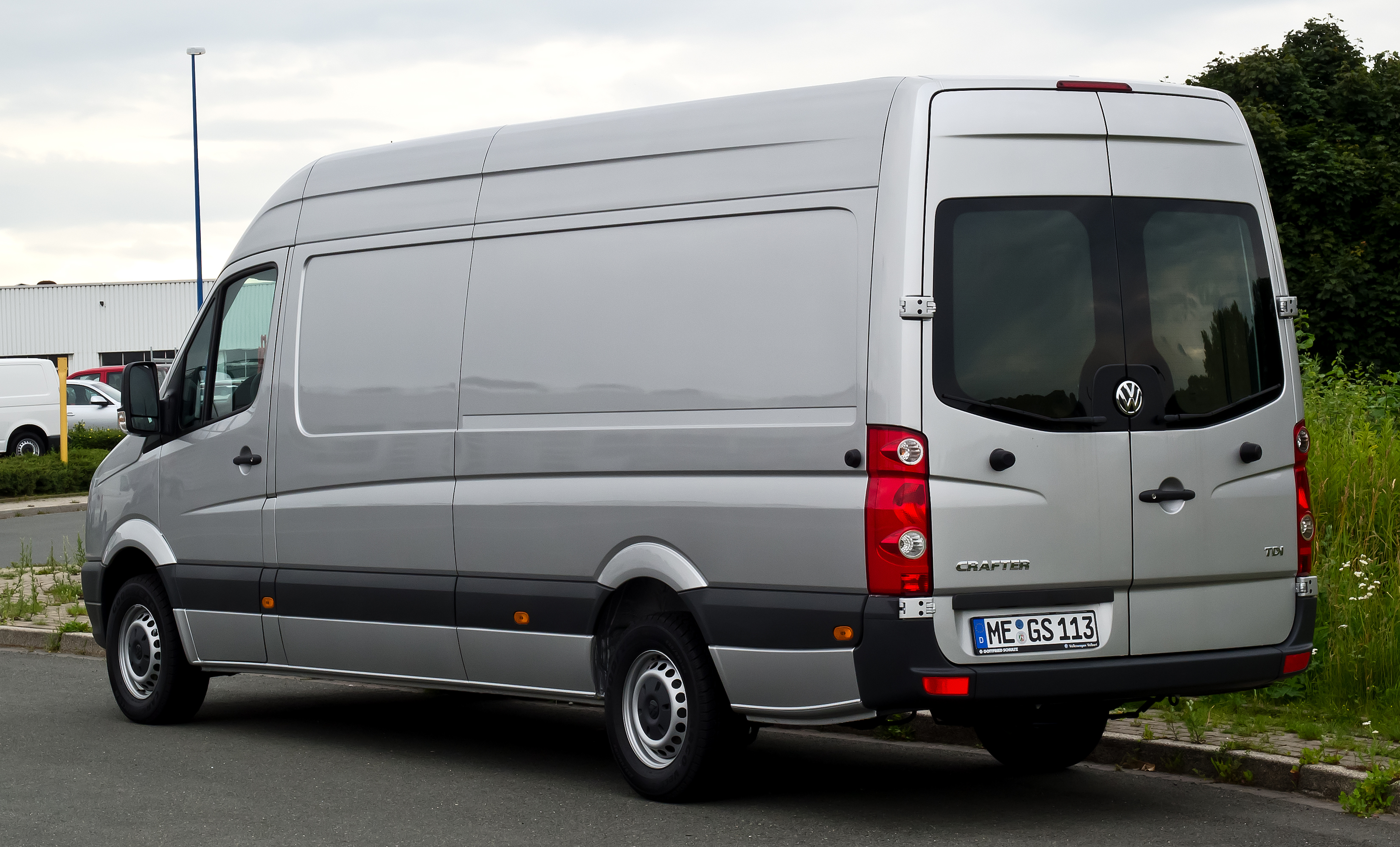
Facelift rear (2011)

== Second generation (Typ SY/SZ, 2017–present) ==
The second generation of the Volkswagen Crafter was developed entirely by Volkswagen, after the end of their collaboration with Mercedes-Benz. The new design corresponds with the current design line of Volkswagen, and comes in Startline or Trendline trim. The motorhome variant, called the Volkswagen Grand California, was first shown at the 2018 Caravan Salon Düsseldorf. The Grand California comes in two lengths; the 6.0 metre (600) and the 6.8 metre (680) and went on sale at the beginning of 2019.

The second generation Crafter is built in Września, Poland, with a new factory being built specifically for its production. Planned volume is 85,000 vehicles per year, on a 220 ha sized site (300,000 square metres under roof). The cost of the new plant was about 800 million EUR.

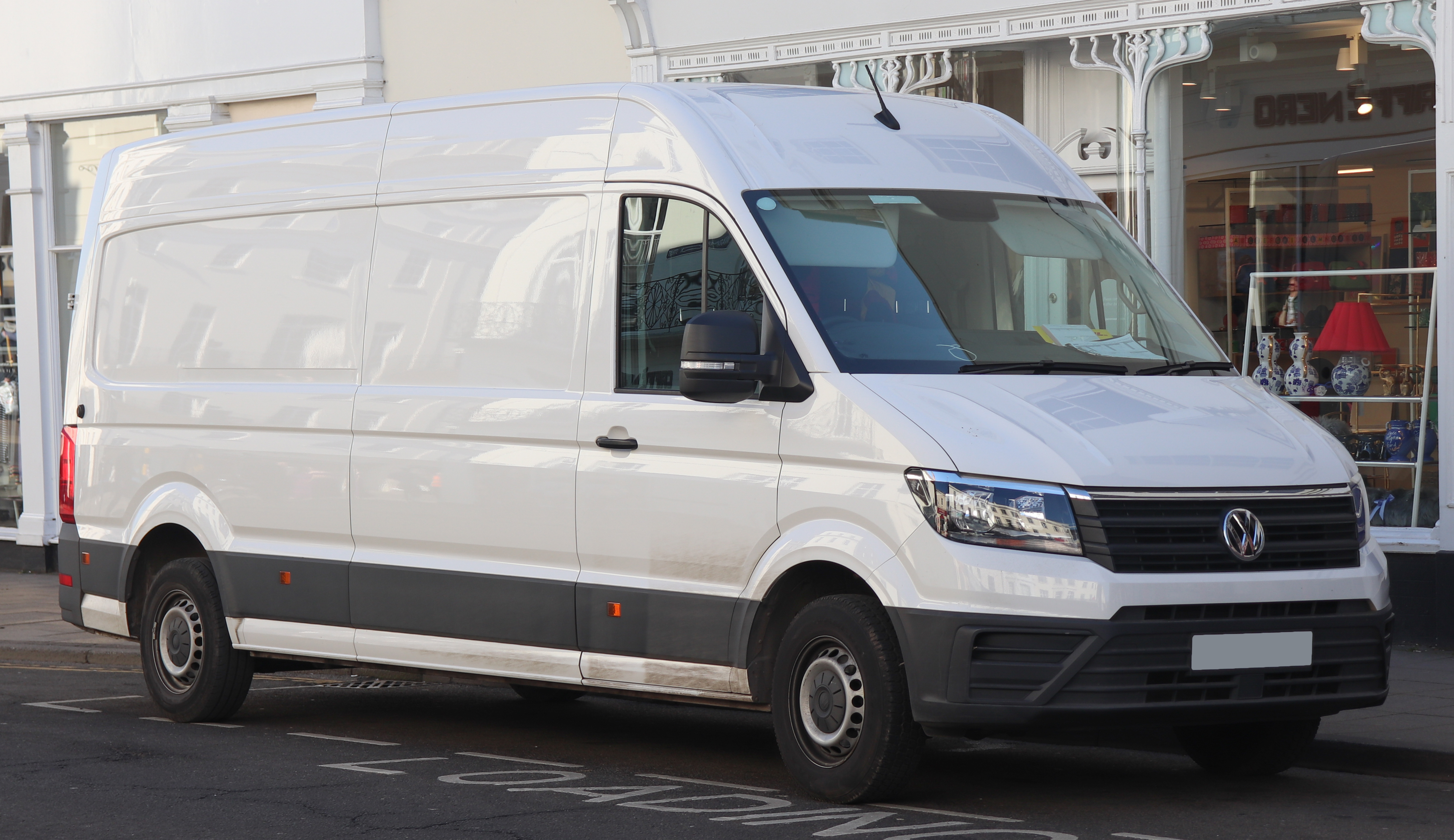
Second generation Crafter front

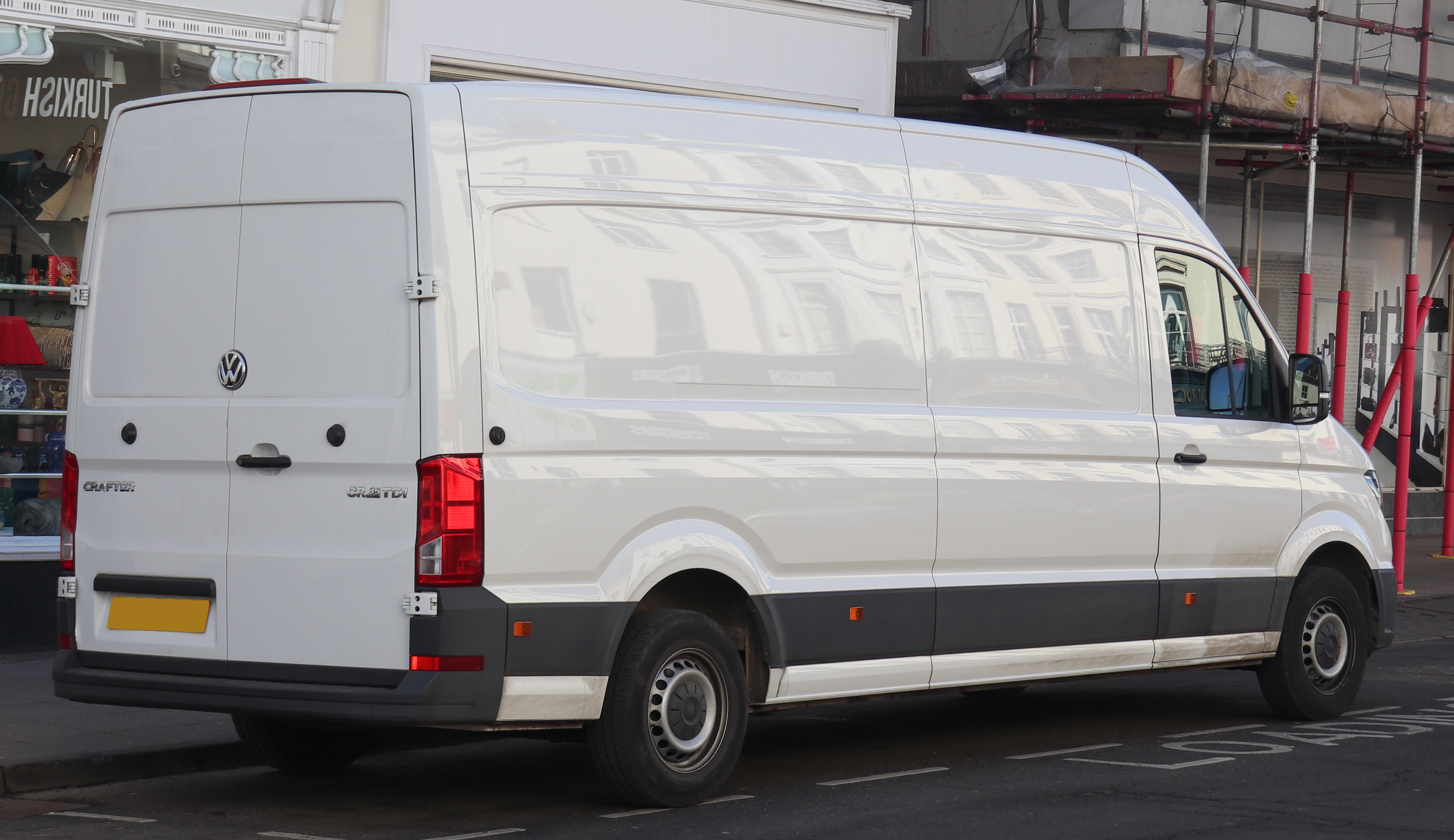
Second generation Crafter rear

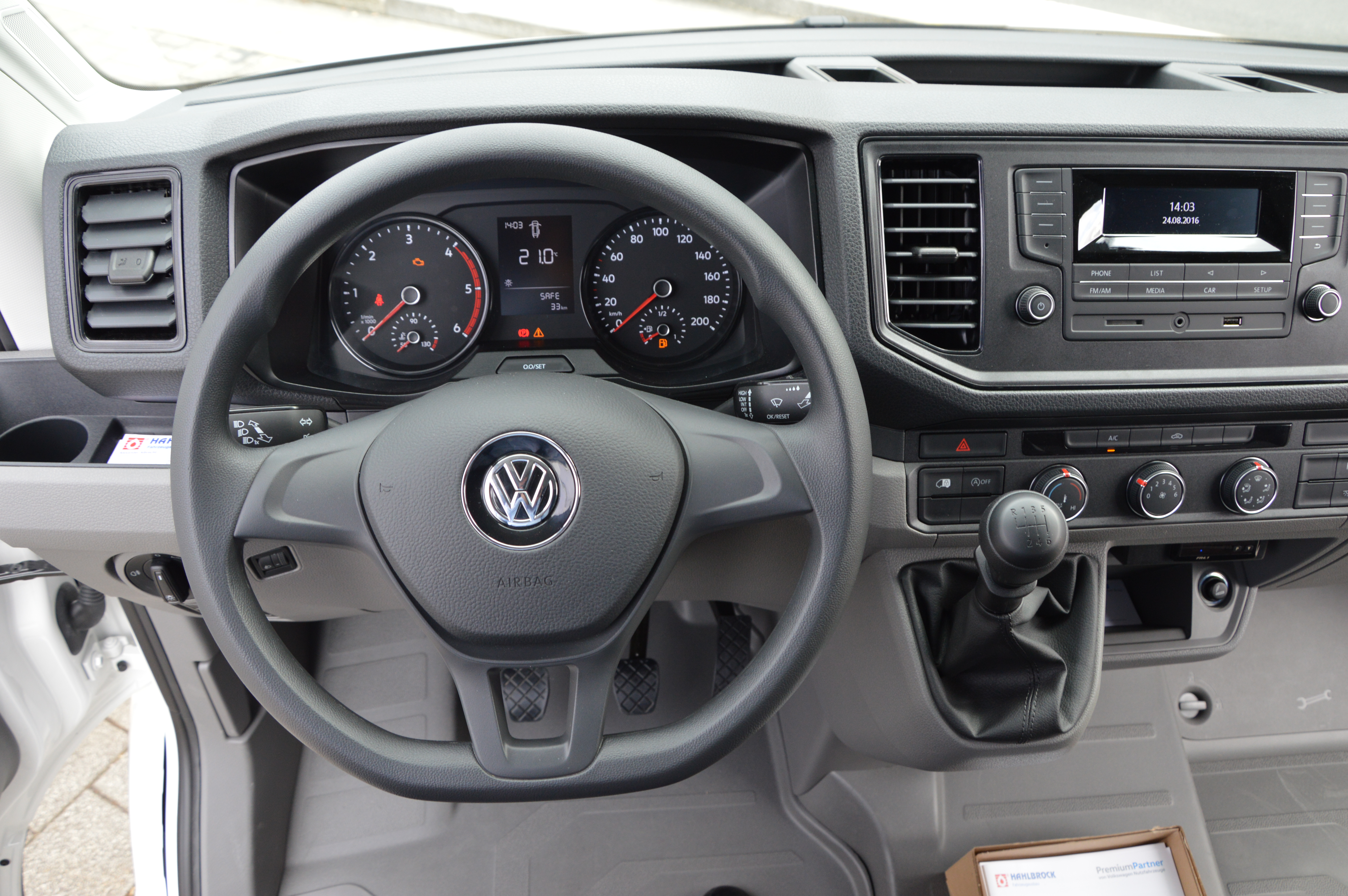
Second generation Crafter dashboard

=== Safety ===
ANCAP test results Volkswagen Crafter all van variants (2020)
Overall
Grading:	44% (Silver)

=== Engines ===
Engines (2017–)
Model	Engine type	Power	rpm	Torque	rpm	European emission standards
2.0 TDI CR	1,968 cc (120 cu in) I4 turbo	109 PS (80 kW; 108 hp)	3500	300 N⋅m (221 lb⋅ft)	1500–2250	Euro 6
2.0 TDI CR	1,968 cc (120 cu in) I4 turbo	114 PS (84 kW; 112 hp)	3500	300 N⋅m (221 lb⋅ft)	1500–2250	Euro 6
2.0 TDI CR	1,968 cc (120 cu in) I4 turbo	140 PS (103 kW; 138 hp)	3500	340 N⋅m (251 lb⋅ft)	1575–2250	Euro 6
2.0 BiTDI CR	1,968 cc (120 cu in) I4 turbo	179 PS (132 kW; 177 hp)	3600	400 N⋅m (295 lb⋅ft)	1800	Euro 6

=== e-Crafter ===
In September 2016, Volkswagen unveiled the e-Crafter all electric van at the IAA Commercial Vehicles show in Hanover. The concept e-Crafter has a 43 kWh battery that delivers an estimated range of 208 km (129 mi). The van payload is rated at 1,709 kg, and cargo space is listed at 11.3 cubic meters. The e-Crafter has a 100 kW (136 PS; 134 hp) and 290 N⋅m (214 lb⋅ft) electric motor, and top speed is limited to 80 km/h (50 mph). The electric van was production ready, with initial retail deliveries slated for 2017.

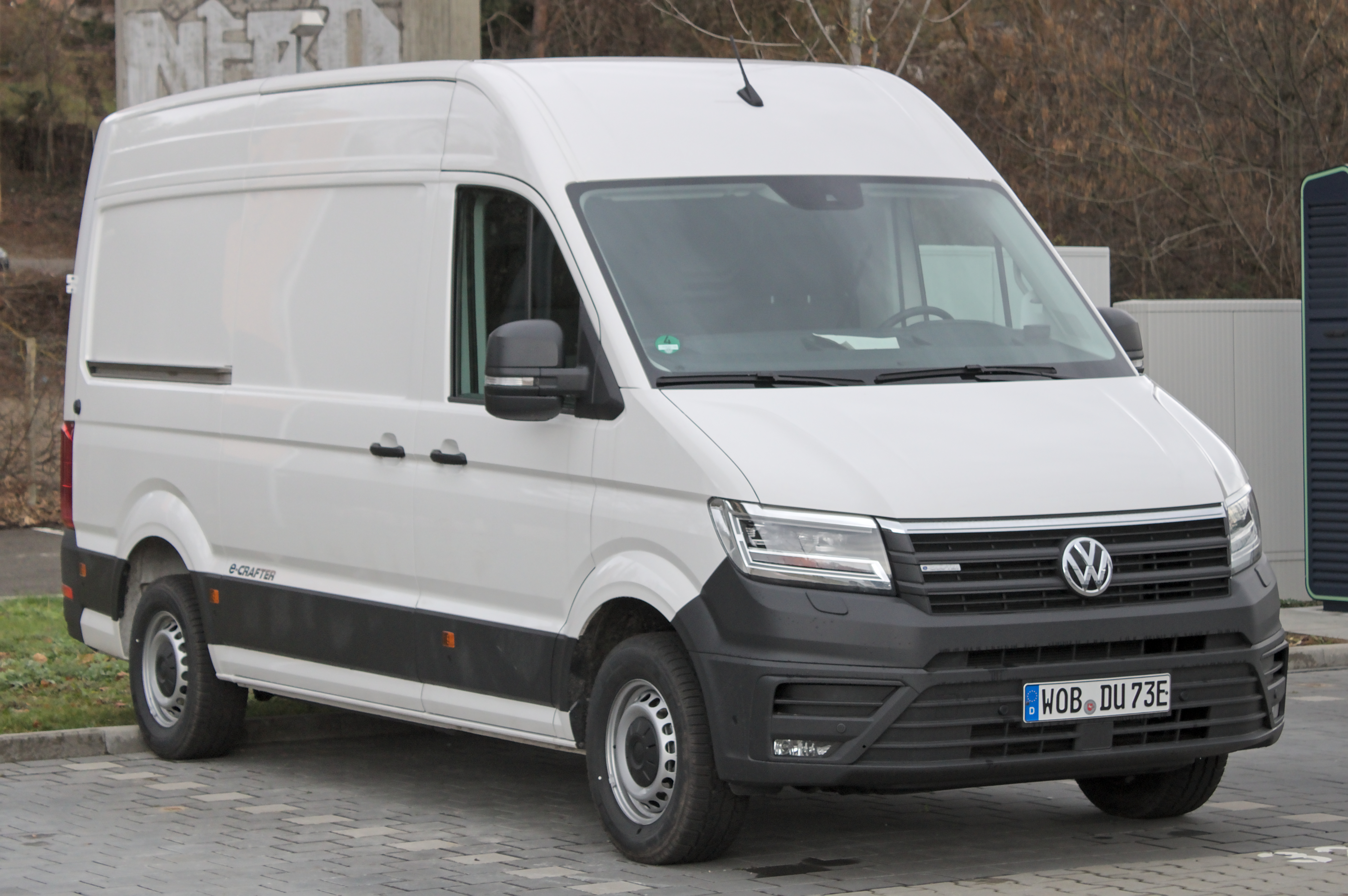
e-Crafter front

=== Grand California ===
At the 2017 IAA Frankfurt Motor Show, Volkswagen presented the California XXL motorhome concept, based on the Crafter. The 6.2 m long vehicle has a standing height of 2.2 m and is equipped with underfloor heating. The production version was named Grand California and the model went on sale in 2019. It is the larger version of the Volkswagen Transporter based Volkswagen California.

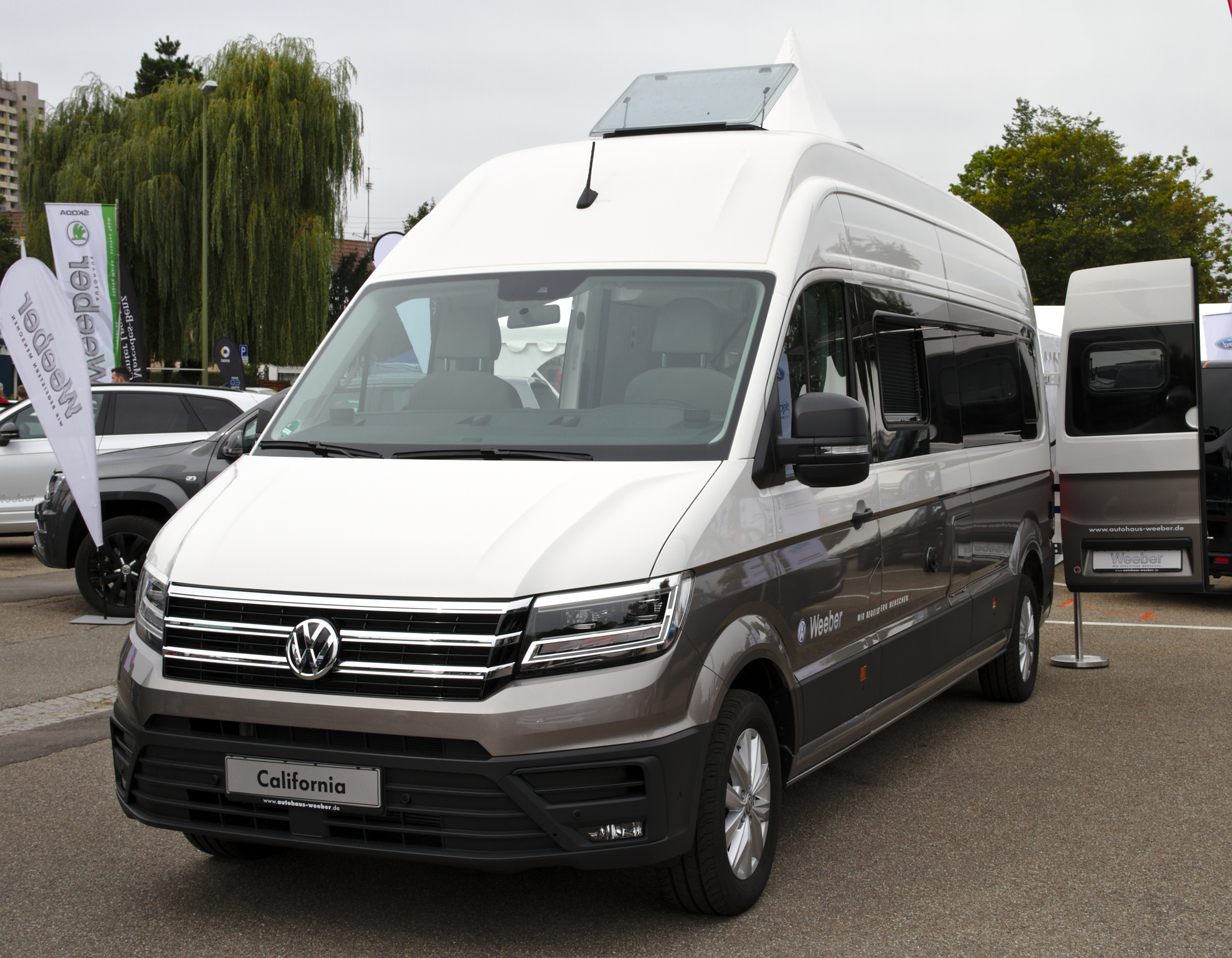
Grand California LWB front

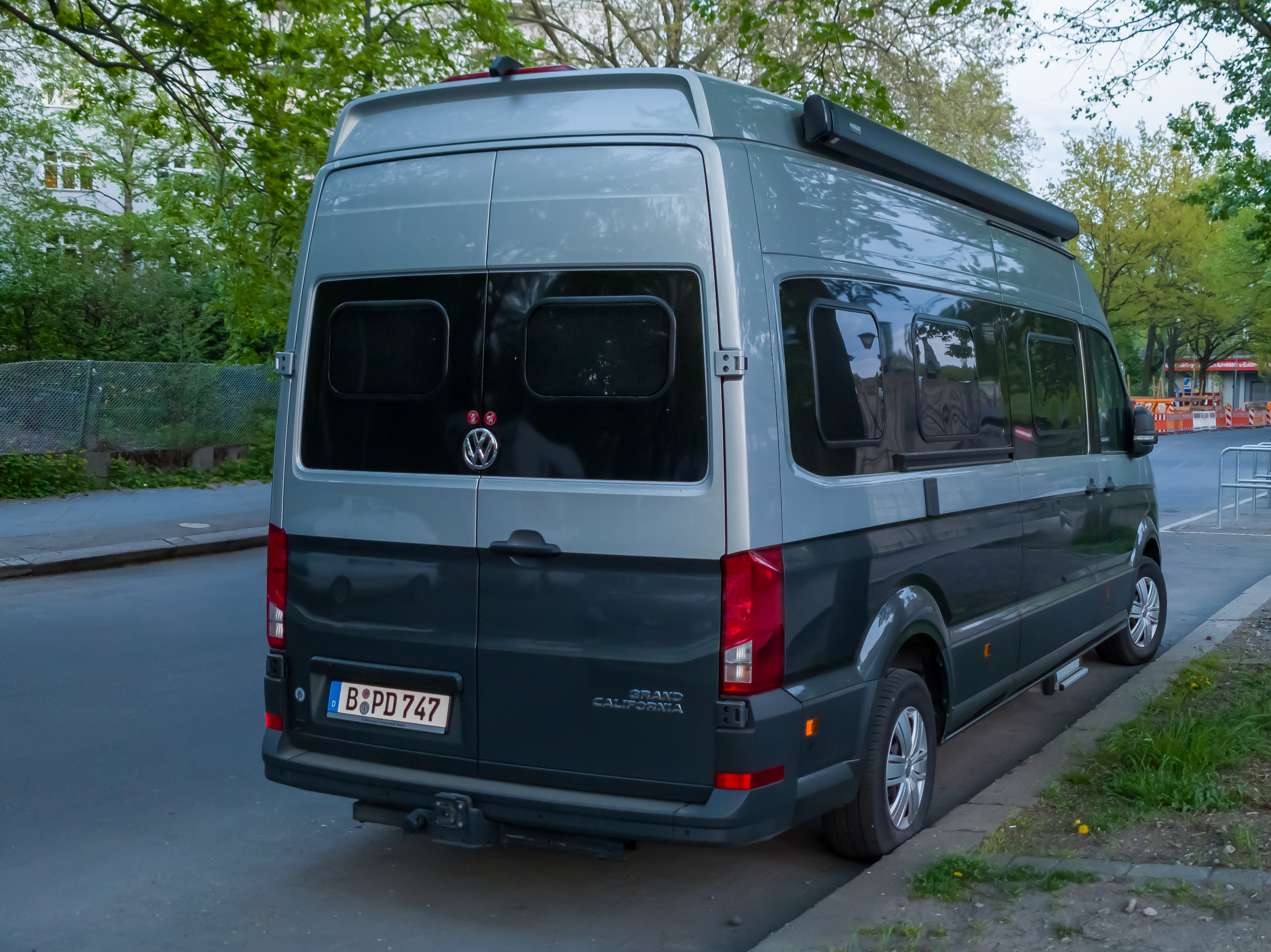
Grand California LWB rear

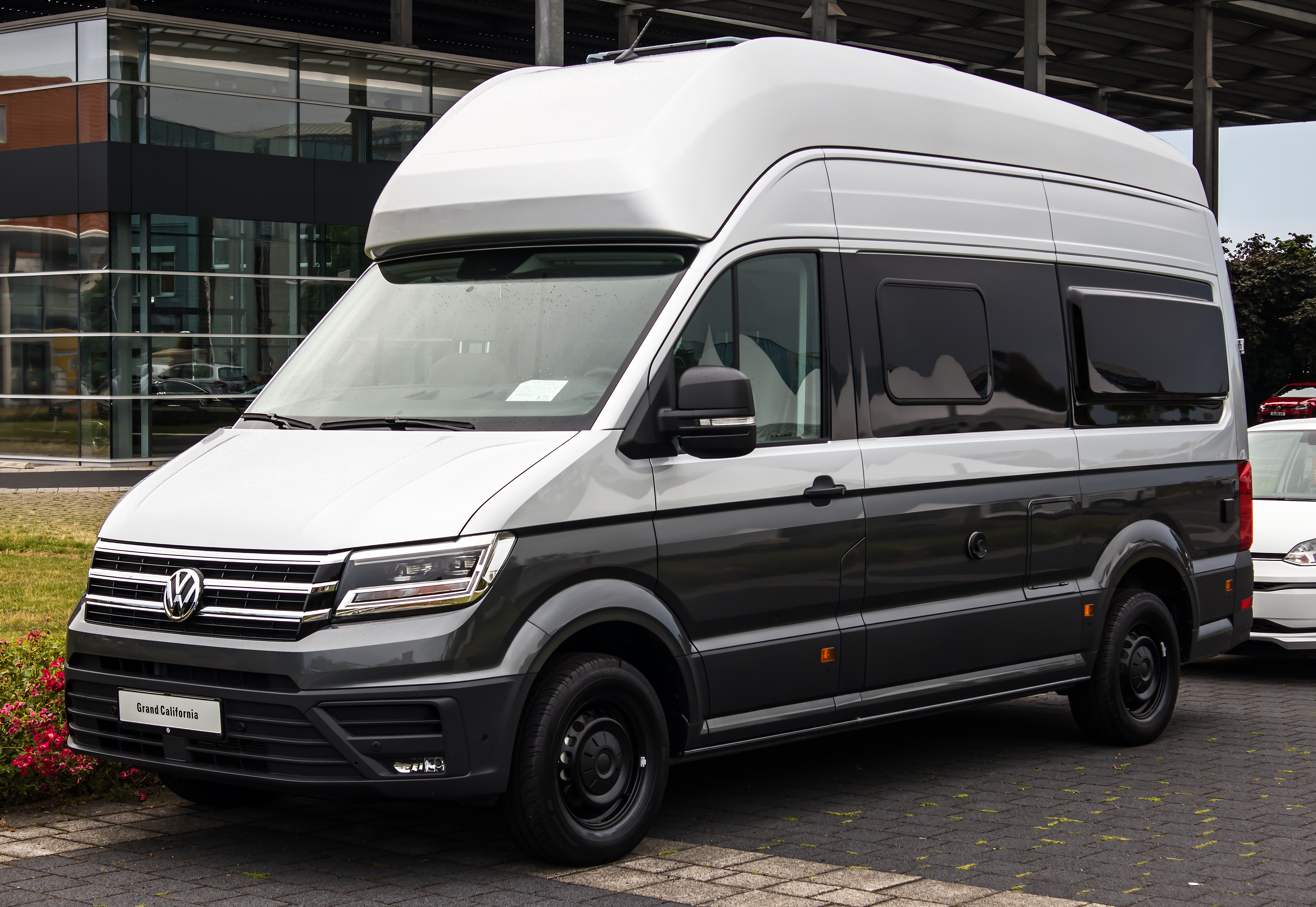
Grand California front

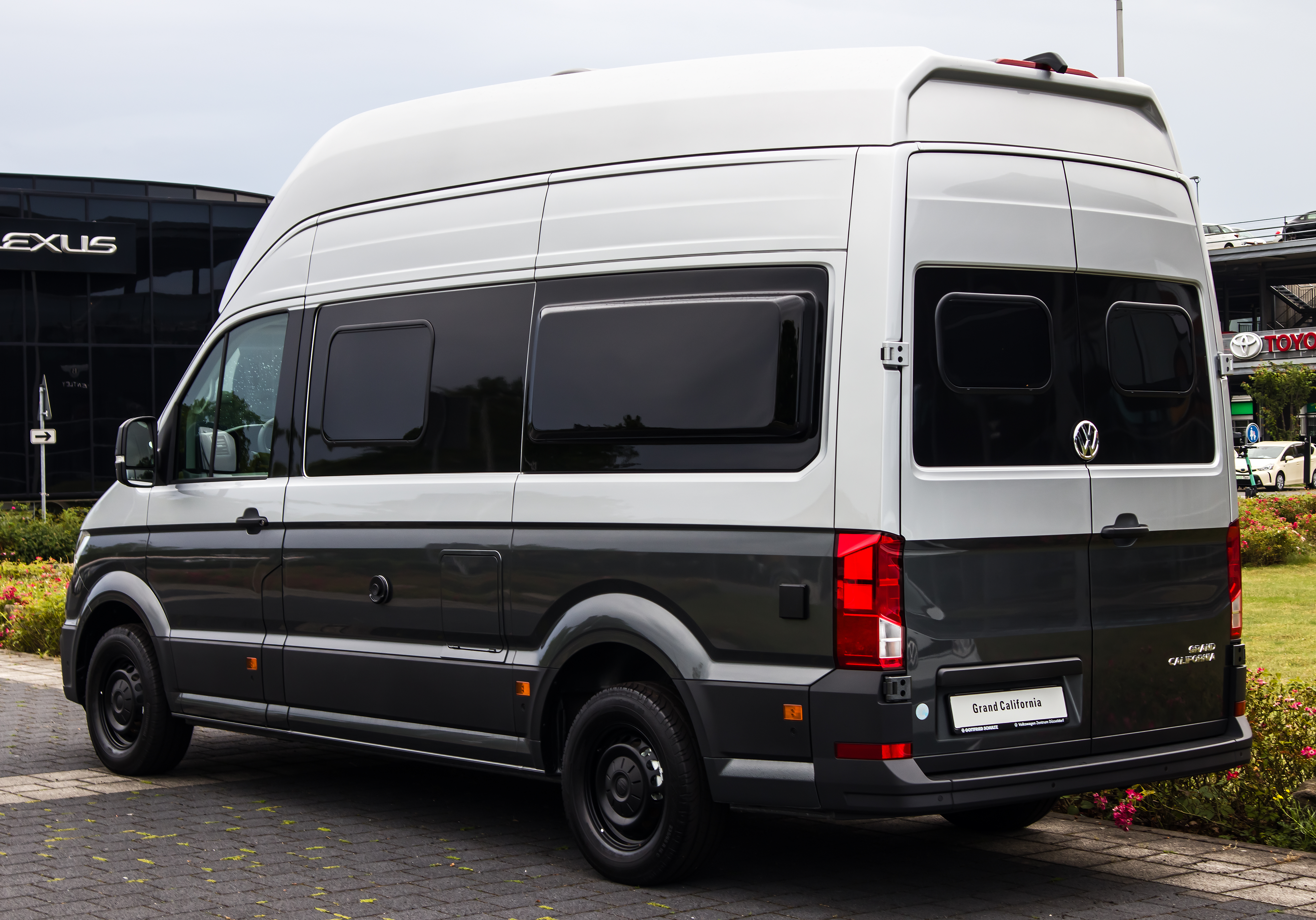
Grand California rear

=== MAN TGE ===
The second generation Crafter is also sold by MAN Truck & Bus as the MAN TGE. MAN is a brand of TRATON, which is the Volkswagen Group's heavy commercial vehicle division. The MAN TGE has a wide range of body types, with the van primarily being sold as a panel van, but also available as a tipper, dropside or crew cab variant.

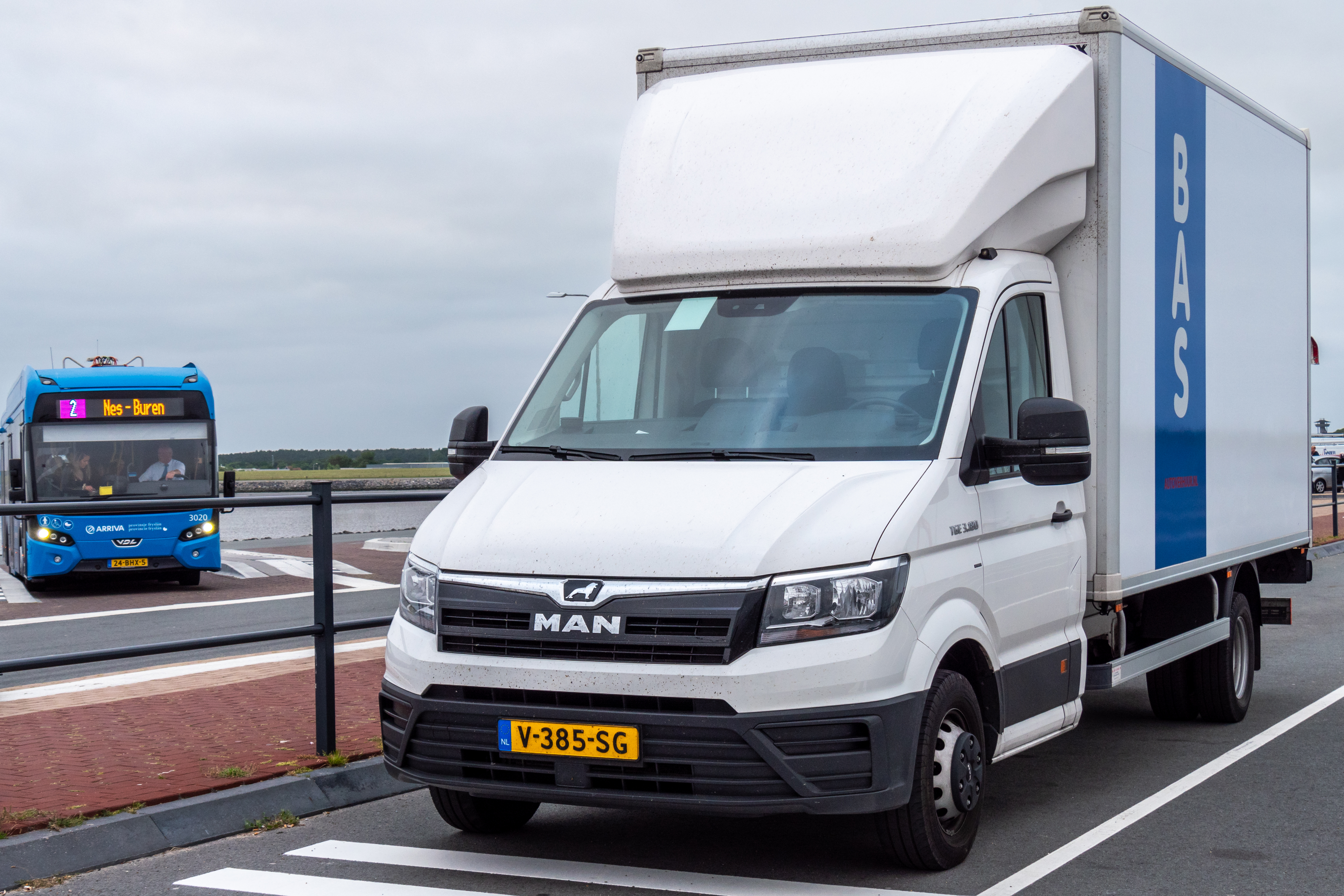
MAN TGE 3.180 in the Netherlands

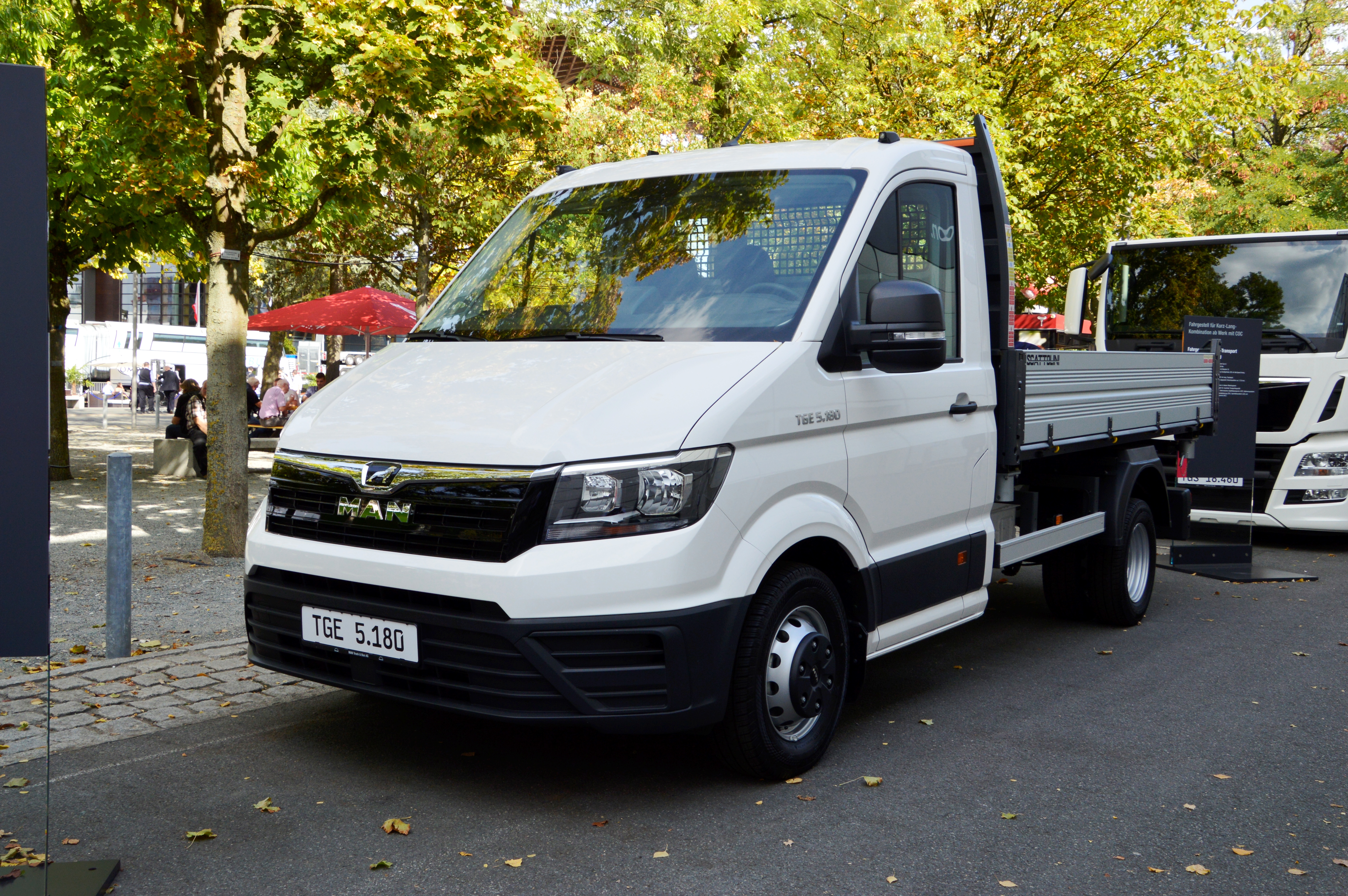
A MAN TGE 5.180 spotted in Germany

==== MAN eTGE ====
The all-electric MAN eTGE was unveiled in March 2018 and entered series production in July that year. It can carry up to 1,700 kg (3,700 lb) of load. The maximum power of its permanently excited synchronous motor is 100 kW (134 hp), the maximum torque over the entire speed range is 290 N⋅m (214 lbf⋅ft). The maximum speed is limited to 90 km/h (56 mph), and the purchase price was around 69,500 euros in 2018. 35.8 kWh battery with 112 km WLTP range, 7.2 kW AC and 40 kW DC charging.

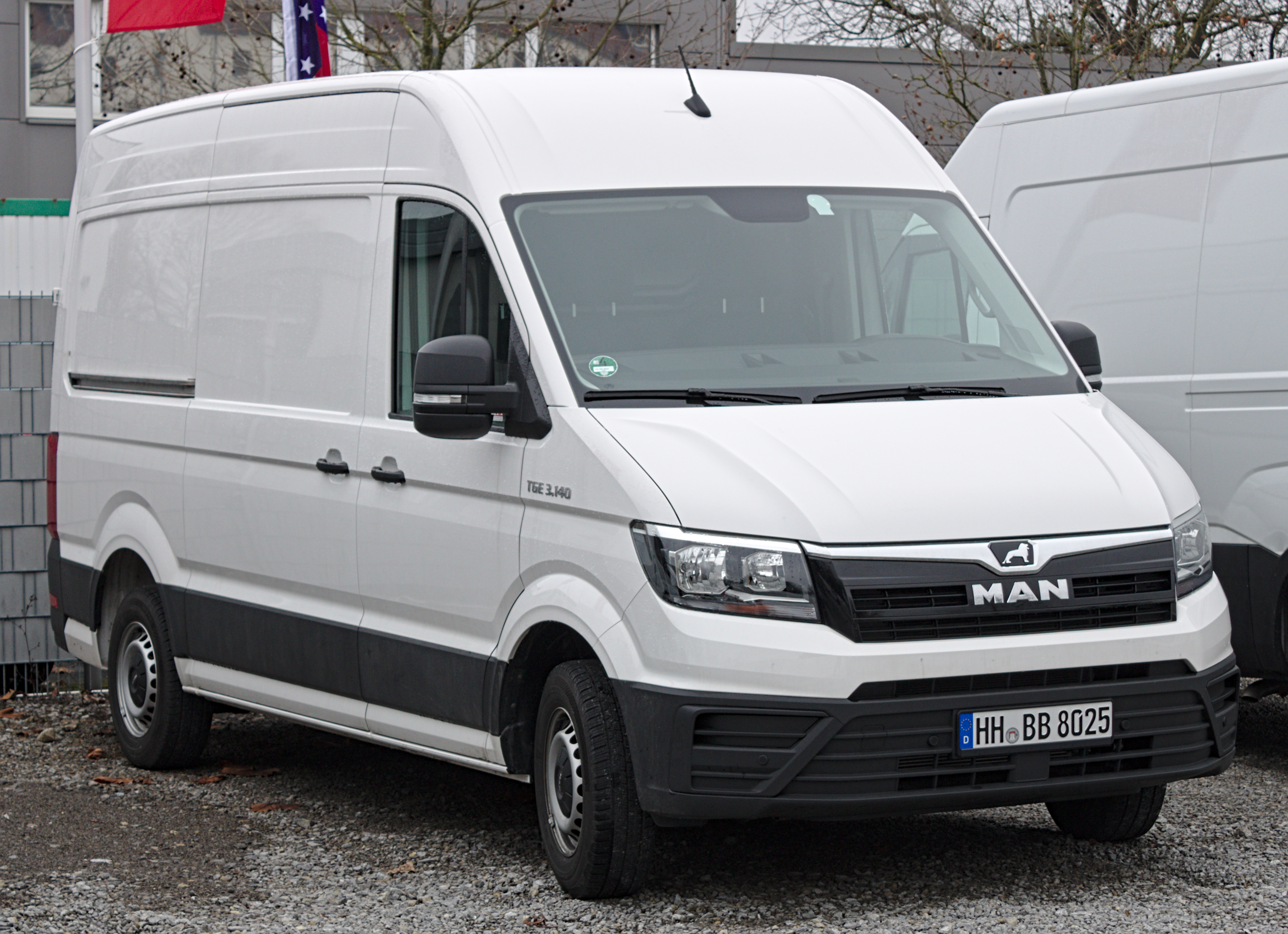
MAN TGE

== Military variants ==
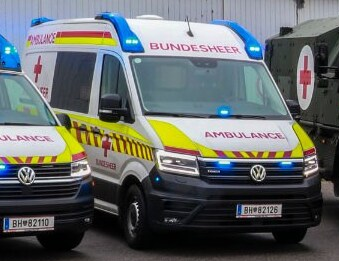
Austrian Army

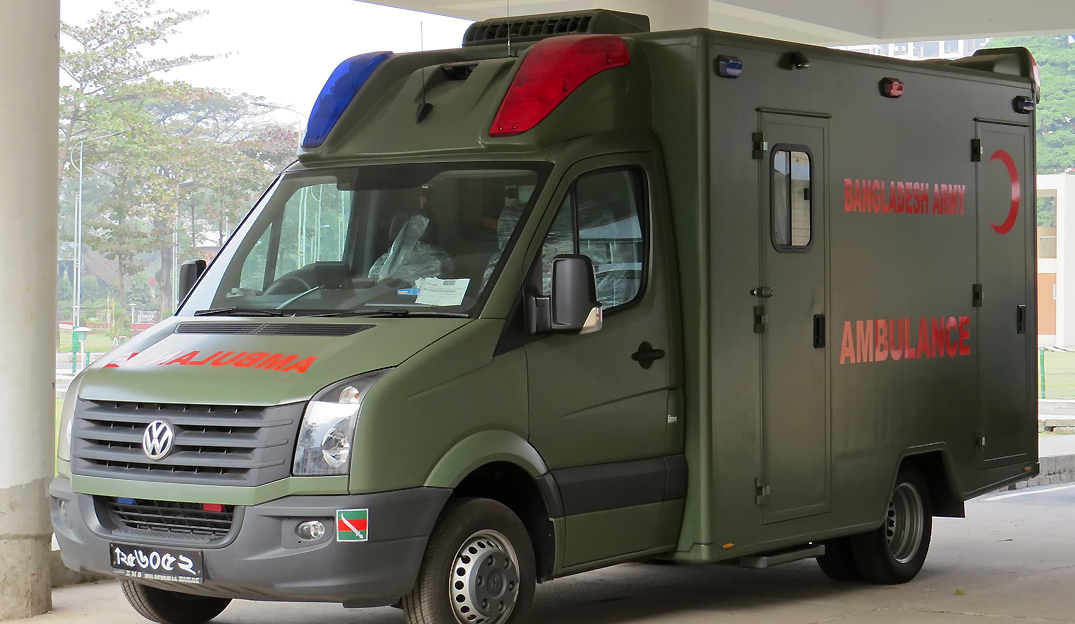
Bangladesh Army

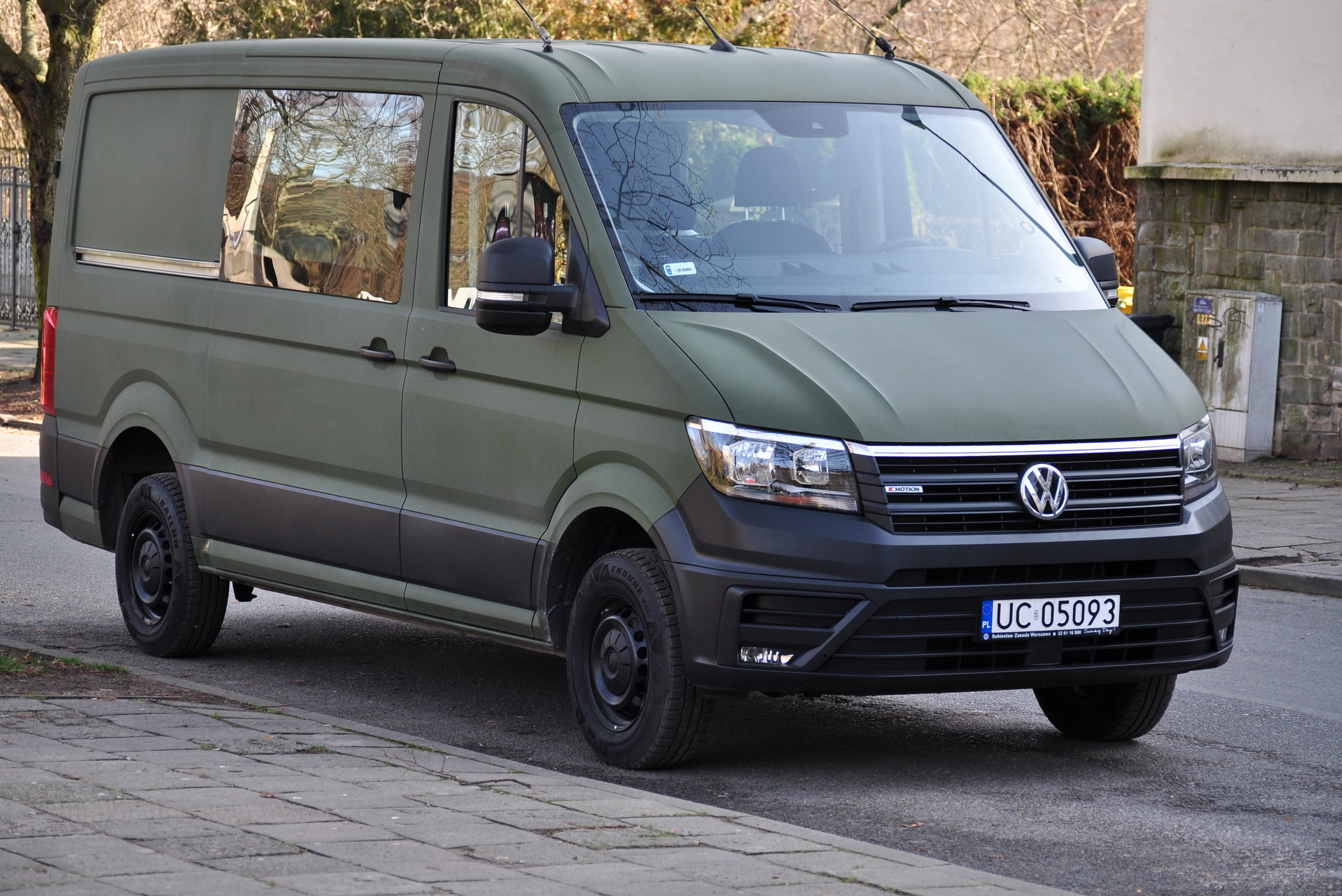
Polish Army

=== Current operators ===
Austria (20)
The Austria uses 20 VW Crafter 4-Motion ambulances ("Notarztwagen", in civilian colours). It was introduced in service in 2022.
Bangladesh (12)
12 VW Crafter ICU ambulances supplied to the Bangladesh Army from the UN Support Activities.
Netherlands (28)
- VW Crafter used by the Dutch Ministry of Defence to equipped the forces for the EODD mission. Those transport demining robots and all the equipment for the mission.
- 15 MAN TGE 5.160 purchased by the Dutch Ministry of Defence to equipped the forces for the EODD mission. Those transport demining robots and all the equipment for the mission.
Poland (224)
Several orders of VW Crafter and MAN TGE:
- Order of 90 VW Crafter in August 2017, for the 2nd Regional Logistics Base in Warsaw, it will be configured for cargo or for passenger transport.
- MAN TGE, orders 2020 (134 firm, 128 as an option):
  - 57 MAN TGE light-duty general-purpose vehicles in May (option for 56 vehicles).
  - 25 MAN TGE minibuses in May (option for 24 vehicles).
  - 52 MAN TGE low-capacity, high-mobility vehicles in July (option for 48 vehicles).
Portugal (3)
The Portuguese Army possesses non-tactical ambulances for patient transport since 2010.
Slovenia
Ambulances purchased for the Slovenian Army.
Sweden (28)
The Swedish air force ordered 28 vehicles for a C3 role (command, control, communications) and it aims at improving the tactical mobility of the command. It is equipped with communications equipment, IT equipment.
Ukraine (1)
- 1 MAN TGE donated by Norway to the Ukrainian border guards for radiation control.

=== Collaborations ===
==== RMMV / Torsus Terrastorm ====
RMMV and Torsus have entered a strategic partnership to develop a special operations vehicle based on the a modified variant of the VW Crafter / MAN TGE. Torsus developed an off-road van, the Terrastorm.
