= Volkswagen LT =

Light commercial panel van produced by Volkswagen

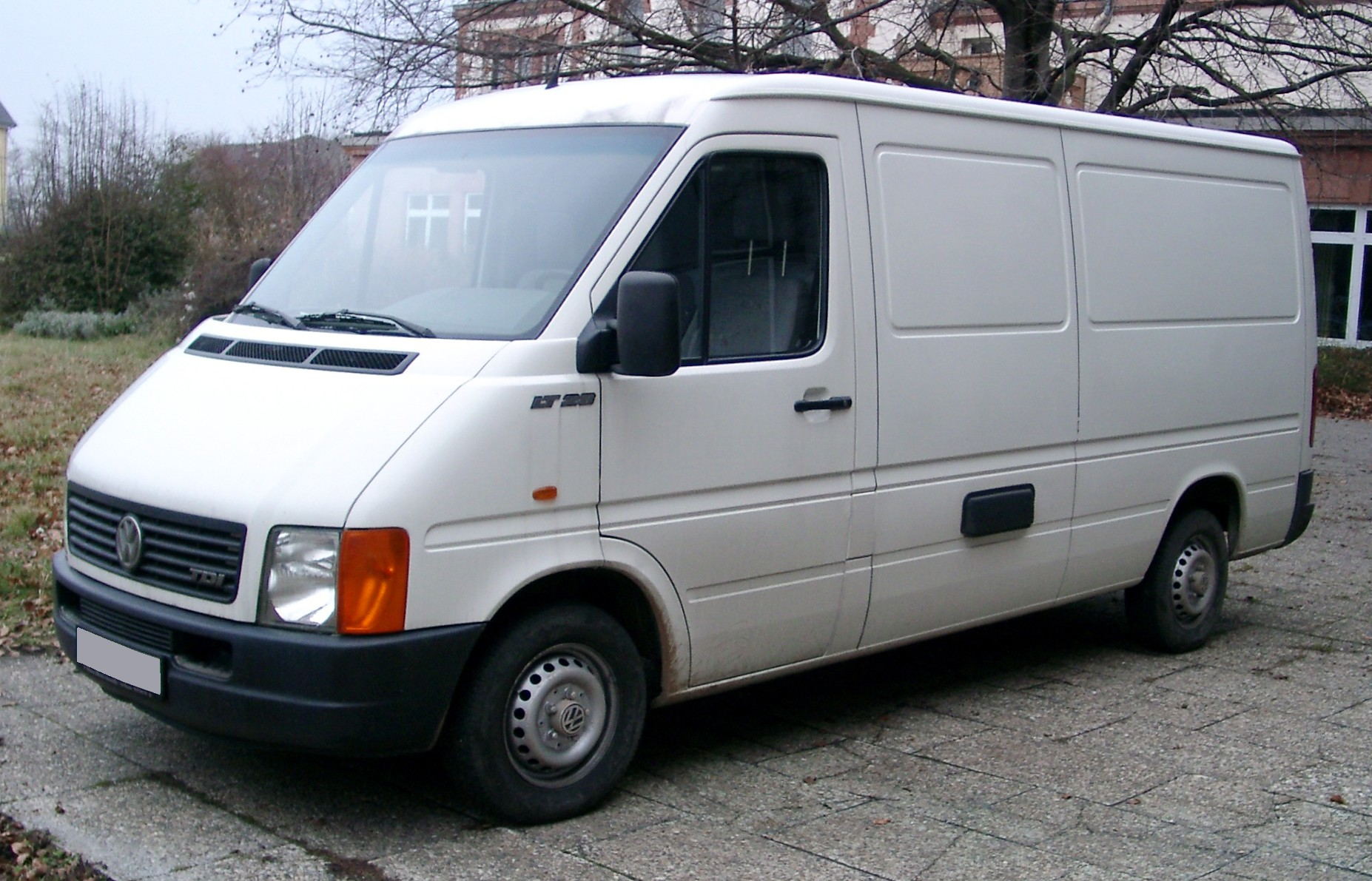

Overview
- Manufacturer: Volkswagen; Volkswagen Commercial Vehicles
- Production: Typ 28: April 1975 – July 1991; Typ 21: August 1991 – December 1995; Typ 2D: May 1996 – December 2005

Body and chassis
- Class: Light commercial vehicle (M)
- Body style: Van (Cargo/Passenger), Pickup, Minibus, Crew cab, Chassis cab
- Layout: Front engine, rear-wheel drive or four-wheel drive
- Platform: Volkswagen Group/Daimler AG LT/T1N platform series

Chronology
- Successor: Volkswagen Crafter

The Volkswagen LT is the largest light commercial panel van produced by Volkswagen (and subsequently Volkswagen Commercial Vehicles as of 1996) from 1975 to 2006, before being replaced by the Crafter. Two generations were produced.

== 1st generation LT (Typ 28/Typ 21) ==
Volkswagen LT (1st generation)
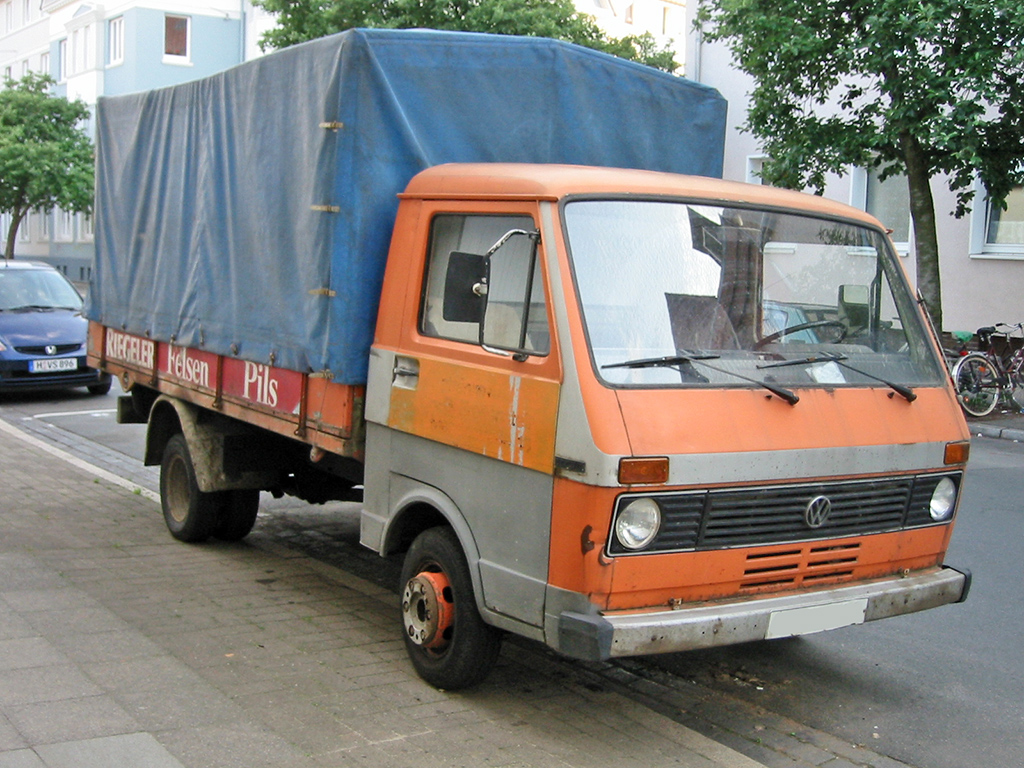

Overview
- Manufacturer: Volkswagen
- Also called: MAN G-Series; Pegaso Ekus (Spain); Peterbilt Midranger (North America)
- Production: April 1975 – December 1995
- Assembly: Germany: Hanover (Volkswagenwerk Hanover)

Body and chassis
- Related: Volkswagen L80; Volkswagen Worker; Volkswagen Delivery

Powertrain
- Engine: Petrol: 2.0 L EA831 I4 (1975–1982); 2.4 L I6 (1983–1996); Diesel: 2.4 L D24 I6 (1978–1996); 2.4 L D24T turbo I6 (1983–1992); 2.4 L D24TIC turbo I6 (1993–1996); 2.8 L Perkins P4165 I4 (1976–1977)
- Transmission: 4-speed manual; 5-speed dog-leg manual

Dimensions
- Wheelbase: Short: 2,500 mm (98.4 in); Long: 2,950 mm (116.1 in); Super Long: 3,650 mm (143.7 in)
- Length: 4,795–6,560 mm (189–258 in)
- Width: panelvan/pickup-chassis/doka-chassis: 2,085 mm (82.1 in); flatbed-pickup/flatbed-doka: 2,140 mm (84.3 in)
- Kerb weight: 2,699–5,600 kg (5,950–12,346 lb)

=== History ===
Volkswagen introduced the Volkswagen Type 2 in 1950 and developed light commercial vehicle versions for German and European markets. The name "Kombi" (the name under which the Type 2 was sold in Brazil) established itself as a concept term to describe an entire light commercial vehicle segment. The automaker introduced the revised Volkswagen Type 2 (T2) in 1967. Commercial customers were shipping heavier and larger-volume freight. The Volkswagen Type 2 platform was also limited by its rear-mounted engine design. A total of 471,221 series 1 LTs were produced between 1975 and 1996.

=== Design ===
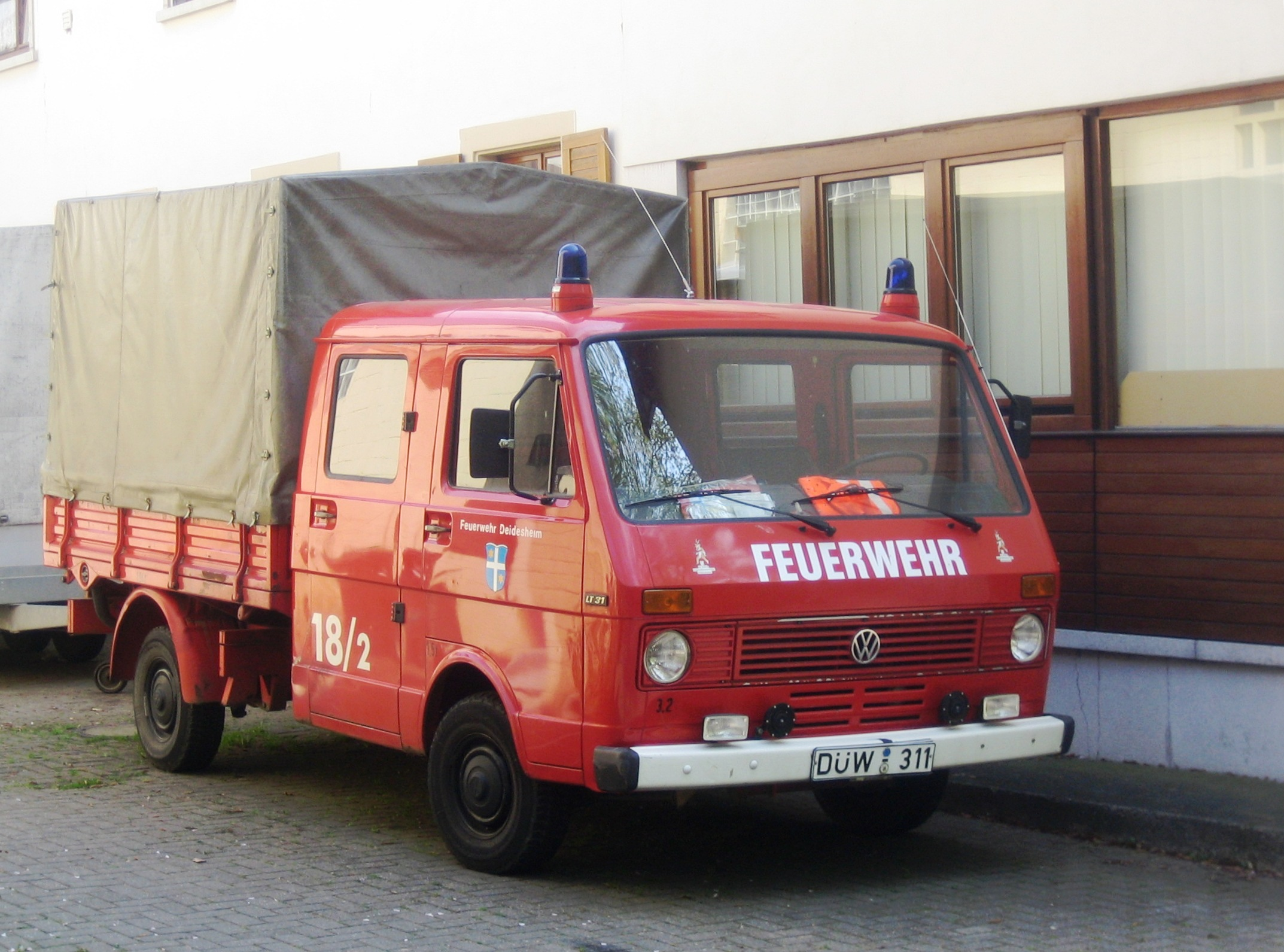
Early LT 31 double chassis cab

The new design specifications for a larger transporter as an additional series ranged from 2.8 tons gross vehicle weight to 3.5 tons. The layout was a conventional rear drive with the engine located above the front axle, in a forward control or 'cab over' design.

The new Volkswagen van was launched in 1975 in Berlin. The name given to Volkswagen's large transporter was as functional as the entire vehicle: it was just called LT, which is simply the abbreviation of Lasten-Transporter (that basically means heavy load transporter or cargo transporter).

The LT came in three gross vehicle weights, from 2.8 to 3.5 tons (LT 28, LT 31, LT 35), with two wheelbases, two roof options, and with bodywork options as a panel van, a compact, a platform vehicle, and a chassis cab combination.

The design featured a high ratio of utility space to footprint due to its forward control design and overall width of 2.085 metres (6 ft 10.1 in). The compact LT panel van (with a little over four and a half metres in length) offered an interior load length of over three metres and a load area of around 5.5 square metres.

=== Suspension/Axles ===
The LT was equipped with a front axle with independent front wheel suspension. Later options, such as the heavy LT 40 to LT 55, had a solid front axle to achieve increased load-carrying capacity as is common for light trucks.

=== Facelifts ===
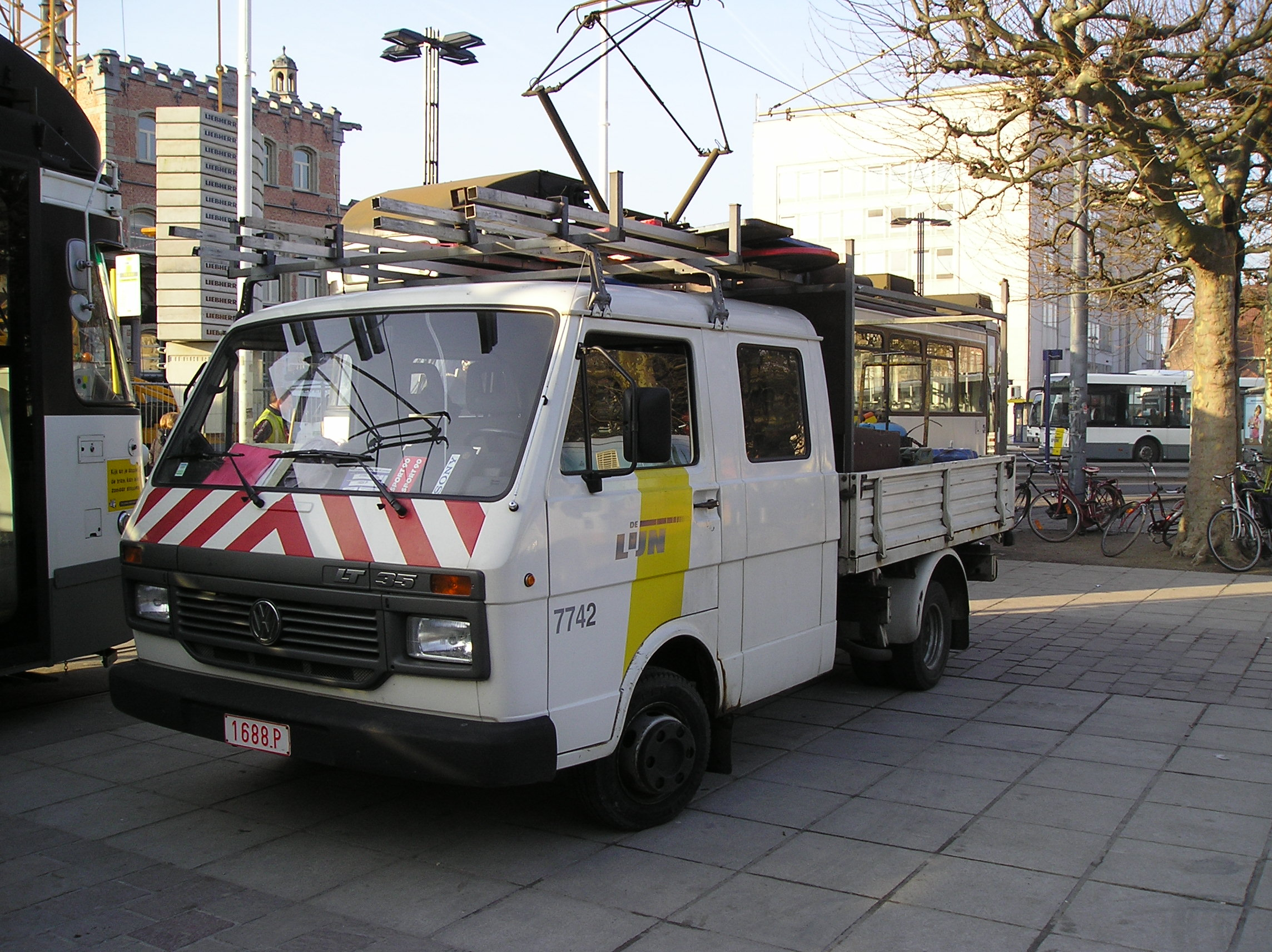
First generation, post-facelift LT

The first facelift in 1983 changed mostly the interior, at the same time as the engine cover was changed and the turbo-diesel and inline-6 petrol engines were introduced. A redesigned dashboard was added and various other small things were changed. The undercarriage had an additional third wheelbase as an option for platform-type vehicles, at up to 4.6 metres in length.

Two years later, Volkswagen again increased the gross vehicle weight, with the 5.6 ton LT 55. It was available with a single-tyre rear axle, allowing for more space between rear wheel wells inside the cargo floor. An LT with four-wheel drive that could be enabled from within the cab was also available.

The next facelift in 1986 changed the round headlights to rectangular units, along with other minor cosmetic retouches.

In Spring 1993, there was again a modest change in the look, with new grey-plastic elements introduced to the radiator grille and in the rear lighting section. The diesel engines were replaced with a more modern version of the same block. The DW (N/A diesel) was replaced by the ACT engine and the DV (turbo-diesel) engines were replaced by the intercooled ACL engine. Additionally, the engine cover was replaced with a new version, that had an opening in the front allowing to check the coolant without having to open the entire engine cover.

=== Campervan versions ===
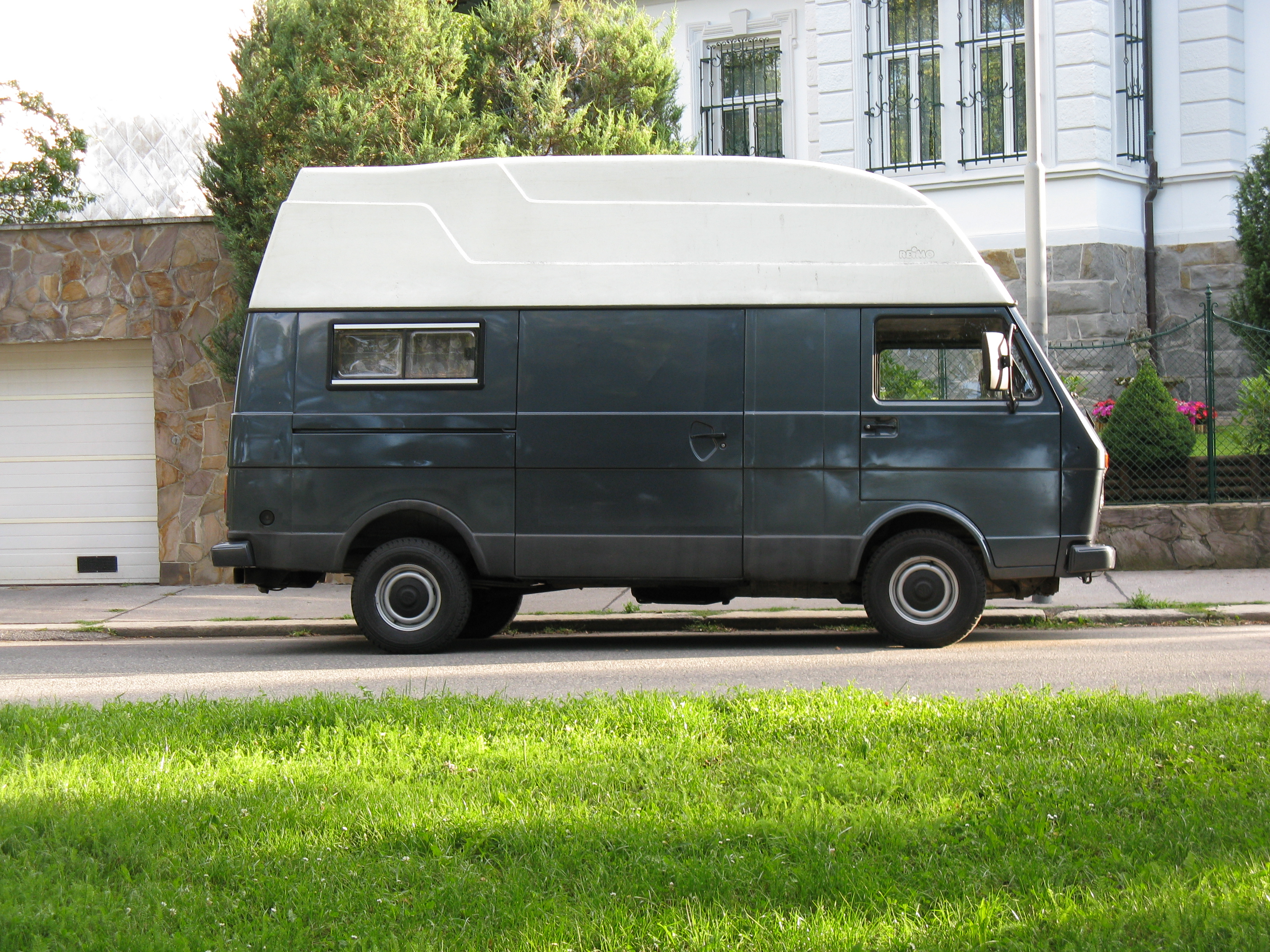
LT 35e LWB with a custom camper high roof

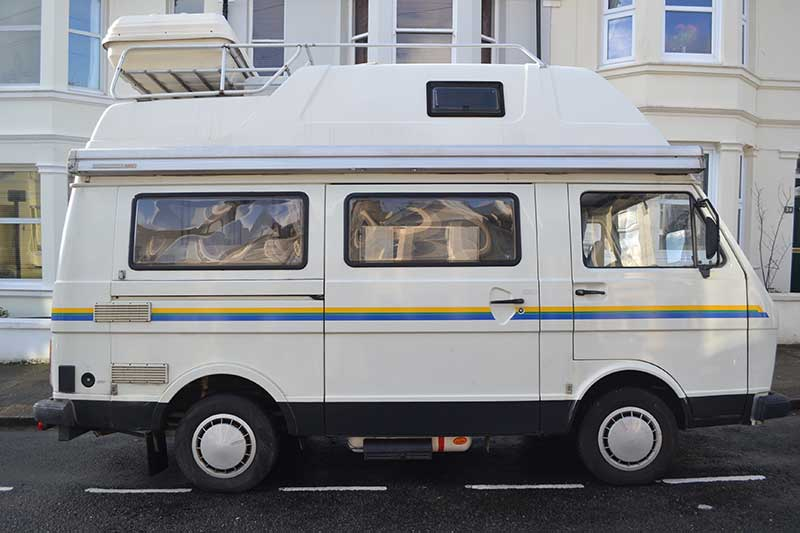
Volkswagen LT Mk 1 Westfalia campervan conversion 1989 – 1993

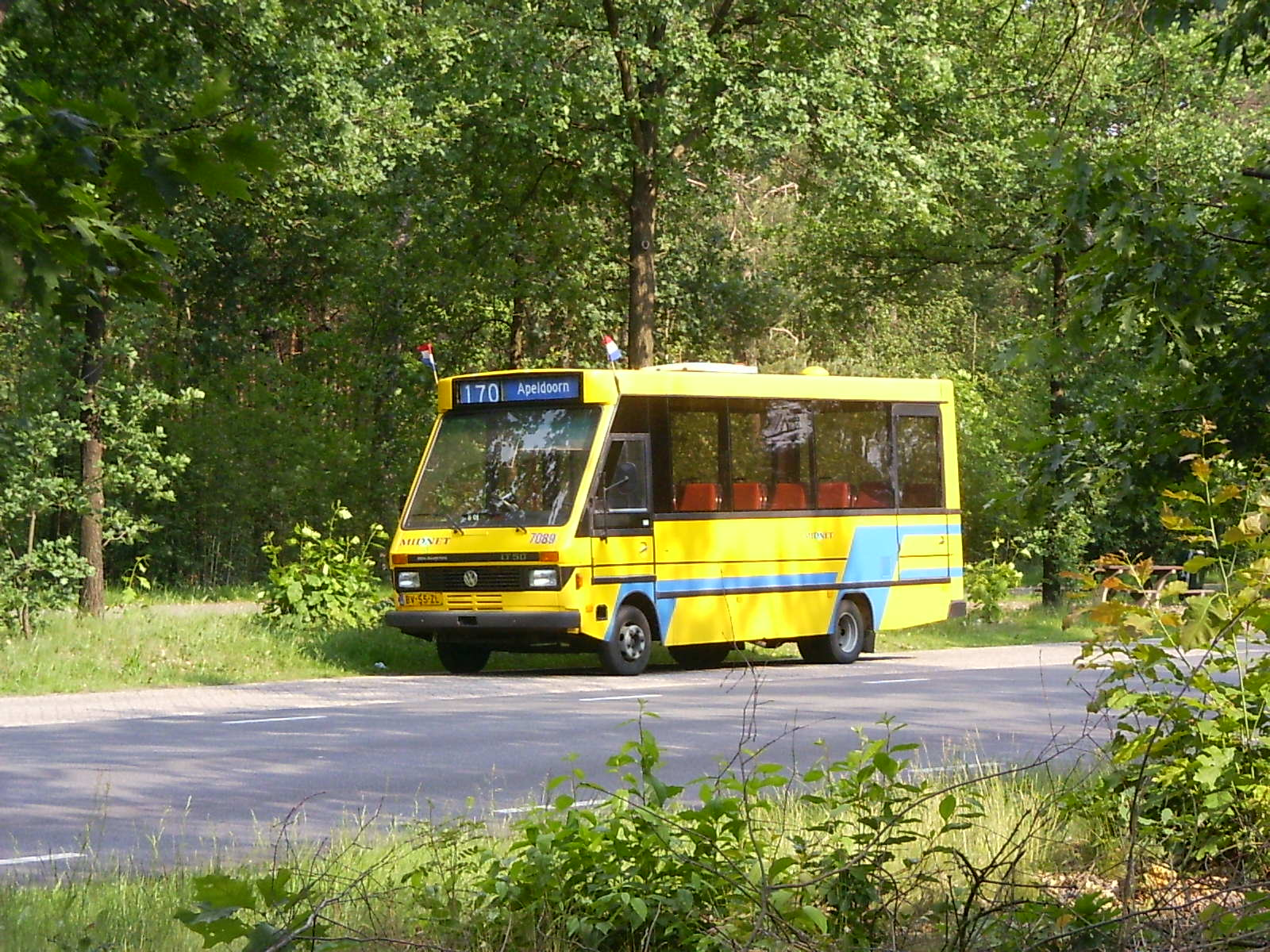
Defunct Dutch minibus based on LT 50 chassis

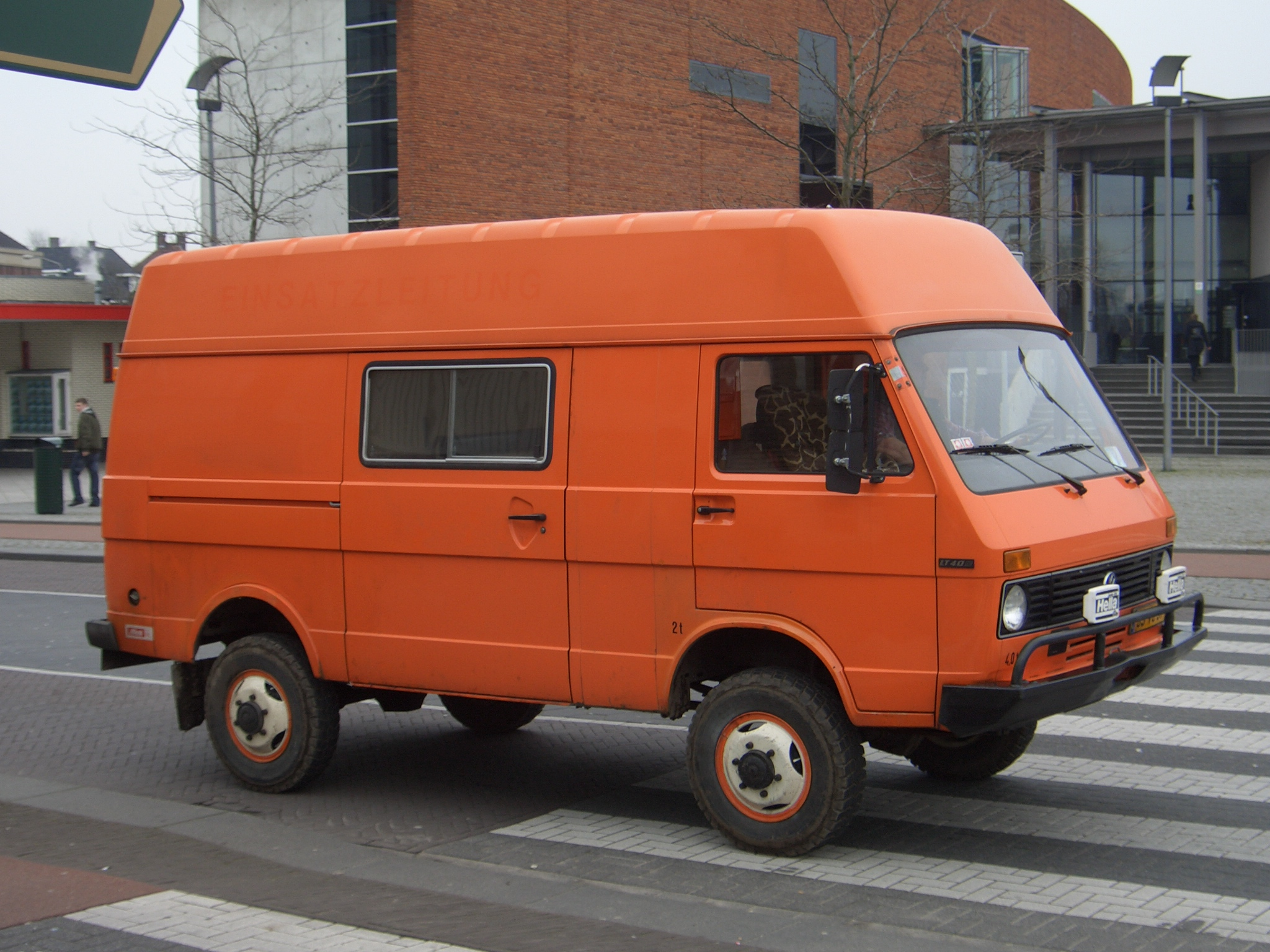
1980 LT 40D Sülzer 4x4

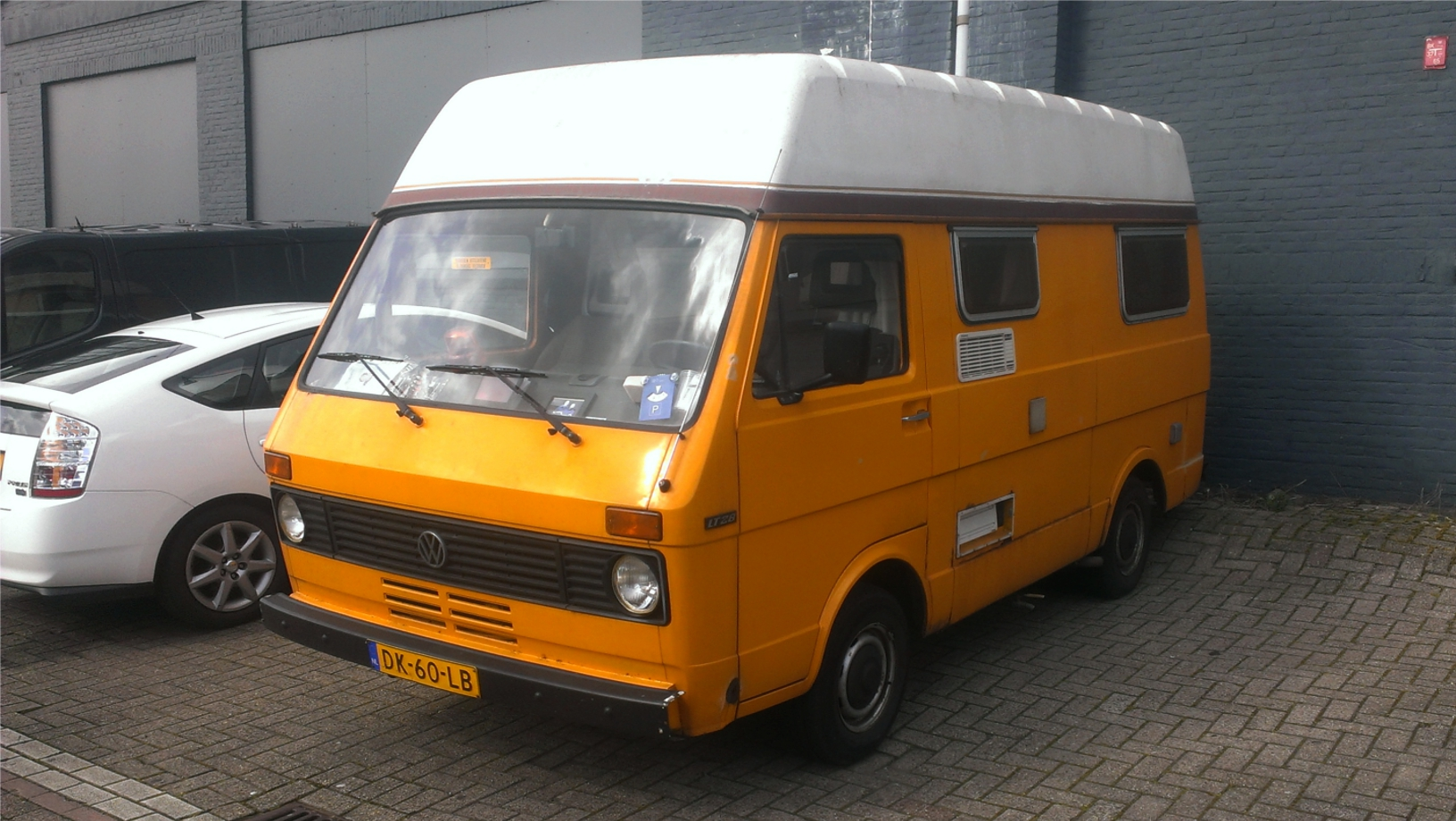
Volkswagen LT 28 converted to a campervan

A touring camper in its various bodywork and fitting options was also produced. The vehicle's width allowed the possibility of beds arranged crosswise. Various Volkswagen-endorsed Westfalia campervan models were available for the LT, including the Sven Hedin, and a later model, Florida. The LT was also used by Karmann who produced over 3,000 Karmann LT Distance Wide coachbuilt motorhomes.

=== Truck cabs ===
The "G Series" light truck was a joint venture between Volkswagen and MAN AG, with gross vehicle weights of between six and ten tons. It was built from 1979 until 1993.

Volkswagen's Brazilian plant at Resende has been constructing trucks with weights of between 7 and 35 tons. Even after the launch of the new Volkswagen Constellation in 2006, Volkswagen Commercial Vehicles has continued to manufacture vehicles incorporating cabs based on the first generation of the LT, such as the Worker and Delivery trucks.

=== Rebadging ===
In the late eighties, German-built Volkswagen LT and MAN-VW G were sold in Spain as Pegaso Ekus, while Brazilian-built units were marketed in the US as Peterbilt Midrangers.

=== 4x4 ===
A 4x4 version of the LT was also produced. Volkswagen had already prepared for this in 1983 with the cab facelift, which incorporated instrumentation lights for the front, centre, and rear differential locks.

Sülzer developed a 6-cylinder, primarily diesel-powered, 4x4 version of the long-wheelbase VW LT, of which 156 were built. These were either LT40 or LT45 (rated 4 or 4.5 tonne). Opposed to the normal LT40 & LT45, the 4x4s only had single wheels on the rear axle. The chassis is lifted, 26 mm anti-roll bars are added to cope with body-roll and the axles are replaced. A propshaft driven, rod/shaft controlled transfer box was installed under the vehicle.

The transfer box was a New Process 208, which is propshaft-driven and cable-operated. The same transfer box can also be found in Chevrolet Blazers and Jeep Cherokees of around the same time. The first six of the Sülzer vehicles are supposed to have had Dana 70 axles. After that production was changed to use the Italian-built Clark-Hurth axles. All 4x4 LTs came as standard with rear and centre locking differentials, with optional front diff-lock also available (until it became standard fitment in 1991).

Due to the change of axles, the 4x4 LTs came with different wheels to the standard LTs. All 4x4 LTs have 6 stud tube type split-rims in 6.5J width. The standard tyre fitment on these wheels is 7.00x16 or 7.50x16.

In 1985 VW took over the production of the 4x4 LT and introduced the DW (2.4 inline-6 N/A diesel) and DV (2.4 inline-6 turbo-diesel) engines to the portfolio. They made another 1250 or so 4x4 LTs. The model portfolio covered only long-wheelbase vehicles. Tintop and hightop as LT40, pickup and double-cab as LT40 or LT45.

In 1991 the naturally aspirated diesel engine was dropped from the 4x4 program as it did not have enough power for the 4x4 drivetrain, with most 4x4 LTs being either the 90 bhp 6-cyl petrol or the 102 bhp 6-cyl D24T. From 1993 on, VW introduced the D24TIC with 95 bhp, but more torque, for the LT (and LT 4x4). At the same time the transfer box was upgraded to the New Process 241.

Steyr-Puch in Austria built the Noriker using VW LT underpinnings in competition with the Sülzer and VW LT 4x4s, but they only were produced in limited numbers.

De Vries also built three VW LT 4x4s on the same principle as Sülzer/VW, one of which was used in the Dakar Rally in 1983.

Out of 5 million Mk1 VW LTs built, only 1,250 featured four-wheel drive.

=== Typ codes ===
The Volkswagen "Typ codes" for the first generation LT were:

- Typ 28 — April 1975 to July 1991
- Typ 21 — August 1991 to December 1995
- Typ 29 — 4x4 1984 to 1989

The last first-generation LT was produced in 1996, which corresponds to a British 'P' registration plate. In 21 years, just under 500,000 vehicles were assembled.

=== Engines ===
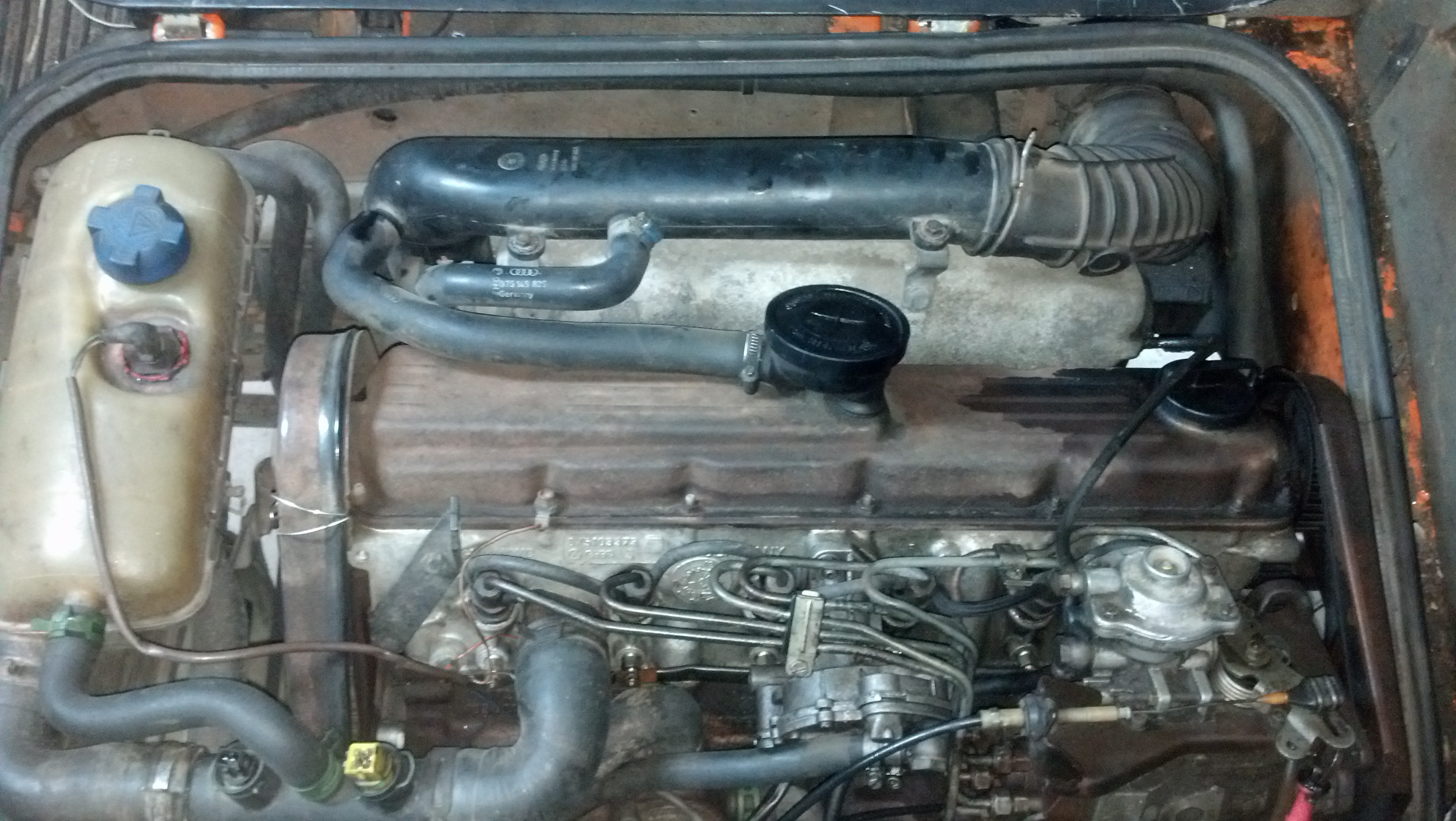
Volkswagen LT DV engine

The petrol engine was a modified Audi 100 VW EA831 2.0-litre inline four-cylinder. It was rated at 55 kilowatts (75 PS; 74 bhp) and achieved higher torque at lower engine RPMs.

An inline four-cylinder diesel engine by Perkins was available. The 48 kilowatts (65 PS; 64 bhp) 2.7 L diesel was included in the LT range from 1976 onwards. This engine was produced in part of the former Hanomag-Linden factory in Germany, which at the time was owned by Perkins' parent company, Massey Ferguson.

The Perkins engine was replaced in 1978 with a six-cylinder variant of the Volkswagen Golf diesel. The original 1.6 L four-cylinder engine became the D24 2.4 L six-cylinder, delivering 55 kW (75 PS; 74 bhp). This engine was also used in a number of Volvo passenger cars.

In December 1982, an upgrade to the LT was introduced. The six-cylinder diesel was available as a turbodiesel, the Volkswagen D24T engine, producing 75 kW (102 PS; 101 bhp) and 195 N⋅m (144 lbf⋅ft) of torque. In addition, the six-cylinder engine was now also available as a 66 kW (90 PS; 89 bhp) petrol engine. All engines were now mounted with a clear offset alignment that allowed for a flatter engine compartment, which was shifted further to the rear for more space for a third seat in the cab.

In 1992, an overhauled turbo-diesel engine with charge air cooler and 70 kW (95 PS; 94 bhp) was introduced – the Volkswagen D24TIC engine.

Early DV/ACL engine valves are mechanically shimmed; later versions were hydraulically auto-adjusted. The ACL had bigger injectors and the addition of the intercooler. The main block and bottom end remained identical. The head/valve adjusters/injectors/intake manifold and the turbo had variants plus a different sump for the oil to be pumped to the turbo.

Petrol
| Model | Cylinders | Size | Injection Type | Power | Torque | Engine Code / Years |
| 2.0 | I4 | 1,984 cc | carbureted | 52 kW (71 PS; 70 bhp) @ 4,300 rpm | 132 N⋅m (97 lbf⋅ft) @ 2,400 | CL: 05/76-11/82 |
| 2.0 | I4 | 1,984 cc | carbureted | 55 kW (75 PS; 74 bhp) @ 4,300 rpm | 152 N⋅m (112 lbf⋅ft) @ 2,400 | CH: 04/75-11/82 |
| 2.4 | I6 | 2,383 cc | carbureted | 66 kW (90 PS; 89 bhp) | – | DL: 08/82-07/92 |
| 2.4 | I6 | 2,383 cc | fuel-injected | 69 kW (94 PS; 93 bhp) | – | 1E: 08/88-12/95 |
Diesel
| Model | Cylinders | Size | Injection Type | Power | Torque | Engine Code / Years |
| 2.7 Perkins | I4 | 2,702 cc | indirect | 48 kW (65 PS; 64 bhp) | – | CG: 01/76-11/82 |
| 2.4 D24 | I6 | 2,383 cc | indirect | 55 kW (75 PS; 74 bhp) @ 4,000 rpm | 155 N⋅m (114 lbf⋅ft) @ 2,800 rpm | CP: 08/78-11/82, DW: 12/82-07/92 |
| 2.4 D24 | I6 | 2,383 cc | indirect | 51 kW (69 PS; 68 bhp) @ 3,400 rpm | 145 N⋅m (107 lbf⋅ft) @ 1,600–1,800 rpm | 1S: 08/88-07/92, ACT: 08/92-12/95 |
| 2.4 D24T | I6 | 2,383 cc | indirect, turbo-charged | 68 kW (92 PS; 91 bhp) | – | 1G: 08/88-07/92 |
| 2.4 D24T | I6 | 2,383 cc | indirect, turbo-charged | 75 kW (102 PS; 101 bhp) | 195 N⋅m (144 lbf⋅ft) | DV: 12/82-07/92 |
| 2.4 D24TIC | I6 | 2,383 cc | indirect, turbo-charged, intercooled | 70 kW (95 PS; 94 bhp) @ 4,000 rpm | 220 N⋅m (162 lbf⋅ft) | ACL: 08/91-12/95 |

=== Axles ===
Turbodiesel axles are reinforced, have the transition to the cardan shaft further ahead, or a shorter shaft. Axles for single tires cannot be installed in vehicles with twin tires and vice versa. LT 1 4x4 axles are completely different and cannot be replaced by other LT axles.

| Axle Ratio | | M code (until 1990) | PR code (from 1991) | comment |
|---|---|---|---|---|
| Quicker | | | | |
| 53: 14 | = 3.79 | 396 | 0ZH | |
| 53: 13 | = 4.08 | 355 | 0ZG | |
| 53: 13 | = 4.08 | 452 | ? | Single tires |
| 41: 10 | = 4.10 | 267 | 0ZF | |
| 40: 9 | = 4.44 | 378 | 0ZE | |
| 39: 8 | = 4.88 | 379 | 0ZD | |
| 43: 8 | = 5.38 | 092 | 0ZC | |
| 41: 7 | = 5.86 | 375 | 0ZB | |
| 45: 7 | = 6.43 | 382 | 0ZA | |
| Slower | | | | |

A full list of code letter explanations is available on the German VW LT wiki.

=== Production figures ===
| Year | Production figures | Model LT 28 Kombi | Model LT 28 D Kombi | Model LT 28-40 Transporter | Model LT 28-40 D Transporter | Model LT 45-55 Transporter | Model LT 45-55 D Transporter |
|---|---|---|---|---|---|---|---|
| 1975 | 6608 | 0 | 0 | 6608 | 0 | 0 | 0 |
| 1976 | 25570 | 670 | 64 | 15765 | 7071 | 0 | 0 |
| 1977 | 30639 | 2405 | 614 | 15344 | 12276 | 0 | 0 |
| 1978 | 30454 | 2961 | 970 | 16965 | 9488 | 64 | 6 |
| 1979 | 33370 | 1747 | 1301 | 14559 | 13367 | 314 | 2082 |
| 1980 | 34383 | 1963 | 1620 | 13518 | 15446 | 306 | 1530 |
| 1981 | 22911 | 579 | 1377 | 6041 | 13345 | 132 | 1437 |
| 1982 | 21236 | 457 | 1185 | 5409 | 12946 | 167 | 1072 |
| 1983 | 21633 | 352 | 1097 | 6083 | 11788 | 142 | 2171 |
| 1984 | 20980 | 397 | 1689 | 4896 | 11760 | 210 | 2028 |
| 1985 | 21714 | 293 | 1292 | 4187 | 13235 | 100 | 2607 |
| 1986 | 20825 | 210 | 1395 | 3665 | 13193 | 80 | 2282 |
| 1987 | 23221 | | | | | | |
| 1988 | 21756 | | | | | | |
| 1989 | 22338 | | | | | | |
| 1990 | 20849+2893 | → | 2893 | | | | |
| 1991 | 21289+3494 | → | 3494 | | | | |
| 1992 | 16030+1914 | → | 1914 | | | | |
| 1993 | 13077+1232 | → | 1232 | | | | |
| 1994 | 12909+1120 | → | 1120 | | | | |
| 1995 | 14439+1035 | → | 1035 | | | | |
| Sum | 467919 | | | | | | |

== 2nd generation LT (Typ 2D) ==
Volkswagen LT (2nd generation)
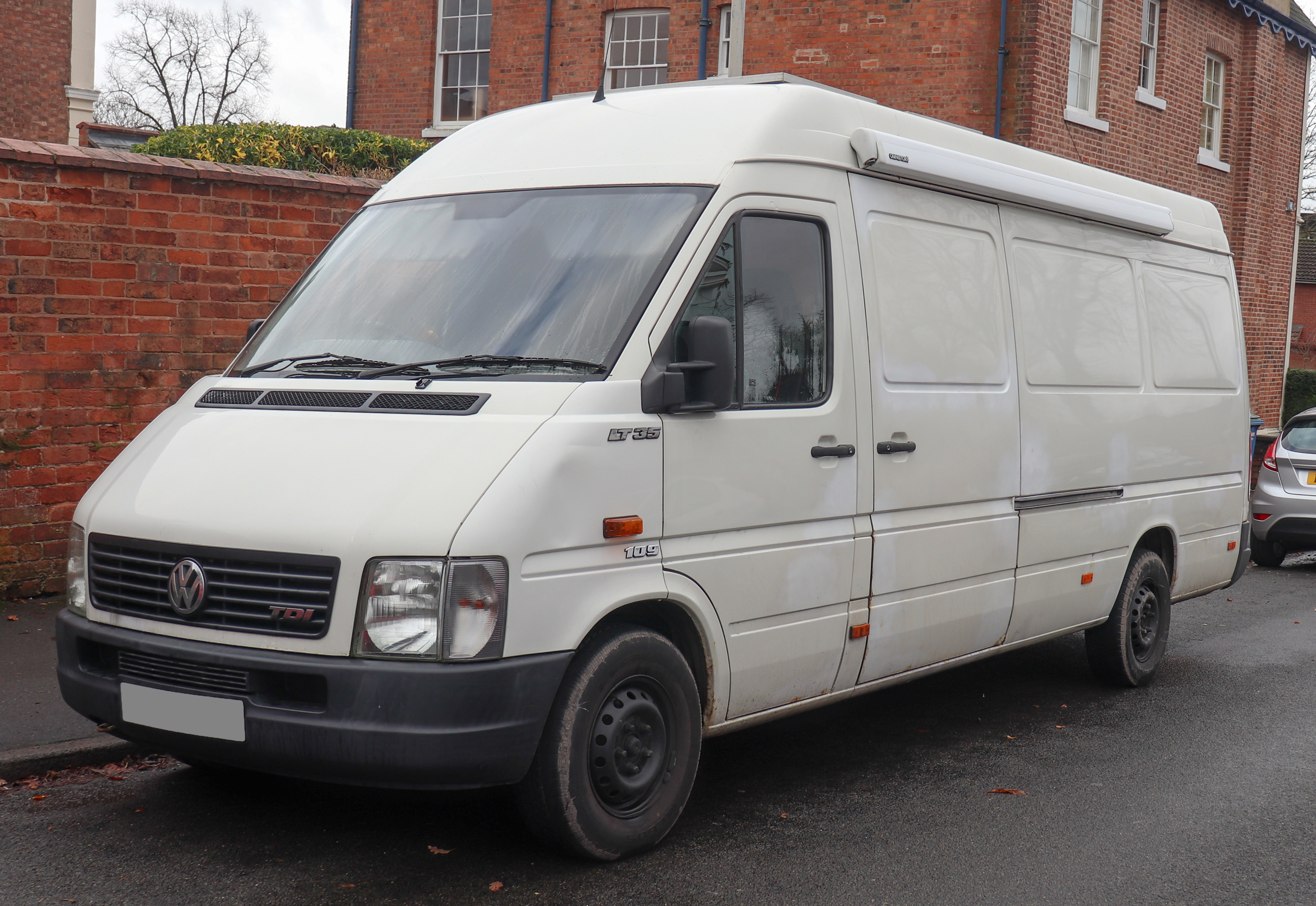

Overview
- Manufacturer: Volkswagen Commercial Vehicles
- Production: May 1996 – July 2006
- Assembly: Germany: Hanover

Body and chassis
- Related: Force Traveller T1N; Mercedes-Benz Sprinter

Dimensions
- Wheelbase: 3,000–4,025 mm (118.1–158.5 in)
- Length: 4,835–6,803 mm (190.4–267.8 in)
- Width: 1,922–2,151 mm (75.7–84.7 in)
- Height: 2,160–2,600 mm (85.0–102.4 in)

Chronology
- Successor: Volkswagen Crafter

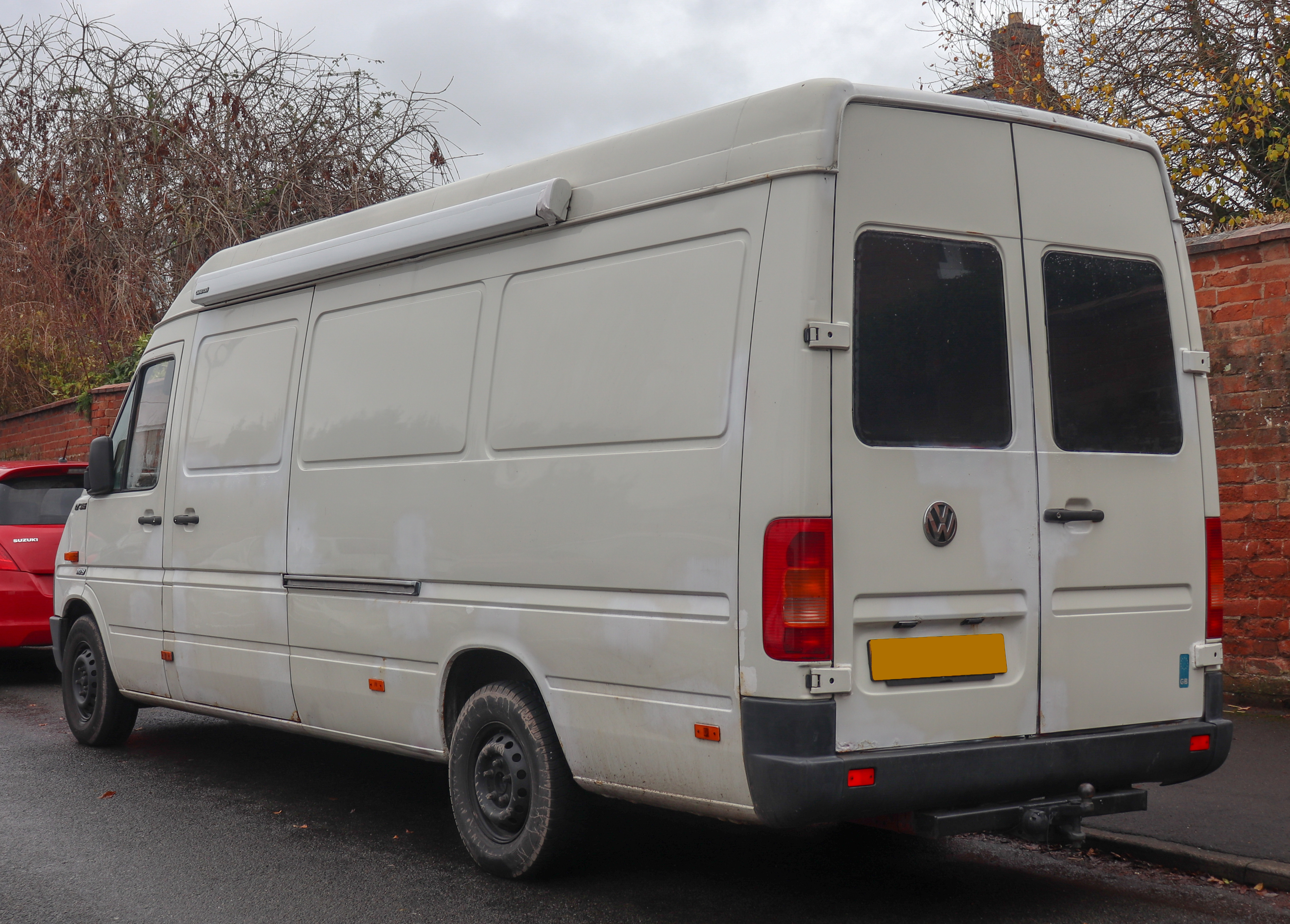
VW LT 35 TDI

=== History ===
In 1996, the joint venture of Volkswagen and Daimler's Mercedes-Benz Commercial introduced the second generation LT. The Volkswagen version shared the body shell with the new Mercedes-Benz Sprinter. The engine and transmission were Volkswagen Group sourced.

The new design incorporated an engine mounted longitudinally beneath a short hood and with rear-wheel drive. The LT adopted what had become the standard style of construction for bigger transporters. It also included economical direct-injection diesel engines, easy access to the driver cab behind the front axle, and a wide space between the driver and passenger seat.

The range now went from 2.6 to 4.6 tons gross vehicle weight, and the enclosed options of the panel van and compact were available in three wheelbase options. Platform vehicles, crew cabs, and numerous undercarriage options completed the range. A special articulated version of the second generation LT, the XLT was available through special order.

=== Typ codes ===
The Volkswagen "Typ codes" for the second generation LT are:

- Typ 35 — May 1996 to July 2006

=== Engines ===
Engines included a naturally aspirated engine, as well as three Turbocharged Direct Injection (TDI) diesel engines. These were the inline-five-cylinder TDI used in the Volkswagen Eurovan (Type 2 T4). The performance range for the LT initially went from 61 to 96 kW (83 to 131 PS; 82 to 129 bhp). In January 2002, an inline-four-cylinder 2.8 L engine made by MWM International Motores increased power output to 116 kilowatts (158 PS; 156 bhp), and the maximum torque to 331 N⋅m (244 lbf⋅ft).

The 2.8 L engine specifications:

- 2,799 cc (170.8 cu in) inline-four-cylinder, 93 mm bore, 103 mm stroke and three valves per cylinder
- rated output: 116 kW (158 PS; 156 bhp) EEC at 3500 rpm; 331 N⋅m (244 lbf⋅ft) at 1800 rpm
- Diesel common rail fuel system

The 2.5 L:

- 2,461 cc (150.2 cu in) inline-five-cylinder, 81 mm bore, 95.5 mm stroke, 19.5 compression ratio, and two valves per cylinder
- rated output: 80 kW (109 PS; 107 bhp) EEC at 3500 rpm; 280 N⋅m (207 lbf⋅ft) at 1900 rpm
- Diesel direct injection fuel system (Bosch VP37 belt-driven pump with two-stage nozzles)
- KK&K K14 turbocharger

Petrol
| Model | Cylinders | Size | Valves | Power | Torque | Engine Code / Years |
| 2.3 | I4 | 2,295 cc | 16v | 105 kW (143 PS; 141 bhp) @ 5,000 rpm | 210 N⋅m (155 lbf⋅ft) @ 4,000 | AGL: 05/96-11/01 |
Diesel
| Model | Cylinders | Size | Valves | Power | Torque | Engine Code / Years |
| 2.5 SDI | I5 | 2,461 cc | 10v | 55 kW (75 PS; 74 bhp) @ 3,800 rpm | 160 N⋅m (118 lbf⋅ft) @ 2,000–2,400 rpm | AGX: 05/96-04/01 |
| 2.5 TDI | I5 | 2,461 cc | 10v | 61 kW (83 PS; 82 bhp) @ 3,500 rpm | 200 N⋅m (148 lbf⋅ft) @ 1,500–2,500 rpm | BBE: 05/01-07/06 |
| 2.5 TDI | I5 | 2,461 cc | 10v | 66 kW (90 PS; 89 bhp) @ 3,500 rpm | 220 N⋅m (162 lbf⋅ft) @ 1,800 rpm | APA: 05/99-04/01 |
| 2.5 TDI | I5 | 2,461 cc | 10v | 70 kW (95 PS; 94 bhp) @ 3,500 rpm | 240 N⋅m (177 lbf⋅ft) @ 2,200–2,500 rpm | BBF: 05/01-07/06 |
| 2.5 TDI | I5 | 2,461 cc | 10v | 75 kW (102 PS; 101 bhp) @ 3,500 rpm | 250 N⋅m (184 lbf⋅ft) @ 1,900–2,300 rpm | AHD: 05/96-05/99 |
| 2.5 TDI | I5 | 2,461 cc | 10v | 80 kW (110 PS; 110 bhp) @ 3,500 rpm | 280 N⋅m (207 lbf⋅ft) @ 1,900–2,500 rpm | ANJ/AVR: 06/99-07/06 |
| 2.8 TDI | I4 | 2,799 cc | 12v | 92 kW (125 PS; 123 bhp) @ 3,500 rpm | 280 N⋅m (207 lbf⋅ft) @ 2,300 rpm | AGK: 07/97-12/98 |
| 2.8 TDI | I4 | 2,799 cc | 12v | 96 kW (131 PS; 129 bhp) @ 3,500 rpm | 300 N⋅m (221 lbf⋅ft) @ 2,000–2,500 rpm | ATA: 01/99-01/02 |
| 2.8 TDI CR | I4 | 2,799 cc | 12v | 116 kW (158 PS; 156 bhp) @ 3,500 rpm | 331 N⋅m (244 lbf⋅ft) @ 1,800 rpm | AUH/BCQ: 02/02-07/06 |

=== Replacement ===
Production ended in September 2006, with about 350,000 LT models produced over nine years. Plans for the third generation of the 'large transporter' from Volkswagen Commercial Vehicles were canceled and later that year, the Volkswagen Crafter was launched.
