= Volvo 900 Series =

Range of executive car made by Volvo Cars

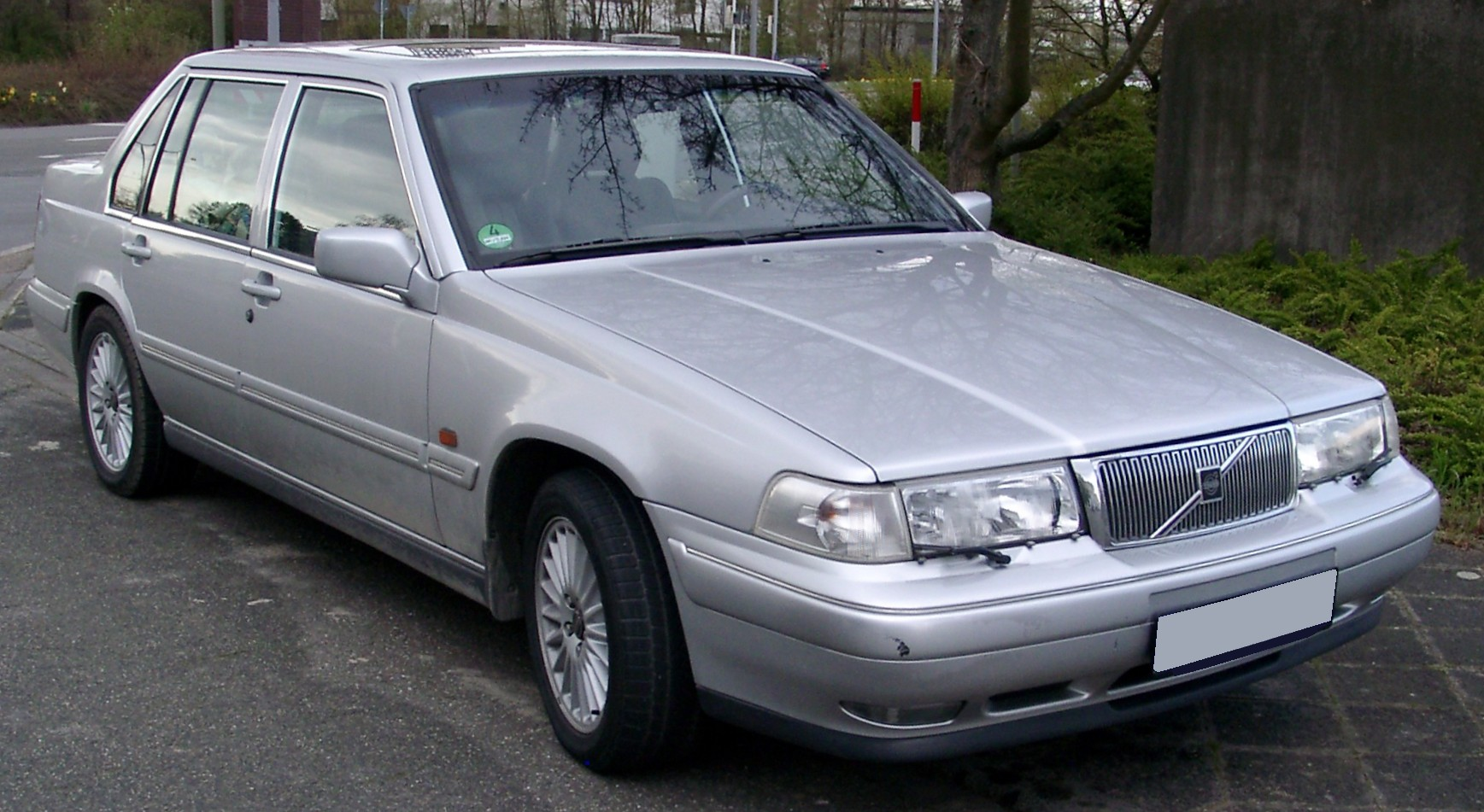

Overview
- Manufacturer: Volvo Cars
- Production: 1990–1998; 632,710 produced
- Designer: Rolf Malmgren, Håkan Malmgren

Body and chassis
- Class: Mid-size luxury / Executive car (E)
- Layout: Longitudinal FR layout
- Platform: P90

Chronology
- Predecessor: Volvo 700 Series
- Successor: Volvo V70 III (Estate); Volvo S80 (Saloon); Volvo S80L (Executive Royal)

The Volvo 900 Series is a range of executive cars produced by the Swedish manufacturer Volvo Cars from 1990 to 1998. The 900 Series was introduced in 1990 to replace the 700 Series from which it derived. Prior to the end of its production, the 960 was renamed as the Volvo S90 (saloon) and Volvo V90 (estate), and the 940 was renamed 940 Classic, becoming the last rear-wheel-drive cars from Volvo, until the 2023 Volvo XC40 Recharge Pure Electric.

Visible differences between the 700 and the 900 Series included redesigned rear styling of the saloon models (late 700 estates and early 900 estates are visually identical). The 960 was introduced in 1991 along with a new family of modular engines, and then was substantially revised for the 1995 model year, improving the handling. The range was augmented by the new Volvo 850 in 1991. The last of the 900s was sold in 1998. Some 900 Series were built as chassis for ambulances and hearses after the main production run had been completed.

== Volvo 940 ==
Volvo 940
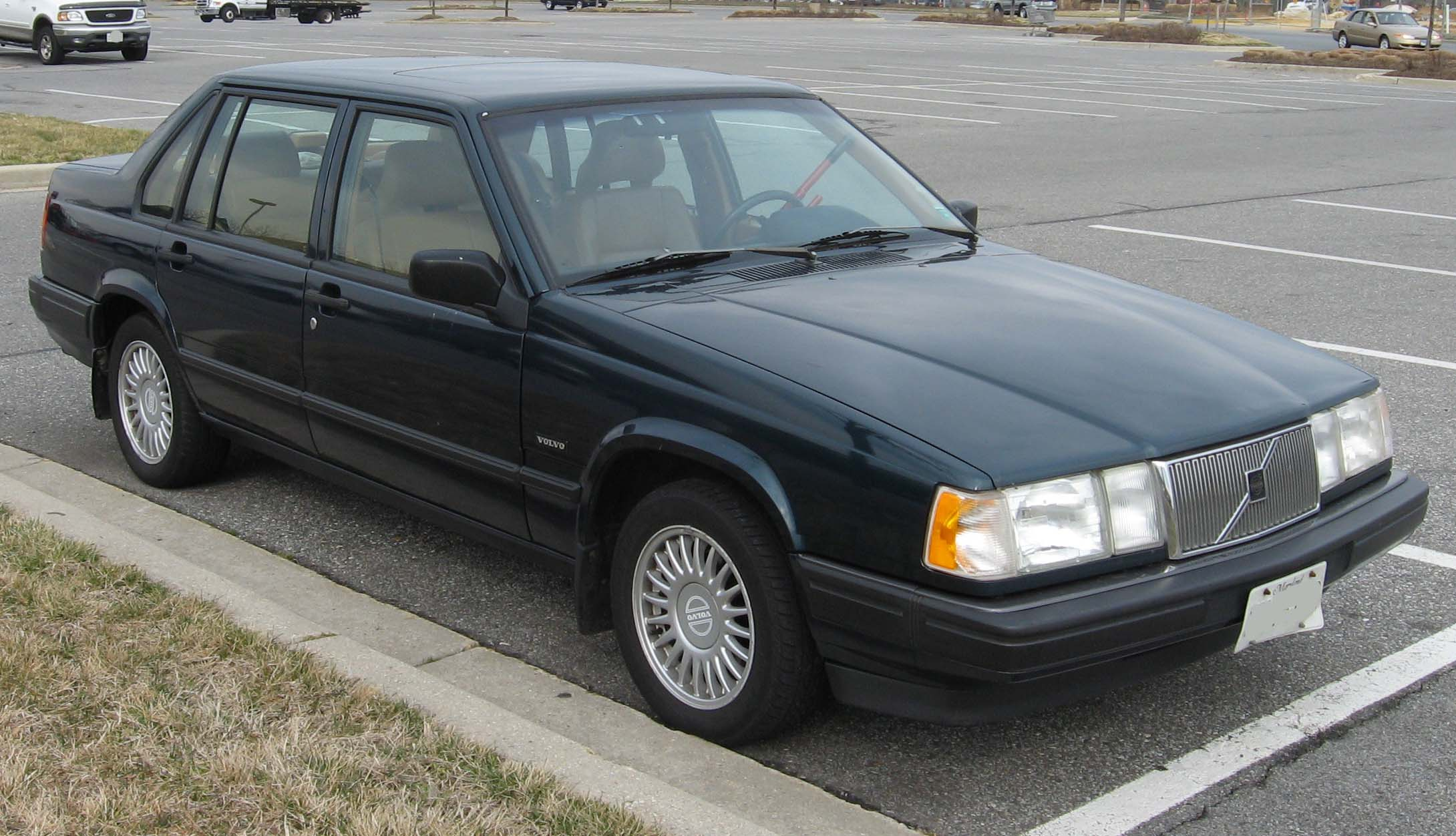

Overview
- Manufacturer: Volvo Cars
- Production: September 1990–February 1998
- Assembly: Sweden: Kalmar (VKA); Torslanda (Torslandaverken) Uddevalla (Uddevallaverken); Belgium: Ghent; Canada: Halifax (VHA); Thailand: Samutprakarn (TSA); Indonesia

Body and chassis
- Body style: 4-door saloon; 5-door estate
- Layout: FR layout

Powertrain
- Engine: 2.0 L B200E/F/K I4; 2.0 L B204E/F DOHC I4; 2.0 L B200ET/FT turbo I4; 2.0 L B204FT/GT turbo DOHC I4; 2.3 L B230E/F I4; 2.3 L B234F DOHC I4; 2.3 L B230ET/FK/FT turbo I4; 2.4 L Volkswagen D24 diesel I6; 2.4 L Volkswagen D24T/TIC TD I6
- Transmission: 4-speed automatic; 4-speed w/electric overdrive manual; 5-speed manual

Dimensions
- Wheelbase: 2,770 mm (109.1 in)
- Length: 4,869 mm (191.7 in)
- Width: 1,760 mm (69.3 in)
- Height: saloon: 1,410 mm (55.5 in); estate: 1,435 mm (56.5 in)
- Curb weight: saloon: 1,445–1,485 kg (3,186–3,274 lb); estate: 1,481–1,520 kg (3,265–3,351 lb)

Introduced in September 1990, the 940 was essentially a cosmetic reskin of the 740 aside from the completely redesigned rear from the C pillar back on the saloon. The new, taller boot did diminish rearward vision but provided a larger opening to a larger boot than on the 700-series. The dashboard and seats were all new, offering a bit more headroom and the option of an integrated child booster seat in the rear. All drivetrains, and most options available in the 940 had been available in the 740, with the exception of the 780 Coupé. The 940 was more closely related to the 740 than the 760, sharing similar drivetrain choices and sheet metal from the A-pillar forward. In contrast, the 960 was an evolution of the 760. The 760 / 960 front sheet metal, independent rear suspension, dashboard, and other interior features were all exclusive to the two upscale models. The 940 estate, introduced in May 1991, was almost identical to its 740 estate predecessor.

The engines options were carried over from the 740, with 8-valve 2-litre (B200) and 2.3-litre (B230) four cylinder petrol engines, either naturally aspirated or turbocharged, as well as the familiar 2.4-litre Volkswagen six-cylinder diesel and turbodiesels being fitted. There were also 16-valve versions of the petrol engines fitted on some 1991 and 1992 models (B204, B234, naturally aspirated). The 2-litre 16-valve engine was fitted to the 940 base model in Italy at the time of introduction, to mark it being a step up from the 740. After the 740 was discontinued, the eight-valve engine found its way into the 940 as well. The 2.3-litre turbocharged version produces 165 PS (121 kW); Volvo sold a chip tuning kit called Turbo+ which boosted the power to 190 PS (140 kW).

In 1994, petrol engine range was limited to 2.3 engines in Britain, but the 2.0-litre engines remained available in markets with tight tax limits, such as Italy, Belgium, and Portugal. A low-pressure turbocharged version of the B230, the B230FK, debuted in 1994 – maximum power was only up slightly over the B230FB, from 131 to 135 PS (96 to 99 kW), but torque increased throughout the range and there was virtually no turbo lag due to the small size of the charger. The 155 PS (114 kW) turbocharged 2.0 was first presented in February 1991. Originally intended for Italy and other markets with significant taxation thresholds at two litres, it was later also installed in the British-market 940 SE. The most commonly found engines on 940s were the naturally aspirated B230FB with 131 PS (96 kW) (all markets but US), B230FD with 115 PS (85 kW) (mainly for the US market), the turbocharged B230FK and FT, and the D24TIC diesel engine with 116 PS (85 kW). The share of sales for the turbodiesel were much lower for the 900-series than in earlier years.

Engines were fitted with either a 5-speed (M47) or 4-speed+overdrive (M46) manual gearbox or an automatic transmission, either Aisin-Warner AW70/71/72 (3-speed+overdrive) or ZF 4HP22 (4-speed) for some B230FB (or E) and diesel engines. In 1995, the manual gearbox was replaced with a full 5-speed (M90), and the ZF was abandoned for petrol engines and fitted only on diesels.

The SE emblem denoted very different trim and engine levels in different countries. In Sweden, the 940 SE was an ordinary non-turbo 940 with some optional extras as standard, most notably painted mirrors and bumpers. In the UK it was a high trim level available with all engines (from 2.0 to 2.3 turbo). In Australia, the 940 SE was a high trim level with only the 2.3 Turbo B230FT with some extras as standard and featured, rather unusually, full painted bumpers. In Thailand the 940 SE was a Turbo (LPT) model with leather seats, ABS brakes and SRS Airbag. In the US, the 940 SE utilised the body from the 960 (different dashboard, firewall, bonnet, recessed windscreen wipers etc.) with the four-cylinder B230FT engine, the 940 SE badge presumably chosen by Volvo in order to maintain the link between name and number of cylinders.

From MY 1993 on, in Italy all 940 estates were badged "Polar" (engine B200F) or "Super Polar" (engine B200FT). Towards the end of the model cycle, certain countries (as Sweden, Germany and Switzerland) received a well equipped, limited series badged "Classic". Production of the 940 series extended from 1990 to 1998 with a total of 246,704 units of saloon and 231,677 units of estate. The Volvo 940 is among the last in the long-running line of rear-wheel drive cars from Volvo.

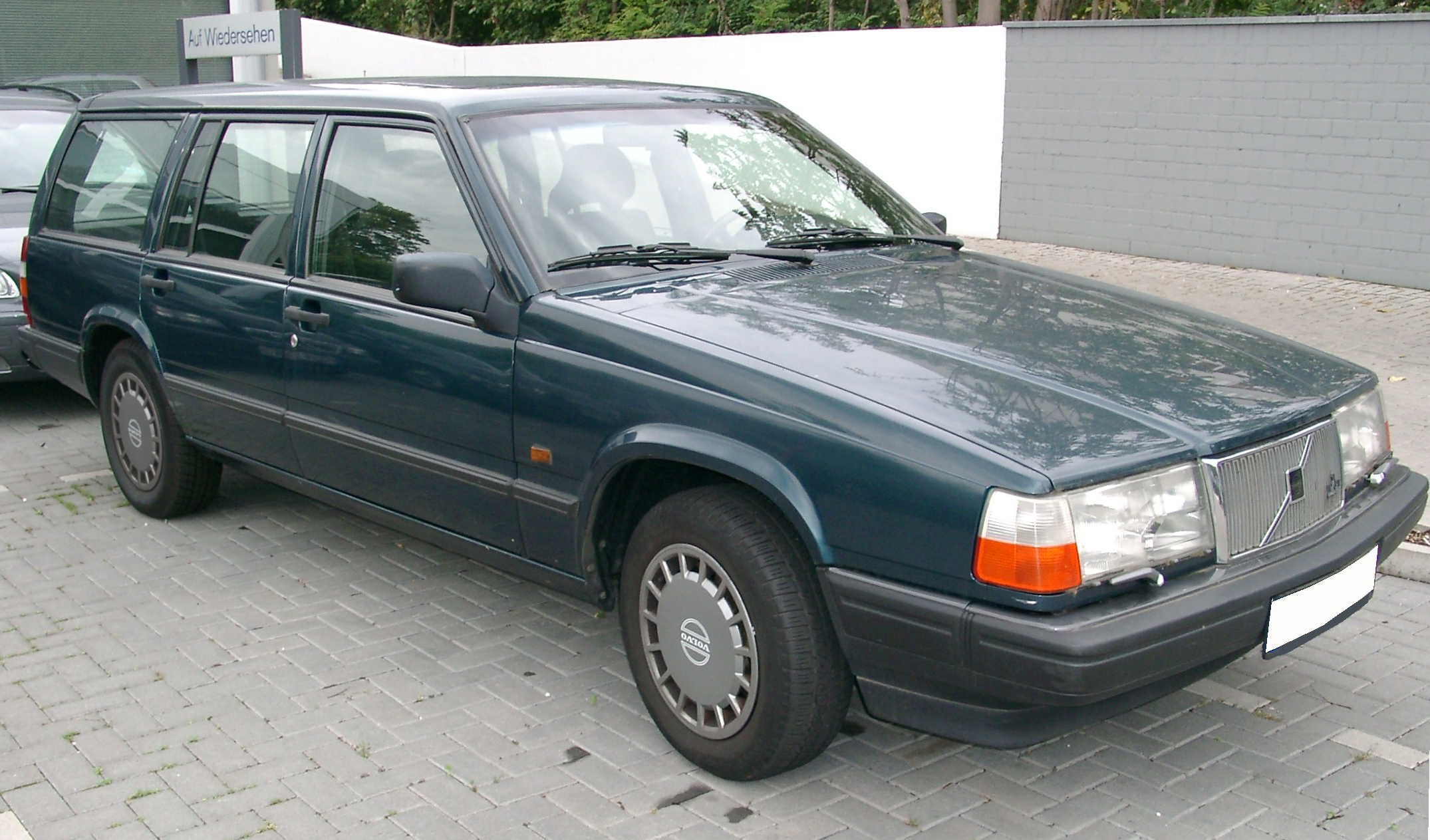
Volvo 940; European spec. front

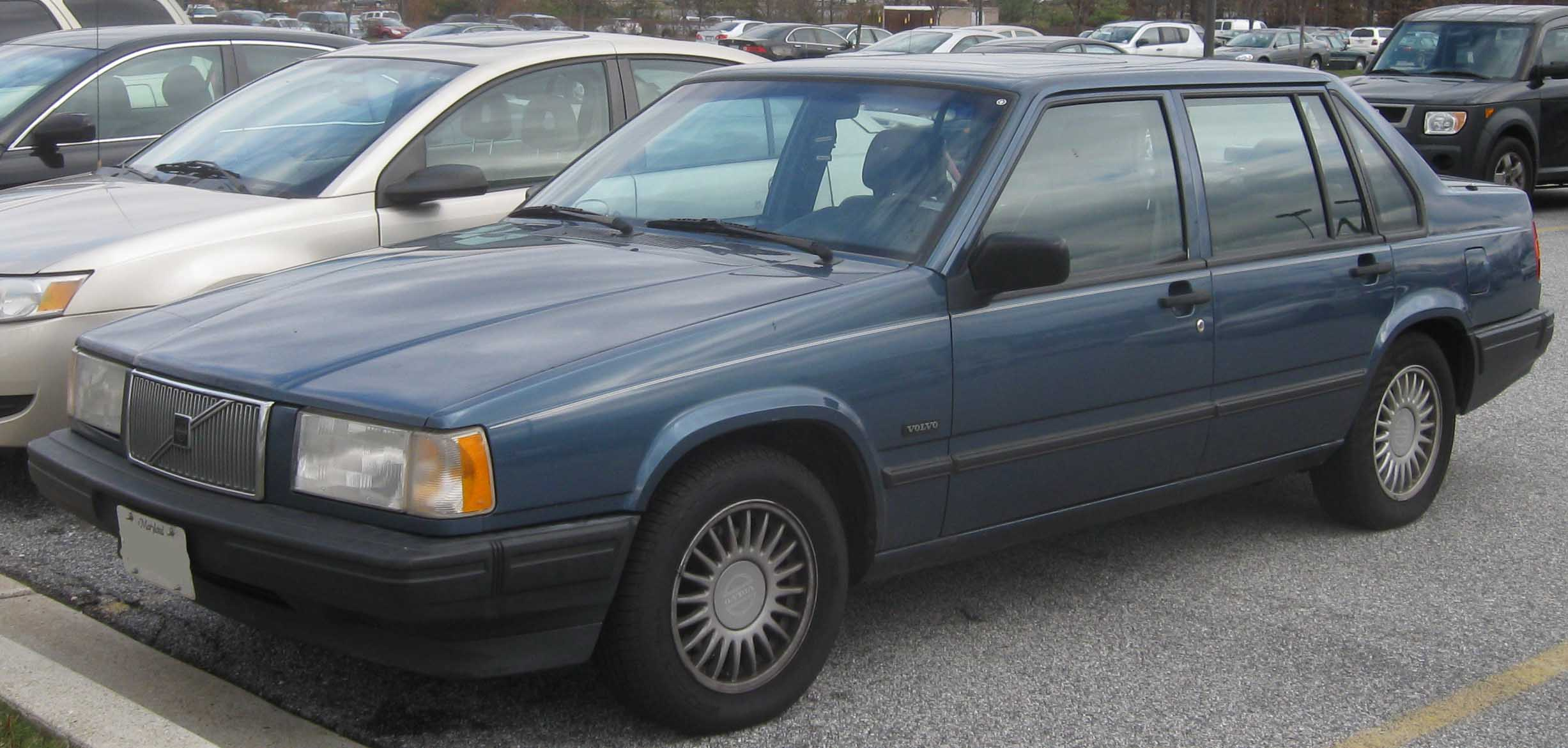
Volvo 940; US spec. front

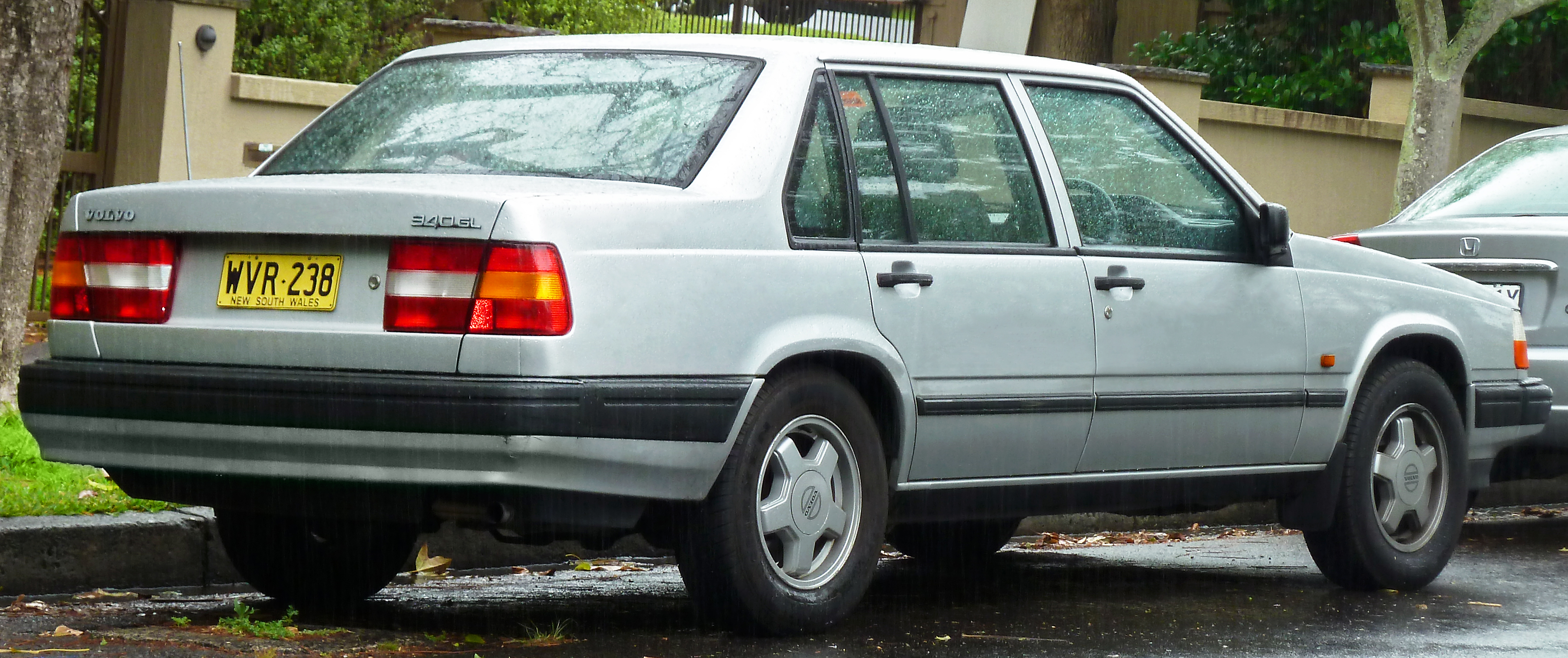
Volvo 940 saloon - rear

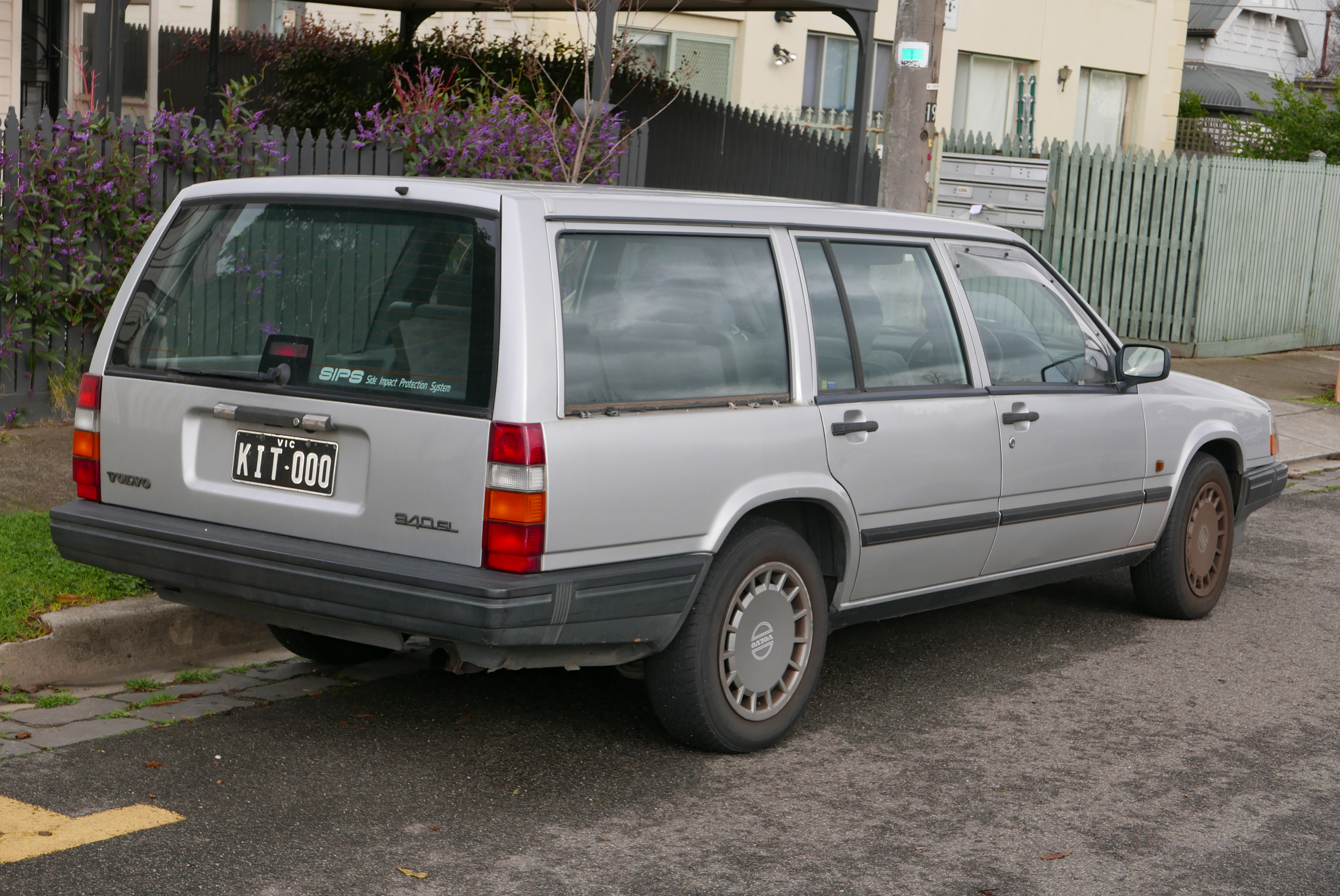
Volvo 940 Estate - rear

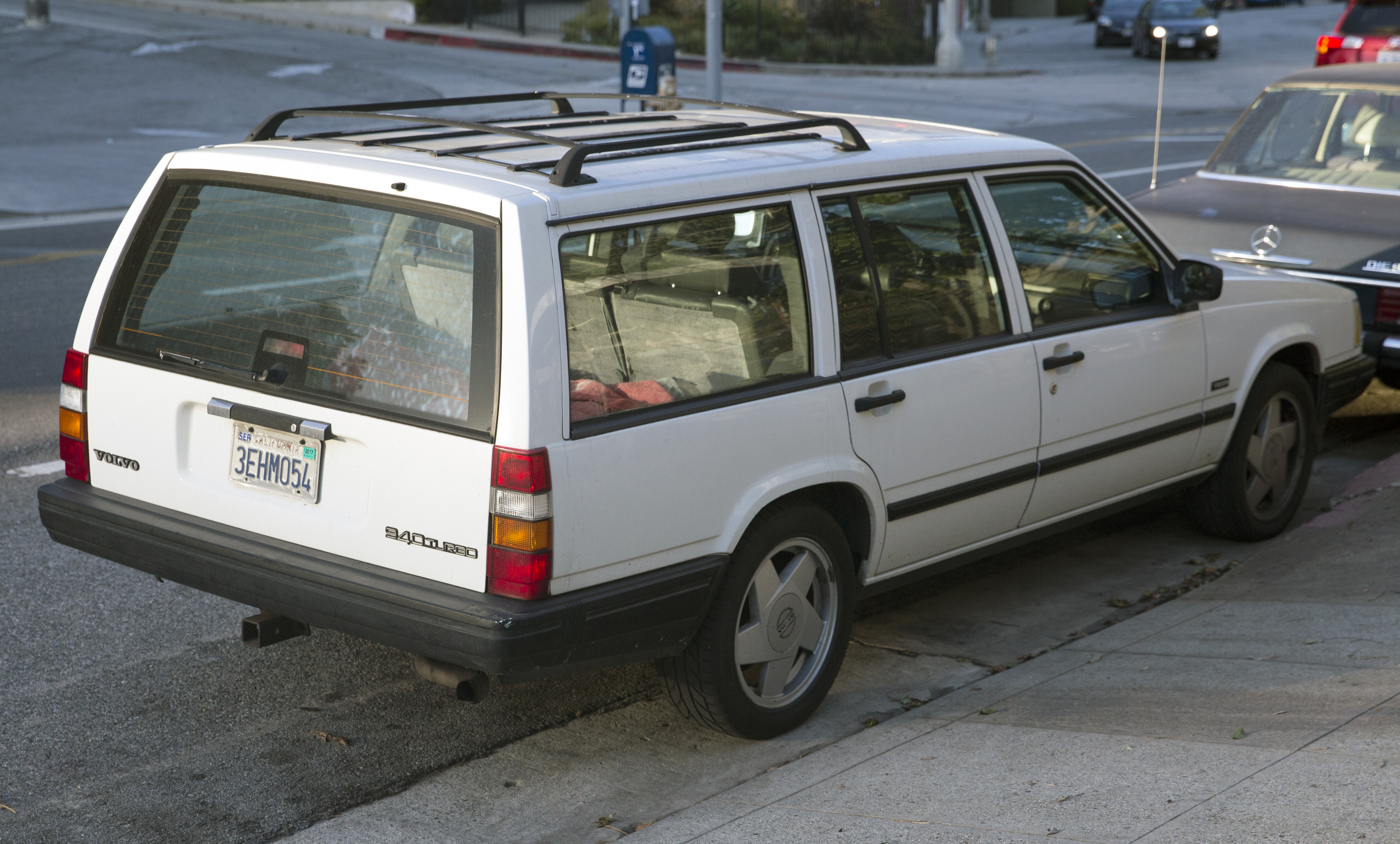
Volvo 940 Turbo wagon (US)

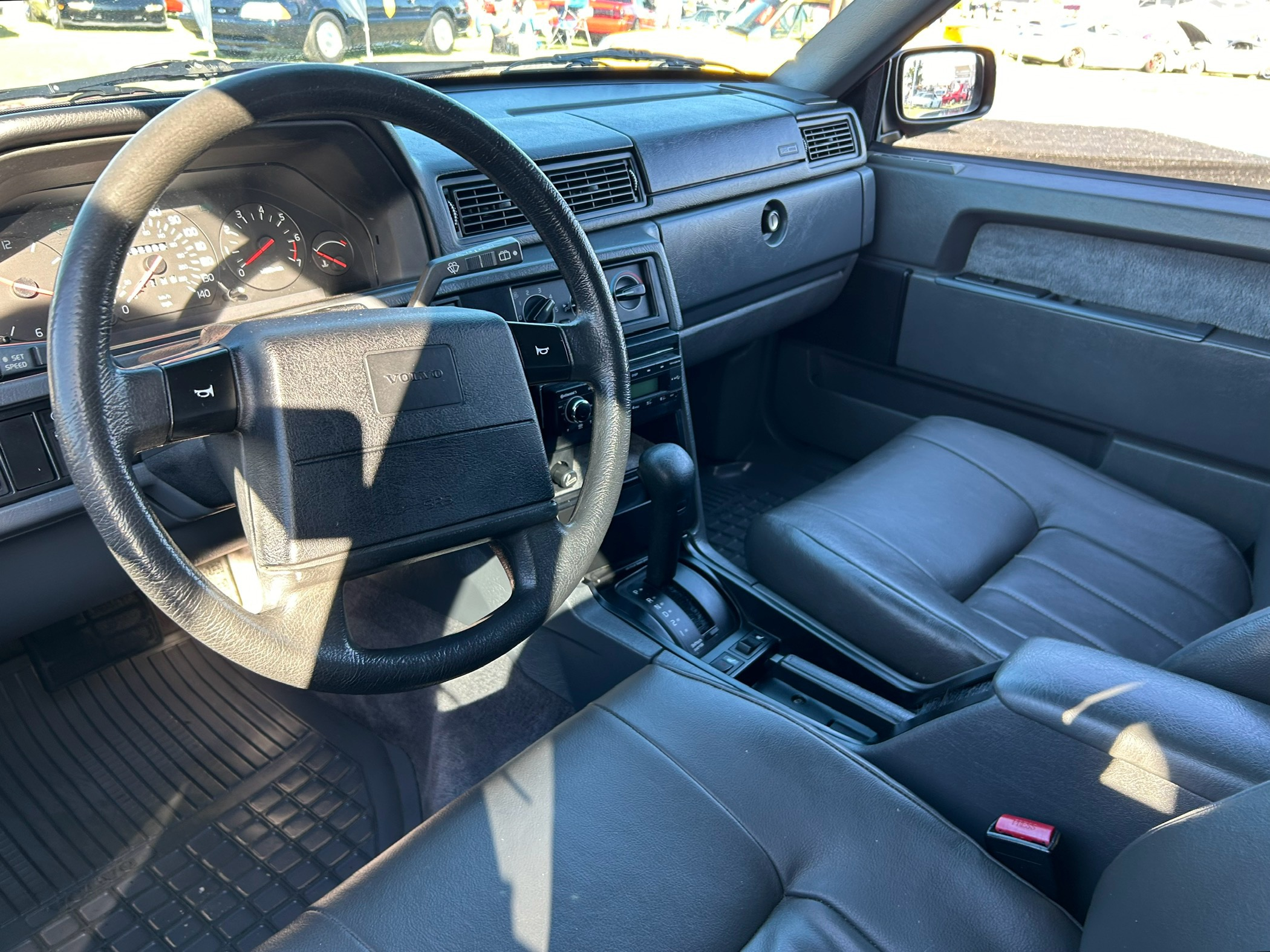
Volvo 940 Estate interior

=== North America ===
In the United States, the 1991 940 was offered in three versions: the 940 GLE used a DOHC 16-valve version of the 2.3-litre engine (B234) with a 6000 rpm redline. The 940 Turbo used a turbocharged 2.3-litre engine (B230FT), and the top-end 940 SE (also turbocharged) included body-coloured trim, and various premium features (leather, power seats/moonroof, etc.) as standard equipment.

This is one of the Volvo vehicles that was produced at Volvo's former manufacturing facility in Halifax, Nova Scotia. In 1993, 940s built at that plant were affixed with roundels at the rear window, to celebrate the plant's 30th anniversary.

For the 1992 model year the 940 GLE was downgraded with a 114 hp (85 kW) version of the 2.3-litre four-cylinder engine and sold as the 940 GL. The 940 SE was in actuality a 960 Turbo sold as the 940 SE, while the 940 Turbo remained largely unchanged. US-sales ended in 1995 in favour of the Volvo 850 and Volvo 960 series.

== Volvo 960 ==
Volvo 960
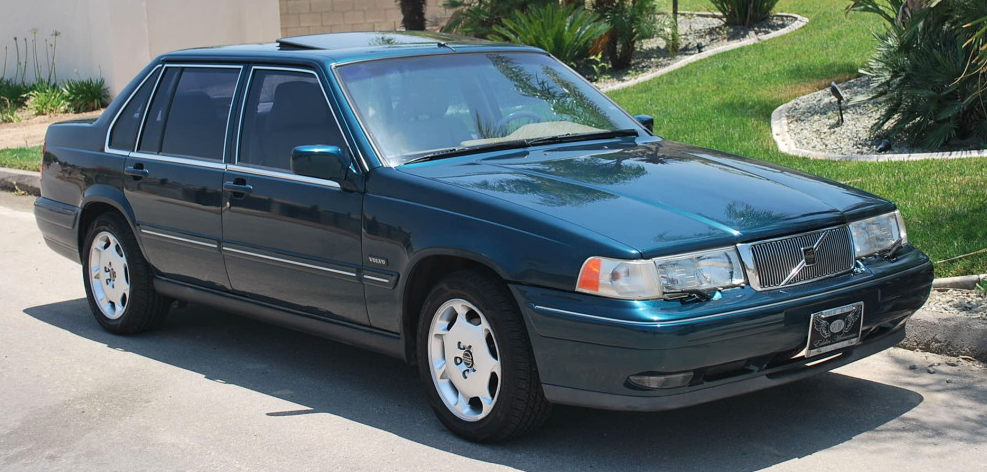

Overview
- Manufacturer: Volvo Cars
- Also called: Volvo S90; Volvo V90
- Production: 1990–1998
- Assembly: Sweden: Kalmar (VKA); Sweden: Gothenburg

Body and chassis
- Body style: 4-door saloon; 5-door estate
- Layout: FR layout

Powertrain
- Engine: petrol: 2.0 L B204E/F 16V I4; 2.0 L B204FT/GT 16V turbo I4; 2.3 L B230FT turbo I4; 2.5 L B6244/6254 I6; 2.8 L PRV B280E/F V6; 2.9 L B6304 I6; diesel: 2.4 L Volkswagen D24TIC td I6
- Transmission: 4-speed Aisin AW30-43 automatic; 5-speed Volvo M90 manual

Dimensions
- Wheelbase: 2,771 mm (109.1 in); 2,921 mm (115 in) (960 Executive/S90 Royal LWB)
- Length: saloon (960 Executive/S90 Royal LWB): 5,020 mm (197.6 in); 1992–1994 saloon: 4,869 mm (191.7 in); 1992–1994 estate: 4,808 mm (189.3 in); 1995–1998 saloon: 4,872 mm (191.8 in); 1995–1998 estate: 4,862 mm (191.4 in)
- Width: 1995–1997 saloon: 1,750 mm (68.9 in); 1,760 mm (69.3 in)
- Height: 1992–1994 saloon: 1,410 mm (55.5 in); 1992–1994 estate: 1,435 mm (56.5 in); 1995–1998 saloon: 1,438 mm (56.6 in); 1995–1998 estate: 1,463 mm (57.6 in)
- Curb weight: saloon: 1,560–1,604 kg (3,439–3,536 lb); estate: 1,602–1,629 kg (3,532–3,591 lb)

=== 1990–1994 ===
The Autumn of 1990 marked the launch of the Volvo 960 in time for the 1991 model year. This was the replacement for the 760. The 1991 960 was an evolutionary progression of the 1990 760, but it was also one of the first cars to feature the work of British designer Peter Horbury.

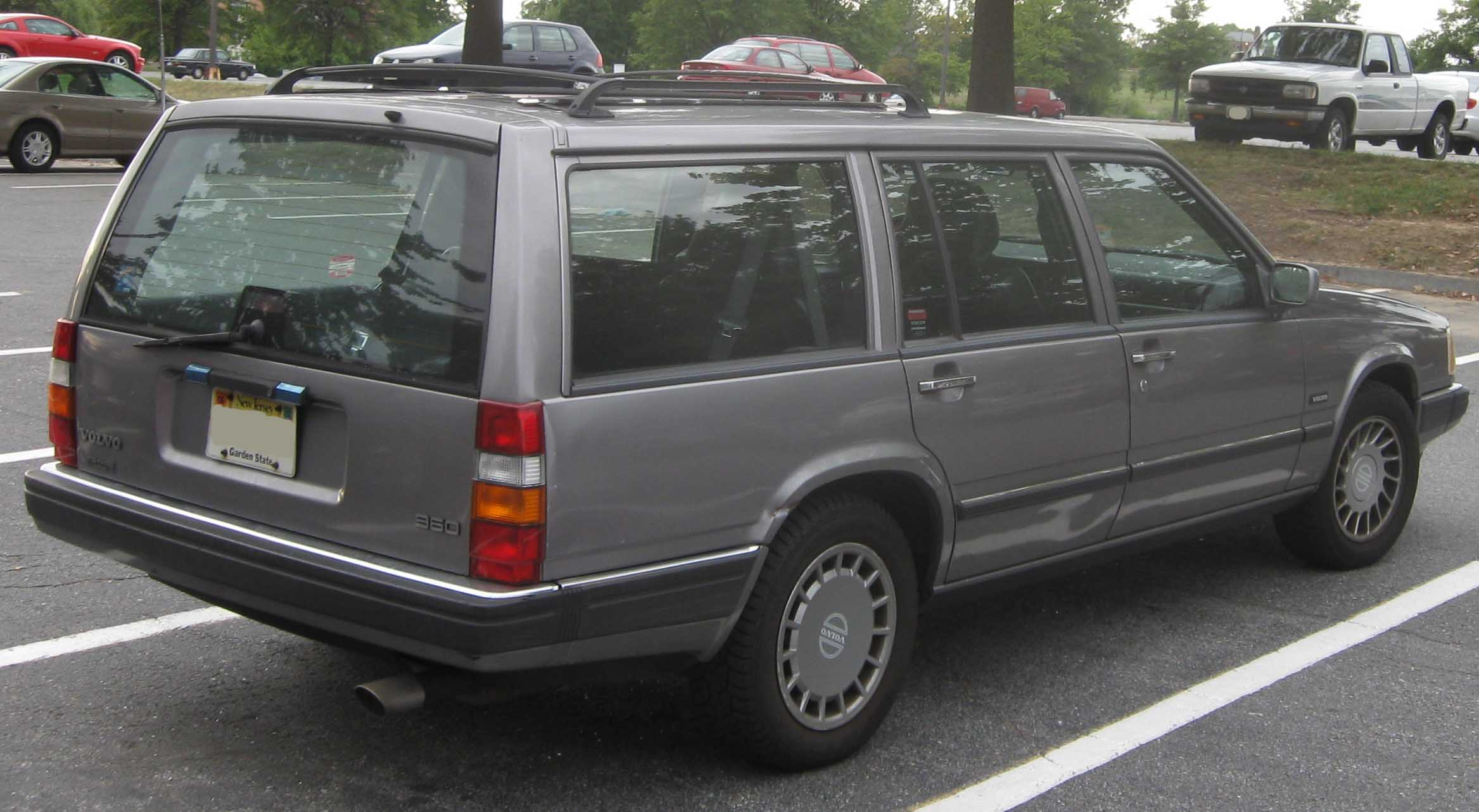
Volvo 960 estate - rear (US)

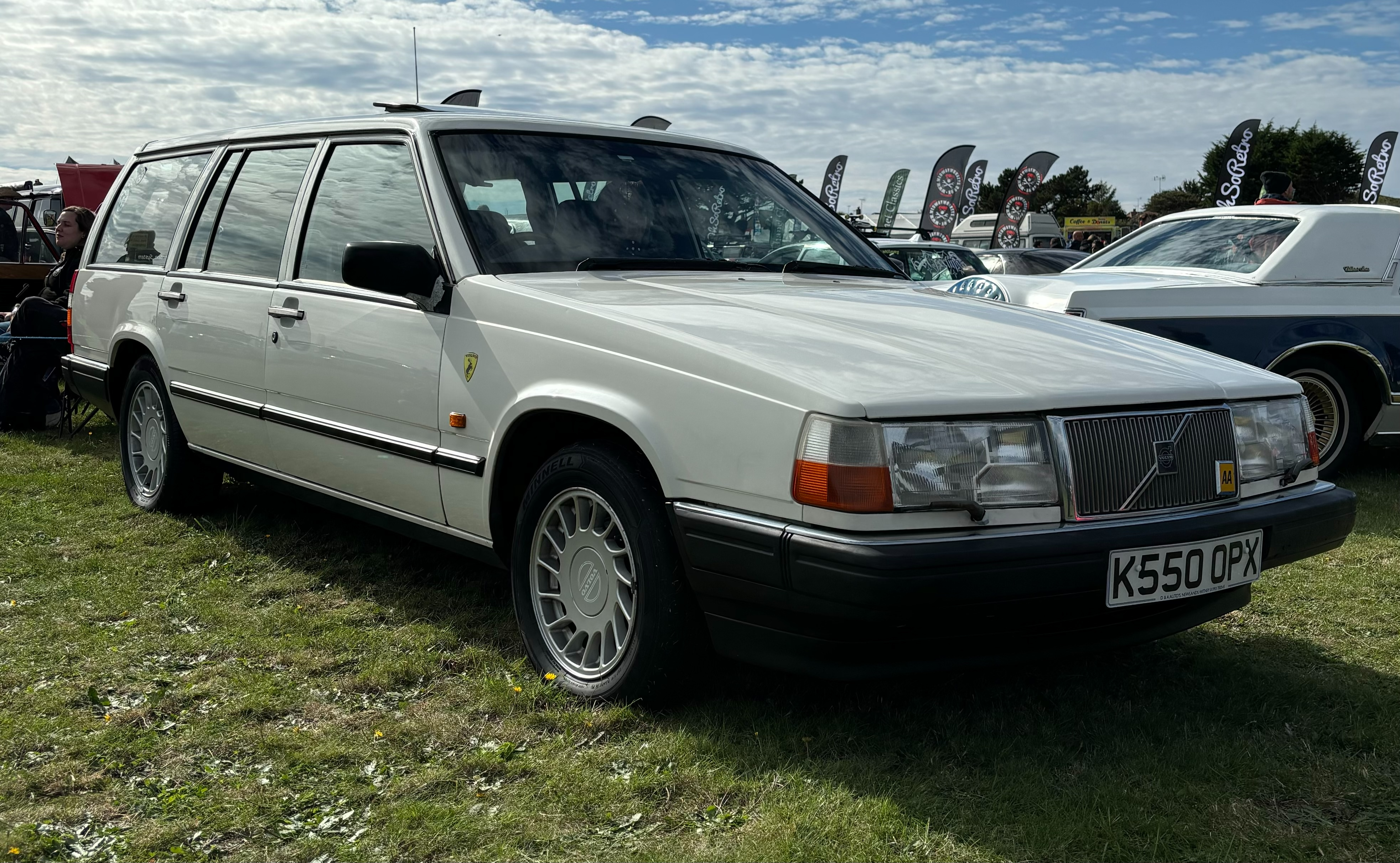
Volvo 960 estate - front (UK)

The most significant change was that, in most markets, the 960 was offered with an all-new aluminium 24-valve DOHC inline six-cylinder engine, often referred to as "white block" in the Volvo community due to its bare aluminium block. Maximum power was 204 PS (150 kW) at 6,000 rpm. Some markets, such as Australia and Japan, saw 1991 960s equipped with the same B280E/F V6 engine (145 PS or 107 kW at 5,100 rpm) that had powered the 1990 760. The 1992 model year saw the U.S. introduction of the DOHC inline six-cylinder engine. For the Italian and Portuguese markets, the 960 was available with the 16v 2-litre turbo (190/200 PS, 140/147 kW) from September 1990 until September 1993 along with the inline sixes. Certain markets also received the 2.3-litre turbo 'Redblock' four with 165 PS (121 kW), and the Volkswagen built D24TIC with 116 or 122 PS (85 or 90 kW).

The 960 received incremental changes for the 1992, 1993, and 1994 model years. Most visible were the new more shapely seats, and redesigned seat-belts with hydraulic pretensioners for 1992. 1993 saw a new more ergonomic shifter, and in 1994 dual front airbags were introduced in some markets. The opaque sunroof was replaced by a sliding sunshade and glass window. In 1994, the US version of the 3-litre six was tuned for more torque and a less peaky power delivery in favor of U.S. emissions regulations, with 181 PS (133 kW) at 5,200 rpm and 270 N⋅m (199 lb⋅ft) at 4,100 rpm (as opposed to 267 N⋅m or 197 lb⋅ft at 4,300 rpm for the rest of the world).

Nilsson, a small coachbuilder in Laholm, Sweden, worked under contract with Volvo to supply the stretched 960 Executive (and the later Royal model, with Hermès leather interior). Nilsson offered a number of different lengths and sealed the window in the C-pillar for more privacy in the rear. The Executive had about 15cm longer rear doors, longer versions had inserts behind the B-pillar. When looking underneath the interior panels and body in the backseat area you will find that everything from brakelines, exhaust, doors, floor, roof, doorcards, floormat and electronics has been cut in a straight line and extended.

For North America, the 1992–1994 Volvo 960s were built in Kalmar, Sweden. The very first Volvo 960 for the US-market rolled off the assembly line on August 12, 1991 as a 1992 model. The 1995 to 1998 960s were built in Gothenburg, Sweden. The first 1995 model year (facelift) 960 was built on June 27, 1994.

=== 1994–1998 ===
In 1994 (for the 1995 model year) the 960 received a facelift, including changes to the grille and body-coloured panels. A smaller 2.5 version of the six-cylinder (2,473 cc) was also added to the lineup, with 170 or 163 PS (125 or 120 kW) for the B6244FS version. The new 960 was the first car offered with standard daytime running lights in North America.

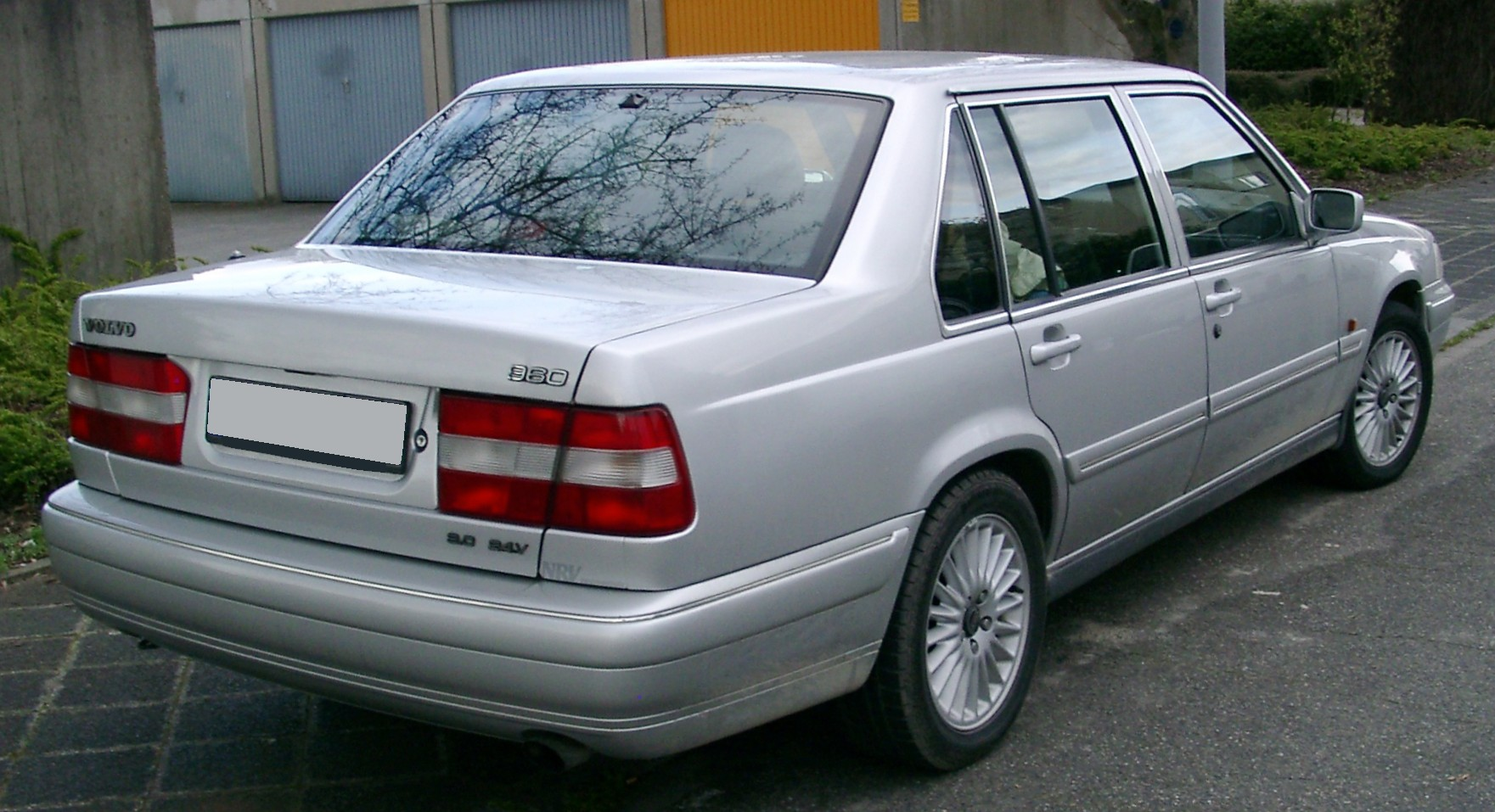
Volvo 960 saloon

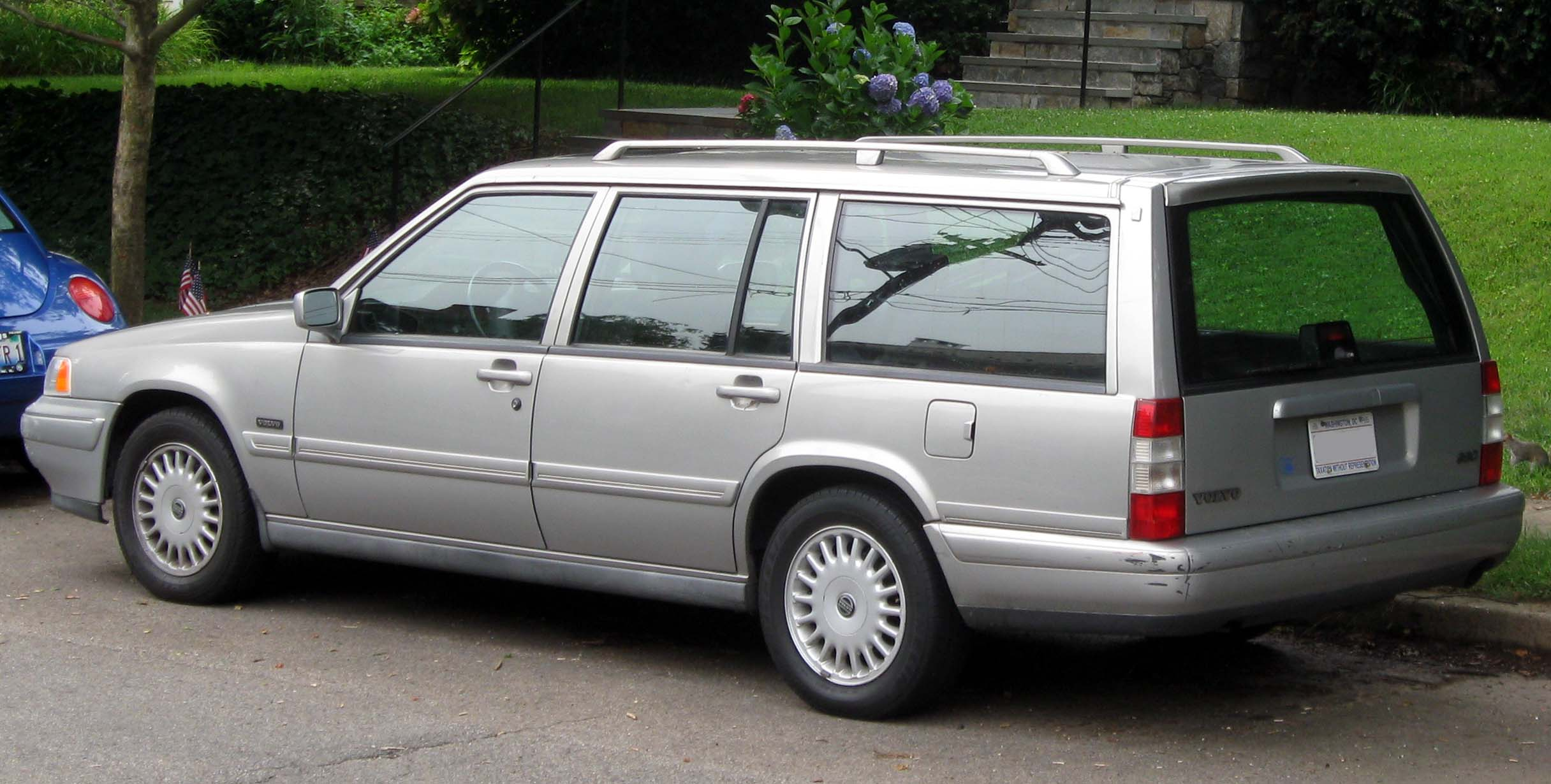
Volvo 960 estate (US)

Only the modular six-cylinder engines were available from model year 1995 on. The front suspension was redesigned to more closely match that of the 850. The rear suspension received a completely redesigned multi-link independent system with a single fibreglass transverse leaf spring. The 1995 estate received independent rear suspension. Volvo reported that the single composite leaf spring used in the rear suspension of the 960 estate had the same mass as just one of the two springs it replaced. Boge's Nivomat self-leveling rear suspension system became an option rather than standard equipment.

Trim levels were GLT and SE for European markets.

From 1996, Volvo renamed the 960 in select markets as Volvo S90 (saloon) and Volvo V90 (estate) in alignment with the letter-and-number naming scheme used on their other models. This renaming applied to several European countries in late 1996, in North America from late 1996 for the 1997 model year, and in Australia from March 1997. The new name coincided with an improved air conditioning system.

All US cars were equipped with an electronically controlled Aisin AW-series automatic transmission. Beginning in the 1995 model year, European cars with the 2.5 L engines were also available with a manual transmission, the so-called M90, a strong new design that was derived from the Volvo 850's transmission. With the demise of the 2.5 L engine, the M90 was paired with a detuned version by using the B6244FS camshafts with lower lift and duration making the 3.0 204 hp engine into a 180 PS (132 kW) engine.

Production of the 960 and its S90 and V90 derivatives ended in 1998 with a total of 112,710 saloons and 41,619 estates.

The S90/V90 nameplate returned to use when Volvo introduced its flagship model in 2016.

== Specifications ==
=== Engines ===
These engines were offered in the 900 Series vehicles over the years:

Petrol engines
Model	Engine code	Year(s)	Power at rpm	Torque at rpm	Displacement	Engine config.
940	B200E	1991	115 PS (85 kW) at 5700	158 N⋅m (117 lb⋅ft) at 2800	1,986 cc (121.2 cu in)	I4
940 S/GL/GLE	B200F	1991–1995	112 PS (82 kW) at 5700	158 N⋅m (117 lb⋅ft) at 2800	1,986 cc (121.2 cu in)	I4
	B200G	1992–1994	111 PS (82 kW) at 5700	155 N⋅m (114 lb⋅ft) at 2800	1,986 cc (121.2 cu in)	I4
	B200GT	1992–1998	155 PS (114 kW) at 5600	230 N⋅m (170 lb⋅ft) at 3600	1,986 cc (121.2 cu in)	I4
940 2.0 8V Turbo / 940 Wentworth	B200FT	1991–1998	155 PS (114 kW) at 5600	230 N⋅m (170 lb⋅ft) at 3600	1,986 cc (121.2 cu in)	I4
940 2.0 16V	B204E	1991	139 PS (102 kW) at 6000	181 N⋅m (133 lb⋅ft) at 4800	1,986 cc (121.2 cu in)	I4
960 2.0 16V Turbo	B204FT	1991–1993	190 PS (140 kW) at 5300	280 N⋅m (207 lb⋅ft) at 2950	1,986 cc (121.2 cu in)	I4
960 2.0 16V Turbo	B204GT	1991–1993	200 PS (147 kW) at 5300	290 N⋅m (214 lb⋅ft) at 2950	1,986 cc (121.2 cu in)	I4
	B230E	1991	131 PS (96 kW)	190 N⋅m (140 lb⋅ft) at 3300	2,316 cc (141.3 cu in)	I4
940 GLE	B230F	1991–1994	116 hp (118 PS; 87 kW) at 5400	182 N⋅m (134 lb⋅ft) at 2500	2,316 cc (141.3 cu in)	I4
940 GL/GLE	B230FB	1991–1995	131 PS (96 kW) at 5500	185 N⋅m (136 lb⋅ft) at 2950	2,316 cc (141.3 cu in)	I4
940 (California Emissions)	B230FD	1993-1994	116 hp (118 PS; 87 kW) at 4900	182 N⋅m (134 lb⋅ft) at 2500	2,316 cc (141.3 cu in)	I4
940 Turbo/940SE (US)/960 2.3 Turbo	B230FT	1991–1998	165 hp (167 PS; 123 kW) at 4800	264 N⋅m (195 lb⋅ft) at 3450	2,316 cc (141.3 cu in)	I4
940 SE (Thailand), 940 Polar (LPT)	B230FK	1995–1998	135 PS (99 kW) at 4900	230 N⋅m (170 lb⋅ft) at 2300	2,316 cc (141.3 cu in)	I4
940	B230G	1992–1995	116 PS (85 kW) at 5500	185 N⋅m (136 lb⋅ft) at 2950	2,316 cc (141.3 cu in)	I4
940/960	B230GT	1991–1994	170 PS (125 kW) at 4800	265 N⋅m (195 lb⋅ft) at 3450	2,316 cc (141.3 cu in)	I4
	B230GK	1995–1998	135 PS (99 kW) at 4900	230 N⋅m (170 lb⋅ft) at 2300	2,316 cc (141.3 cu in)	I4
940 GLT 2.3 16V	B234F	1991–1992	155 PS (114 kW) at 5600	204 N⋅m (150 lb⋅ft) at 4800	2,316 cc (141.3 cu in)	I4
	B234G	1991–1992	155 PS (114 kW) at 5600	204 N⋅m (150 lb⋅ft) at 4800	2,316 cc (141.3 cu in)	I4
960	B280E	1991–1992	154 PS (113 kW) at 5400 Nordic version 170 PS (125 kW) at 5400 European version	240 N⋅m (177 lb⋅ft) at 4500	2,849 cc (173.9 cu in)	V6
960	B280F	1991–1992	147 PS (108 kW) at 5100	235 N⋅m (173 lb⋅ft) at 3750	2,849 cc (173.9 cu in)	V6
S90 (Asian Market)	B6244F	1995	163 PS (120 kW) at 5800	220 N⋅m (162 lb⋅ft) at 4400		I6
960 2.5 24V	B6254FS	1994–1997	170 PS (125 kW) at 5700	230 N⋅m (170 lb⋅ft) at 4400	2,473 cc (150.9 cu in)	I6
960 2.5 24V	B6254GS	1996	n/a	n/a	2,473 cc (150.9 cu in)	I6
960	B6304G	1996	204 PS (150 kW) at 6000	267 N⋅m (197 lb⋅ft) at 4300	2,922 cc (178.3 cu in)	I6
960	B6304S	1992–1997	204 PS (150 kW) at 6000	267 N⋅m (197 lb⋅ft) at 4300	2,922 cc (178.3 cu in)	I6
S90/V90 3.0 24V	B6304S2	1997–1998	180 PS (132 kW) at 5200	274 N⋅m (202 lb⋅ft) at 4100	2,922 cc (178.3 cu in)	I6
960/S90/V90 3.0 24V	B6304F; B6304FS	1991–1997	204 PS (150 kW) at 6000	267 N⋅m (197 lb⋅ft) at 4300	2,922 cc (178.3 cu in)	I6
960/S90/V90 3.0 24V	B6304FS2	1997–1998	180 PS (132 kW) at 5200	267 N⋅m (197 lb⋅ft) at 4000	2,922 cc (178.3 cu in)	I6

Diesel engines
Model	Engine code	Year(s)	Power at rpm	Torque at rpm	Displacement	Engine configuration
940 (Diesel)	D24	1992–1993	82 PS (60 kW) at 4700	145 N⋅m (107 lb⋅ft) at 2000	2,383 cc (145.4 cu in)	I6
940 (Turbodiesel)	D24T	1991–1993	112 PS (82 kW) at 4800	205 N⋅m (151 lb⋅ft) at 2500	2,383 cc (145.4 cu in)	I6
940 (Turbodiesel)	D24T	1991–1993	109 PS (80 kW) with EGR	190 N⋅m (140 lb⋅ft) at 2400 with EGR	2,383 cc (145.4 cu in)	I6
940/960 (Turbodiesel w/ Intercooler)	D24TIC	1991–1996	116 PS (85 kW) at 4800; 122 PS (90 kW) at 4800	225 N⋅m (166 lb⋅ft) at 2400; 240 N⋅m (177 lb⋅ft) at 2500	2,383 cc (145.4 cu in)	I6

- B200E: 2.0 L inline-4, naturally aspirated, Bosch K-Jetronic
- B200F: 2.0 L inline-4, naturally aspirated, Bosch LH-Jetronic
- B200K: 2.0 L inline-4, naturally aspirated, Renix ignition, 200K had standard head unlike 230K
- B200ET: 2.0 L inline-4, turbocharged, Bosch Motronic engine management
- B200FT: 2.0 L inline-4, turbocharged, Bosch LH-Jetronic 156 PS (115 kW)
- B204E: 2.0 L 16-valve, DOHC, inline-4, naturally aspirated
- B204F: 2.0 L 16-valve, DOHC, inline-4, naturally aspirated and catalyzed
- B204FT: 2.0 L 16-valve, DOHC, inline-4, turbocharged
- B204GT: 2.0 L 16-valve, DOHC, inline-4, turbocharged
- B230E: 2.3 L inline-4, naturally aspirated, Bosch K-Jetronic fuel injection
- B230F: 2.3 L inline-4, naturally aspirated, 114 hp
- B230K: 2.3 L inline-4, naturally aspirated, Renix ignition, Heron head (introduced for the '85 model year)
- B230ET: 2.3 L inline-4, turbocharged, Bosch Motronic (introduced in the '85 model year)
- B230FK: 2.3 L inline-4, turbocharged, Low Pressure Turbo ('95— ), 135 hp
- B230FT: 2.3 L inline-4, turbocharged, 165 hp
- B234F: 2.3 L 16-valve, DOHC, inline-4, naturally aspirated, 155 hp
- B230FB: 2.3 L inline-4, naturally aspirated
- B280E: 2.8 L V6, naturally aspirated, Bosch LH-Jetronic 2.2, even fire crankshaft
- B280F: 2.8 L V6, naturally aspirated, Bosch LH-Jetronic, even fire crankshaft
- D24: 2.4 L inline-6 diesel, naturally aspirated (Volkswagen)
- D24T: 2.4 L inline-6, turbo diesel, variant of the LT35 engine manufactured by Volkswagen
- D24TIC: 2.4 L inline-6, turbodiesel, intercooled, variant of the LT35 engine manufactured by Volkswagen
- B6244/B6254: 2.4/2.5 L 24-valve inline-6, naturally aspirated
- B6304: 2.9 L 24-valve inline-6, naturally aspirated

=== Transmissions ===
Volvo offered various transmissions depending on the year/model/engine combinations including the:

- M46 manual transmission (4-speed + Laycock de Normanville overdrive)
- M47 manual transmission (5-speed)
- M90 manual transmission (5-speed)
- AW30-40 electronically controlled automatic transmission (4-speed, lockup torque converter)
- AW70/AW70L automatic transmission (3-speed + overdrive, lockup torque converter on some models)
- AW71 automatic transmission (3-speed + overdrive)
- AW72L automatic transmission (4-speed, lockup torque converter)
- ZF 4HP22 automatic transmission (4-speed, lockup torque converter)
