= M90 =

M90 or M-90 may refer to:

== Military ==
- M90 (camouflage), a camouflage pattern used by the Swedish armed forces
- Zastava M90, a Yugoslav modern assault rifle
- Sanomalaite M/90, a Finnish communications device

== Transportation ==
- Lotus M90, a concept car
- M-90 (Michigan highway), a state highway in Michigan, United States
- M90 motorway, a motorway in Scotland
- McDonnell Douglas MD-90, a twin-engine commercial jet airliner
- Mendota Airport (FAA location identifier: M90), an airport in Mendota, California, United States
- Volvo M90 transmission, a gearbox for the Volvo 900 Series models of cars
- Mitsubishi SpaceJet M90, a regional jet aircraft

== Other uses ==
- Barrett M90, a bullpup sniper rifle
- M 90, an age group for Masters athletics (athletes aged 35+)
- Messier 90 (M90), a spiral galaxy in the Virgo cluster
- Dell Precision M90, a Dell workstation notebook
