= Portaro =

Automobile manufacturer

- Industry: Automotive
- Founder: Hipólito Pires; José Megre

Portaro
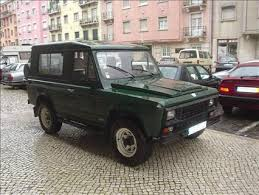
- A 1990s Portaro 280DCM 2800 Diesel 4WD

Overview
- Manufacturer: Portaro
- Production: 1975-1995
- Assembly: Lisbon, Portugal

Body and chassis
- Body style: Sport utility vehicles

Portaro was a Portuguese 4WD offroad utility vehicle which was based on the earlier Romanian original ARO 24 Series 4X4 model produced under license in Portugal. Portaro 4WD models were made between 1975 until 1995. The Portaro name was a portmanteau of "PORT" for "Portugal" and "ARO", the Romanian manufacturer of the offroad vehicles used as the base.

== History ==
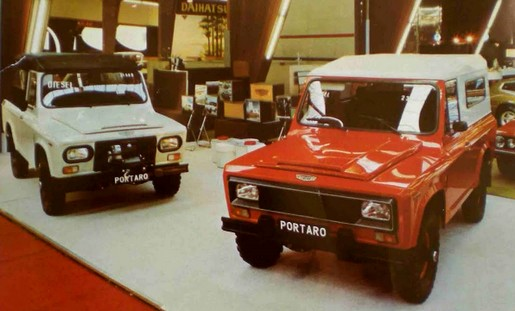
1981 Portaro 260 and 240

Land Rovers had been imported to Portugal by a company called Garagem Vitória (GV) in Lisbon, but when British Leyland decided to take over distribution, GV found themselves looking for a replacement. The idea of locally assembling imported, Romanian ARO body and chassis in CKD form with Western engines was born. Sociedade Electromecânica de Automóveis (SEMAL) was formed, with entrepreneur and industrialist Hipólito Pires as Technical Director, with help from business partner José Megre and mechanical engineer Costa Freitas. The initial plan had been to use Perkins diesel engines, but diesel engines from Peugeot were also installed early on, along with petrol engines from Volvo and Opel. Finally, GV obtained the distributorship for Daihatsus and Portaros began installing Daihatsu diesel engines. The first Portaro was built in 1975.

Their vehicle sold under the new brandname Portaro was an improved derivative version from the original ARO 240 4WD Series from the 1970s looking very similar in concept and style to the British worldwide famous Landrover 4WD but using an original Romanian cross country standard iron chassis and many parts, instead of industrial aluminium.

After the first model, the Portaro 240 2500 4X4, sales were instant as there was no other new domestic rival at the time, save for the Landrover. The brand name Portaro 4X4 appeared in 1975 and came in two main versions: The Portaro 4X4 200 Series, an offroad utility jeep, and later in 1977, the Portaro Campina 4X4, the 300 Series, an offroad pickup truck version both models enjoying healthy sales in the 1970s and 1980s with hardly any equivalent rivals to match at the time with its own new original Model Range quickly being offered to potential plentiful owners.

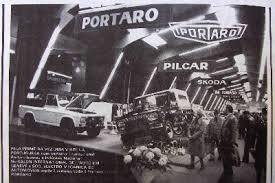
Portaro at International Auto Showroom - 1980s

Most of the Portaro 4X4 vehicles produced were originally fitted with Daihatsu Diesel 2500cc and 2800cc engined 4WD models like the "240, 250, 260, 280" followed by the 4WD pick up models "Campina 280L, 320" and "350 Super". In addition to several other new 4WD prototypes, two new Portaro models were also manufactured beginning in 1982: the "210 PT Turbo 4WD" and "230 PV 4WD" were powered by Volvo Redblock engines, 2127 cc and 2316 cc engines more typically seen in the Volvo 240 Series cars at the time. These were mainly intended for motorsports, being seen in events like local offroad motor racing and rally racing during the 1980s. The 230 PV became the most successful Portuguese-made vehicle ever used for offroad racing.

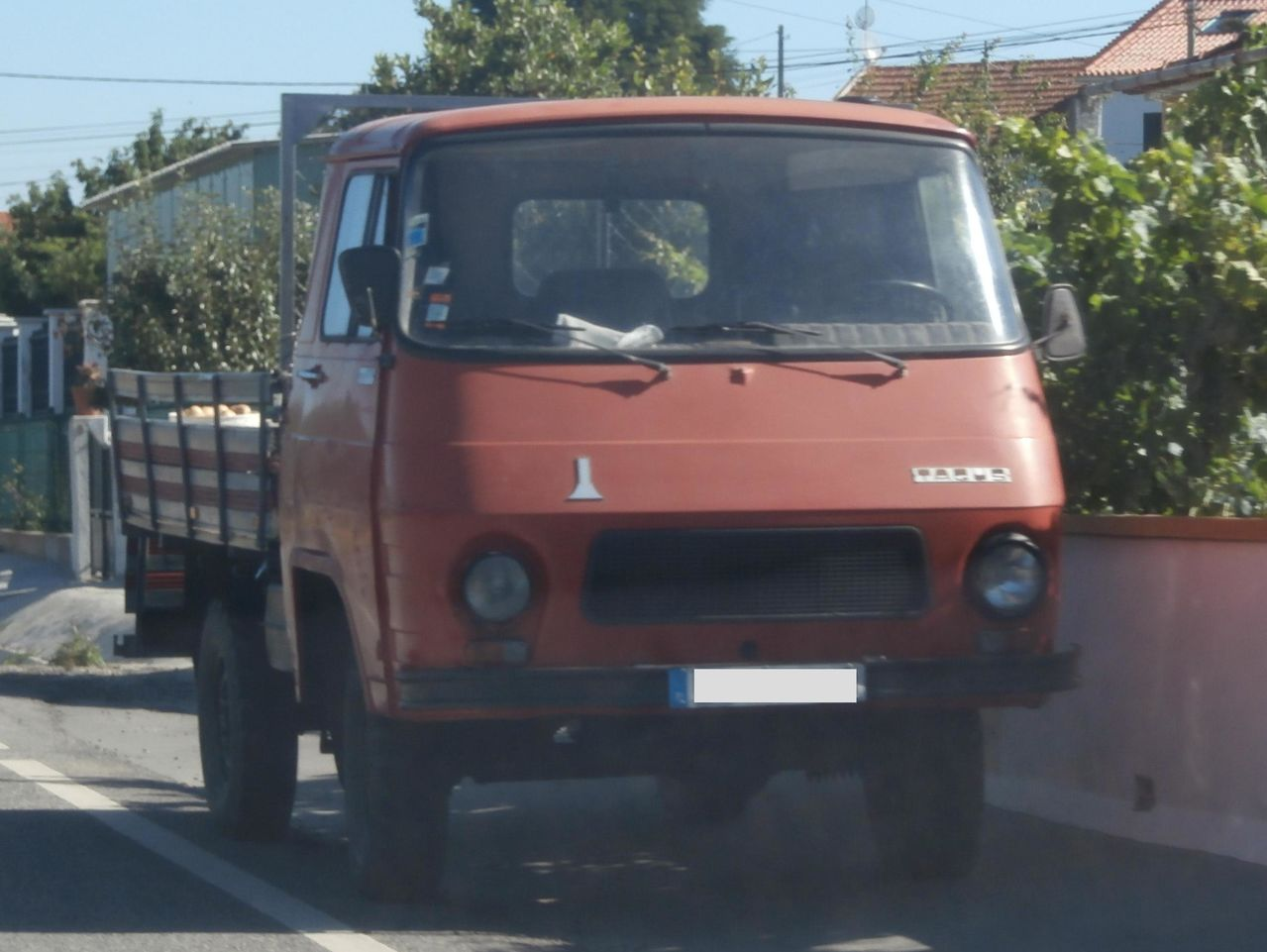
Semal Tagus Diesel 4X4, a licence built Rocar TV van with the mechanical part from an ARO 24

== Model Range ==
This is a complete list of all the original GV-Semal brand, makers of the Tagus and the Portaro Model Range of 4X4 vehicles manufactured 1975-1995 including the models later produced by the FMAT company.

=== GV Semal Tagus 4WD Model Range ===
Made from 1976 to about 1986. All were based on the original Romanian Rocar TV 4WD model and all are fitted with the Daihatsu 2530 cc 76 PS (56 kW) diesel engine. Around 5,000 units were produced in total. The only model offered was called Tagus GV 250 Diesel 2500 4X4; it was available in eight different bodystyles: Furgão (three-seater van), Misto (six-seater glazed van), Pickup (three-seater truck), Ambulance, bare chassis truck, Fire Engine, Military Truck, Minibus.

=== GV Semal Portaro 4WD Model Range ===
(From 1975 the original offroad models started production at the SEMAL factory in industrial Setubal later production moving northeast to the FMAT factory at Tramagal ending here in 1995)

- Portaro 230PV 4X4 Rally (A light rally racing model used in the famous gruelling 1983 Paris-Dakar Rallye Event quickly became a winner.)
- Portaro 230PVCM 4X4 Funcar (Same as above but more of a roofless offroad leisure type funcar.)
- Portaro 230PVP 4X4 Pickup Petrol (Same as above but with factory welded cargo box behind the 3 seater cab.)
- Portaro 240D Diesel 4X4 (The very first Portaro offroad jeep with Daihatsu DG30 2530cc diesel engine launched in 1975.)
- Portaro 240D Diesel 4X4 Pickup (Same as above, it was a 3-seater cab useful pickup truck.)
- Portaro 240D Diesel 4X4 Furgão (A three-seater basic closed offroad Van model.)
- Portaro 240D Diesel 4X4 Especial (A forestry work/armytruck model fitted with winch, large tyres and other extras for specialized roles)
- Portaro 250DGL Diesel (The only Portaro model without 4X4 axles instead has just RWD only, about 1000 or so of these were made.)
- Portaro 250 FMAT ID Diesel 4X4 (The last new known Portaro 4X4 model available for the 1990s with modern Ford Transit mechanicals and parts)
- Portaro 260D Diesel 4X4 Cabriolet Especial (A Convertible jeep with new engine & new gearbox, and several luxury items.)
- Portaro 260D Diesel 4X4 Jipe (Same as above with new Daihatsu running gear, new suspension, removable rooftop & parts.)
- Portaro 260D Diesel 4X4 Pickup (Same as above, a pickup truck model, with new 3 seater cab and new redesigned interior.)
- Portaro 260DCM Diesel 4X4 Furgão (As above but has a redesigned interior, improved construction and new components.)
- Portaro 280DCM Diesel 4X4 Jipe (Another new model nine seater now using new Daihatsu 2800cc Diesel & optional 2800cc Turbodiesel engines.)
- Portaro 280DCM Diesel 4X4 Ambulance (As above but with a new 5 speed gearbox and improved 3 range offroad transfer case.)
- Portaro 280DCM Diesel 4X4 Furgão (A 3-seater van bodied model powered by modern Daihatsu 2800 mechanicals.)
- Portaro 280DCM Diesel 4X4 Bombeiros (Popular model to carry firemen and their firefighting equipment of which several hundred of these were ordered)

Also, at the FMAT factory complex any potential customer to Special Order could choose the current original Daihatsu TURBODIESEL 2800cc 117 bhp running gear to be supplied to any of the original Portaro 280 4WD Series similar to those as used in the popular DAIHATSU Delta lorries, Rocky, Taft and Wildcat 4WD models.

- Portaro Campina 280L Diesel 4X4 Pickup truck (An 1980s new pickup truck fitted with modern Daihatsu Diesel 2785cc running gear )
- Portaro Campina 320 Diesel 4X4 Pickup truck (Originally made in the late 1970s a very popular model with Daihatsu Diesel 2530cc mechanicals)
- Portaro Campina 350 Super Diesel 4X4 Pickup truck (A restyled model with new interior, new independent suspension and new longer chassis.)
- Portaro Celta 210PT TURBO 4X4 (A kind of a Range Rover 4X4 luxury model and now very rare with Volvo BE2120 Turbocharged petrol car engine.)
- Portaro Celta 260 TURBODIESEL 4X4 (Another rare Range Rover type 4X4 luxury jeep powered by Daihatsu Turbo Diesel 2530cc 96 BHP engine.)
- Portaro Celta 280DCM Diesel (From the 1990s a regular nine-seater 4X4 model.)
- Portaro Celta 280DCM Cabriolet (From the 1990s A Hardtop removable roof Convertible model)
- Portaro Pampas 260 Diesel 4X4 (For Export only with standard RHD for the UK Market)
- Portaro Pampas 260DP Diesel 4X4 Pickup (For Export only with standard RHD for the UK Market)
- Portaro Jipe 1984 Diesel 4X4 (Single white prototype made was a new 3 to 9 passenger model but never produced)
- Portaro NATO GVM Diesel 4X4 (Single prototype Military new model but never produced)

By 1990 the original company who assembled Portaro 4X4 offroad vehicles SEMAL sold the production rights, the tradename and all the spares parts stocks to the larger "FMAT" company at Tramagal an industrial town near Abrantes east of Lisbon next to the famous Tagus river in rural Santarem who have been making agricultural equipment and industrial machinery since the late 1890s. Motor vehicle assembly was to become an important thing and the firm actually were assembling original French Berliet lorries of many types in the 1950s until the 1980s a weekly operation at FMAT so output production had quadrupled than it was before making Portaro brand name once more relaunched to the market after a brief absence but this time with a updated new Portaro Model Range for the 1980s. Around 500 Portaros were built at the FMAT manufacturing facilities, with a total of around 7,000 Portaros having been built by 1990.

During the 1990s the Portuguese New Automobile Market the Portaro brand name was facing a stiff competition with many other offroad vehicles and other 4WD manufacturers offering much better prices while others sold superior models too so their sales dwindled slightly and UMM 4X4 the other domestic manufacturer of similar nature were also facing similar situations but at least UMM brand name still sold well. Therefore the FMAT company decided at the time to reduce some of their original Portaro model range due to the economical and financial unrest at the time of the 1990s in Europe particularly in Portugal but unfortunately most of the spare parts were nearly stocked out forcing FMAT to rebuild their own current Portaro model range now fitting them with new modern updated Ford Transit TDI 2500cc 96BHP running gear with higher torque and more powerful engines needed for these large vehicles which became the later "Portaro 250 FMAT ID 4X4", however sales took a downturn in about 1994 and to make matters worse the stocked ARO original spare parts were now running low too in the assembly workshops forcing to a reduced production run of the Portaro brand so it was inevitable that FMAT could not handle this situation any longer and a year later by the Summer of 1995 this marked the end of the Portaro Portuguese brand name thirty years after it arrived upon the scene in the automobile market always enjoying happy sales and with a remarkable automobile career.

Classic Portaro 4X4 vehicles are now rare; the peak of production was about 1,000 per annum in the 1980s. Many 1970s/1980s models are preserved, while others have been entirely rebuilt or are being restored.

== See also ==
- Auverland
- Cournil
- UMM
- Paris-Dakar Rallye
