= Volvo Halifax Assembly =

Car factory in Halifax, Nova Scotia

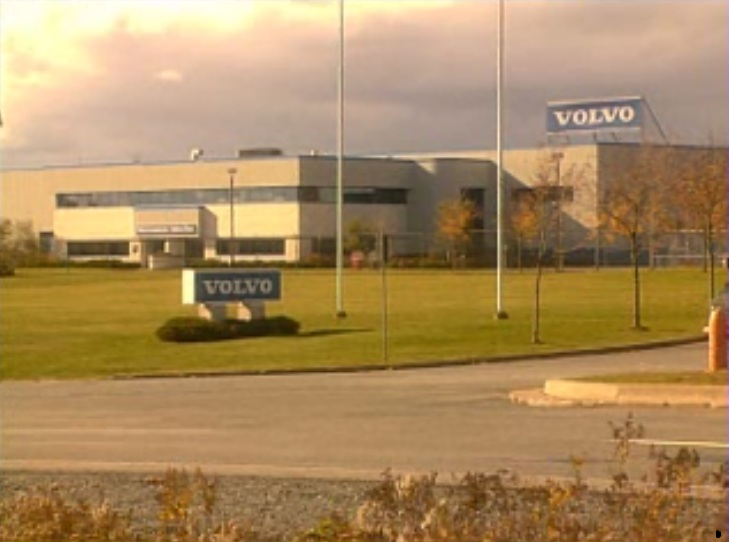
Volvo assembly plant in Bayers Lake Industrial Park, opened in 1987

The Volvo Halifax Assembly Plant was an automobile manufacturing plant owned by Swedish company Volvo and located in Halifax Regional Municipality, Nova Scotia, Canada. It was the second Volvo plant outside of Sweden and the third non-domestic auto plant in North America after Fiat and Rolls-Royce.

It was operated by Volvo Canada Limited (now Volvo Cars of Canada Corporation) in Toronto, Ontario, and bridged the gap between Volvo of North America (Rockleigh, New Jersey), Volvo headquarters and the flagship Torslanda plant in Gothenburg.

== Operations ==
The original plant at Dartmouth was opened on 11 June 1963 by Prince Bertil. The premises were leased from Atlantic Sugar Refineries (now Lantic Sugar). Volvo decided to open the plant to bypass hefty North American import tariffs on foreign goods and to capitalize on the newly signed Canadian/American Auto Pact. The plant was unlike any other assembly plant Volvo was operating at the time. This was mainly due to the plant's trademark team system that assembled the entire vehicle at one station, which was extensively used later at Volvo Torslanda Assembly and then Volvo Kalmar Assembly.

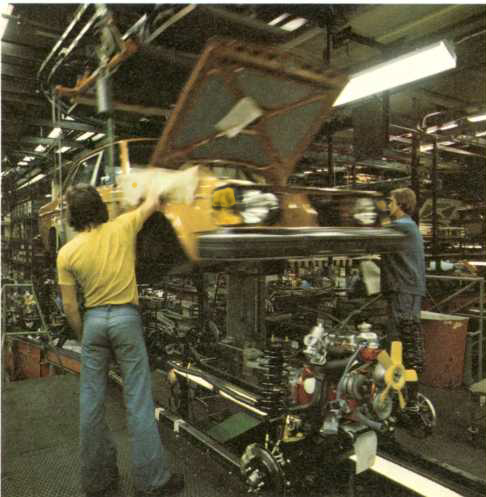
Workers at Volvo Halifax Assembly prepare to mate the frame and chassis of a Volvo 244

In 1966, annual production totaled over 3,700 cars. Volvo 122 S, 123 GT and 122 B18s were assembled in Halifax initially, the Volvo PV544 was introduced a year later. Halifax built 123 GT models like the 122 S were rebadged as "Canadian GT"s. Units produced at the plant typically came without auxiliary lights and had only one side-view mirror, but came with a limited-slip differential and hazard flashers. Halifax built Canadian GTs were available in colours such as light green (91), light blue (95), and dark blue (96) and are often seen with identification codes 5145 or 5324. For three years the plant operated out of this harbourfront facility (an old sugar processing plant) located on Halifax Harbour's Eastern Passage.

On 14 April 1967, a replacement plant at Pier 9 in Halifax was opened. The project was financed by provincial Crown corporation Industrial Estates Limited, which leased the harbourfront site from the National Harbours Board, providing the Volvo plant with its own unloading space on the pier. The new plant enabled production to exceed 8,000 cars per year. Cars were shipped from Sweden in CKD form, then assembled at the facility. Production on average at the Dartmouth Plant was about 15 cars per day. At the new facility, production increased to over 36 cars a day. And, in 1974, production at the plant increased to more than 12,000 vehicles a year.

In 1986, Volvo Canada announced plans to construct a new plant to build the Volvo 740, which the company said required more space for assembly than the existing factory could provide. The new C$13.5-million plant, located in the Bayers Lake Industrial Park, began operating in late 1987, and achieved full production in April 1988.

In 1993, the Halifax operation celebrated its 30th anniversary. To mark the occasion 940s built at the facility were affixed with a special roundel affixed to the rear quarter window.

While the plant was very successful, on September 9, 1998 Volvo decided to close the Halifax plant and end its 225 jobs, citing globalization and NAFTA as two of the reasons. The last Volvo was built in Canada on 18 December 1998. The Bayer's Lake plant building at 115 Chain Lake Drive still stands.

== Labour controversy and occupation ==
Shortly after the closure announcement the plant became the focus of a dispute between Volvo and the Canadian Auto Workers Union. On 21 October 1998, thirty employees blockaded the plant after Volvo refused to pay what the union considered adequate severance pay and retirement benefits to the plant's employees. After several days, Volvo backed down and agreed to the union's payment specifications.

== Legacy ==
The first Volvo produced at the facility, also the first Volvo produced outside of Europe, is a black 1963 Volvo 122 B18 currently on permanent display at the Nova Scotia Museum of Industry in Stellarton, Nova Scotia.

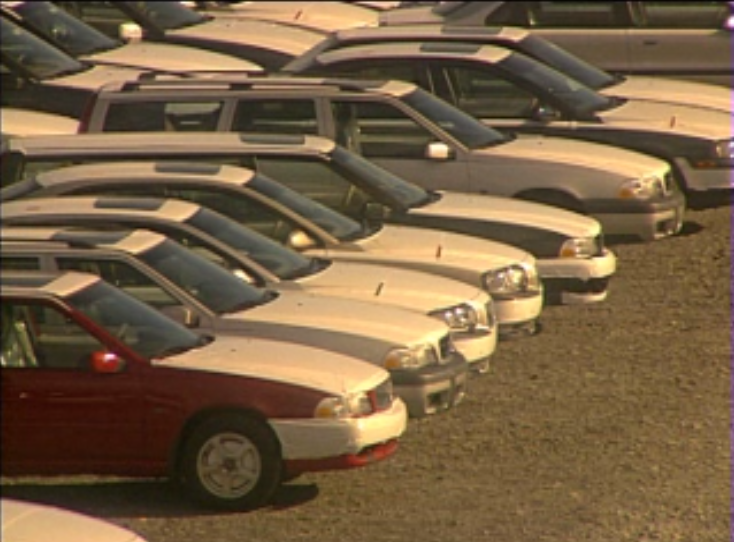
The last vehicles built at the Volvo Halifax Assembly Plant

In 1969, 26 Volvo bodies intended for the plant were dumped into the Bedford Basin after incurring severe water damage in transit across the Atlantic Ocean on a container ship.

In 1980, two Canadians broke the Guinness World record for the fastest time around the world in a Halifax-built Volvo 245 DL nicknamed Red Cloud. Ken Langley and Gary Sowerby completed the feat in just 74 days, 1 hour and 11 minutes, smashing the previous record by over a month.

Shortly before the plant's closure, popular Canadian comedy/satire show This Hour Has 22 Minutes and correspondent Mary Walsh filmed an entire segment at the plant.

The Canadian Museum of Science and Technology paid tribute to the plant by featuring a 1989 Volvo 740 GLE that had been produced at that plant in a permanent exhibit entitled "The Quest in Search of the Canadian Car".

== Models produced ==
- Volvo PV544 (Produced only at Dartmouth facility.)
- Volvo 120 (Badged as the "Volvo Canadian")
- Volvo 140
- Volvo 240 (All models, including second generation body style)
- Volvo 740 (produced in Bayers Lake)
- Volvo 760 (Some pre-1987 models)
- Volvo 850 (Very low production number)
- Volvo 940 (Most North American versions)
- Volvo S70 and Volvo V70
- Volvo S80 (1998 models only)
