= Volvo M90 transmission =

Gearbox for the Volvo 940 models

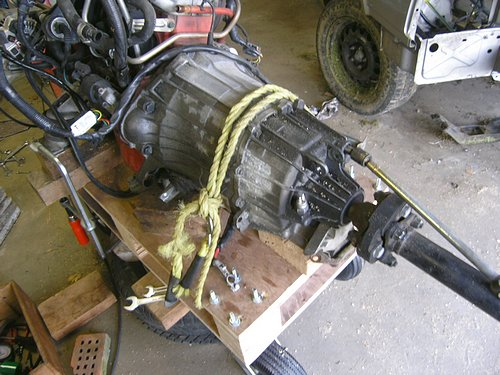
A M90 transmission mounted to a Volvo Redblock Engine

M90 is the model designation for an automotive rear-wheel drive gearbox that was introduced in mid-1994 Volvo 940/960. The M90 RWD gearbox and the M56 FWD gearbox are considered to be brother and sister because they are built on the same gearbox platform and have many parts in common. All turbocars have the M90 gearbox as standard from 1995.

The gearbox is made by Getrag in Germany and it is of a 3-axle design, deriving from the Volvo M56 gearbox of the front wheel driven 850 series.

There are three variations of the gearbox. There is a version for the cast-iron 4-cylinder engines of the 940 (redblock), the all aluminum 6-cylinder of the 960 (whiteblock), and the version for the Volkswagen 6-cylinder diesel engine D24TIC. The differences are the bell housing bolt pattern and the output shaft flange with a 3-bolt flange for the redblock/diesel engines and a 4 bolt flange for whiteblock engines. The variant for the 6-cylinder Volvo engine will fit on all 4/5/6 all-aluminum Volvo N/RN-series engines.

The clutch is hydraulically operated by a master/slave cylinder setup with a normal clutch fork and throw out bearing. The flywheels used with these gearboxes are dual mass versions (petrol engines) to eliminate the noise that 3-axle (3-shift) gearboxes can make in neutral, and a regular (single mass) flywheels for the diesel engine.

All gears, including the reverse gear, are synchronized.

The M90 gearbox is available with different gear ratios.

Gear	M90H1	M90H2	M90L1	M90L2
1	3.54:1	3.54:1	3.91:1	3.91:1
2	2.05:1	2.05:1	2.20:1	2.20:1
3	1.38:1	1.38:1	1.38:1	1.38:1
4	1.00:1	1.00:1	1.00:1	1.00:1
5	0.81:1	0.70:1	0.81:1	0.70:1
Reverse	3.00:1	3.00:1	3.00:1	3.00:1

This gearbox is the strongest manual transmission that Volvo fitted to their rear-wheel-drive cars. The H2 and L2 versions are stronger than the H and L versions. There is a common belief that H is stronger than L, but the only difference between H and L is the gear ratio. In 1997, M90 H2 and M90 L2 were introduced. This revised model of the M90, had an improved design of the 3rd gear synchronous ring; to prevent premature failure of the transmission. But they did not improve on the stopring flange for 3rd gear.

It is possible to modify the stopring of the M90 H and M90 L gearboxes, to eliminate the problem. To do so, one must open up the transmission and weld the stopring in its place. There is a misconception that you can weld the synchronous ring, when its in fact the stopring that needs welding in order for the 3rd gear to not travel out of reach from the ingresses. It's an easy fix for both the old and revised transmissions.
