= Volvo Kalmar Assembly =

Production facility of Volvo Cars

The Volvo Kalmar plant was a production facility of Volvo Cars, just outside Kalmar, Sweden. Construction began in 1971 and it opened in 1974. It benefited from Volvo Halifax Assembly and Volvo Torslanda Assembly as examples. The Kalmar plant introduced the team assembly system.

== History ==
Production was carried out on 18 ft (5.5 m) battery-driven carriers, which held one car body at a time. The carriers were designed to swivel and rotate the bodies so that workers could access every element of the car in a practical fashion. They held a car in the best ergonomic position, to reduce work-related injuries. The carriers followed wires embedded in the floor, allowing them to move around more freely. Carriers could be parked in buffer zones, e.g., to cope with missing parts.

The plant closed in 1994.

== Team assembly ==
The teams organized themselves and worked at the speed they choose. While a worker on a conventional assembly line might spend an entire shift mounting one license-plate lamp after another, members of a Kalmar work team could work at one time or another on all parts of the electrical system—from taillights to turn signals, head lamps, horn, fuse box and part of the electronically controlled fuel injection system. The only requirement was that every team meet its production goal for a shift.

As long as cars rolled out on schedule, workers were free to take coffee breaks when they please or to refresh themselves in comfortable lounges equipped with kitchens and saunas. The system operated either docked or in-line.

Docked assembly was carried out by teams of 2-3 that covered one aspect of the car on multiple vehicles or docked where teams of 3 built entire vehicles. Kalmar had 25 production teams. Every team had access to a separate break room, workshop and sauna.

== Models ==
- Volvo 164
- Volvo 240
- Volvo 260
- Volvo 760
- Volvo 740
- Volvo 940
- Volvo 960
