= Samuel Dalziel Heron =

American aerospace engineer (1893–1965)

- Born: 18 May 1891; Newcastle-upon-Tyne, England
- Died: 10 July 1963 (aged 72)
- Engineering career
- Discipline: Aircraft Engine Design
- Employers: Royal Aircraft Factory, Siddeley-Deasy, Ethyl Corporation
- Significant design: Heron cylinder head
- Significant advance: Sodium cooled poppet valves

Samuel Dalziel Heron (18 May 1891 – 10 July 1963) was a British born aerospace engineer who made major contributions to the design of piston engines. While working in Britain he carried out the first systematic research into air-cooled cylinders. In the U.S.A he contributed to the design of the Curtiss R-1454, invented the sodium cooled poppet valve and became technical director for aeronautical research for the Ethyl Corporation.

== Early life ==
Sam Dalziel Heron was born on 18 May 1893, in Newcastle upon Tyne, England. He attended Alleyn's School in Dulwich, Goldsmiths' College (London University) and Durham University, near Newcastle upon Tyne.

== Early career in the United Kingdom ==
During the First World War, Heron worked at the Royal Aircraft Factory. From 1915 to 1916 he worked with Professor A.H. Gibson on the first systematic research into the design of air-cooled engine cylinders. They concluded that (1) aluminium should be used for efficient conduction (2) the cylinder head should be in one piece because conduction through metal-to-metal interfaces could not be guaranteed (3) the cylinder head should provide the shortest escape path for heat at the hottest parts across the greatest cross section. Working with Major F. M. Green, they developed the RAF.8. This was a 14-cylinder 300 hp radial engine of great promise, but it was never built by the Royal Aircraft Factory. When the RAF ceased engine design, the RAF8 was passed to Armstrong-Siddeley, and that firm ran the first example, renamed the Jaguar, in 1922.

On the breakup of the Royal Aircraft Factory in 1917 he joined Siddeley-Deasy. He disagreed with J.D Siddeley over the redesign of the Siddeley-Deasy Puma cylinder head and other design policies. As a result, he resigned and left for the United States in 1921.

== Career in the United States ==
Heron arrived in the United States in 1921 to work on military applications of the two-valve air-cooled cylinder. In 1934 he became Director of Aeronautical Research at the Ethyl Corporation in Detroit, a position he held until his retirement in 1946.

== Awards ==
Manley Medal for 'Meritorious contributions to Aircraft Engineering' 1928

Certificate of Merit for Outstanding Fidelity and Meritorious conduct in aid of the war effort against the common enemies of the United States and its Allies in World War II (1948)

== Patents ==
1. 19230807 GB 19230020147 19230807, Sam Dalziel Heron, "Improvements in the cooling of valves or other moving parts of internal combustion engines that are subject to high temperature", published 7 November 1924, issued 7 August 1923

== Publications ==
1. Robert Schlaifer; Samuel Dalziel Heron; Harvard University. Graduate School of Business Administration. Division of Research (1950). Development of Aviation Fuels. Division of Research, Graduate School of Business Administration, Harvard University.
2. Samuel Dalziel Heron (1955). A Discussion of the Gas Turbine and the Problems of Applying it to Ground Vehicles. Ethyl Corporation.
3. Samuel Dalziel Heron (1961). History of the Aircraft Piston Engine: A Brief Outline. Ethyl Corp., Research and Development Dept.
4. Samuel Dalziel Heron (1965). S.D. Heron: His Autobiography.

== See also ==
- Heron cylinder head

== Cited sources ==
- Lumsden, Alec (2003). British Piston Aero Engines and Their Aircraft. The Crowood Press Ltd. ISBN 978-1853102943.
