= Hipólito Pires =

Portuguese businessman

- Occupation: Businessman

Hipólito Pires is a Portuguese businessman and co-founder of Portaro, along with José Megre in 1975.

Pires and José Megre became business partners when they decided to create a motor vehicle assembly production line, under the name "Projecto Portaro." Large loans of Portuguese-state funds were granted to start this joint-venture automobile plan. Initially the GV-Garagem Vitoria, one of the main domestic Motor Car importers, were to collect and receive the ARO vehicles from Romania at the docks in CKD form. The cars were then transported to the final production facility in Setubal. Here several 4X4 prototype models were built in 1975, all with different running gear fitted for testing in all kinds of environment and treatment.

Soon enough, Pires went to Japan in search for a well-known manufacturer and supplier of modern running gear, but only Daihatsu Motor Company of Osaka, Japan agreed to help him out and negotiations started. Not long after, the Brandname of PORTARO 4WD vehicles were launched after their vehicles were involved in off-road trials and other successful evaluations. The motor vehicle production was officially started by the recently formed SEMAL company.
