= Heron cylinder head =

Type of internal combustion engine cylinder head

A Heron cylinder head, or simply Heron head, is a design for the combustion chambers of the cylinder head on an internal combustion piston engine, named for engine designer S. D. Heron. The head is machined flat, with recesses only for inlet and exhaust valves, spark plugs, injectors and so on. The combustion chamber itself is contained within a dished depression in the top of the piston. The Heron head is suitable for petrol and diesel engines, for ohv and ohc valve-gear, and for small and large engine displacement capacities.

While a flat cylinder head could be combined with simple flat-top pistons, that option ignores the reasons for having a depression in the top of each piston, namely: (i) it provides a compact space for combustion to begin, allowing an optimal flame front; and (ii) it creates significant "squish" as the piston reaches TDC. This causes turbulence, which is desirable because it promotes more extensive mixing of the fuel/air mixture. Having no space available at the top of piston travel to maintain compression ratio would also mean that the air-fuel mixture would be compressed to zero volume (or close), which is far too high a compression ratio for any internal combustion engine to run on (due to detonation before the piston even reached top dead center) unless the stroke was carefully designed to leave a small gap between the top of the cylinder and the head when the piston is at TDC; in a normal engine the size of the combustion chamber dictates the compression ratio of the engine (i.e. the volume of the cylinder is compressed into the space of the chamber at TDC; a flat piston and flat head would leave no space for the air-fuel mixture, unless designed so the piston doesn't actually reach the top of the cylinder bore).

== Pros and cons ==
- Advantages include: simplicity of manufacture; compact dimensions; accuracy of the flat machined surface; simplified valve-gear; efficient combustion with good fuel economy.
- Disadvantages include: the greater size and weight of each piston; volumetric efficiency poorer than conventional cylinder heads with non parallel valves.

== Applications ==
- Alfa Romeo Alfasud boxer engine
- Audi F103 pushrod four engine used in different Audi models of the 1960s and 1970s
- Chevrolet 348-409 V8 engines, 1958-1965
- Ford 383-410-430-462 "MEL" V-8 engines, 1958-1968
- Ford 401-477-534 "Super Duty" V-8 engines, 1957-1982
- Ford Essex V4 engine
- Ford Essex V6 engine
- Ford Kent engine
- Jaguar V12 engine
- Puma racing engines
- Moto Guzzi
- Moto Morini 3½ & 500
- Renault F-Type engine also named B18E/B18F/B18FT by Volvo applied to the Volvo 440/460 and Volvo 480.
- Rover 2000 P6
- Standard Wetliner I4 engine as used in Standard 2000 which is a licensed Rover SD1
- Volkswagen EA827 engine (e.g. the 1600cc 100 bhp engine of Audi 80 GT)
- Volkswagen EA111 engine (e.g. the 1300cc 54 bhp engine of VW Polo 86c2f)
- Volkswagen EA831 engine also used in Porsche 924
- Volkswagen Wasserboxer engine of Vanagon
- Volvo B200K/B230K engine applied to the Volvo 200, 360, 740 and 940 in some markets.
