= Squish (piston engine) =

Effect in internal combustion engines

Squish band

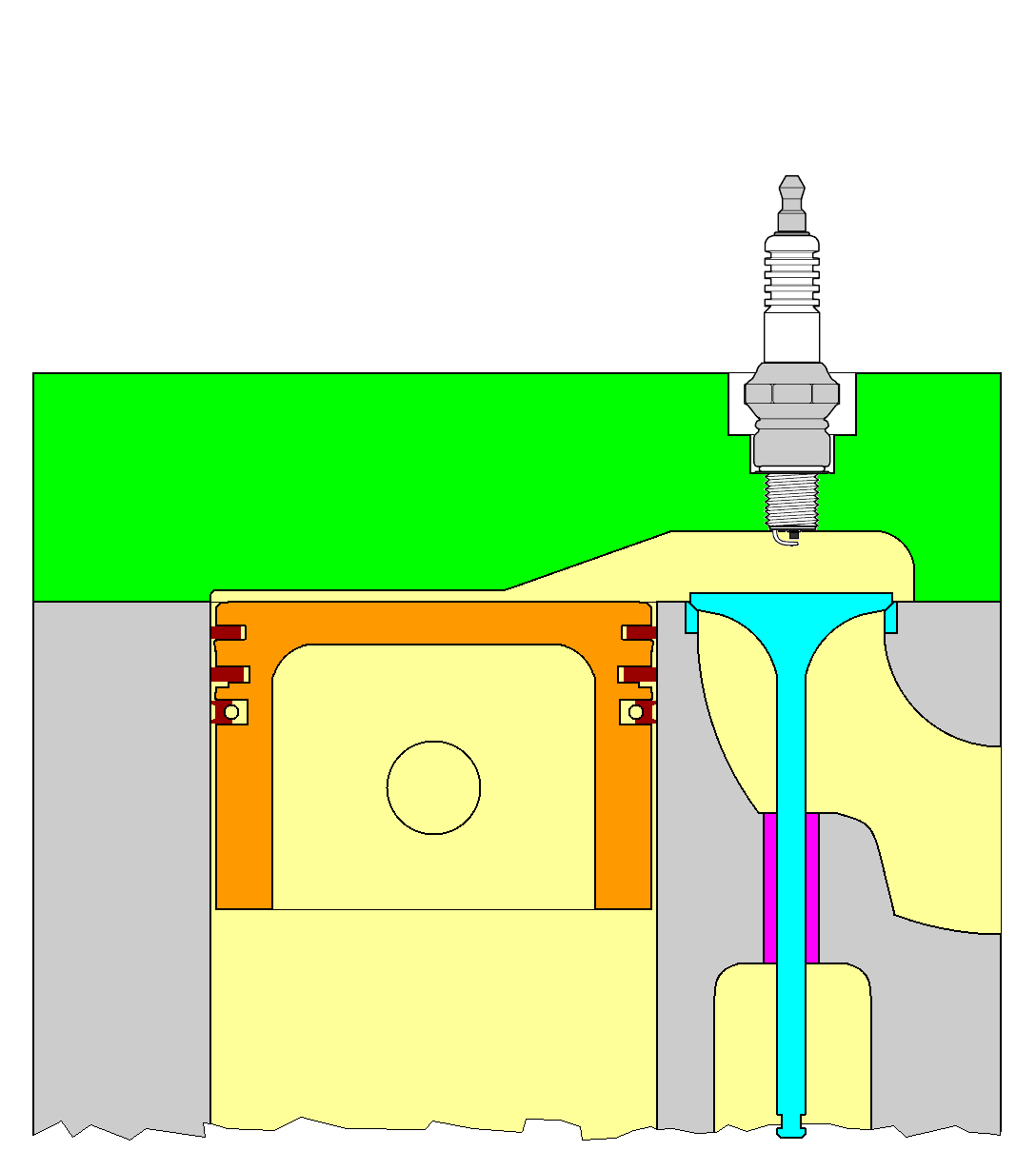
Flathead with squish

Squish is an effect in internal combustion engines which creates sudden turbulence of the air-fuel mixture as the piston approaches top dead centre (TDC).

In an engine designed to use the squish effect, at top dead centre the piston crown comes very close (typically less than 1 mm) to the cylinder head. The gases are suddenly "squished" out within the combustion chamber, creating turbulence which promotes thorough air-fuel mixing, a factor beneficial to efficient combustion. Squish effect may be found in side-valve, OHV and OHC engines, including engines with a Heron cylinder head. Squish effect may be found in any fuel type internal combustion piston engine. Squish piston engines are also found in both two stroke and four stroke engines.

Turbulence in the combustion chamber due to this squish helps with air-fuel mixing, cylinder wall heat transfer, thermal efficiency, and overall engine performance. Heat transfer is aided when the combustion gasses swirl around and heat the cylinder wall, allowing the cooling system to work more efficiently. This efficiency and swirling can also reduce the amount of soot production.

== Design Types ==
Squish piston engines are achieved by modifying an engine's head, block, or the piston crown. Some engine designs include combinations of these different design types. These combinations are used when certain design parameters that attribute the shape and constraints of the combustion chamber.

=== Modified Head ===
Modified head squish piston engines utilise a space in the head to make an air pocket for squishing and combustion to occur. Depending on the shape of the pocket and what type of engine, the valve position must be skewed to ensure that both the intake and exhaust valve can fit in the pocket. Modified head squish piston engines can also be made to fit the application on a flathead engine as well as overhead camshaft and two-stroke engines.

=== Modified Block ===
Modified block squish piston engines utilise a space in the block to create a pocket for squishing and combustion to occur. These squish piston engines are otherwise referred to as flat head engines. These types of engines are not very common anymore because of the inherent issues with insufficient air flow into the engine which directly affects the compression ratio. This design is mostly used in small, low cost applications.

=== Modified Piston ===
Modified piston squish piston engines utilise a space in the piston to create an air pocket for squishing and combustion to occur. This is the most common way to create a squish piston engine because it is the smallest and easiest part to manufacture. These pockets can be made by making a recess in the piston crown. This is called a deep bowl piston. Others may use raised areas relative to the piston rings to create a different effect in the combustion chamber. This creates a different type of turbulence that goes down instead of up in the piston itself. To promote turbulence and mixing of the air–fuel mixture, the piston crown must have a recess parallel to the angle that the fuel is injected. It also requires a curve on the outer section of the piston crown. This design directs air from the squish area into the centre of the combustion chamber. This is where the squished air is mixed with the fuel from the injector creating a more evenly mixed air–fuel ratio. However this is only one design for a diesel engine. When looking at engines with more valves and different injector locations there are many different designs that increase the efficiency of the engine. There are also ways to modify the piston and give it intake and exhaust squish areas. This affects how the whole engine runs and the intake and exhaust velocity that in produced.

== Bibliography ==
- Progress Report for Combustion and Emission Control for Advanced CIDI Engines. United States Office of Transportation Technologies, United States Department of Energy
