= Torslandaverken =

Volvo assembly plant near Gothenburg, Sweden

Coordinates: 57°43′25″N 11°50′28″E

The Torslanda Works (or Torslandaverken in Swedish), is one of the largest production facilities of Volvo Cars and is located in Torslanda on the island of Hisingen, about 12 km north west of Gothenburg city centre. The plant marked fifty years of operation on April 24, 2014. under the motto "Increased capacity – for ever-higher quality."

== History ==
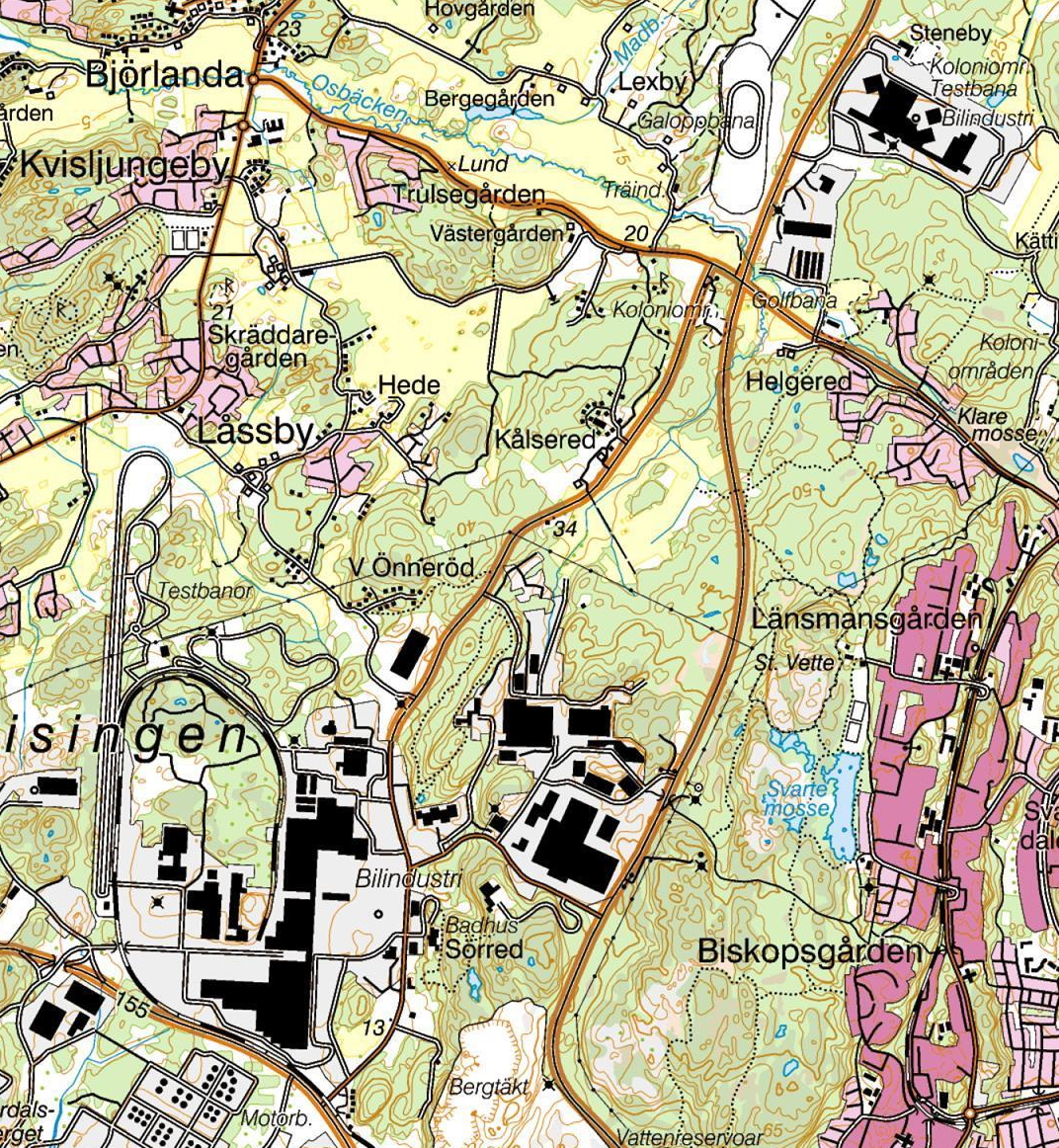
Map of the Torslanda Works (bottom left, with railway spur)

Success and expansion in the latter 1950s led management to begin planning for the Torslanda Plant in 1959 in a rural area that had been intended by city planners as a future industrial use. As well, infrastructure had already been in place, the port and the open sea were nearby, and the city of Göteborg’s airport was also located in Torslanda.

Containing 200,000 square metres of factory floorspace at its inception, production capacity was originally planned at 110,000 cars a year in single-shift operation, with the possibility of increasing to 150,000 cars in two-shift operation. The annual production record from 1973, when 178,000 cars left the factory, still held, as of 2004.

The plant was inaugurated on Friday 24 April 1964, with production beginning in the TA plant (press-shop/body production factory), the TB plant (paintshop) and the TC plant (final assembly). Production on a smaller scale had actually begun in 1962, when approximately a third of the factory was ready to assemble Amazons.

Volvo’s President Gunnar Engellau, Doctor of Engineering Gustav Larson (one of Volvo’s two founders, the other co-founder, Assar Gabrielsson, having died two years before), and Swedish king Gustaf VI Adolf were on hand for the inauguration.

The first car manufactured was an Amazon, while the PV544 was never built in Torslanda. The Volvo 144, and a completely new model, was launched into production in late summer 1966.

Production ceased in Volvo Lundby plant in 1973 with the demise of the Volvo 1800ES. Torslanda production was supported by operations in Canada at Volvo Halifax Assembly and Volvo Kalmar Assembly and later with plants in North America (Chesapeake, Virginia), and later Ghent, Belgium.

Originally employing about 2500 people the plant became Sweden’s largest workplace. Currently, a workforce of about 5000 can produce the current capacity of 170,000 cars. By 1998, the plant received carefully coordinated parts deliveries from the nearby supplier park in Arendal.

By 2014, Volvo Cars successfully completed an expansion of its Torslanda plant in its home town of Gothenburg, Sweden. Volvo uses the Torslanda plant for production of the second generation XC90. The recent expansion included a new body shop that will be used to manufacture the new XC90, which is the first vehicle to ride on Volvo's Scalable Product Architecture and added 24,000 square meters to the plant's footprint, boosting the facility's annual capacity from 200,000 vehicles to 300,000 vehicles.

== Railway access ==
The Torslanda Works is connected to the Swedish national railway network via the Gothenburg Harbour Line (sv:Göteborgs hamnbana), which branches off from the Bohus Line after the Marieholm Bridge (sv:Marieholmsbron).
