= Volvo 262C =

Car model produced by Volvo

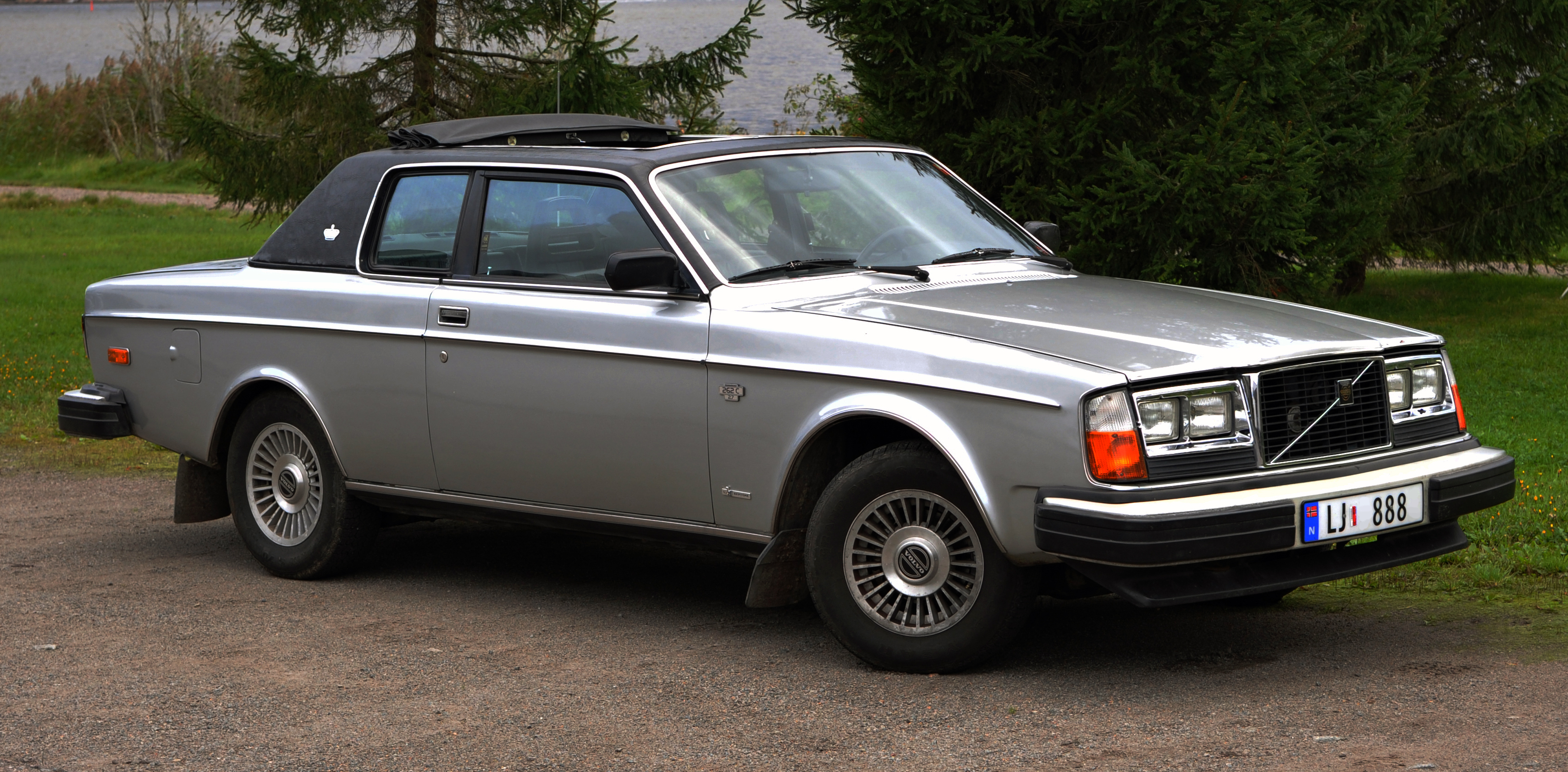
- 1978 Volvo 262C Bertone (with US-spec headlights)

Overview
- Manufacturer: Volvo / Bertone
- Also called: Volvo Coupé
- Production: 1977–1981; 6,622 built
- Model years: 1978–1981
- Assembly: Italy: Turin (Gruppo Bertone)
- Designer: Jan Wilsgaard

Body and chassis
- Class: Mid-size luxury car; Grand tourer
- Body style: 2-door coupé
- Layout: FR layout
- Related: Volvo 260 series

Powertrain
- Engine: 2664 cc B27 (PRV) V6; 2849 cc B28/B280 (PRV) V6
- Transmission: 3-speed automatic; 4-speedmanual

Dimensions
- Wheelbase: 2,640 mm (103.9 in)
- Length: 4,890 mm (192.5 in)
- Width: 1,710 mm (67.3 in)
- Height: 1,440 mm (56.7 in)
- Kerb weight: 1,425–1,440 kg (3,141.6–3,174.7 lb)

Chronology
- Successor: Volvo 780

The Volvo 262C is a luxury coupé made by Volvo from 1977 (as a 1978 model) until 1981. Based on the 264 six-cylinder saloon, the 262C was designed in-house by Volvo's Jan Wilsgaard, and built by Bertone in Turin, Italy.

== Concept and design ==
The 262C was positioned to serve as a halo car for Volvo. The automaker commissioned the Italian industrial design firm Bertone, specializing in car styling and manufacturing. The plan was to assemble 1,200 cars per year, of which 1,000 were for the U.S. market.

The drivetrain, suspension, floor pan, and many of the body panels of the 262C were taken directly from the Volvo 260 four-door sedan, with Bertone building the roof pillars, roof pan, windshield surround, cowl, and upper parts of the doors. The roof of the 262C is about 100 mm (3.9 in) lower than that of the 260 sedans. The chopping had the effect of cramping interior space, and the wide C-pillars made for small-sized rear side windows.

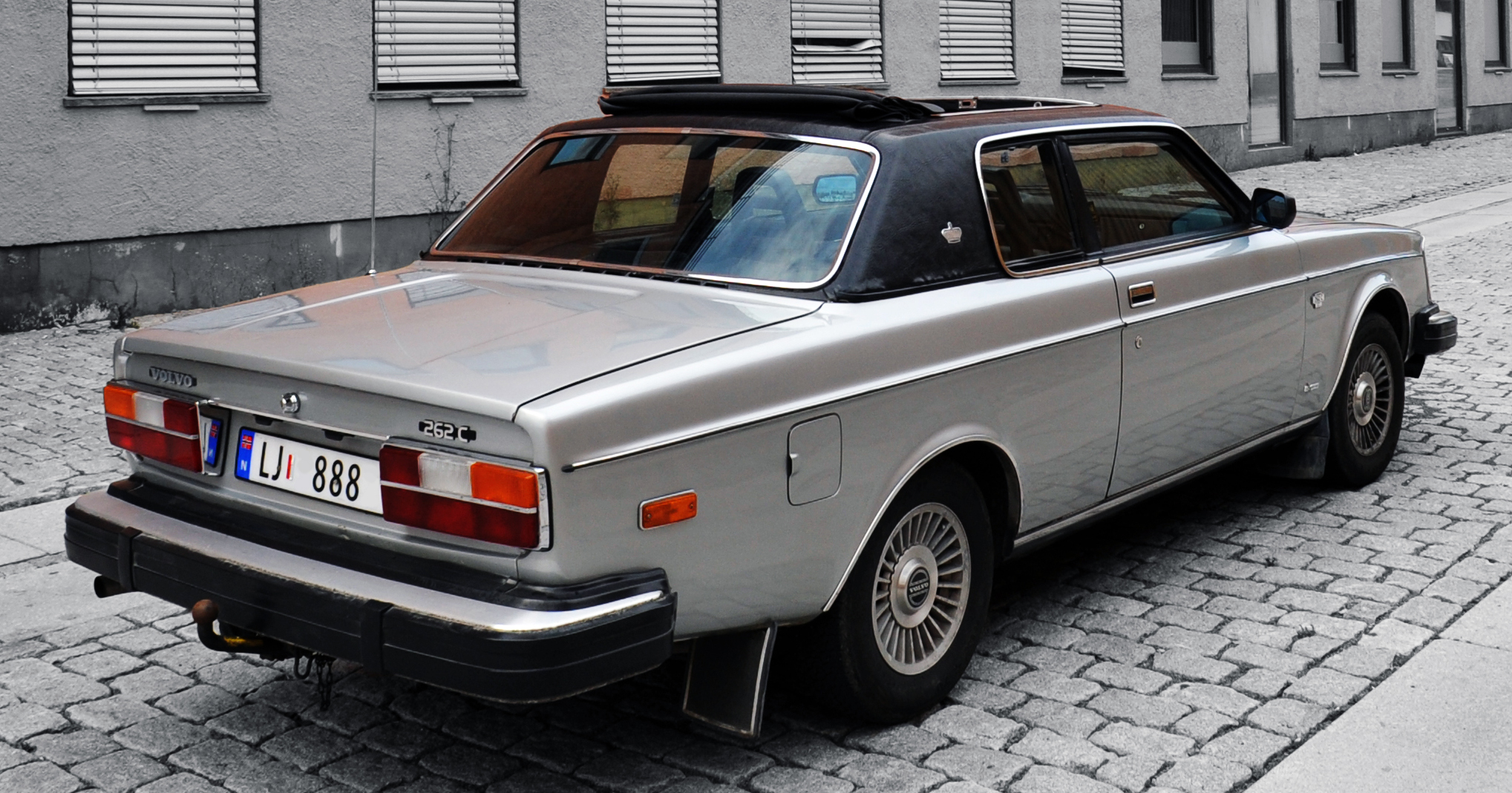
Rear view of a 1978 262C (pre-facelift)

The 262C used the PRV engine, a V6 engine developed jointly by Peugeot, Renault, and Volvo. The engine used a Lambda Sond oxygen sensor system; this was the first use of this system on a production V engine.

Standard equipment included power windows and mirrors, central locking, cruise control, air conditioning, heated front seats, leather interior, alloy wheels, and an electrically powered radio antenna. The only optional extras were a limited-slip differential, a choice of stereos, and the no-cost option of a Borg-Warner three-speed automatic instead of the four-speed manual with electrically operated overdrive. By 1981, the manual transmission option had been discontinued for the U.S. market.

== Reception ==
Aimed mainly at the United States market, the 262C was Volvo's first entry into the luxury car segment. About half of the annual production was earmarked for the United States. It competed against the Cadillac Eldorado and the Mercedes-Benz 280 CE and 300 CD. A total of 6,622 cars were produced from 1978 until 1980.

The model was initially only available in one color combination: silver paint with black vinyl-covered roof. However, other color combinations were available in later years.

Road test by Road & Track magazine described favorable public reaction to the 262C. The journalists detailed the all black leather interior to be of high quality and expected given it was the "priciest Volvo yet ever built" at $15,000. However, lack of headroom was undeniable and the 200-series chassis did not provide the control, comfort, and ride of competitive models such as from Mercedes.

One automobile journalist described the 262C as "the strangely proportioned two-door looks like a chopped diesel locomotive" that "evades the classic ideals of beauty, regardless of the stylistic authorship."

== Annual changes ==
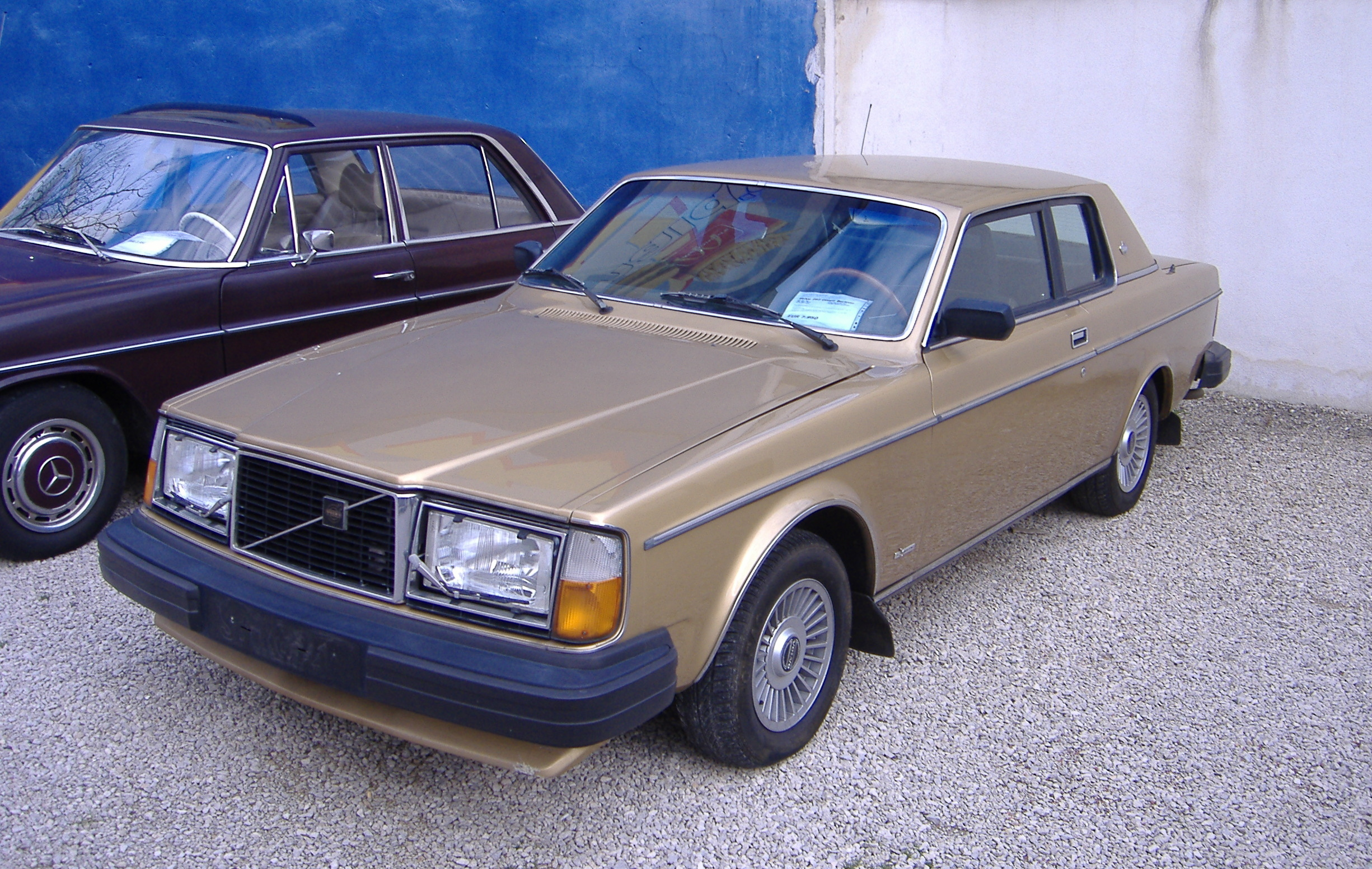
1980 model year Volvo 262C (Europe), without the vinyl roof

For the 1979 model year, the rear-end design was modified with a deeper trunk lid and wrap-around taillights. Upgrades included thermostatic heater controls, and cars with manual transmission included the shift linkage from the 242GT.

The 1980 model year featured an engine displacement increase from 2,664 to 2,849 cc (162.6 to 173.9 cu in) as a result of the bore going from 88 to 91 mm (3.46 to 3.58 in). The engine was also reconfigured, with seven main bearings instead of four and an increase in compression ratio from 8.2:1 to 8.8:1. Also, in 1980, the front air dam from the 242GT was added to the 262C. For North America, the 2.8 L engine was rated at 130 hp (97 kW).

The vinyl roof cover was deleted for the final 1981 model year of production.

== Convertible ==
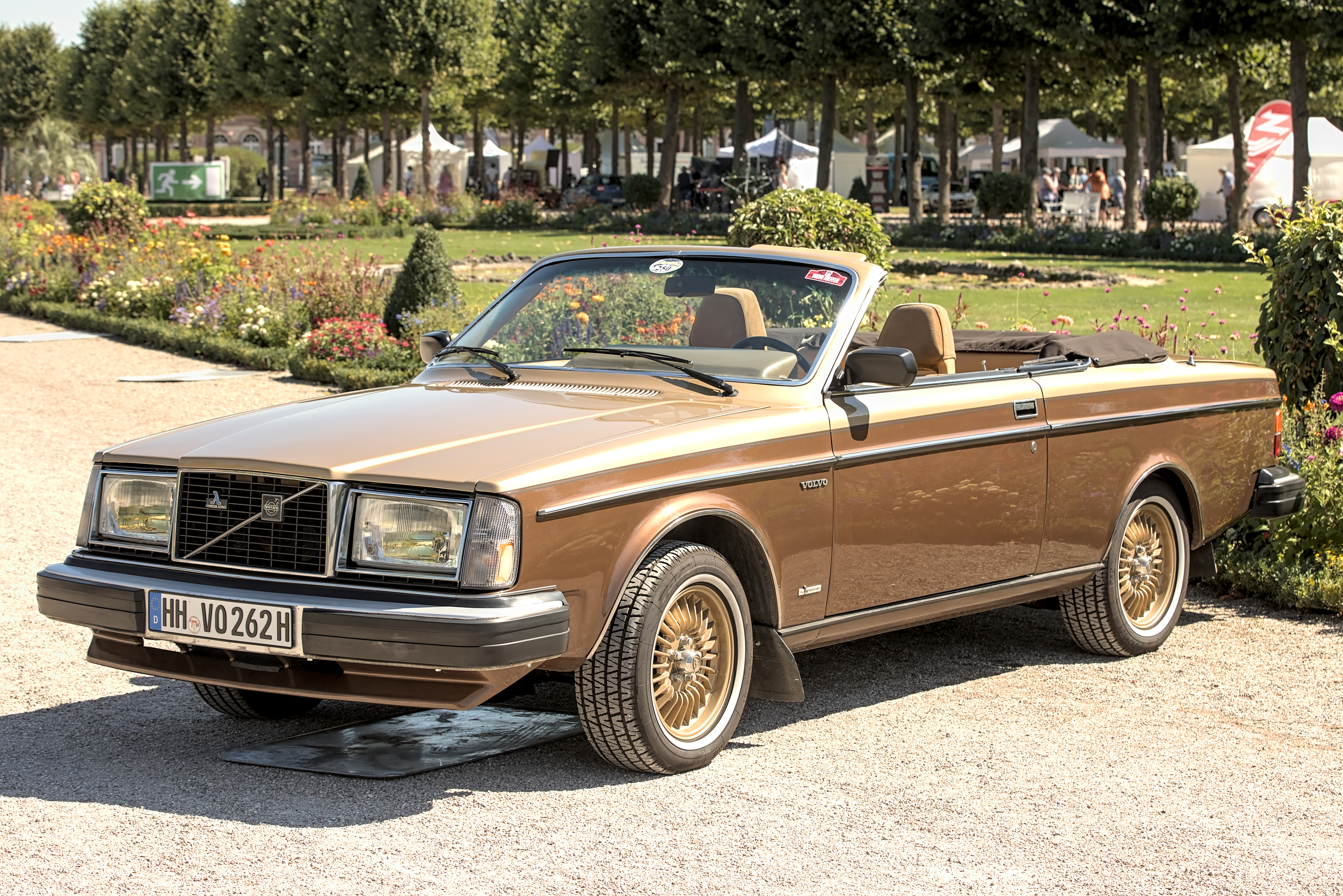
Volvo 262 C Solaire

On the occasion of Volvo's 25th anniversary in the United States, Volvo North America contracted Newport Conversions of Santa Ana, California, to convert the 262C into a convertible. It was destined as a gift to the company CEO. The version was called the 262C Solaire.

Volvo's Swedish headquarters vetoed the project due to safety concerns. Nevertheless, a total of five convertibles were made.
