= Volvo 200 Series =

Range of mid-size cars produced by Volvo from 1974 to 1993

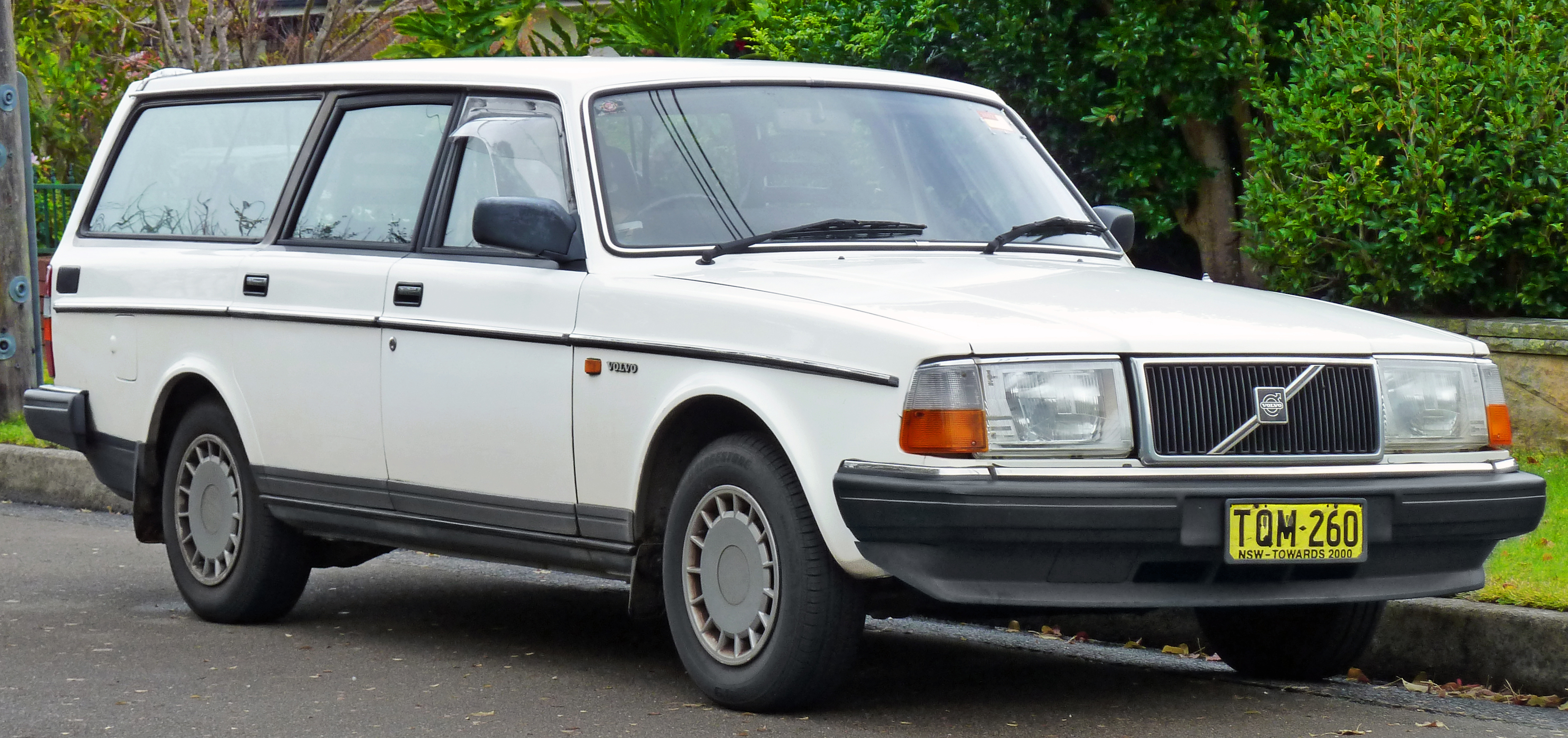
- 1989 Volvo 240 GL station wagon (Australia)

Overview
- Manufacturer: Volvo Cars
- Production: 1974–1993; 2,862,573 produced
- Model years: 1975–1993
- Assembly: Sweden: Torslanda (Torslandaverken); Sweden: Kalmar (VKA); Australia: Clayton (Motor Producers Ltd); Belgium: Ghent (VCG); Canada: Halifax (VHA); Indonesia: North Jakarta (PT. ISMAC); Malaysia: Shah Alam (SMA); Singapore: Jurong (SNM); Thailand: Samut Prakan (TSA)
- Designer: Jan Wilsgaard

Body and chassis
- Class: Mid-size car / Executive car
- Body style: 2/4-door saloon (242/244/262/264); 5-door estate (245/265)
- Layout: Front-engine, rear-wheel-drive
- Platform: Volvo P platform
- Related: Volvo 262C, Volvo 900 series, Volvo 700 series

Powertrain
- Engine: Petrol and diesel engines: Petrol: 1.8 L B17 I4; 2.0 L B20 I4; 2.0 L B19/B200 I4; 2.1 L B21 I4; 2.3 L B23/B230 I4; 2.7 L B27 V6; 2.8 L B28/B280 V6; Diesel: 2.0 L D20 I5; 2.4 L D24 I6
- Transmission: 4-speed manual; 4-speed manual with overdrive; 5-speed manual; 3-speed automatic; 4-speed automatic

Dimensions
- Wheelbase: 104.3 in (2,649 mm)
- Length: 189.9–190.7 in (4,823–4,844 mm)
- Width: 67.3–67.7 in (1,709–1,720 mm)
- Height: 56.3–57.5 in (1,430–1,460 mm)

Chronology
- Predecessor: 240: Volvo 140 Series; 260: Volvo 164
- Successor: 240: Volvo 940; 260: Volvo 760

The Volvo 200 Series (designated internally as the 240 and 260 models) was a range of mid-size cars manufactured by Swedish automaker Volvo Cars from 1974 to 1993. Designed by Jan Wilsgaard, the series was developed from the Volvo 140 Series and incorporated safety innovations from Volvo's VESC experimental safety vehicle program.

The 200 Series was produced in sedan, station wagon, and limited convertible body styles. Over 2.8 million units were manufactured during its 19-year production run, making it one of Volvo's most successful model lines. The series established Volvo's reputation for safety and durability, with many examples remaining in service decades after production ended.

Production overlapped with the introduction of the Volvo 700 Series in 1982. While the 260 Series was discontinued in 1984 and replaced by the 700 Series, the popular 240 model continued production until 1993. The final 240 was manufactured on 14 May 1993, concluding nearly two decades of production.

== History ==
The Volvo 240 and 260 series were introduced in the autumn of 1974, and was initially available as six variations of the 240 Series (242L, 242DL, 244DL, 244GL, 245L and 245DL) and two variations of the 260 Series (264DL and 264GL). The 240 Series was available as a sedan (with two or four doors) or a station wagon, however, the 260 Series was available as a coupé (262C Bertone), two-door sedan, four-door sedan, or station wagon. The 200 looked much like the earlier 140 and 164, they shared the same basic body shell and were largely identical from the cowl rearward. However, the 200 incorporated many of the features and design elements tried in the Volvo VESC ESV in 1972, which was a prototype experiment in car safety. The overall safety of the driver and passengers in the event of a crash was greatly improved with very large front and rear end crumple zones. Another main change was the new engines offered, which were of an overhead cam design based on the earlier B20. The 260 series also received a V6 engine in lieu of the 164's inline-six.

The 200 Series had MacPherson strut-type front suspension, which increased room around the engine bay, while the rear suspension was a modified version of that fitted to the 140 Series. The steering was greatly improved with the introduction of rack-and-pinion steering, with power steering fitted as standard to the 244GL, 264DL and 264GL, and there were some modifications made to the braking system (in particular the master cylinder).

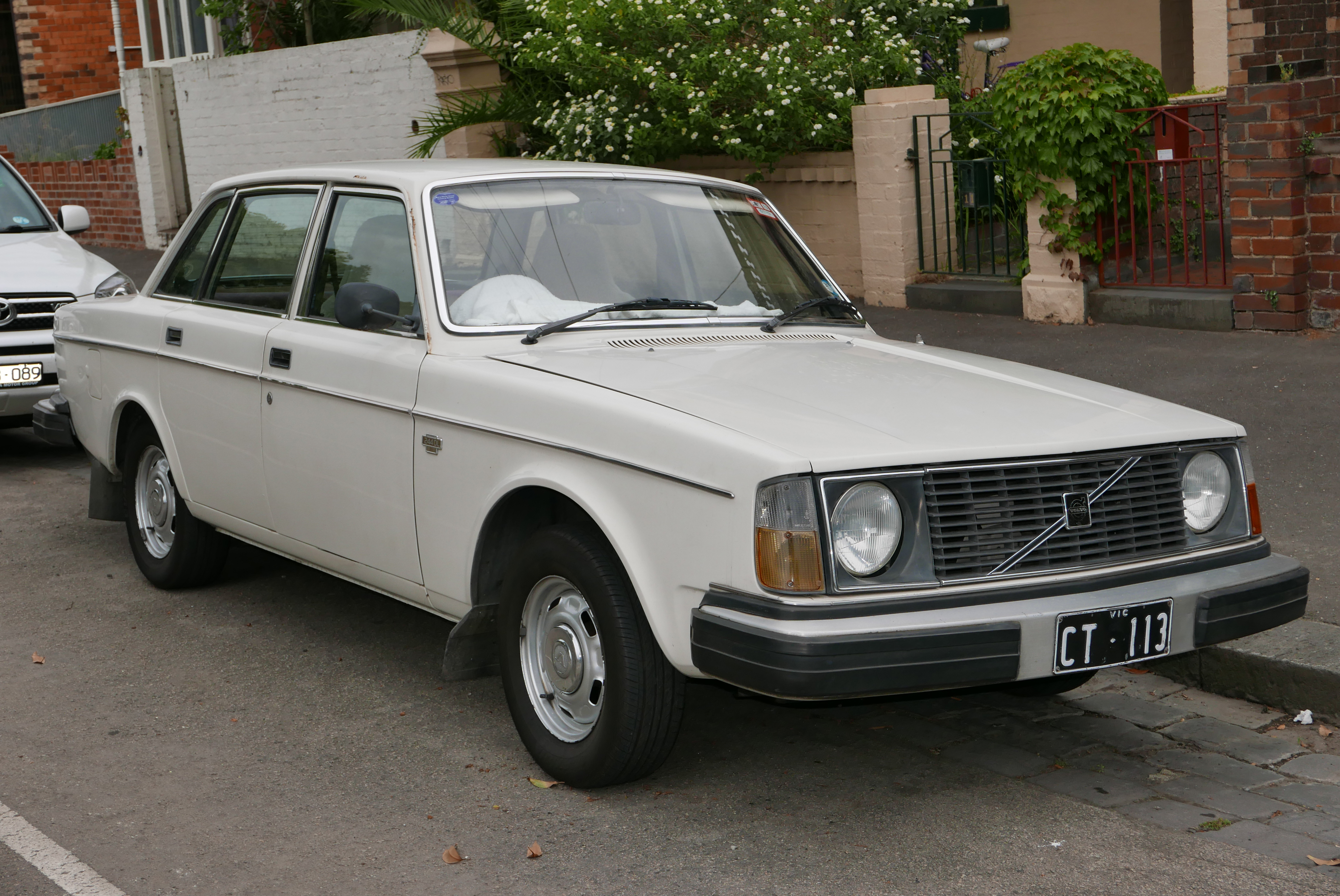
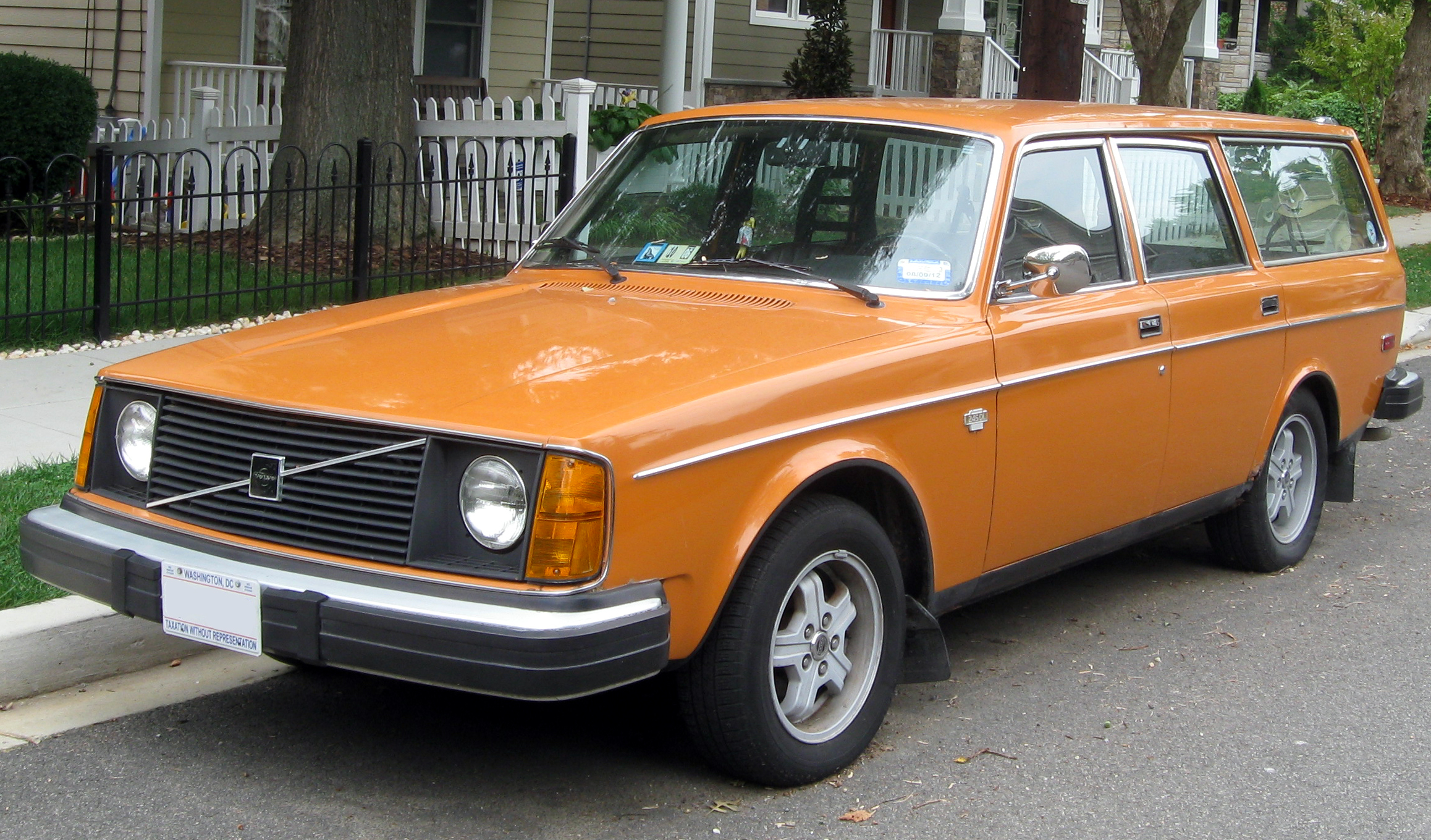
First-generation 240s in international (Australian 1978 244 DL saloon, left) and North American (US-spec 1975 245 DL estate, right) versions. The international version has white parking lamps and larger headlamps; the American version has side markers.

The front end of the car was also completely restyled with a "shovel nose" which closely resembled that of the VESC prototype vehicle – that being the most obvious change which made the 200 Series distinguishable from the earlier 140 and 160 Series. Other than all the changes mentioned above, the 200 Series was almost identical to the 140 and 160 Series from the bulkhead to the very rear end. In 1978, a facelift meant a redesigned rear end for sedans, with wraparound taillights and a trunk opening with a lower lip. The dashboard was derived from the safety fascia introduced for the 1973 model year 100 Series – the main change for the 200 Series was the adoption of slatted "egg crate" style air vents in place of the eyeball style vents used in the 140/160 and the square clock. All models were available with a choice of four-speed manual or a three-speed automatic transmission. Overdrive was also optional on the manual 244GL, while a five-speed manual gearbox was optional on the 264GL and 265GL.

In the autumn of 1975 (for the 1976 model year in America), the 265 DL estate became available alongside the existing range, and this was the first production Volvo estate to be powered by a six-cylinder engine. The choice of gearboxes was also improved, with overdrive now available as an option in all manual models except the base-model 242L and 245L. As before, a three-speed automatic was optional in every model. The B21A engine gained three horsepower; a new steering wheel and gearknob were also introduced.

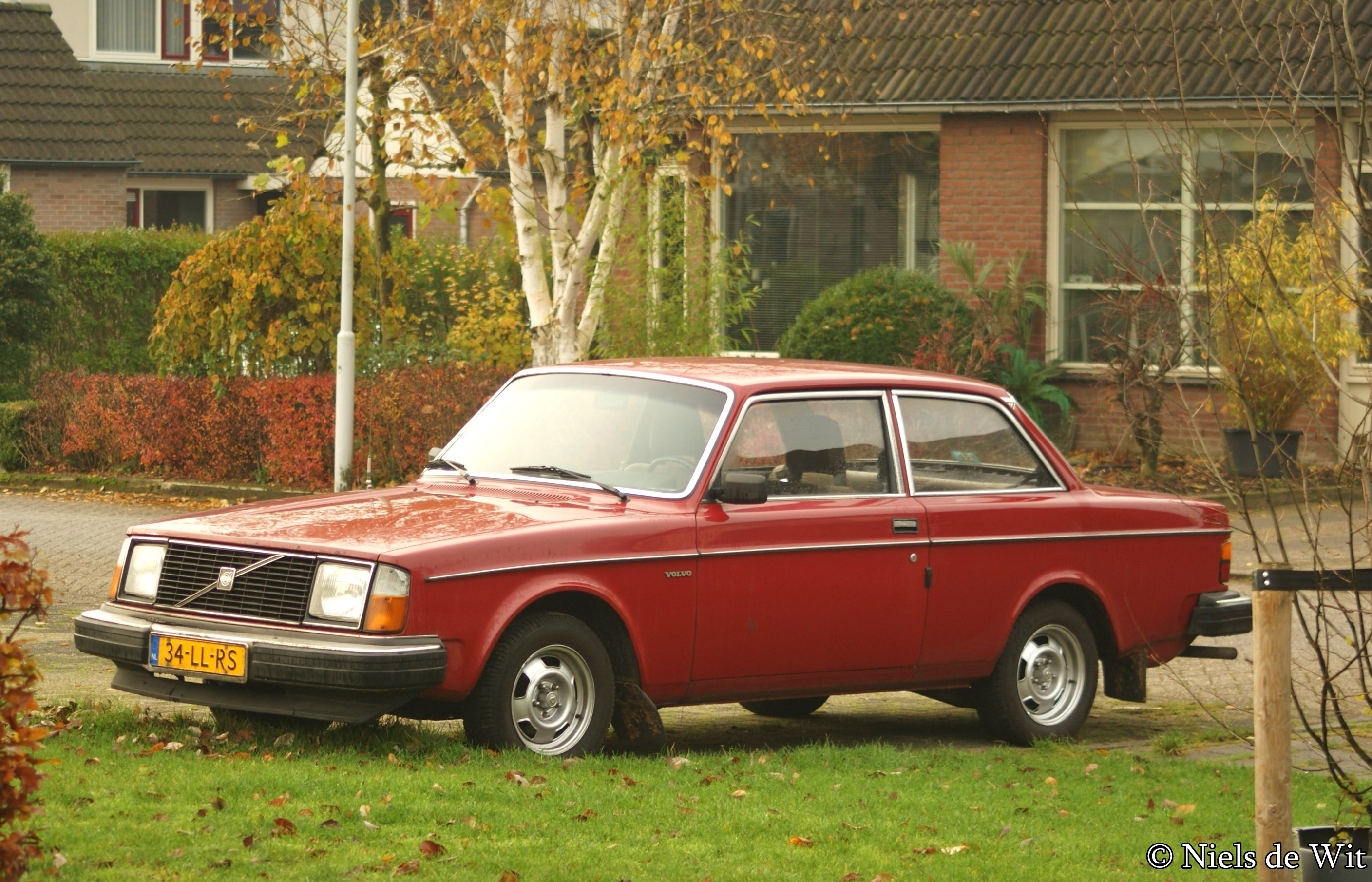
European-specification 1979–1980 two-door 242 DL saloon

At the 1976 Paris Motor Show Bertone first showed the stretched 264 TE, a seven-seat limousine on a 3,430 mm (135.0 in) wheelbase, although it had entered production earlier. The raw bodies were sent from Sweden to Grugliasco for lengthening, reinforcing, and finishing. Carl XVI Gustav of Sweden used one, as did much of East Germany's political leadership.

For 1977 the B19A engine with 90 PS (66 kW) replaced the B20A in most markets, although the old pushrod type soldiered on for another two years in some places. This is also the year that the sportier 242 GT arrived.

In 1978 the grille was altered, now with a chrome surround. Rear view mirrors were now black, while the front seats were changed as were the emblems, while interval wipers were introduced. 1978 models were also the first 240s to receive a new paint formula, to help solve the severe rust problems in previous model years.

The 1979 model year brought a full facelift front and rear, the most obvious change being the adoption of flush fitting square headlamps on the DL or rectangular headlamps on the GL, GLE in place of the recessed circular units. The sedans received new wraparound rear lamp clusters and a restyled leading edge to the trunk lid, while the rear of the wagons remained unchanged. The GLE was added while the L was cancelled, and the six-cylinder diesel arrived late in the year. For 1980, the sporty GLT arrived, replacing the GT. For 1981 there was yet another new grille, while the station wagons received new, wraparound taillights. The B21A gained some four horsepower, now 106 PS (78 kW), while the carburetted B23A with 112 PS (82 kW) was introduced in some markets. The Turbo arrived, while six-cylinder models now had a more powerful 2.8-liter engine. 1981 also saw the dashboard altered significantly, which a much larger binnacle in order to bring the radio and clock within the driver's line of sight. The instrument pod itself, which had been unaltered since the 1973 model year 100 Series, was also redesigned.

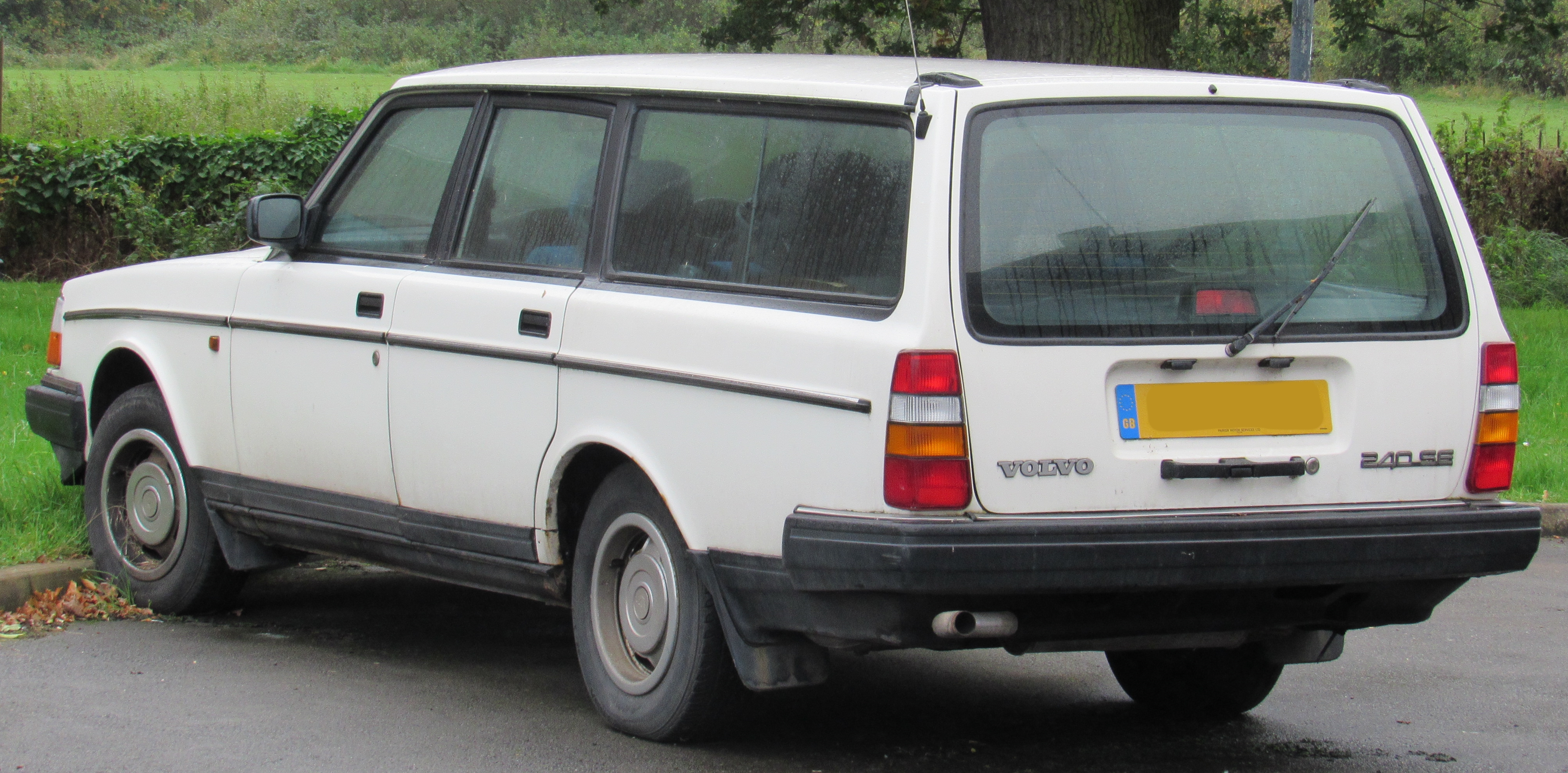
1993 Volvo 240 SE estate (UK)

Incremental improvements were made almost every year of the production run. One of the major improvements was the introduction of the oxygen sensor in North America in late 1976 (1977 models), which Volvo called Lambda Sond and developed in conjunction with Bosch. It added a feedback loop to the Jetronic fuel injection system already in use, which allowed fine-tuning of the air and fuel mixture and therefore produced superior emissions, drivability and fuel economy.

For the 1983 model year, Volvo dropped the DL and GLE labels, selling the cars simply as 240s. In the domestic Swedish market, the 240 could be had with a 2.1- or 2.3-liter engine (more options were available in export), but the bigger engine always came coupled with a five-speed transmission and tinted windows. The 1983s also received wider side trim and all models had the larger taillights introduced on the previous year's GLT model. A B23E-engined GLE variant was also added (not available with two doors). Buyers protested against the lack of grades and they returned for 1984. A new manual gearbox also arrived for 1984, while a four-speed automatic option was available in the GL. The GLT and Turbo versions received a taller grille.

While Volvo had been planning to discontinue the 200-series since the early 1980s, the design kept selling well and Volvo provided steady updates. In late 1991, for the 1992 model year, it received 160 detail improvements including changes to the heater controls, heated rear view mirrors, and revised front seats. For the final, 1993 model year, air conditioning units were upgraded to use R-134a rather than the ozone-depleting R-12 (Freon).

About one-third of all 240s sold were station wagons, which featured very large cargo space of 41 cubic feet (1.2 m^{3}). They could be outfitted with a rear-facing foldable jumpseat in the passenger area, making the wagon a seven-passenger vehicle. The jumpseat came with three-point seat belts, and wagons were designed to have a reinforced floor section, protecting the occupants of the jumpseat in the event of a rear-end collision.

A 1993 Volvo 240DL was driven by IKEA founder Ingvar Kamprad, who stopped driving it when he was told the car was too dangerous due to outdated safety design two decades later.

The last regular 200 series car produced was a blue station wagon built to Italian "Polar Italia" specifications, displayed at the Volvo World Museum. It was manufactured on the 14th May 1993. To round off the production, Volvo produced one shortened two door station wagon, to symbolize shortened leadtimes. The car was white, with the text "KORTA LEDTIDER" (Swedish for "short leadtimes") on the doors.

== Engines ==
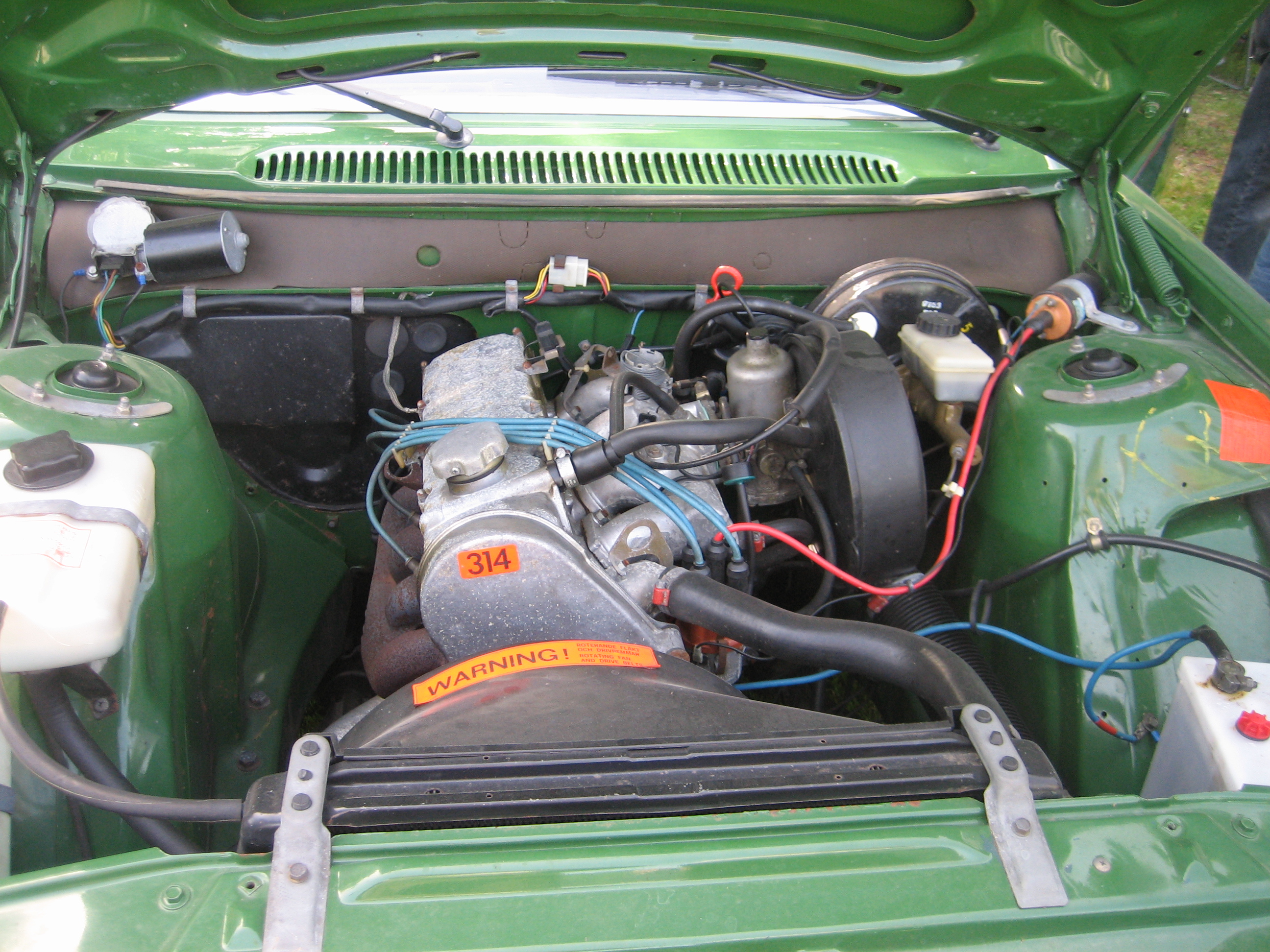
B21A engine in a 1970s Volvo 240, showing single side draft carburetor

The 200 series was offered with three families of engines. Most 240s were equipped with Volvo's own red block, 2.0–2.3-liter four-cylinder engines. Both overhead valve and overhead cam versions of the red block engines were installed in 240s. The B20 was used only in the early years and subsequently replaced by the B19, a smaller version of the B21. Power of the carburetted versions increased for the 1979 model year. V6 engines were also available, first in the 260-models, but also later in the GLE- and GLT-versions of 240. Known as the PRV family, they were developed in a three-way partnership among Volvo, Peugeot and Renault, 240 diesel models are powered by diesel engines purchased from Volkswagen. In Greece and Israel the 1.8-liter B17 engine was available beginning with the 1980 model year (also as a luxuriously equipped 260). This smaller twin-carb engine developed 90 PS (66 kW), and had considerably higher fuel consumption than even the turbocharged top version.

The 1974 240 series retained the B20A inline-four engine from the 140 Series in certain markets, with the new B21A engine available as an option on the 240 DL models. The new B21 engine was a 2,127 cc, four-cylinder unit, which had a cast-iron block, a five-bearing crankshaft, and a belt-driven overhead camshaft. This engine produced 97 PS (71 kW) for the B21A carburettor 242DL, 244DL and 245DL, and 123 PS (90 kW) for the B21E fuel-injected 244GL. The carburetted B19A also produced 97 PS (71 kW), although at 5400 rpm, while the fuel injected B19E claimed 117 PS (86 kW).

=== North American inline-fours ===
The OHV B20F engine was carried over to the new 200-Series when they went on sale in the United States and Canada for the 1975 and 1976 model years. No carbureted engines were available until 1977 when Canada went metric.

With the tightening emission regulations in the United States, the new OHC B21F with fuel injection and EGR system replaced B20F for the 1976 model year. Lambda-Sond and the three-way catalytic converter became available in 1977 on California emissions vehicles only. In 1980, 49 state cars also received Lambda-Sond. The Canadian market had both carbureted B21A (again as a base engine from 1977 to 1984) and fuel-injected B21F engines. The B21F engine was revised with higher compression flat-top pistons in 1979 for increased output to 107 SAE hp or 80 kW (109 PS; 107 bhp). The Bosch LH-Jetronic fuel injection system replaced the K-Jetronic on certain B21F engines in 1982, sharing less part commonality with the turbocharged B21FT engine.

The B21 was enlarged to 2.3 liters and renamed as B23E for the Canadian market only with a K grind camshaft in 1981 and B23F for both markets in 1983. The B23E with higher compression ratio used the mechanical K-Jetronic and wasn't fitted with catalytic converter. In 1983, the B23E received an A grind camshaft from the B21A engine and switched to the normal B21F style head from the higher performance 405 casting used on the older B23E engines. Compression ratio was bumped up from 10.0:1 to 10.3:1. Horsepower dropped to 115 SAE hp from 136 DIN hp (127 SAE). The B23F used LH-Jetronic system and catalytic converter. All early 1983 B23F engines had the same compression ratio as the 1983 B23E, but, due to Chrysler ignition system usage, provided only 107 hp. After the switch to a Bosch distributor and coil, horsepower went up to 114 hp for the high compression B23F. In mid-1983, a lower compression B23F was introduced that had less horsepower (111 hp), but more torque (136 ft.lbs versus 133 ft.lbs, produced at 2750 rpm, instead of 3500 rpm). That version was used on M46-equipped cars only.

B21FT, the first turbocharged engine from Volvo, was added to the 200-Series in late 1980 for the 1981 model year. The output was increased to 126 hp SAE (94 kW; 128 PS). Like the european B21ET, the B21FT used the K-Jetronic mechanical fuel injection system, but with Lambda-Sond and catalytic converter added. In 1982, the horsepower was increased to 127 hp SAE (95 kW; 129 PS). With some modifications to the fuel system, horsepower was increased to 131 hp SAE (98 kW; 133 PS) in 1984. The turbocharged engine did not have the intercooler until 1983 when the optional extra-cost "intercooler boost system" (IBS) was offered. The IBS became standard equipment in mid-1984. Despite the introduction of the new B23 engine, B21FT engine was never enlarged to 2.3 liters.

Starting in 1983, certain Canadian models received the same B23F engines fitted to the US models (49-state emission regulations) and the B21FT (conformed to the California emission regulations).

In 1985, the B21A was dropped, and the new B230F engine was introduced for use in all non-turbo 240s in both markets. Had a 9.8:1 compression ratio, instead of 10.3:1 for the earlier B23F in automatic and early 1983 manual form, or 9.5:1 for late 1983 through 1984 manual form. It had the higher horsepower number of the automatic B23F, 114 hp SAE net (85 kW; 116 PS), and the higher torque number of the low compression manual B23F (136 foot-pounds). Fuel system was, again, LH-Jetronic, but updated to 2.2, which used a different mass airflow sensor and computers. It also was redesigned to be lower-friction than the earlier B21 and B23 engines with lighter weight connecting rods and pistons that had a shorter skirt. In 1989, the B230F received the Bosch LH-Jetronic version 2.4 fuel injection system, which added OBD-1 onboard diagnostics. The ignition system was similarly updated from the Volvo/Chrysler ignition system that used a Bosch coil and distributor to the Bosch EZK-116K system. Some manual 1990–93 B230F engines used the LH-Jetronic 3.1 system, which used a heated film mass airflow sensor, instead of the usual hot wire sensor.

=== Six-cylinder PRV ===
The 260 models had a completely new 90-degree V6 B27E engine, sometimes called the "Douvrin". This engine was developed jointly by Peugeot, Renault and Volvo in collaboration, and is therefore generally known as the "PRV engine". This engine was unusual at the time, being composed of many small parts in a modular design (as opposed to a monolithic engine block and head). The B27E engine has a displacement of 2,664 cc, an aluminium alloy block, and wet cylinder liners. This engine produces 140 bhp (100 kW) for both the 264DL and 264GL. In fuel-injected form, the B27F was introduced to the US in the 1976 260 series. The two-door 262 DL and GL sedans, the 264DL saloon (sedan) and the new 265DL estate (station wagon) were offered outside North America with the B27A engine. Almost identical to the fuel-injected V6 B27E engine, it has an SU carburettor instead of fuel injection, and therefore it produces a lower output of 125 PS (92 kW). The PRV engine (B27E in 1980, B28E 1981–1984) was also used in 244/245 GLT6 on several markets as an option until 1984.

Volvo increased engine displacement to 2.8 liters in 1980 with the introduction of the B28E and B28F, which were prone to top-end oiling troubles and premature camshaft wear. Some export markets also received the lower output carburetted B28A engine with 129 PS (95 kW) at 5,250 rpm, capable of running on lower-octane fuel. Volvo also installed the B28 V6 in their new 760 model and the engine was used by numerous other manufacturers in the 1970s and 1980s. The updated B280 engine used in the final years of the 760 and 780 models did not suffer from the same premature camshaft wear as the earlier PRV engines. In North America, the 260 series was only available with a three-speed automatic transmission or a five-speed manual transmission with electronic overdrive and an engine output of 130 hp (97 kW).

=== VW diesels ===
Announced at the 1978 Paris Motor Show, the Volvo 240 GL D6 was introduced in the spring of 1979. Volvo's new diesel engine was purchased from Volkswagen and was a six-cylinder iteration of the ones installed in diesel Volkswagen and Audi vehicles at the time. Production was initially low, with only around 600 built by the time of the introduction of the 1980 model year cars. A turbocharged diesel was never sold in the 200 series. At the time of introduction, the six-cylinder Volvo was one of the fastest as well as quietest diesels sold. These engines are all liquid-cooled, pre-combustion chamber, diesel engines with non-sleeved iron blocks and aluminum heads. A Bosch mechanical injection system is used that requires constant electrical input so that the fuel supply can be cut off when the ignition key is removed.

A 2.4-liter inline-six (the D24) and a 2.0-liter inline-five (the D20) were available, producing 82 PS (60 kW) and 68 PS (50 kW) respectively. The lesser D20 engine was the same as installed in the contemporary Audi 100; it was only sold in select markets where it was favoured by the tax structures. Most D5s went to Finland but it was also marketed in Italy between 1979 and 1981. By 1985 the D6 had replaced the D5 in Finland as well. The D5 was very slow, much slower than the D6 or the Audi 100 with the same five-cylinder engine, reaching 100 km/h from a standing start in 24.4 seconds. The D5 used the same four-speed manual transmission as the D6 but coupled to the lower-geared rear axle also used in 2-liter petrol cars; this meant that fuel consumption figures were only marginally better than those of the larger diesel while noise levels increased noticeably. In Finland, the price difference with the equal six-cylinder diesel was only just over two percent; owners expected to save money by being in much lower tax and insurance brackets.

The diesel had originally been intended to be sold North America first and foremost, but in actuality the D24 only became available in the North American market beginning with the 1980 model year. After the US diesel market collapsed, sales decreased to ever smaller numbers and it was discontinued after the 1985 model year. No diesels were actually delivered during 1980 as Volvo had a hard time meeting the EPA's environmental standards. The federalized diesel developed a claimed 78 hp (58 kW; 79 PS), but was not certified for sale in California.

== Badges ==
=== Nomenclature ===
The 200-series cars were identified initially by badges on their trunk lid or rear hatch in a manner similar to the system used for previous models. The 4 and 6 codes soon lost their original meaning as signifying the number of cylinders with the introduction of B17-engined four-cylinder Volvo 260s for export to Greece and Israel in the late 1970s. There was also a six-cylinder 240 GLT in some markets, as well as both six- and five-cylinder diesels labelled 240. The second digit now only denoted how luxurious the car was. By June 1982, with the introduction of the model year 1983 Volvos, the third digit too lost its meaning and the 242/244/245 became simply the 240.

- 1974–1982: three digits (in the format 2XY, where X usually represents the number of cylinders and Y represents the doors: 2 for coupés, 4 for sedans, 5 for station wagons) followed by trim level letters. For example; 244 and 245 were four-cylinder sedans and wagons respectively and 264 and 265 six-cylinder sedans and wagons respectively.
- 1983–1993: 240 (or 260 until 1985) followed by trim level letters (third digit no longer reflects body style, although it is reflected in the engine compartment label, as well as on the label in the trunk on sedans or under the main cargo compartment storage lid on wagons). Special models (e.g. Polar and Torslanda) sometimes omit the 240.

For the American market:

- 1975–1979: trim level letters preceded by three digits (in the format 2XY, where X usually represents the number of cylinders and Y represents the doors: 2 for coupés (only for the 262C. 242 are two-door sedans), 4 for sedans, 5 for station wagons)
- 1980–1985: trim level letters. A small number of four-cylinder 260s were produced, namely the 1980–1981 GL sedan, which could either be a 240 or a 260. Additionally, diesel 240s have six-cylinder engines.
- 1986–1993: 240 followed by trim level letters (third digit no longer reflects body style), although it is reflected in the engine compartment label, as well as on the label in the trunk on sedans or under the main cargo compartment storage lid on wagons.

==== Trim levels ====
Throughout the 200-series' production, different levels of luxury were available for purchase. The specific trim level designations ranged from the 242/244/245 L, being the least expensive, to the highest specification 264/265 GLE saloon and estate models respectively. The actual equipment and availability of a particular trim level varied depending on the market. The letters normally appear on the trunk lid or rear hatch of the car (except for during MY1983) and had originally represented the following, although by the 1980s the letter codes had officially lost any underlying meaning:

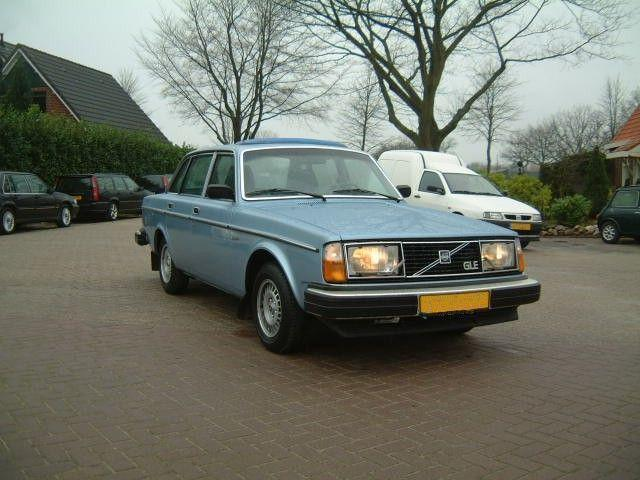
1979–1980 European-spec 244 GLE sedan

- L (Luxe) Typical for early work vans
- DL (de Luxe)
- GL (Grand Luxe)
- GLE (Grand Luxe Executive)
- GLT (Grand Luxe Touring)
- GT (Only 2-door sedans, "242" )
- Turbo (Offered from 1981. Mostly equivalent to GLT trim, called "GLT Turbo" in the US)

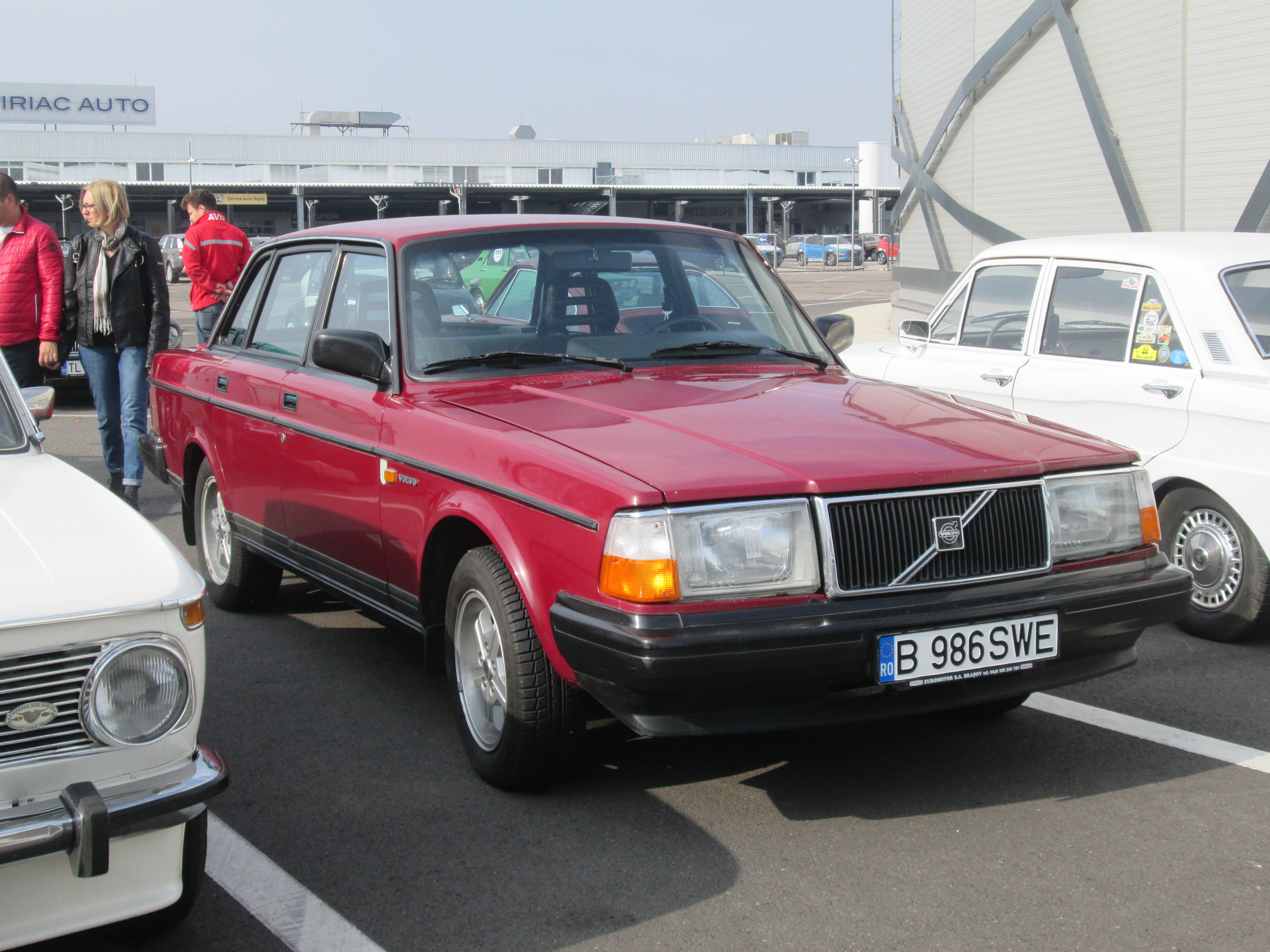
European-spec 1986 Volvo 244 GL

==== Engine type ====
Sometimes, the engine type of a car was also designated by badging. In some instances, these badges were omitted, replaced trim level badges, or even used in combination with them:

- Turbo (a separate trim level, similar to GLT – 1981–83 models also had GLT Turbo models)
- Diesel (had most GL features, but some omissions)
- Injection (indicating K-Jetronic fuel injection in certain markets)
- Katalysator (indicating a catalytic converter in Scandinavia and the German market)

== 200 Series specifications ==
- Produced: 1974–1993
- Production volume: 2,862,573
- Body style: 4-door sedan (1974–1993), 2-door coupe (1974–1984), 5-door station wagon (1974–1993)
- Engine configurations included:
  - B20 four-cylinder inline OHV
  - B17, B19, B21, B23, B200, B230 four-cylinder inline OHC
  - B19ET, B21ET, B21FT four-cylinder inline OHC turbo (intercooled with factory installed IBS – intercooler boost system kit or Volvo R-Sport dealer retrofitting kit for 1981-early 1984 models starting in mid-1983.)
  - B27, B28 V6 OHC
  - D20 five-cylinder inline OHC diesel (1979–circa 1984)
  - D24 six-cylinder inline OHC diesel (1979–1993)
- Transmissions: Volvo offered various transmissions depending on the year, model, market, and engine combinations including the:
  - M40 (4-speed manual, 1975 only)
  - M41 (4-speed manual with electrical overdrive, 1975 only, coupe and sedan only)
  - M45 (4-speed manual)
  - M46 (4-speed manual with electrical overdrive)
  - M47 (5-speed manual)
  - BW35, BW55 or AW55 (3-speed automatic)
  - AW70 or AW71 (4-speed automatic with 3 direct + OD)
- Brakes: hydraulic, disc brakes on all four wheels
  - Front: four opposed piston calipers with either solid or (later) vented rotors
  - Rear: twin piston calipers utilizing solid rotors and integral parking brake drums
  - Triangulated braking circuits on non-ABS cars with both front calipers and one rear caliper per circuit. ABS cars used normal diagonal split braking system.
- Standard safety features
  - Driver airbag (from 1990 in the US only; optional on 1990–1991 Canadian models, standard 1992–1993)
  - Anti-lock braking system (ABS) (optional 1991–1992, standard 1993 in US)
- Dimensions:
  - Wheelbase: 2,649.22 mm (104.3 in)
  - Length (Europe):
    - 1975–1980: 489 cm (192.5 in)
    - 1981–1993: 479 cm (188.6 in)
  - Length (US/Canada):
    - 1975–1982: 489 cm (192.5 in) – 1975–1985 Cdn 240)
    - 1983–1985 US: 479 cm (188.6 in)
    - 1986–1993 US/Cdn: 484.378 cm (190.7 in)
  - Weight: 2,840 lb (1,288.2 kg) (1989 US spec 240, fully fueled, no driver)

== Market differences ==
=== European/Australian market ===
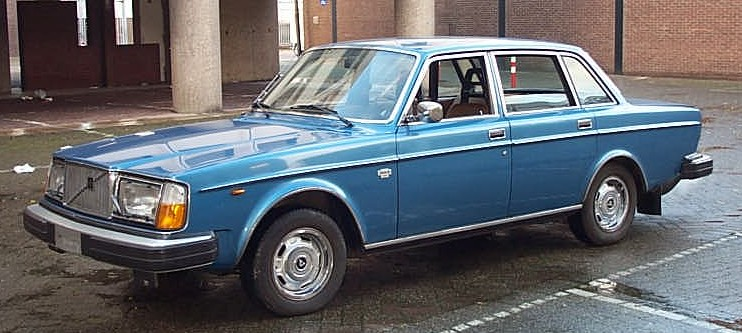
European-spec 1975–1980 264 GL sedan

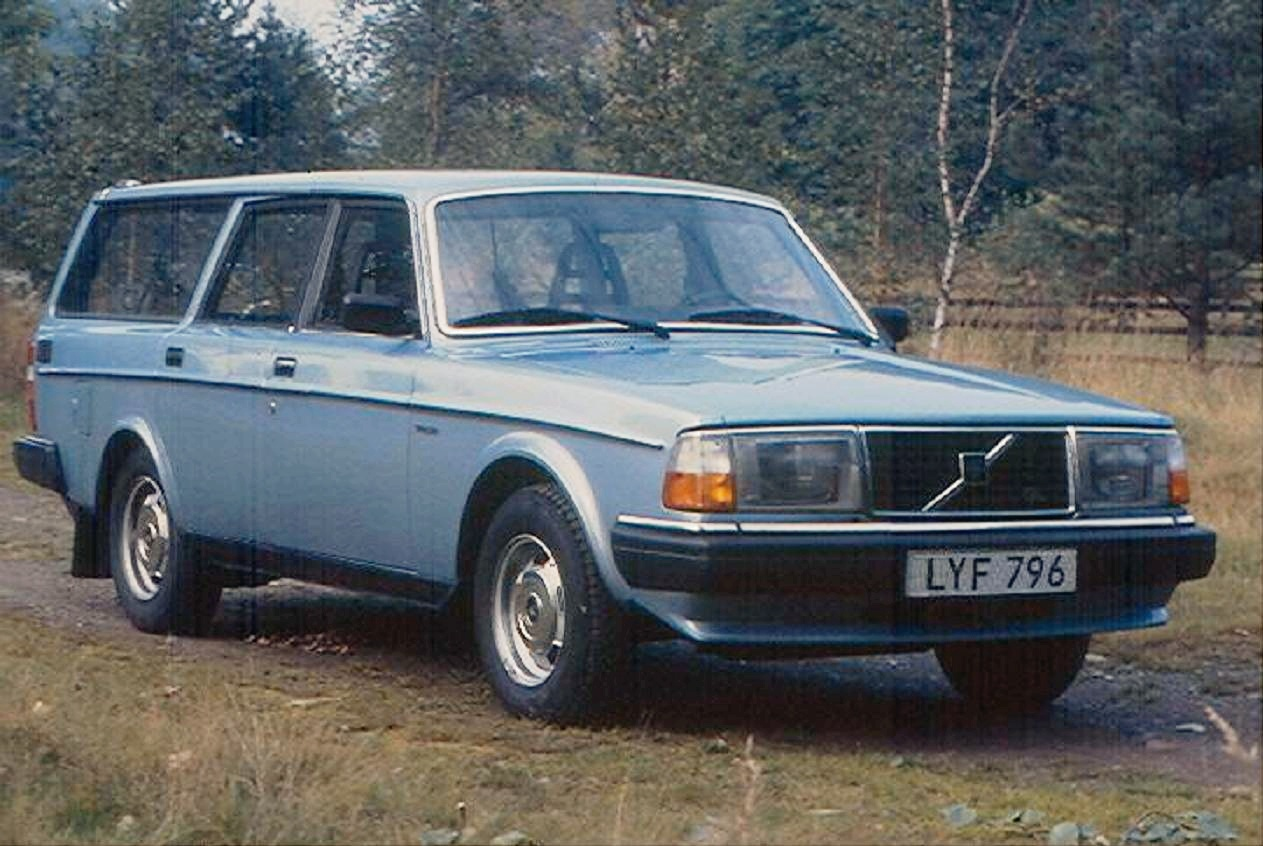
European-spec 245 GL estate, 1981–82 model; Scandinavia: 1981–84

- Glass-lens headlamps compliant with international ECE headlighting standards, 1974–1993
- Fender-mounted side turn signal repeaters introduced various years in different European markets per local regulations; worldwide except North America starting in 1984, Australia starting in 1989
- Daytime running lamps implemented by a second, bright 21W filament in the parking lamp bulbs, introduced mid-1970s in Scandinavia and the UK, and in some other markets outside North America in the early 1980s
- White parking lamps (with white front turning signals for Italian market until 1977)
- Aspheric sideview mirrors from the 1980 model year (originally not for the DL)
- Diesel engine available (except Australia) from 1979 to 1993

For 1980, the 240 GT and GLE were dropped from most markets, as well as the 265 GLE. In the UK and Australia the 265 GLE was available until 1985 (now badged "260"). The new GLT model which replaced GT and GLE had the GT's 140 PS (103 kW) fuel injected 2.3-liter engine with manual transmission (sedan only), or the 260's 2.7-liter V6 with 141 PS (104 kW) in station wagons or in automatic-equipped sedans.

=== North American market ===
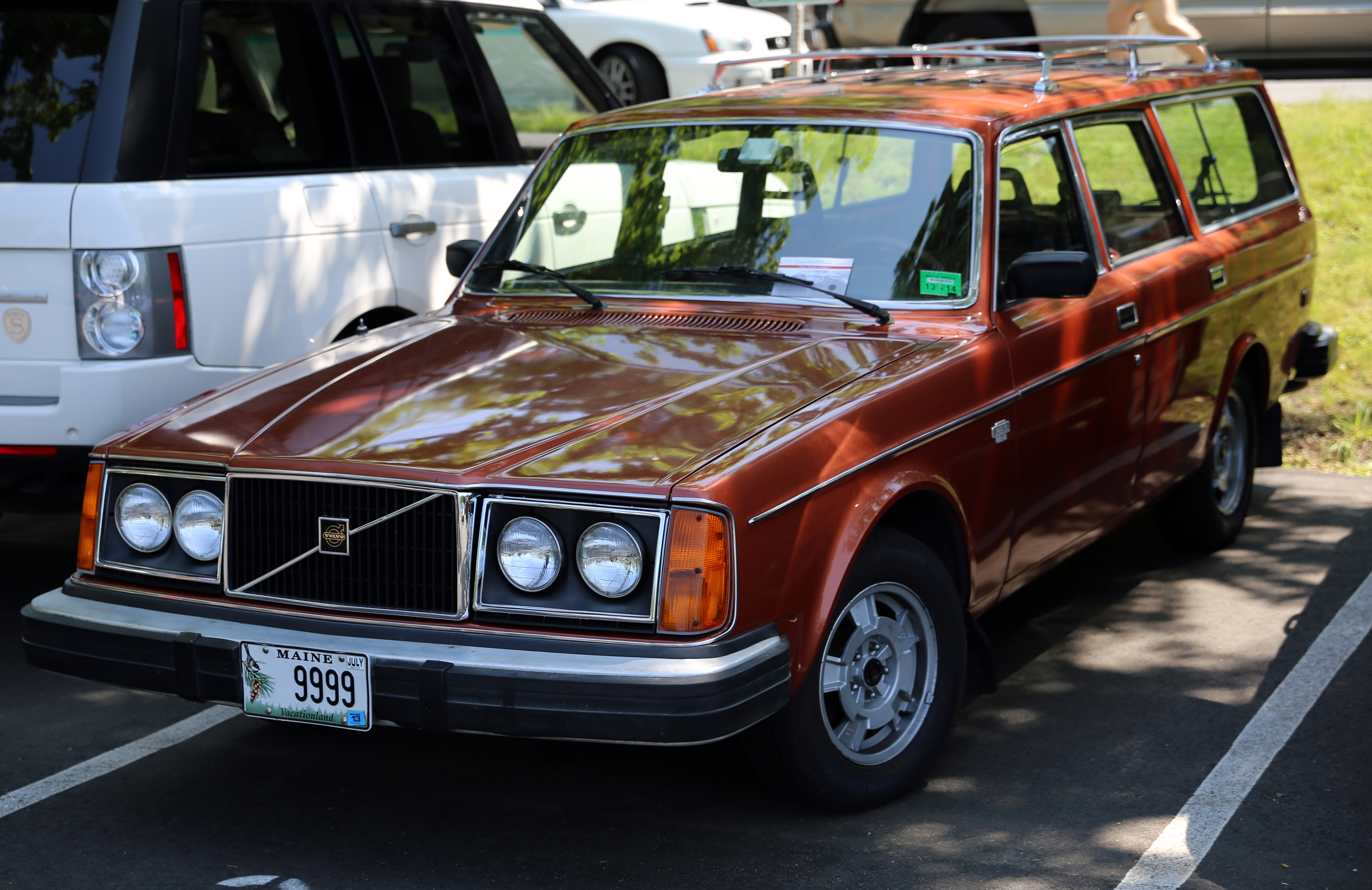
1976–1977 Volvo 265 DL wagon with American-market quad round sealed beam headlamp configuration, as used until 1980 on some models

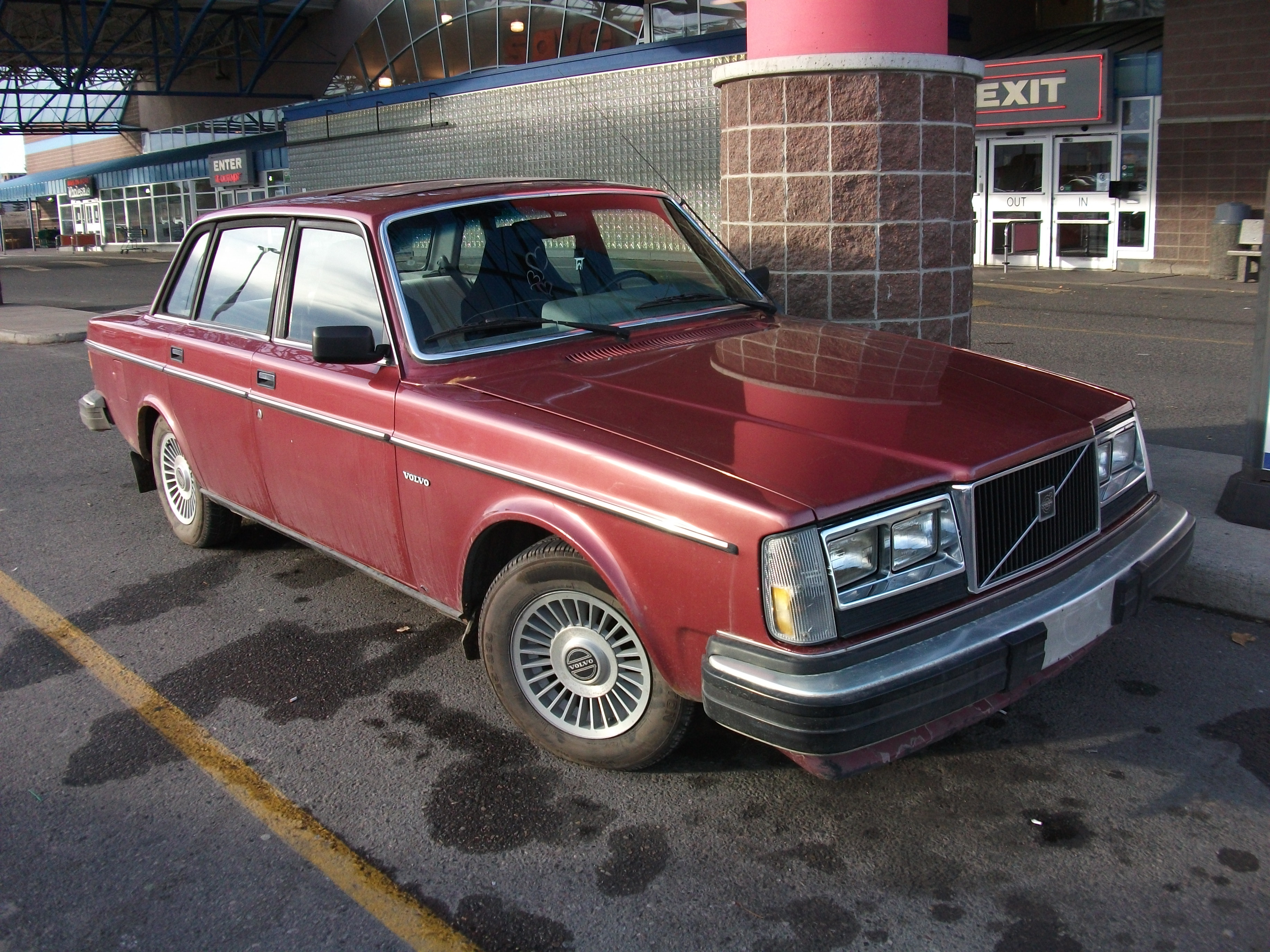
1981 U.S.-spec Volvo 244 GL sedan

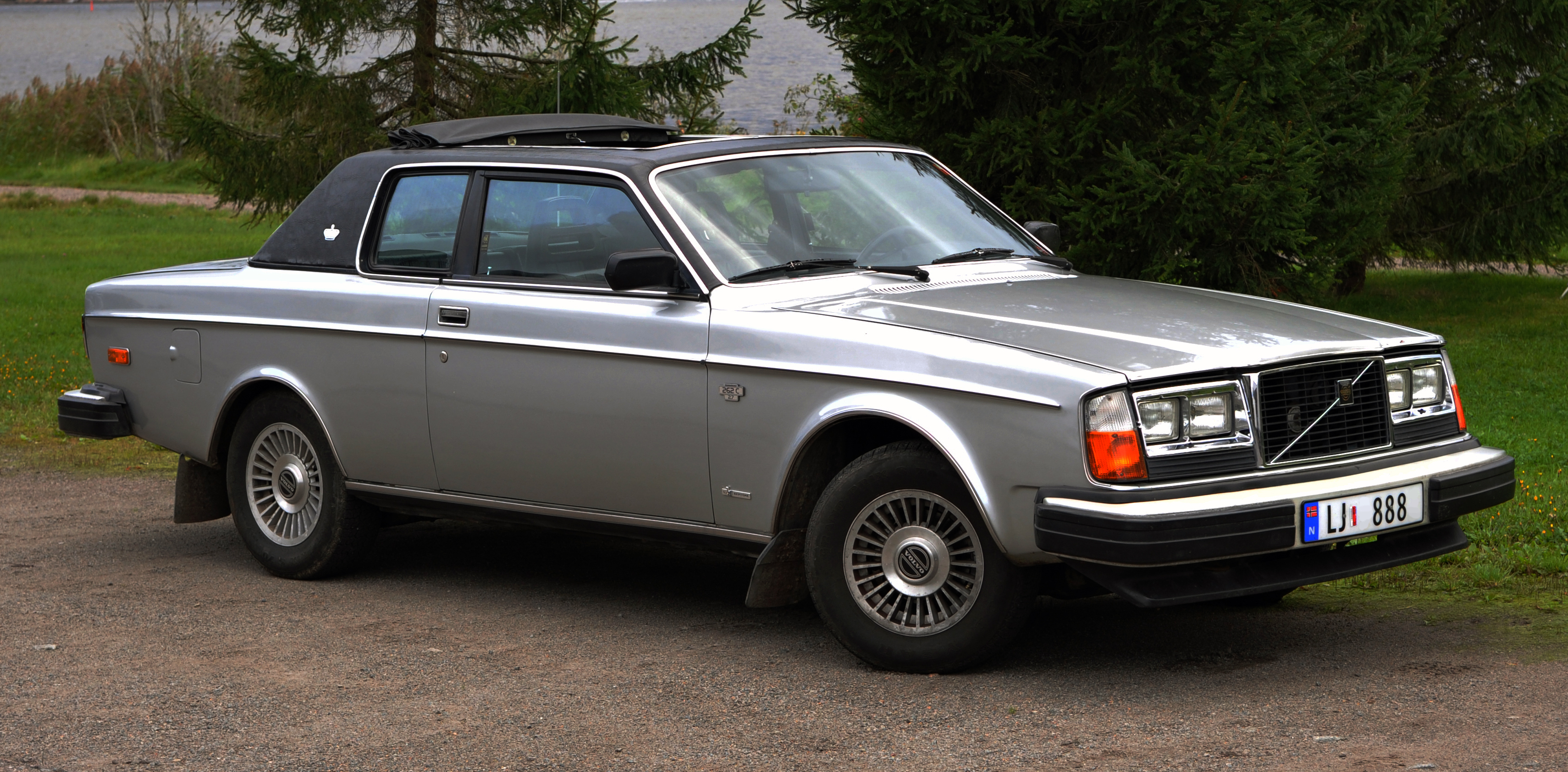
1978 Volvo 262C Bertone with North American quad headlights

- Exterior lighting system compliant with US federal standards
  - Sealed-beam headlamps, 1975–1985
  - Speedometer in miles per hour with inner scale in kilometres per hour; odometer in miles (US market)
  - Plastic-lens replaceable-bulb headlamps, 1986–1993
  - Bosch LH Jetronic Fuel Injection in all petrol non turbo models (1984- 1993)
  - Bell chime to remind to fasten seatbelt, keys are in the ignition switch, or parking lights are still on.
  - Courtesy dome light off delay
  - 5 mph "commando" bumper standards
  - Headlamp wipers not available; wiper shaft hole below headlamps blanked with rubber plug
  - Front and rear side markers and reflectors incorporated into front parking and rear tail lights
  - Rear fog lamps added in the 1985 model year
  - Daytime running lights, using low beams and tail lamps introduced in 1990 in Canada.
- In Canada, various market-specific parts such as block heaters were also added at the Volvo Halifax Assembly.

For 1981, the 260 estate was dropped but the new GLT and GLT Turbo models joined the lineup. The diesel engine was discontinued in 1984, but was still sold in the 1985 model year with a 1984 VIN and 1985 specs. The Turbo model was discontinued in early 1985.

=== American-spec headlamp configurations (1974–1993) ===
^{Quad indicates two headlamps per side; all others one headlamp per side}

Model Year	242	244/245	262/264/265	Turbo/Turbo GLT (242/244/245)
1974–1975	Round 7-inch sealed beams	Round 7-inch sealed beams	N/A	N/A
1976–1977	Round 7-inch sealed beams	Round 7-inch sealed beams	Quad round 5 3/4-inch sealed beams	N/A
1978–1979	Round 7-inch sealed beams	Quad round 5 3/4-inch sealed beams	Quad rectangular 165 mm × 100mm sealed beams	N/A
1980	Round 7-inch sealed beams	DL: quad round 5 3/4-inch sealed beams GL, GLE: quad rectangular 165 mm × 100mm sealed beams	Quad rectangular 165 mm × 100mm sealed beams	N/A
1981–1982	Quad rectangular 165 mm × 100 mm sealed beams (high beams halogen)			
1983–1984	Quad rectangular 165 mm × 100 mm halogen sealed beams	Quad rectangular 165 mm × 100 mm halogen sealed beams	N/A	Quad rectangular 165 mm × 100 mm halogen sealed beams
1985	N/A	Quad rectangular 165 mm × 100 mm halogen sealed beams	N/A	Quad rectangular 165 mm × 100 mm halogen sealed beams
1986–1993	N/A	Replaceable-bulb halogen composite	N/A	N/A

== Special editions ==
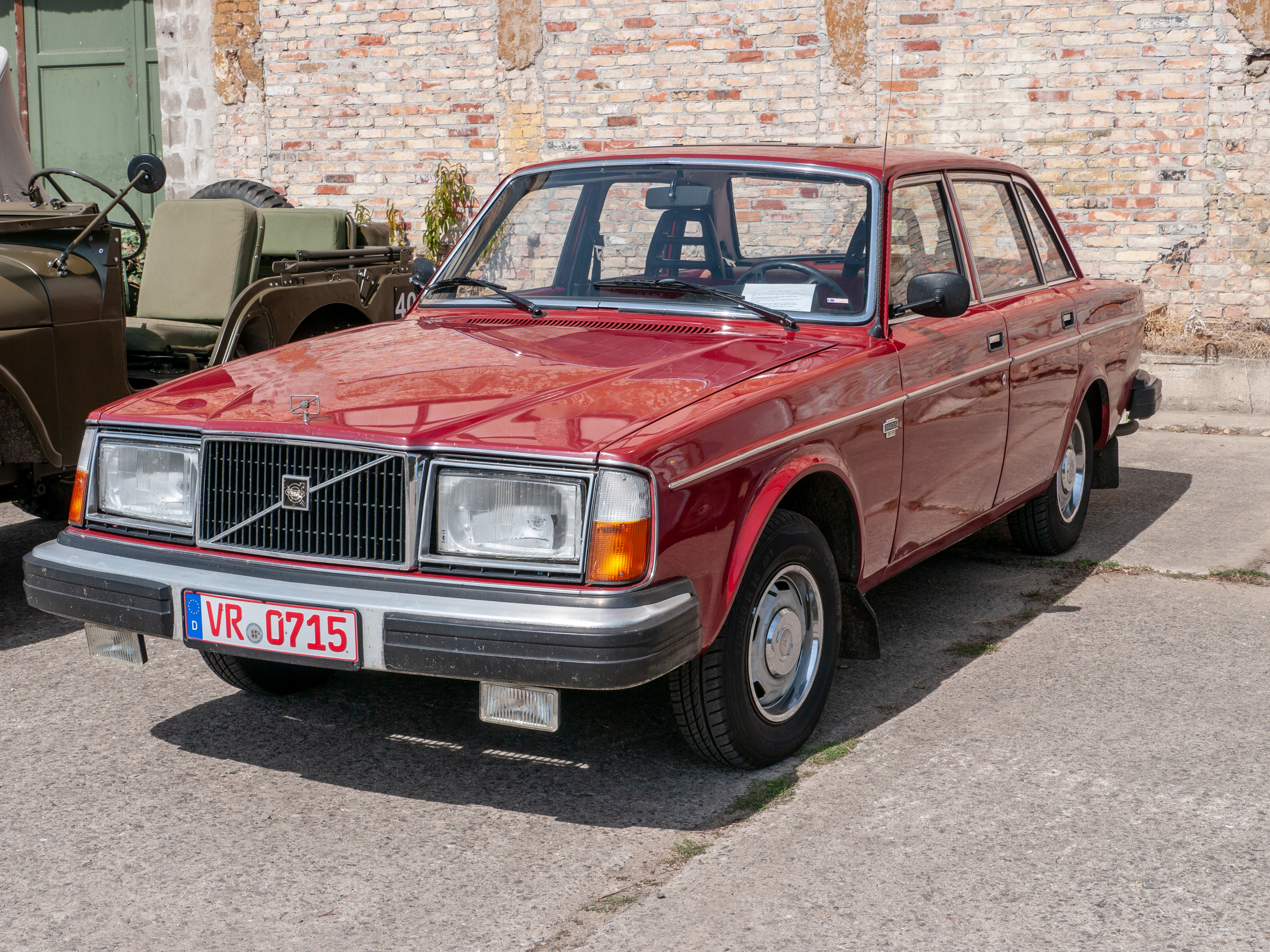
Volvo 244 DLS

- 244 DLS (1977–1978): Export model to the former German Democratic Republic with 264 hood and grille from 264DL. Engine B21A. Five different body paintings (solid) available. Total amount exported approx. 1,000 units. The cars were mainly sold to residents of East Germany. Sedans only.
- DLi – MY 1978 limited edition for West Germany. DL trim; equipped with fuel-injected B21E engine (instead of B21A carbureted engine on standard "DL" models). Mostly sedans.
- GLi: MYs 1981 and 1982 specification for the Netherlands. GL trim; equipped with fuel-injected B21E engine (instead of B21A carbureted engine on standard "GL" models there and then). Only estates.

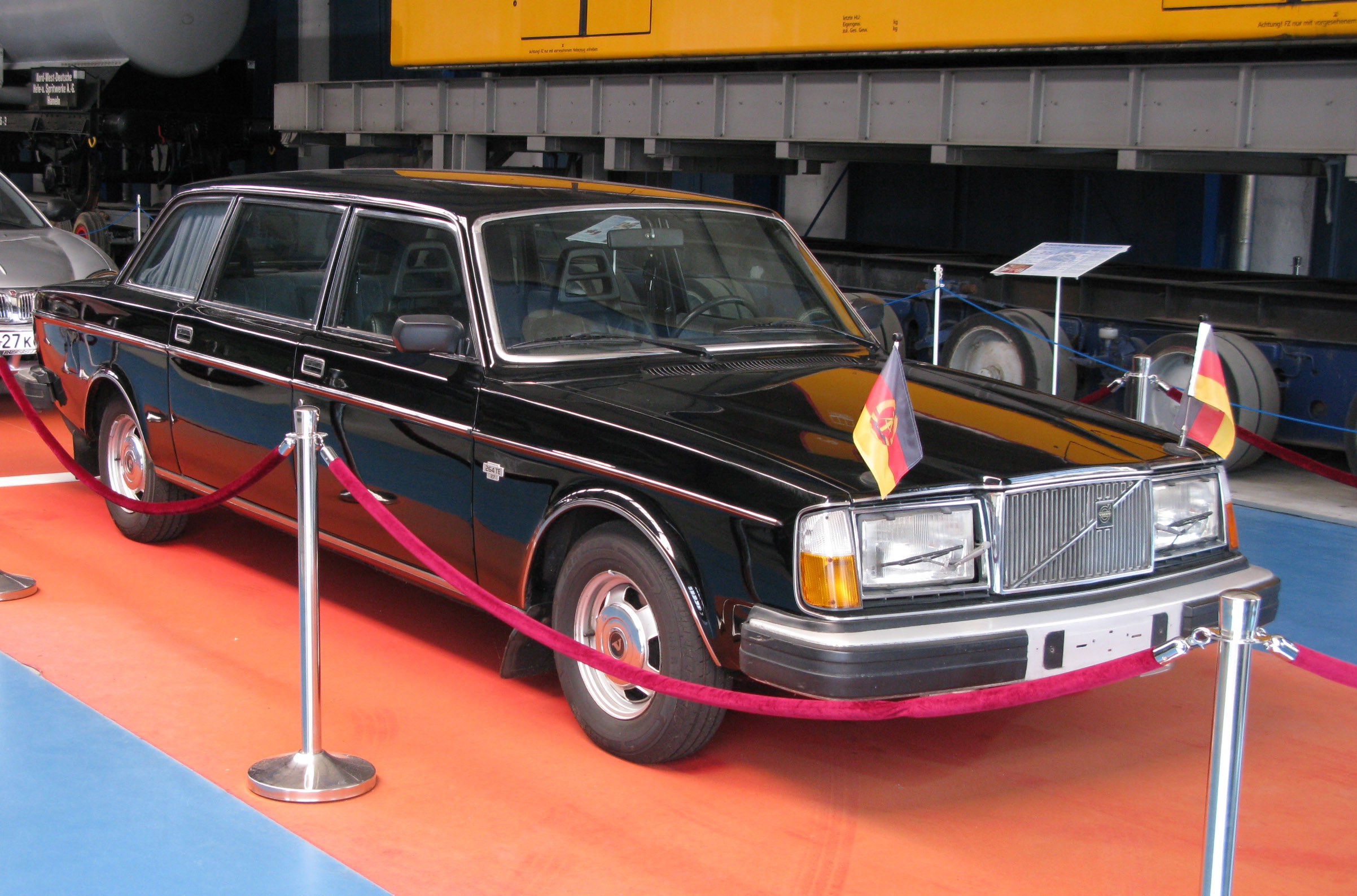
A Volvo 264 TE used as for transporting government officials of the German Democratic Republic in the Oldtimer Museum Rügen

- 264 TE (top executive, 1976–1981): A limousine version of the 264; many now reside in Germany as 135 production models, two in landaulet form, were converted and exported to the former German Democratic Republic until 1984 for transporting government officials, who would neither use the small Trabant or Wartburg models nor import West German autos such as BMWs and Mercedes-Benzes. As a result of the number of politicians seen driving to and from their preferred home town in Volvo 264 TEs, the East German public nicknamed Wandlitz Volvograd.
- 245 T (transfer) (1977–early 1980s): An extended wheelbase station wagon designed to have additional rows of seats for use as taxi or rural school bus. These cars had the same wheelbase as the 264 top executive.
- 262C/coupé by Bertone (1978–1981): This had custom body work and interior from Bertone. The exterior coach building of these two-door saloons consisted of a chopped roof (2.25in shorter than 242) and a more raked windscreen. The 1980 & 1981 models were badged coupé instead of 262C. These cars were further characterized by additional Bertone badges on the front wings. Mostly built in left hand drive form, right hand drive vehicles are very rare.

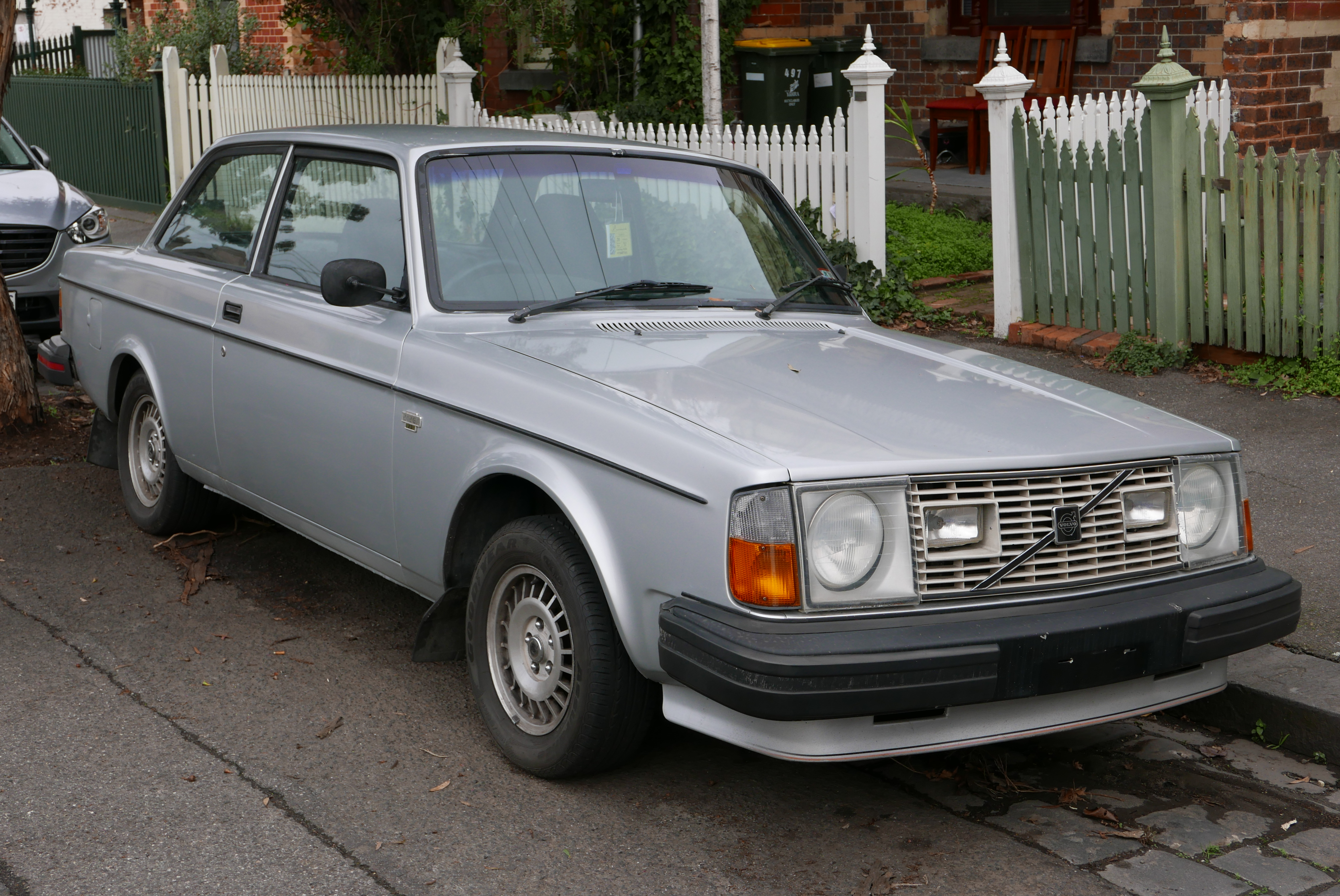
1979 Volvo 242 GT (Australia)

- 242 GT (1978–1980, until 1981 in Australia): Sport model with tuned sport suspension and a fuel injected engine. All US models were Mystic Silver metallic with black and red racing stripes going from the hood to the side to the trunk. Special black corduroy interior with red stripes. 1980 Canadian models were available in black with red pinstripes along the side of the car, in addition to the US model silver. Only 200 black GTs were made. The model was created as Volvo in the US had enjoyed a sportier image and though Volvo now felt too safe and boring. Due to short time and budget constraints they had to make the most with small means. It used the same B21E (B21F in North America) engine as the GL model but it received ventilated front disc brakes, The chassis was improved with front braces, strengthened stabilizers and 30% harder springs than a regular DL. It changed the car from being prone to understeer to being prone to oversteer, something that was often shown in advertising pictures. 3M had approached Volvo about new stripes that would not fade or get damaged in automatic car washes. All 242GTs came in silver metallic with stripes in black and red-orange. Another design change is that decor that was normally chromed was black and vice versa. It had fog lights in the grille as standard and a front spoiler. For the first time in a Volvo the headliner was black. The seats were in black corduroy with red-orange stripes. The dashboard got a central tachometer. In 1979 it got the new high-compression B23E engine. The majoritry of GT model cars were M46 manual transmission, but some Australian market cars did have a BW55 3-speed automatic transmission swapped into them by the importer.
- GLT Turbo (1981–1985): Replaced the GT as the sporty model, equipped with a turbocharged engine, with the 760T intercooler from late 1983, following the sale of the 500 FIA Evolution cars, which were the first 240Ts to be fitted with this uprated intercooler as standard. The two-door model was available 1981–1984; four-door sedans available late 1981-early 1985 and wagons available 1982-early 1985. Came with new black trim as opposed to the popular chrome trim found on the GLs (grille, door trim, door handles, tail light sills and lens dividers). All came factory stock with 15" Virgo alloy wheels.

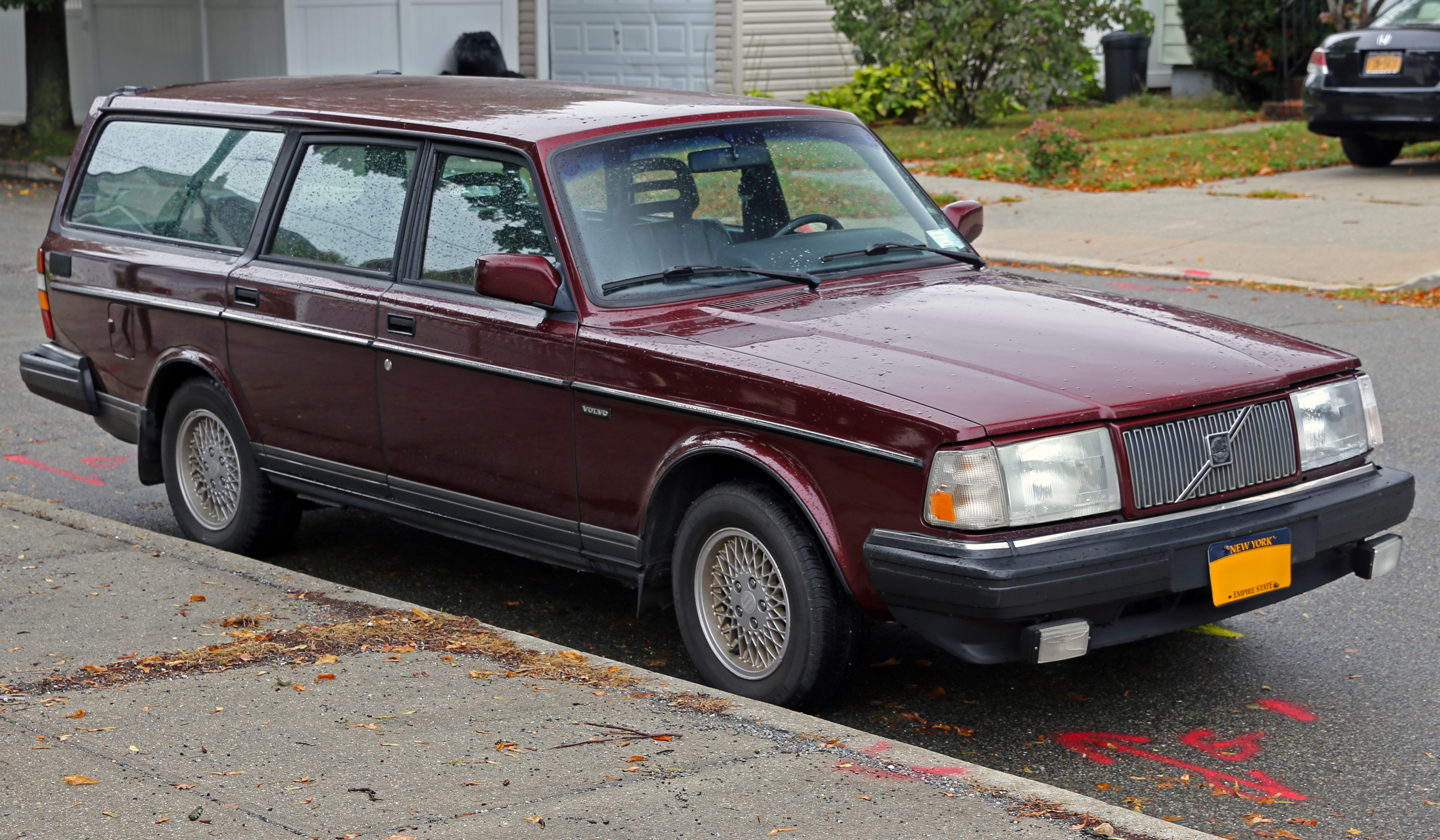
1993 Volvo 240 Classic wagon (US)

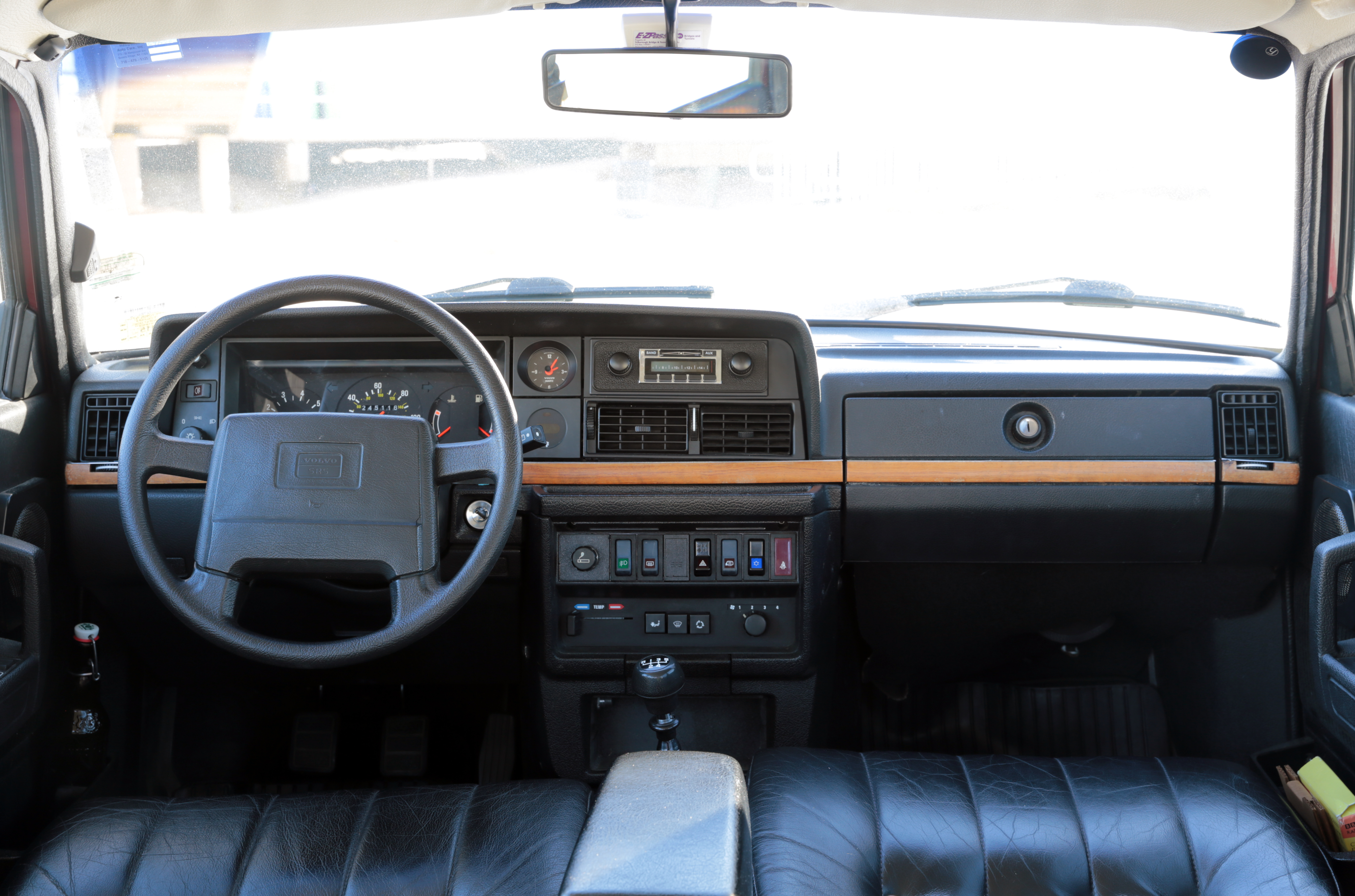
The dash of a 1993 US-market Volvo 240 Classic wagon with manual transmission, leather seats and wood trim

- GLT (1980–1982): Standing for "grand luxe touring," these models shared the uprated suspension, blacked-out exterior trim, and 15" Virgo alloy wheels of the GLT-Turbo model, but with a naturally aspirated powertrain.
- GTX – this was not an actual trim level, but the name of a sporty parts package available from Volvo dealers in much of Scandinavia.
- 244/240 GLE (1981–1985), for Australian market: Due to the problems with fitting a turbocharger to a RHD vehicle the Turbo model was rebadged GLE and retained all the blacked-out trim and high-end interior fittings of the Turbo models but were equipped with the B23E then B230E engines. These were most frequently fitted with the BW55 transmission until 1983 then the AW71 for 1984 and 1985.
- 240 Turbo Evolution (1983): 500 "Evolution" models were built to satisfy production requirements to qualify for the FIA's International Group A touring car racing. The homologation process, intended to make the car competitive with the Jaguar XKS and BMW 635s coupés, was controversial because VMS (Volvo Motor Sport) elected to convert 500 designated cars simultaneously in the United States rather than directly on the European assembly lines. Once inspected by the FIA in the US, the assembled 500 Evolution cars would be stripped of the Evolution kit parts and sold across America. For the sake of clarity all 500 of these cars had sunroofs, and none were ever shipped back to VMS to be built up into Group A race cars. Only the Swedish-built 240 DL body shells were used because they were did not have the undesirable sunroof cutout. VMS realized that there was a loophole in the FIA regulations at that time which did not require that the "Evolution" cars be sold to the public, but merely built and inspected prior to being granted homologation status. Hence the controversy that followed the success of the factory cars when they won the European Touring Car Championship in 1985 and would have won again in 1986, but for a fuel irregularity at one race meeting. This fuel incident also resulted in the board of directors withdrawing from factory supported GpA racing programs. Due to constraints there was insufficient time to install the Evolution components in the 500 designated 240 Turbo cars as they went down the assembly lines in Belgium (save only for the fitting of the European market only flat-nose bonnet and matching grille) and so a decision was made to stow each car's Evolution component kit into the trunks of each of the designated cars before they were shipped to the US, and then retro-fit the component in the US. 270 of these cars were sent to Volvo's West Coast facility at Long Beach, CA, and the remaining 230 cars were sent to Volvo's East Coast facility at Chesapeake Bay, VA. During a period of three weeks all 500 cars were simultaneously retro-fitted with the Evolution kits. However, immediately following the FIA's random inspection of all 500 "Evolution" cars, the installation teams removed all of the Evolution components with the exception of the uprated intercooler and sold to the public as the first of the new uprated 240 Turbo intercooler cars. One car kept its parts and was sent back to VMS. The intercooler was the same kind as used in the 1983 European 760 Turbo. While no full Evolution cars were ever sold to the public, the remaining 499 flat-nosed cars that were sold to the American public were unique, in as much as they were the only flat-nosed 240 Turbo intercooler cars ever imported into the US. All carry a SO2476 designation on the chassis plate. All subsequent 1983 240 Turbo Intercooler cars had the typical projecting, so called coffin-nose and grille, but were fitted as standard with an uprated intercooler which developed more power yet. None of the 500 Evolution cars was ever used by the factory in racing. All of the Factory cars were built up from the 1983 DL body shells because they had no sunroof and were built in Sweden, so they were readily available and relatively cheap. Aside from the flat hoods not otherwise seen on North American 240s the Evolutions also received numerous and substantial performance and suspension upgrades ranging from larger radiators and intercoolers to water injection and large rear spoilers.
- 240 SE (1991–1993): Late, runout edition for certain markets, only for 1991 in the United States. Typically with GL or GLT interior trim but without the performance and handling modifications. Usual equipment was ABS, power mirrors, central locking, tachometer, 14" "Scorpius" alloy rims, all-black grille and trim. Roof rails on wagon model.
- Police (1981–1985): A special edition 240 aimed at the Swedish police, but also made in right-hand-drive form and used by some British constabularies. It was effectively a 240GLT with vinyl, rather than cloth, trim, steel wheels and no sunroof.
- 240 Polar (1991–1993) – Austerely equipped entry level version for certain European markets such as Italy (1991), Belgium and the Netherlands (1992–1993). Italian spec. always, BeNeLux spec. very often with the B200F engine (instead of the B230F). Cloth interior instead of tricot plush on GL-badged vehicles. Another Polar version was earlier (1986) available in the German market.
- 240 Super Polar (1992–1993), for Italian market. Well-equipped version with black leather upholstery, power windows all around, air conditioning, and cross-spoke aluminium wheels. Three different metallic paints to choose between, all-black trim instead of chrome. Only available with the B200F engine. There was also some Rare Wagon only Super Polars equipped with special side graphics, full car width front Bullbar and steel grilles over the rear tail lights.
- 240 Classic (1992–93): European markets from the 1992 model year; Swiss market cars were fitted with the B230FX engine. For the North American market, only 1,600 were produced in April and May 1993, half wagons and half sedans. European Classics have fully equipped interior with wood dash trim and "Classic" badges on hatch/deck lid. In addition to the European equipment, the 1,600 North American Classics have body-matched painted grilles and side mirrors, special 14" alloy wheels, production-number plaque on the dash, and special paint colors — ruby red or metallic dark teal green.
- Limited – (1993); very similar to the Classic, but not numbered and with a brass plaque instead.
- 240 GL (1992): North American market. Slightly different from the early 1975–1989 GL model, more like the 1993 Classic and the 1991 SE model. Only available in 244 sedan body style.
- 240 Torslanda (1992–1993) – Station wagons only, these cars can be identified by Tørslanda badging (a deliberate, Scandinavian-looking misspelling of the town where they were built), tinted windows, plastic exterior trim, multi-spoke 15" alloy wheels, and full-length body striping above the rocker panels. Three body colours were available, either red, white, or silver. Simply equipped, the only features were heated front seats, power steering and the standard heating systems. The Torslanda was sold in Great Britain as a limited run special edition to mark the rundown of 240 production.
- 240 family edition: Entry level cars for the German market from 1990 to 1993. Simplified interior with cloth upholstery (instead of tricot plush on "GL"-models). No heated front seats as standard but all equipped with headlamp wipers and fixed black roof rails. No sedans. Shipped with petrol-fired B230F engine or D24 diesel engine. All badged 240.
- 240 Tack: Limited edition in 1992–93 to phase out the 240 series in Japan; tack means "thank you" in Swedish. Tricot plush trim, five body paintings to choose. Sedans and estates. All units with B230F engine. At the same time a more upmarket limited edition badged "Classic" was offered. Same five paintings as "Tack" available, but shipped with black leather upholstery, wood trim on the dash board and "Corona" alloy wheels. Also engine B230F. Sedans and estates as well.

=== Anniversary special editions ===
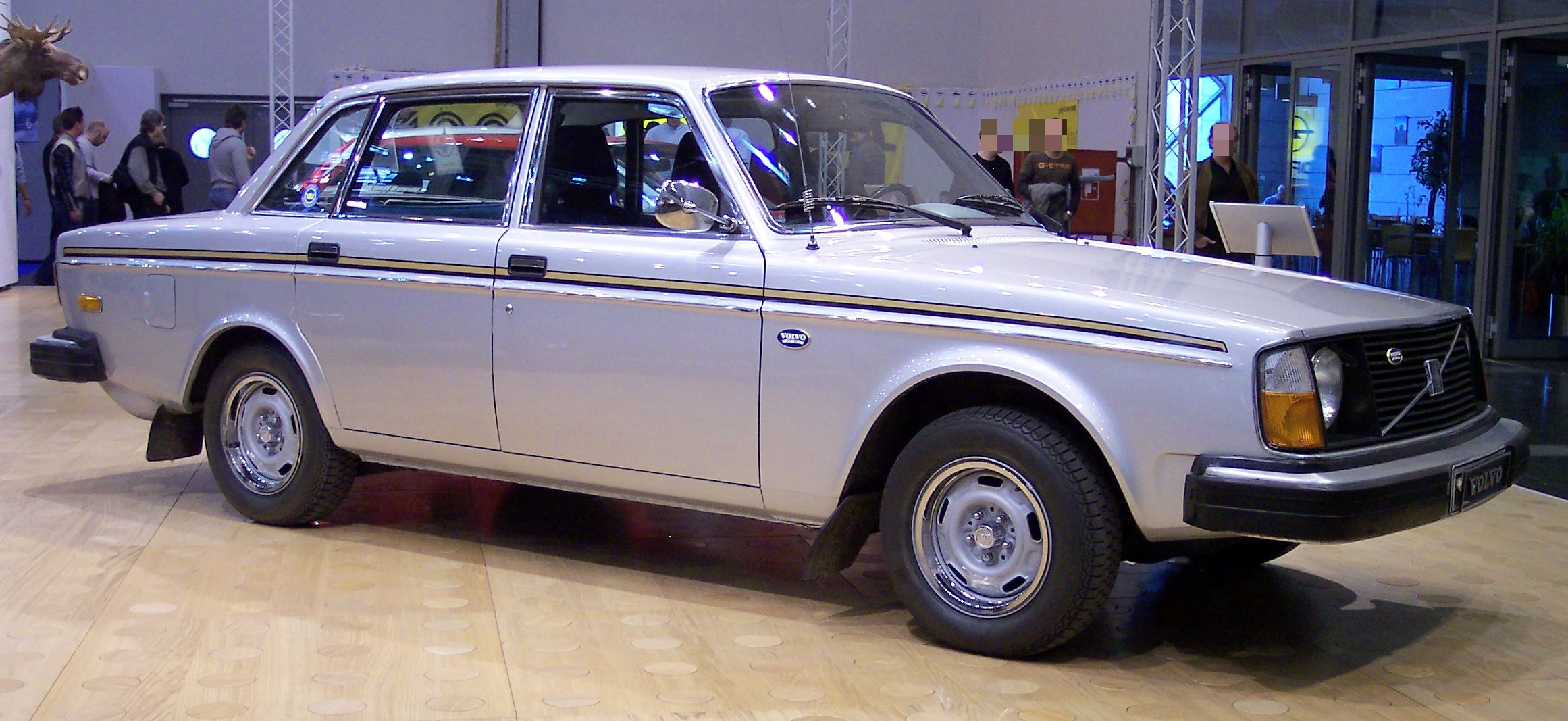
European-spec 1977 Volvo 244 DL Anniversary edition

- 244 DL Anniversary (1977): Volvo released this model to celebrate its fiftieth anniversary. Based on the 244DL, the anniversary car was finished in metallic silver with a black and gold band around the waistline. Around 50 were sold in ten different countries, taking the total number produced up to 500.
- 264 Anniversary (1977) Volvo released this model to celebrate its fiftieth anniversary. Based on the 264, the anniversary car was finished in metallic silver with a black and gold band around the waistline. Numbers produced unknown.
- 240 DL Jubileum (1987): Volvo released this model to celebrate its sixtieth anniversary. Like the fiftieth anniversary edition, it was based on the 240 DL series, only this time it was available as both a saloon and an estate.
- 244 Thor (1979–1980) Around 300 were produced for the UK market and this spec lay somewhere near the GLE spec. Noticeable extras fitted as standard were, metallic black paint, premium stereo, auto box, black cloth seats, front electric windows and corona alloy wheels and fuel injection. Noticeable exclusions for a limited edition premium model were, power steering, electric rear windows and air conditioning.

== Concept models ==
Volvo produced a prototype for a hatchback version in 1975, badged the Volvo 263 GL, but it was not chosen for mass production and is now on display in the Volvo World Museum in Gothenburg, Sweden.

Volvo also produced a prototype in 1978 called the 242 GTC Turbo, which had roof pillars similar to that of a 262 C, and a body design of a 242 GT. It also came with striping on the sides, close to the bottom of the car with the word turbo on it to make it seem lower than it actually was. It was originally planned to have two engine choices, a 16 valve I4 engine (made for racing), and a turbocharged version of the B21 Redblock I4 engine which was under construction.

== 240 in motorsport ==
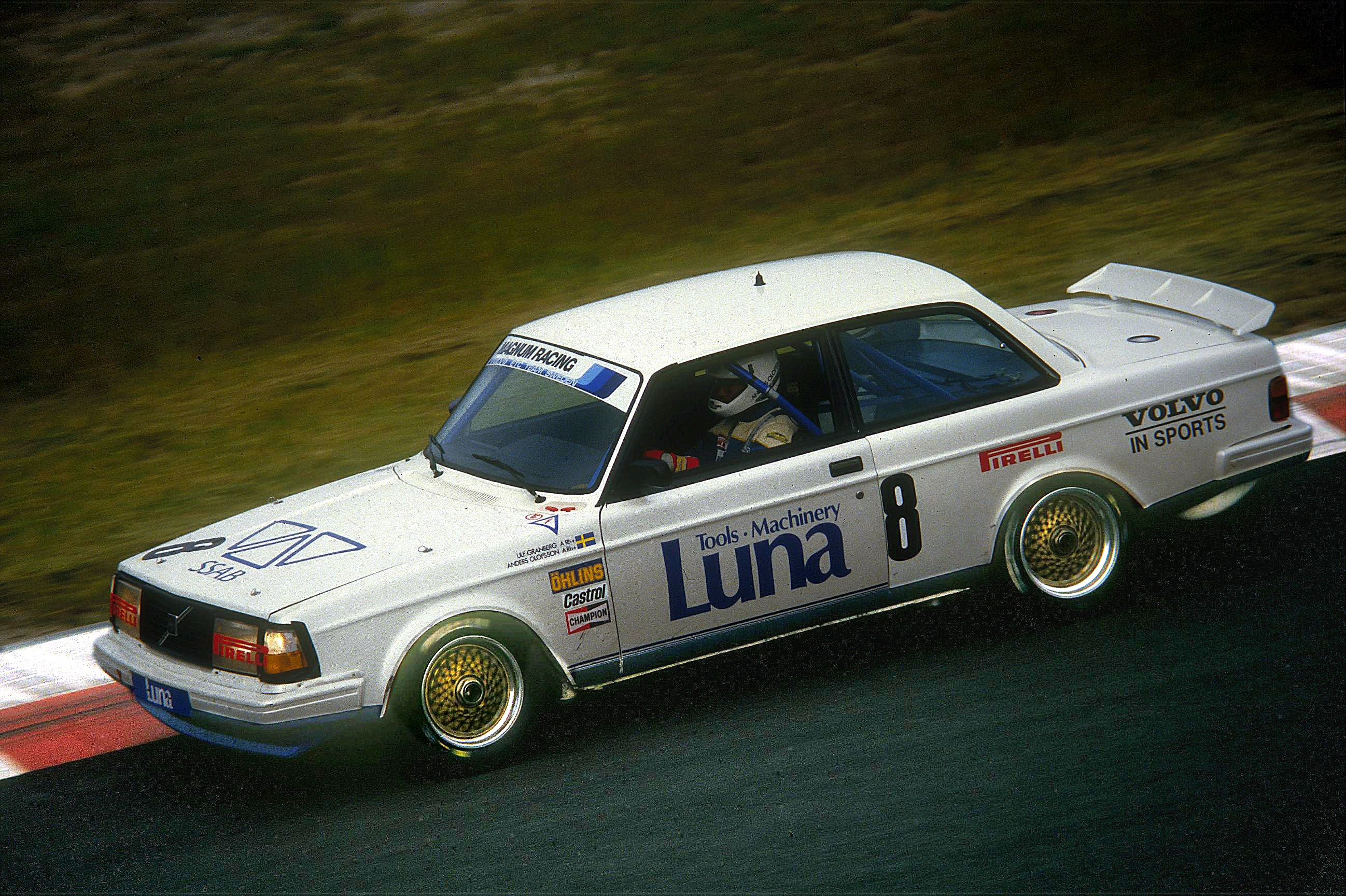
Volvo 240 Turbo at the Nürburgring 1985

Despite its non-sporting image, the Volvo 240 was a successful competitor in touring car racing in the 1980s. In 1983 Volvo produced 505 evolution version of the 240 Turbo with a larger turbocharger and other performance modifications. All of these special cars were exported to the United States with the special equipment kit in the trunk of each car. 270 of these cars were retrofitted with the special equipment at Long Beach and further 240s were simultaneously fitted with the same kit on the East Coast at the Volvo Penta facility at Chesapeake Bay. All 500, except for one car which was returned to Sweden, were subsequently stripped of their GpA homologation equipment and sold as standard road cars. This was allowed under the Group A regulations, the cars only having to have been made and not necessarily sold. Nevertheless, it did lead to protests from other teams, until Volvo was able to produce proof that the 500 cars had indeed been manufactured.

Nevertheless, the 240 Turbo proved a successful competitor, and in 1984 won the Zolder round of the European Touring Car Championship. In Group A racing form, the 240T weighed 1,065 kg (2,348 lb), and its turbocharged 2.1-liter engine produced approximately 350 bhp (261 kW; 355 PS). Although it was a big car and lacked the agility of some of its competitors, and despite its boxy, un-aerodynamic appearance, it was fast in a straight line (approximately 260 km/h (162 mph) on faster circuits such as Monza, Hockenheim and Bathurst) and proved to be reliable. Volvo Motor Sport, VMS, did not run the cars directly, instead contracting the services of established teams to prepare and manage them, with technical assistance from VMS.

The Eggenberger Motorsport team was the most successful of these. Late in the 1984 European Touring Car Championship, Swedish team Sportpromotion won the EG Trophy race at Zolder circuit and followed that with second in the 500 km del Mugello. In 1985, Volvo signed Swiss engine guru Ruedi Eggenberger to run its works team. Eggenberger Motorsport, with team drivers Gianfranco Brancatelli and Thomas Lindström, won the 1985 ETCC outright, seeing off challenges from BMW (Schnitzer), and defending ETCC champions TWR who were running the V8-engined Rover Vitesse rather than the V12 Jaguar XJS that had dominated 1984 after Jaguar had decided to concentrate on sports car racing.

Eggenberger moved to race Ford Sierras in 1986 and Volvo contracted Belgian based team RAS Sport to be its factory "works" team in the ETCC, with defending champion Lindström being joined by ex-Formula One and Grand Prix motorcycle racer Johnny Cecotto, as well as Ulf Granberg and Anders Olofsson in the second car. The team was competitive in 1986, taking wins at Hockenheim, Anderstorp, Brno, Österreichring and Zolder. However, the wins at Anderstorp and the Österreichring were taken away from the team due to illegal fuel. The disqualifications would see Lindström unable to defend his title, and Volvo AB quit GpA racing.

Around the world, other teams were also running the Volvo 240T with fair degrees of success. New Zealand business man and racer Mark Petch had purchased an ex GTM Team car directly from VMS 240T and with drivers Robbie Francevic and Michel Delcourt won the Wellington 500 street race in New Zealand in January 1985 after starting from the rear of the grid due to the car not arriving in time to qualify. MPM, Mark Petch Motorsport took the car to Australia with financial assistance from Volvo Australia. Francevic then went on to finish 5th in the 1985 Australian Touring Car Championship (the first ATCC to be run under Group A rules), taking out right wins at Symmons Plains and Oran Park. Thomas Lindström joined Francevic to drive in the 1986 Wellington 500 and brought with him from Europe the latest engine and suspension upgrades for the car. Petch with the help of Bob Atkins, head of The Australian Volvo Dealer Council, formed the AVDT, Australian Volvo Dealer Team who purchased Petch's car and spares immediately following MPM's second back to back win at the opening two round of the 1986 ATCC. The Volvo Dealer Team expanded to two cars, for the fourth round of the ATCC at Adelaide with the new car RHD car, ex RAS, being for dual Australian Single Seater Drivers' Champion John Bowe who had driven with Francevic at the 1985 Bathurst 1000. Francevic won the 1986 Australian Touring Car Championship the first and only time that the title had been won by a Volvo driver and the first time since its inception in 1960 that it had been won with a car powered by a turbocharged engine. Volvo GpA cars also won the Guia Race in Macau consecutively in 1985 and 1986.

The Volvo 240 Turbo won the 24 Hours of Zolder in 1987 and 1990.

Volvo withdrew from the sport at the end of the 1986 season, partly because of the RAS team being found guilty of using non-approved race fuel, but primarily because the 240T had achieved what it set out to do. Volvo did not return to touring car racing until the advent of Super Touring racing in the early 1990s, with the 850 model.

The 240 also enjoyed some success in other branches of motorsport. Although Volvo had pulled out of rallying in the early 1970s, the 240 Turbo did see action as a Group A rally car in the mid-1980s, but without works backing it met with only limited success. The normally aspirated version remained eligible for international competition until 1996, and to this day the 240 remains a popular clubman's rally car in Scandinavia. Its popularity has in recent years been boosted with the establishment of the Volvo Original Cup, or VOC. This is a championship for amateur rally drivers using Volvo 240s, 740s and 940s. In the interests of cost control, only very limited modifications are allowed to the cars. The series attracts large numbers of competitors, attracted by its low cost and by the Volvo's rear-drive handling and reliability.

Because it is cheap and robust, the 240 has also become very common in folkrace competitions. In the UK the 240 is popular for banger racing, due to its strength. The Volvo 240 is now a common choice alongside Ford Granadas and Jaguars for using at unlimited banger meetings. In the United States, 240s regularly appear in low-budget endurance racing series such as 24 Hours of LeMons, where the 240's reliability, durability, and easy parts availability are appreciated.
