= Ford Focus (second generation, Europe) =

Second generation of Ford Focus marketed in Europe and other international markets

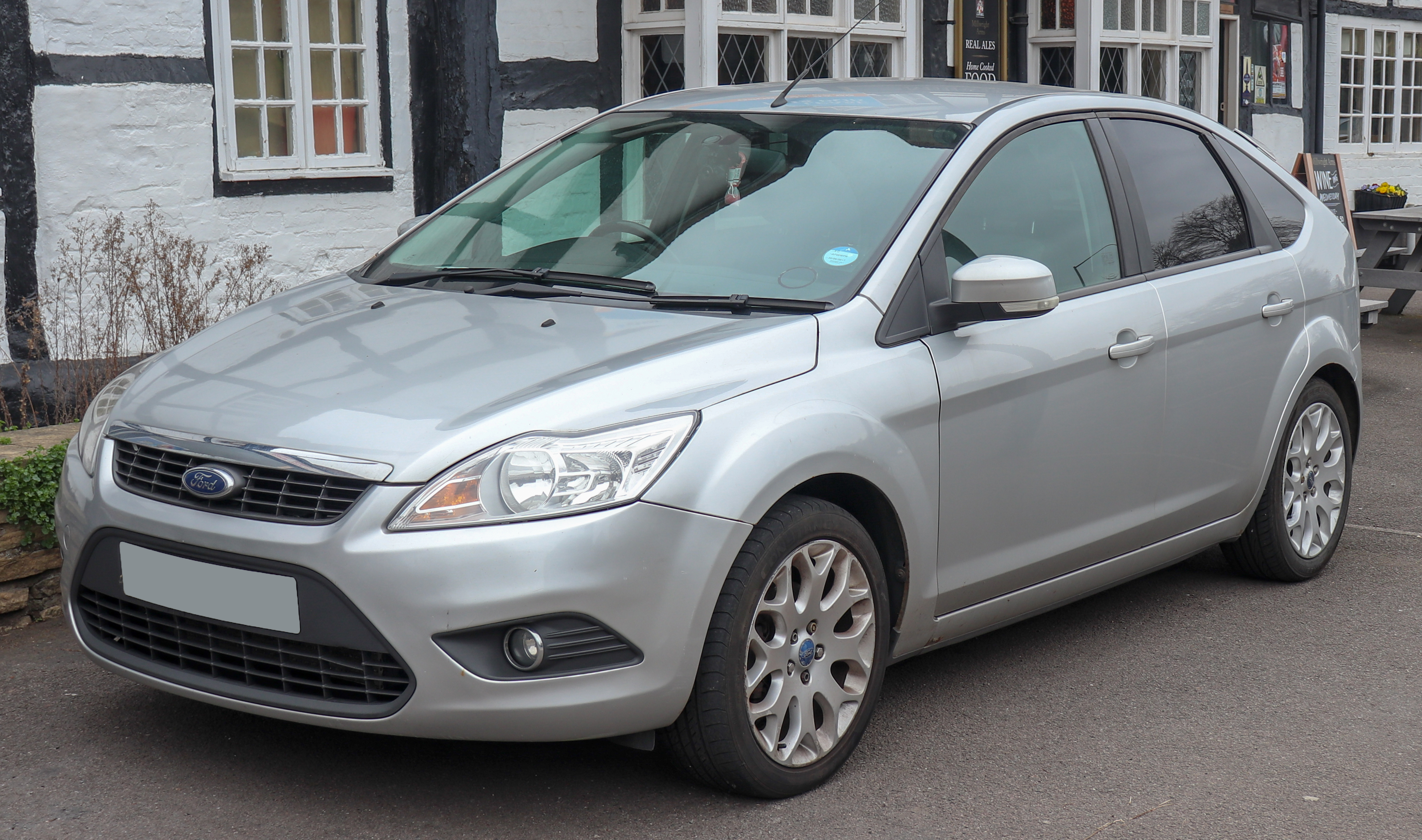

Overview
- Manufacturer: Ford
- Also called: Ford Focus Classic (China, 2011–2014)
- Production: August 2004–2010; 2005–2014 (China); 2008–2016 (Argentina)
- Model years: 2005–2010 (Europe); 2009–2016 (Argentina)
- Assembly: Germany: Saarlouis; Spain: Valencia; Russia: Vsevolozhsk (Ford Sollers); Italy: Turin (Pininfarina: Coupé-Cabriolet); Taiwan: Chungli; Argentina: General Pacheco; Philippines: Santa Rosa; South Africa: Pretoria (Samcor); China: Chongqing (Changan Ford Mazda)
- Designer: Murat Güler (2001)

Body and chassis
- Class: Compact car / Small family car (C)
- Body style: 3- and 5-door hatchback; 4-door saloon; 5-door estate; 2-door coupé cabriolet
- Layout: Front-engine, front-wheel-drive
- Platform: Ford C1 platform
- Related: Ford Escort (China); Ford C-Max Mk I; Ford Kuga Mk I; Mazda Axela/Mazda3 (BK); Mazda Premacy/Mazda5 (CR); Mazda CX-7; Volvo C30; Volvo S40; Volvo V50

Powertrain
- Engine: Petrol: 1.4 L Duratec I4; 1.6 L Duratec I4; 1.6 L Duratec Ti-VCT I4; 1.8 L Duratec HE I4; 1.8 L Duratec HE FFV I4; 2.0 L Duratec HE I4; 2.5 L Duratec turbo I5; Diesel: 1.6 L DuraTorq TDCi I4; 1.6 L DuraTorq DLD-416 TDCi DPF I4; 1.8 L DuraTorq DLD-418 TDCi I4; 2.0 L DW10 TDCi I4
- Transmission: 4-speed 4F27E Durashift automatic (1.6 and 2.0 gasoline only); 5-speed iB5 Durashift manual (1.4 and 1.6 gasoline only); 5-speed MTX-75 Durashift manual (1.8 and 2.0 gasoline, 1.6 and 1.8 diesel only); 6-speed Durashift manual (2.5 gasoline and 2.0 diesel only); 6-speed PowerShift dual-clutch automatic (2.0 diesel only); Durashift CVT (1.6 diesel only)

Dimensions
- Wheelbase: 2,640 mm (103.9 in)
- Length: 2004-07 Hatchback: 4,340 mm (170.9 in); 2005-07 Saloon: 4,480 mm (176.4 in); 2005-07 Estate: 4,470 mm (176.0 in); 2005-07 ST: 4,360 mm (171.7 in); 2007 Coupé cabriolet: 4,510 mm (177.6 in); 2008–2010 Hatchback: 4,337 mm (170.7 in); 2008–2010 Saloon: 4,481 mm (176.4 in); 2008–2010 Estate: 4,468 mm (175.9 in); 2008–2010 ST: 4,360 mm (171.7 in); 2008–2010 Coupé cabriolet: 4,509 mm (177.5 in)
- Width: 2004-07 saloon, hatchback and estate: 1,840 mm (72.4 in); 2007 Coupé cabriolet: 1,835 mm (72.2 in); 2008–2010 Saloon, Hatchback and Estate: 1,839 mm (72.4 in); 2008–2010 Coupé cabriolet: 1,834 mm (72.2 in)
- Height: 2004-07 Hatchback and Estate: 1,500 mm (59.1 in); 2005-07 Saloon: 1,495 mm (58.9 in); 2008–2010 Hatchback and Saloon: 1,497 mm (58.9 in); 2008–2010 Estate: 1,503 mm (59.2 in) and 1,537 mm (60.5 in); 2005-07 Coupé cabriolet: 1,448 mm (57.0 in); 2008–2010 Coupé cabriolet: 1,455 mm (57.3 in); ST: 1,537 mm (60.5 in)
- Curb weight: 1,229–1,630 kg (2,709–3,594 lb)

Chronology
- Predecessor: Ford Focus (first generation)
- Successor: Ford Focus (third generation)

The Ford Focus Mk 2 is the second generation of Ford Focus, a range of small family cars produced by Ford Motor Company from 2005 to 2010. It was launched at the Paris Motor Show on September 25, 2004, as a three and five-door hatchback and an estate, although the new car was previewed, in 4-door saloon form, as the 'Focus Concept' developed by Ford Europe at the Beijing Motor Show in June 2004.

== Design and engineering ==
The Mk 2, code-named C307, uses the Ford C1 platform which is shared with the Volvo C30, S40, V50, C70, Mazda3 and Focus C-Max. Ford calls this platform sharing programme "Global Shared Technologies".

The basic suspension design, which contributed much to the Mk 1's success, was carried over largely unchanged from its predecessor, which, along with a 10% stiffer bodyshell, offers a better ride according to Ford. The same body styles as the Mk 1 Focus were offered; however, the saloon (sedan) variant was introduced in mid-2005.

The Focus Mk 2 is much larger and considerably heavier than its predecessor, with a 25 mm (1 in) increase in wheelbase 168 mm (6.6 in) longer. It is 8 mm (0.3 in) taller and 138 mm (5.4 in) wider. As a result, the interior and boot space have increased. New technologies include a KeyFree system, a solar-reflect windshield, adaptive front lighting, Bluetooth hands-free phones, and voice control for audio, telephone, and climate control systems.

It also features either a Durashift 6-speed manual transmission, Durashift 4-speed automatic transmission, the all-new Durashift advanced manual transmission, or just the standard manual.

The perceived build quality and finish of the interior was another important step up from the Mk 1—an area where the original car was criticized in comparison to the Volkswagen Golf Mk4, which had defined a much higher standard for the class overall. As a consequence, the Mk 2 featured a padded, soft feel dashboard, damped action for the glovebox, interior grab handles, chrome finish interior door handles, more positive action switchgear, and with better attention paid to material quality and overall finish compared to the Mk 1.

Stylistically, the Mk 2's styling features the same design language found in the Mondeo and Fiesta. Although still recognisable as a Focus the new car uses styling features from the abandoned B-Proposal for the original Focus, which never reached production.

== Availability ==
The Focus Mk 2 was built in Silverton, South Africa for export to Australia and New Zealand. However, shortly after launch, Ford New Zealand redirected its supply to meet Australia's high demand and now receives vehicles from the German factory in Saarlouis. In the ASEAN markets, the Focus was also built in Santa Rosa, Philippines. In 2006, the Mk 2 made its debut in the Americas with its launch on the Mexican market as the 4-door saloon or the sporty 3-door in ST trim. The Mk 2 Focus is now available alongside base versions of the Mk 1 model in some other markets worldwide such as Brazil, Argentina, Chile, Colombia, and Venezuela. In Argentina, the Mk 1 Focus was built alongside the Mk 2 in the Pacheco Factory until 2008 and was discontinued in 2010, when the Mk 2 finally replaced it. Ford then discontinued the European Focus Mk2 after completing its current generation life cycle at the end of the 2010 model year, and was replaced by the globally assembled Focus Mk3.

In the U.S. and Canada, the Mk 1 Focus was offered in a redesigned form as either a saloon or coupe, the hatchbacks and wagon having been dropped after the 2008 redesign. Sales of the coupe model have been only a small fraction of the previous 3-door hatchback, despite rising sales of the Focus saloon and compact cars in general.

== Safety ==
In 2004, the new Focus achieved the highest Euro NCAP ratings in its class: 5 stars for adult protection, 4 out of 5 for child protection, and 2 out of 4 for pedestrian protection, beating such contenders as the Vauxhall/Opel Astra and Volkswagen Golf Mk5, including full (16/16) marks for the front impact test.

The Focus in its most basic Latin American market configuration received 4 stars for adult occupants and 3 stars for toddlers from Latin NCAP 1.0 in 2011.

Latin NCAP 1.0 test results Ford Focus Hatchback+ 2 Airbags (2011, based on Euro NCAP 1997)
Test	Points	Stars
Adult occupant:	13.53/17.0	4 /5 stars
Child occupant:	33.68/49.00	3 /5 stars

ANCAP test results* Ford Focus 5 door hatch with side curtain airbags (2005)
Test	Score
Overall	5 /5 stars
Frontal offset	15.66/16
Side impact	15.80/16
Pole	Not Assessed
Seat belt reminders	0/3
Whiplash protection	Not Assessed
Pedestrian protection	Marginal
Electronic stability control	Optional

ANCAP test results* Ford Focus 5 door hatches with dual frontal airbags (2008)
Test	Score
Overall	4 /5 stars
Frontal offset	15.66/16
Side impact	15.80/16
Pole	2/2
Seat belt reminders	0/3
Whiplash protection	Not Assessed
Pedestrian protection	Marginal
Electronic stability control	Optional

ANCAP test results* Ford Focus variant(s) as tested (2009)
Test	Score
Overall	5 /5 stars
Frontal offset	15.66/16
Side impact	15.80/16
Pole	2/2
Seat belt reminders	1/3
Whiplash protection	Not Assessed
Pedestrian protection	Marginal
Electronic stability control	Standard

== Engines ==
The engine lineup for the Mk 2 is a mixture of old and new. The 1.4 L and 1.6 L all aluminium Zetec-SE (codenamed Sigma) engines from the previous generation Focus were heavily upgraded and renamed Duratec, with the addition of 1.6 L Duratec Ti-VCT engine with variable valve timing. For the South African market, the 1.6L BZ straight-four engine was used in their Mk2. For the 2009 facelift, it was replaced by the 1.8 Duratec.

The 1.8 L and 2.0 L Zetec petrol engines of the original were replaced with the Duratec HE.

The Duratorq Diesel engine in 'Tiger' Duratorq 1.6 L 90 hp (67 kW) and 110 hp (82 kW) editions, 'Lynx' Duratorq 1.8L 115 hp (86 kW) diesel carried over from the previous model and the diesel in 2.0 L form rounds off the range in standard Focus guise (this is a different unit to the diesel in the Mondeo).

Petrol

- 1.4 L Duratec 80PS
- 1.6 L Duratec 100PS
- 1.6 L Duratec Ti-VCT 115PS
- 1.8 L Duratec HE 125PS
- 2.0 L Duratec HE 145PS
- 2.5 L Duratec ST turbo I5 225PS
- 2.5 L Duratec RS turbo I5 305PS
- 2.5 L Duratec RS 500 turbo I5 350PS

Diesel

- 1.6 L Duratorq TDCi 90PS, 100PS & 109PS
- 1.8 L Duratorq TDCi 115PS
- 2.0 L Duratorq TDCi 110PS & 136PS

=== Specifications for petrol engines ===
Engine	Gearbox	Power	Torque	Economy (Urban) L/100 km	Economy (Extra-Urban) L/100 km	Economy (Combined) L/100 km	Top Speed	0–100 km/h (0-62 mph) s
1.4-L Duratec	5M	80 PS; 79 bhp	124 N·m; 91 lb·ft	8.7	5.4	6.6	164 km/h 102 mph	14.1
1.6-L Duratec	5M / 4A	100 PS; 99 bhp	150 N·m; 111 lb·ft	8.7 / 10.3	5.5 / 5.8	6.7 / 7.5	180 / 172 km/h 112 / 107 mph	11.9 / 13.6
1.6-L Ti-VCT Duratec	5M	115 PS; 113 bhp	155 N·m; 114 lb·ft	8.7	5.4	6.6	190 km/h 118 mph	10.8
1.8-L Duratec HE	5M	125 PS; 123 bhp	165 N·m; 122 lb·ft	9.5	5.6	7.0	198 km/h 123 mph	10.3
2.0-L Duratec HE	5M / 4A	145 PS; 143 bhp	185 N·m; 136 lb·ft	9.8 / 11.2	5.4 / 6.1	7.1 / 8.0	206 / 195 km/h 128 / 121 mph	9.2 / 10.7
2.5-L Duratec ST	6M	225 PS; 222 bhp	320 N·m; 236 lb·ft	13.8	6.8	9.3	241 km/h 150 mph	6.8
2.5-L Duratec RS	6M	305 PS; 301 bhp	440 N·m; 325 lb·ft	13.4	7.0	9.4	263 km/h 163 mph	5.9
2.5-L Duratec RS500	6M	350 PS; 345 bhp	460 N·m; 339 lb·ft	?	?	?	265 km/h 165 mph	5.6

=== Specifications for diesel engines ===
Engine	Gearbox	Power	Torque	Economy (Urban) L/100 km	Economy (Extra-Urban) L/100 km	Economy (Combined) L/100 km	Top Speed	0–100 km/h (0-62 mph) s
1.6-L Duratorq TDCi (HHDA/TD025)	5M	90 PS; 89 bhp	215 N·m; 159 lb·ft	5.6	3.8	4.5	177 km/h 110 mph	12.6
1.6-L Duratorq TDCi (G8DA)	5M	109 PS; 108 bhp	260 N·m; 192 lb·ft	5.8	3.8	4.5	188 km/h 117 mph	10.6
1.8-L Duratorq TDCi (KKDA)	5M	115 PS; 113 bhp	300 N·m; 221 lb·ft	6.7	4.3	5.2	190 km/h 118 mph	10.8
2.0-L Duratorq TDCi (IXDA)	6M	110 PS; 109 bhp	265 N·m; 195 lb·ft	?	?	5.9	186 km/h 116 mph	11.6
2.0-L Duratorq TDCi (G6DA/G6DB)	6M / 6A	136 PS; 134 bhp	340 N·m; 251 lb·ft	7.0 / ?	4.5 / ?	5.5 / ?	203 / 200 km/h 126 / 124 mph	9.3 / 9.6

== Trim levels ==
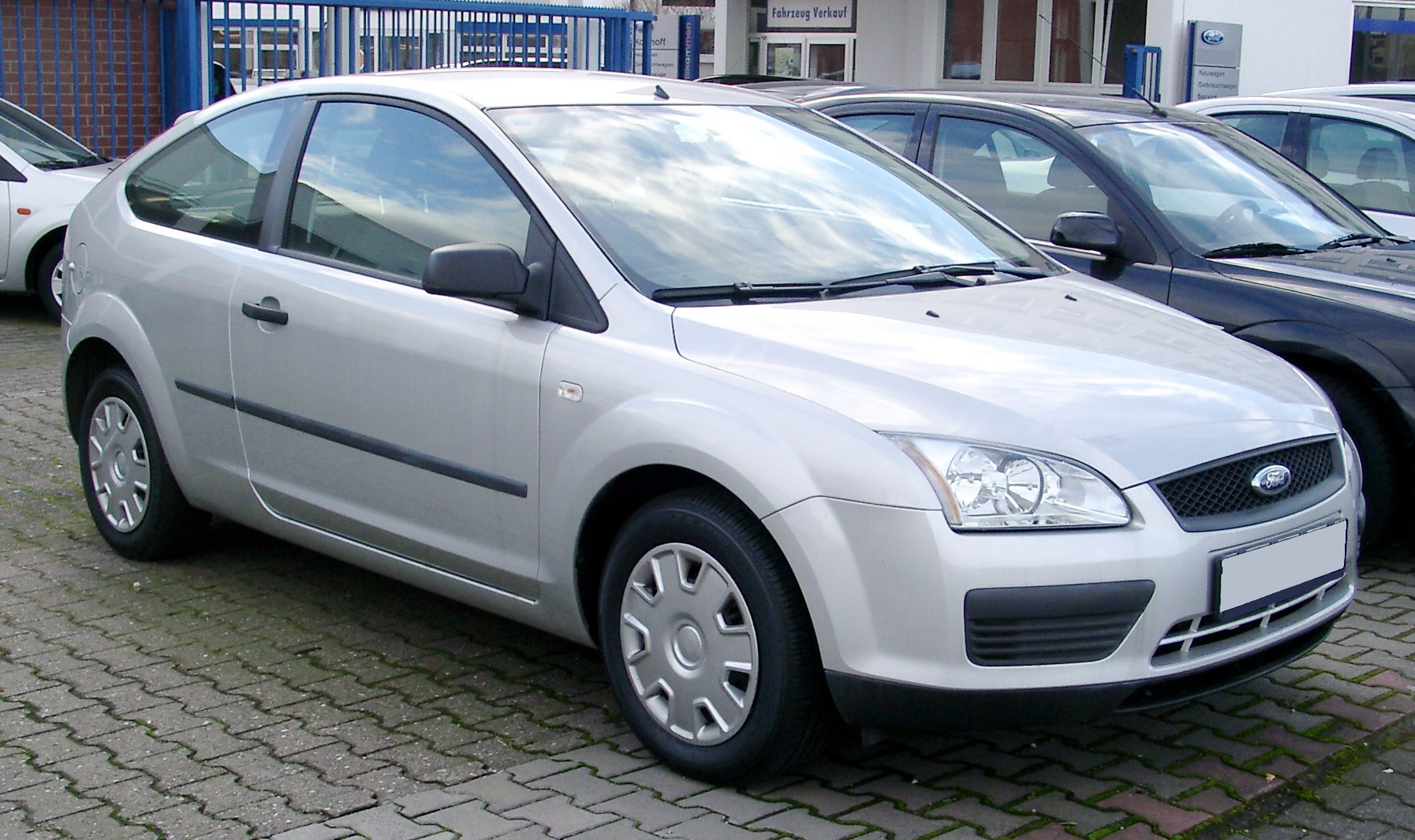

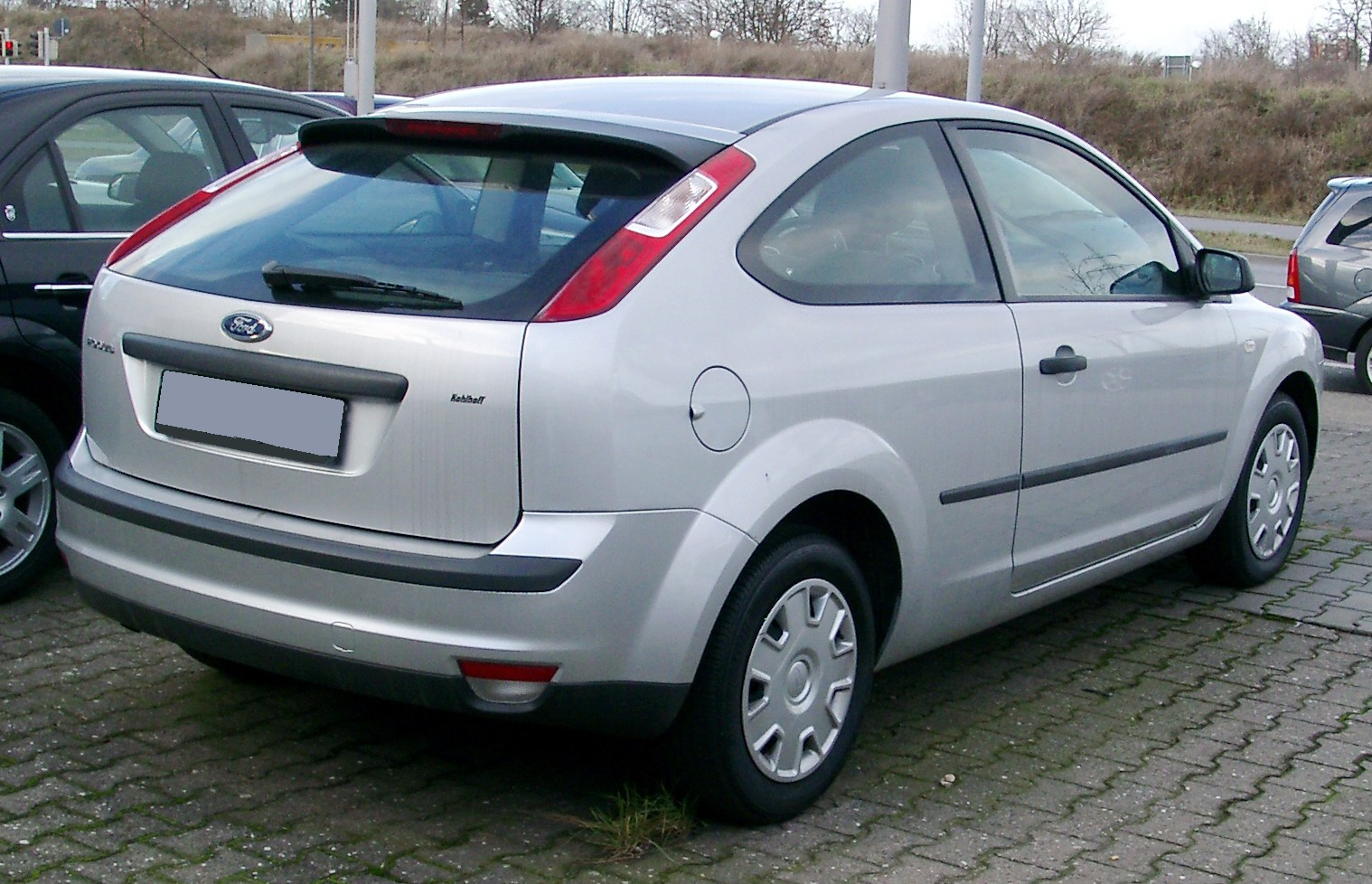
3-door hatchback (pre-facelift)

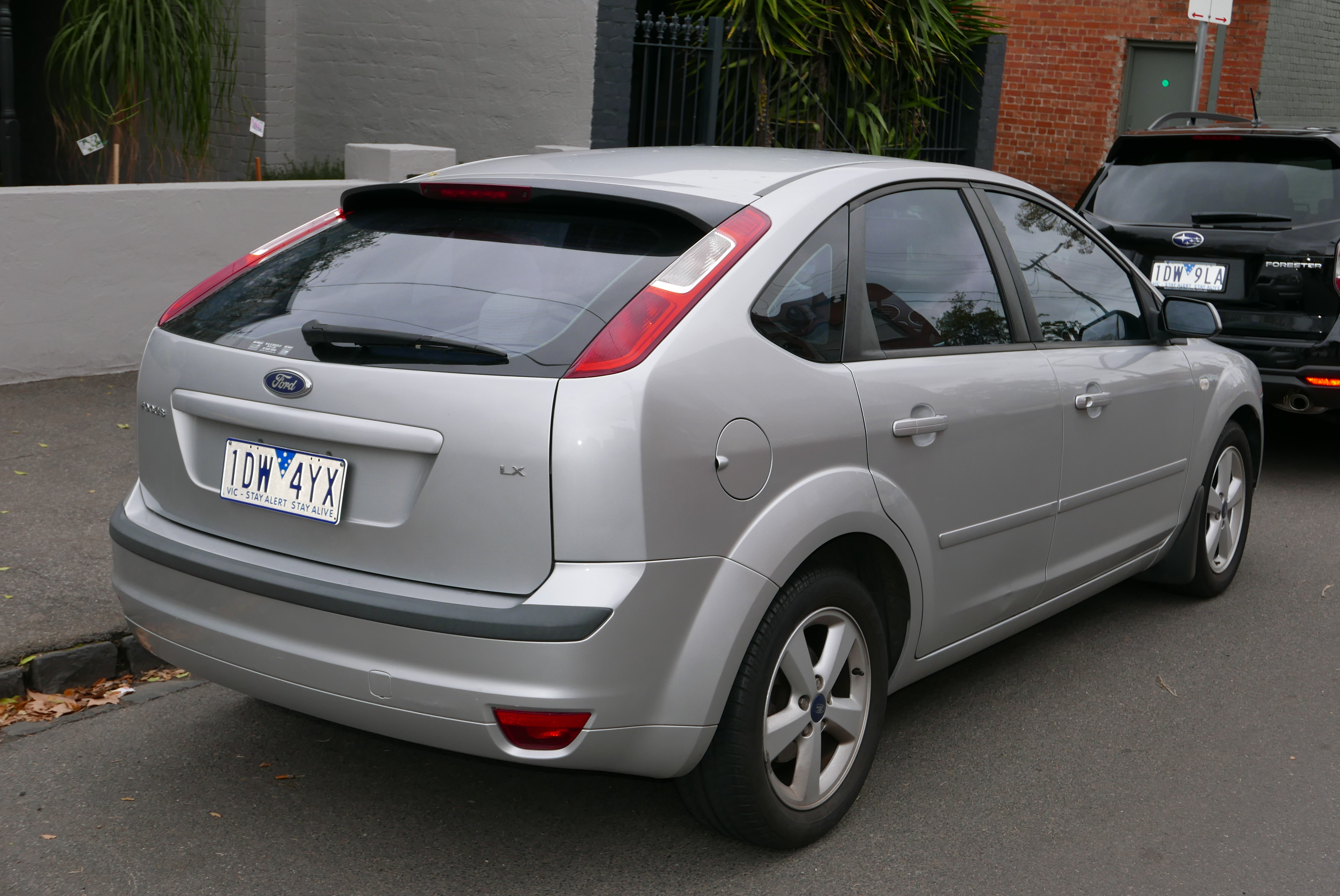
5-door hatchback (pre-facelift)

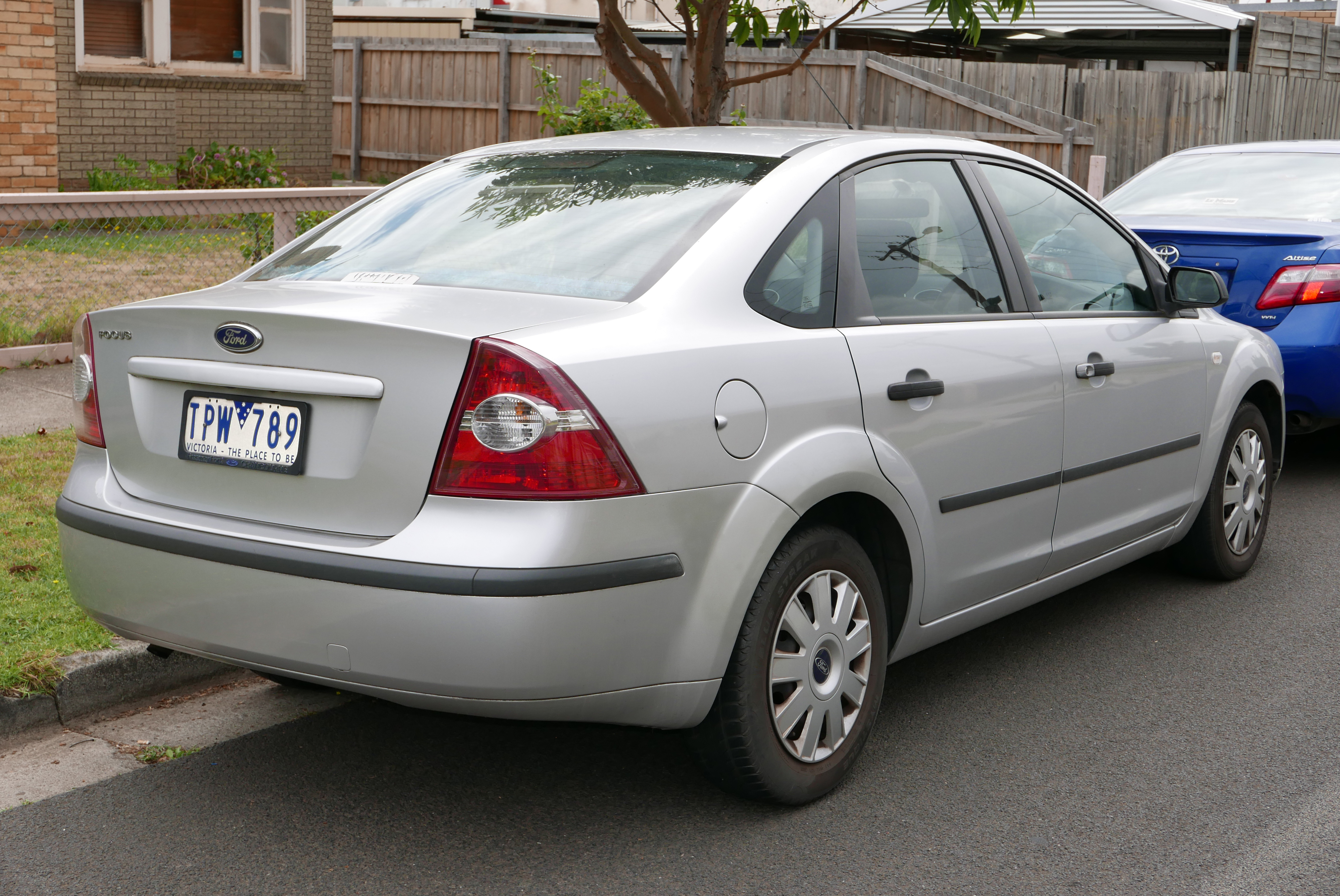
Sedan (pre-facelift)

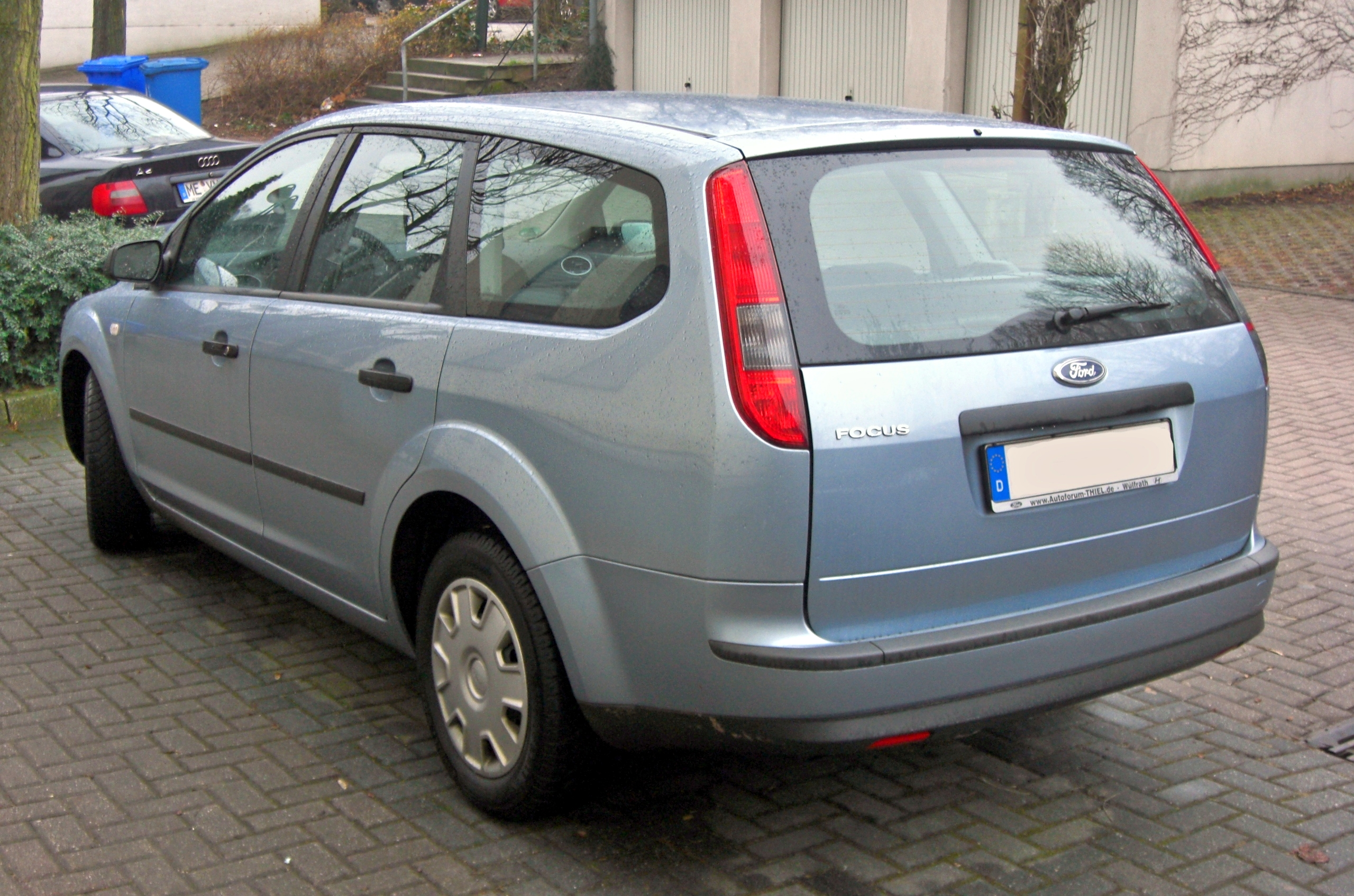
Turnier (pre-facelift)

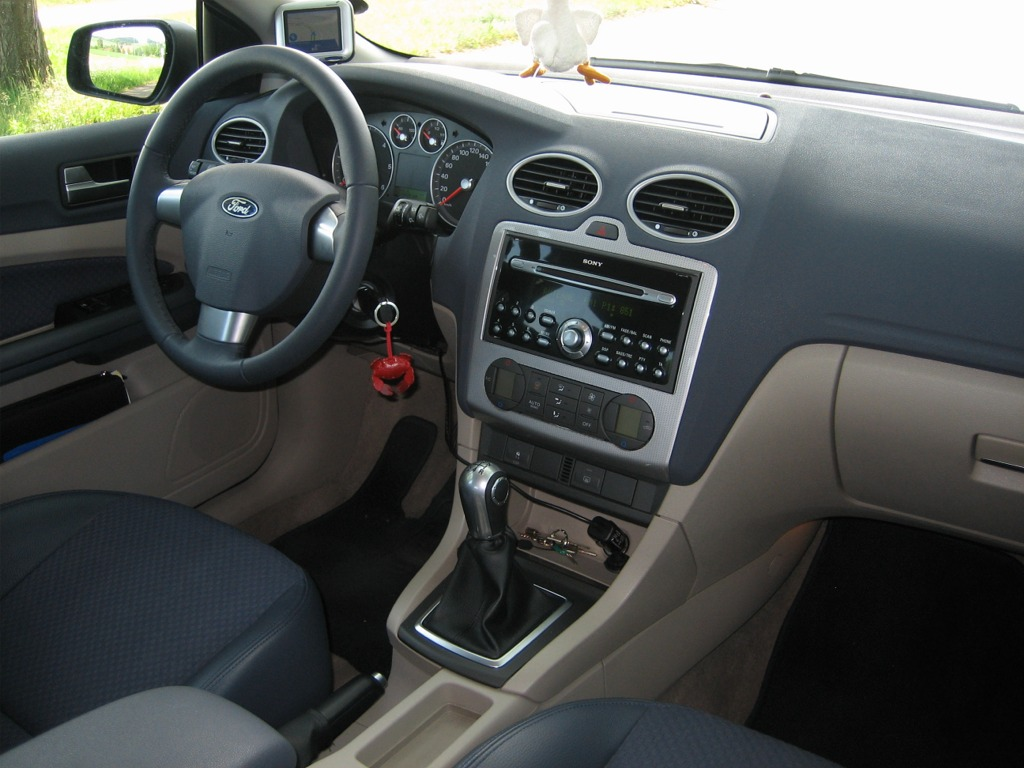
Interior

The main trim levels of the pre-facelift Focus Mk 2 in the United Kingdom are listed below. For other countries, the range is either a cut-down version of this list (e.g., for New Zealand) or it is almost completely different altogether (e.g., for South Africa, which uses trim levels Ambiente, Si and Trend, or Australia, which continues to use the old CL/LX/Zetec/Ghia trim levels)

- Studio (Base model)
- LX (as Studio, adds air-conditioning)
- Style (as LX, adds alloy-style wheel trims, front fog lights and a sports steering wheel)
- Sport (as Style, adds alloy wheels)
- Zetec (as Sport, adds Sport Suspension, sport seats and various interior/exterior styling enhancements)
- Zetec Climate (as Zetec, adds Quikclear heated front windscreen)
- Ghia (adds auto-dimming rear-view mirror, Quikclear heated front windscreen, front fog lights, a number of interior styling enhancements and only model to have cruise control as standard)
- Titanium (adds Sony CD/MP3 player as standard, privacy glass and sports seats)

From September 2006, Ford revised the standard trim specifications slightly, to allow for the introduction of further options called X-Packs.

=== Brazil ===
- GL (2009–2013) (Sigma 1.6 flexfuel 116cv), 5-door hatchback, 4-door sedan.
- GLX (2009–2013) (Sigma 1.6 flexfuel 116cv, Duratec HE 2.0 flexfuel 148cv), 5-door hatchback, 4-door sedan.
- Ghia (2009–2010) (Duratec HE 2.0 flexfuel 148cv), 5-door hatchback, 4-door sedan.
- Titanium (2011–2013) (Duratec HE 2.0 flexfuel 148cv), 5-door hatchback, 4-door sedan.

=== China ===
In the People's Republic of China, the Focus has been built by Chang'an Ford since April 2005. It is available as a five-door hatchback or four-door saloon. Engines are 1.8 and 2.0 petrol.

=== Argentina ===
- •Trend (2008–2013) Sigma 1.6 110cv, TDCi 1.8 Turbo Diesel. 5-Door Hatchcback. 5 Speed manual transmission
- •EXE Trend (2008–2013) Sigma 1.6 110cv, TDCi 1.8 Turbo Diesel. 4-Door Sedan. 5 Speed manual transmission
- •Trend Plus (2008–2013) Duratec HE 2.0 140cv, TDCi 1.8 Turbo Diesel. 5-Door Hatchback. 5 Speed manual transmission
- •EXE Trend Plus (2008–2013) Duratec HE 2.0 140cv, TDCi 1.8 Turbo Diesel. 4-Door Sedan. 5 Speed manual transmission
- •Ghia (2008–2013) Duratec HE 2.0 140cv, TDCi 1.8 Turbo Diesel. 5-Door Hatchback. 5 Speed manual transmission/4 Speed Automatic
- •EXE Ghia (2008–2013) Duratec HE 2.0 140cv, TDCi 1.8 Turbo Diesel. 4-Door Sedan. 5 Speed manual transmission/4 Speed Automatic

== 2008 facelift ==
=== LT ===
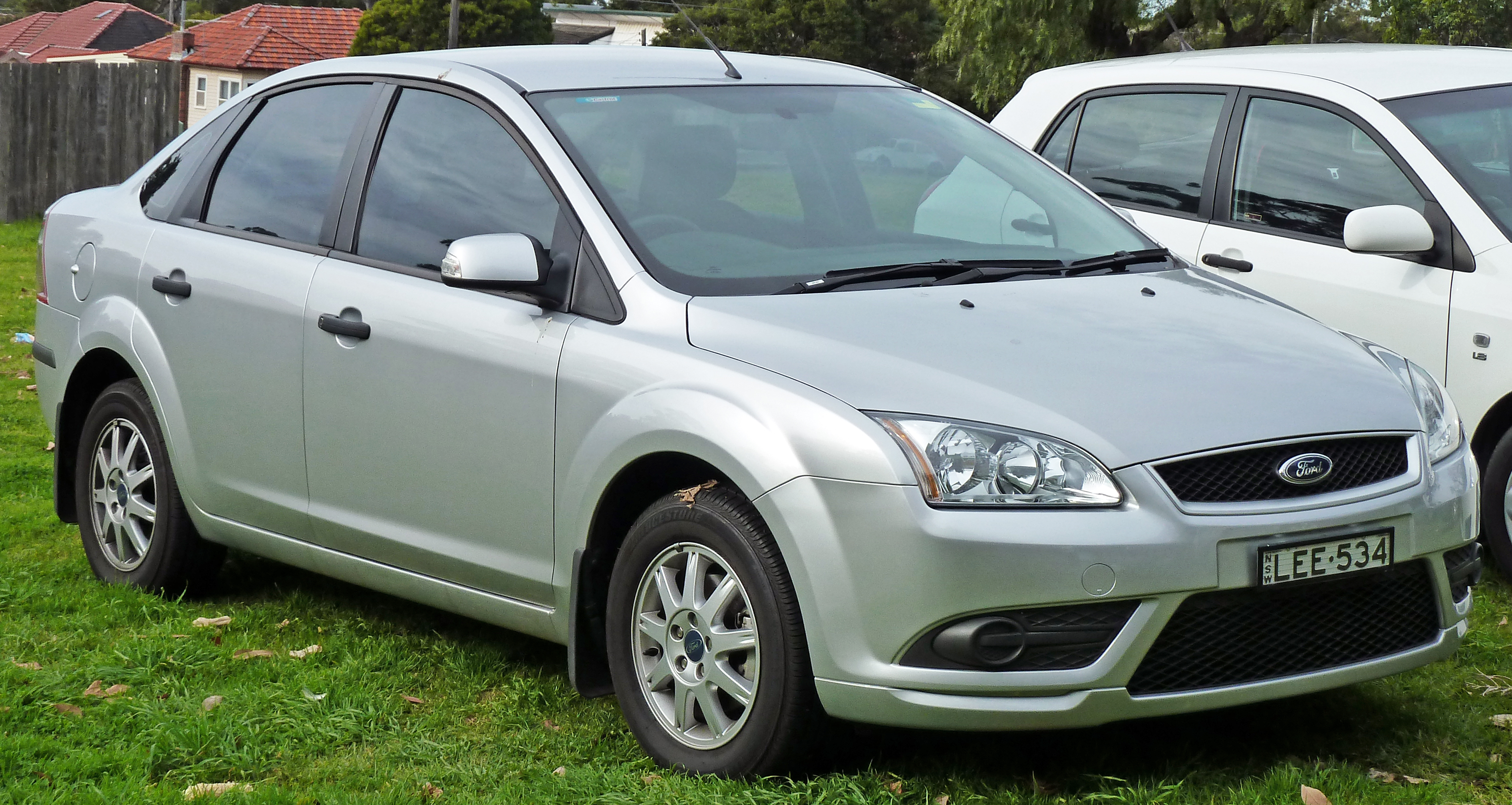
LT Ford Focus CL

A minor facelift of the Mk2 Focus went on sale in Australia, China, and South Africa in 2008. Part of the update included a new front bumper that was shared with the Cabriolet/Coupe, integrated indicators into the side mirrors and new style alloys for Zetec and Ghia models. All models also received dual airbags and ABS with EBD standard, as well as the addition of new safety packages which included; front side airbags, curtain airbags, stability & traction control and Emergency Brake Assist.

=== (Mk2.5 or LV) ===
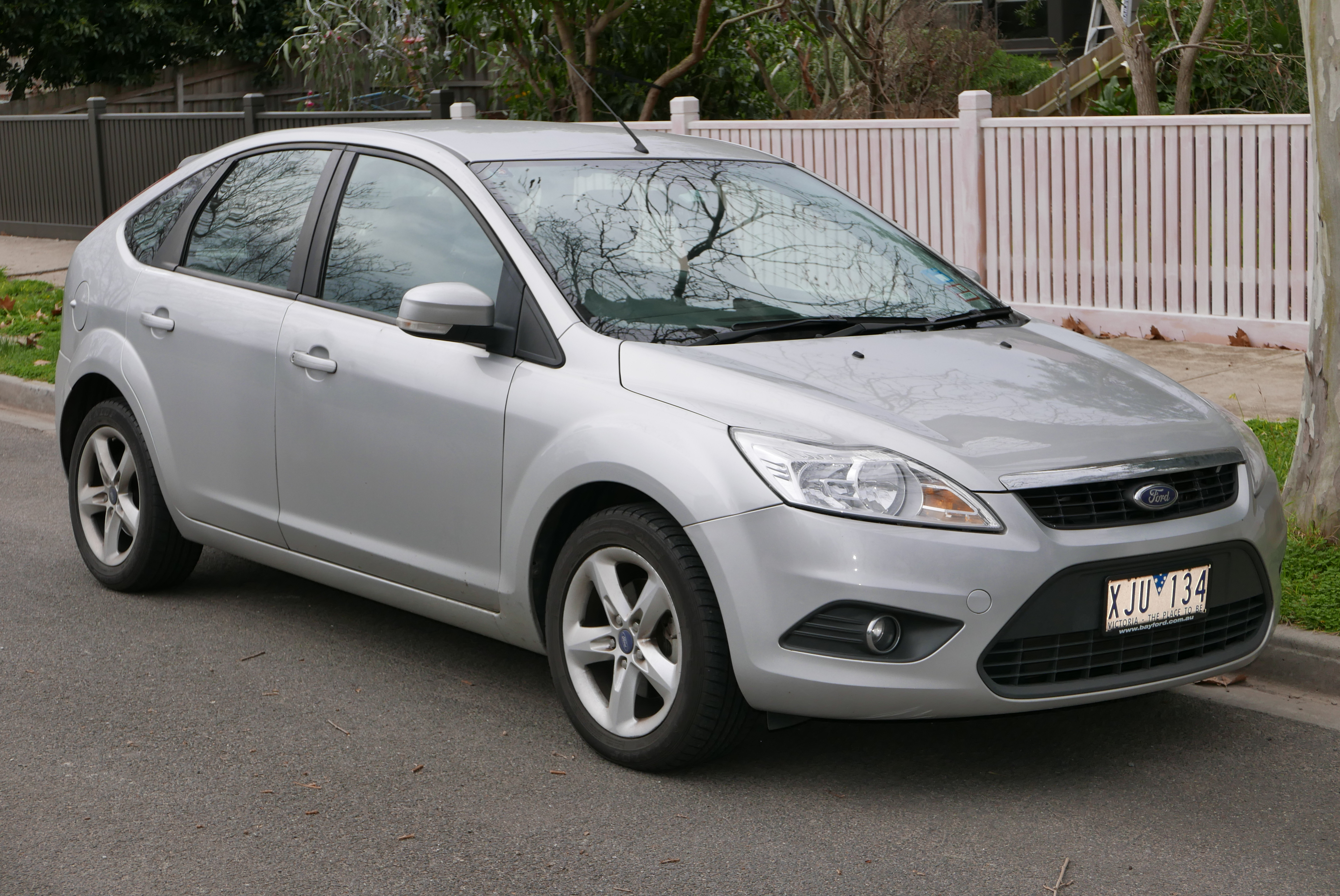

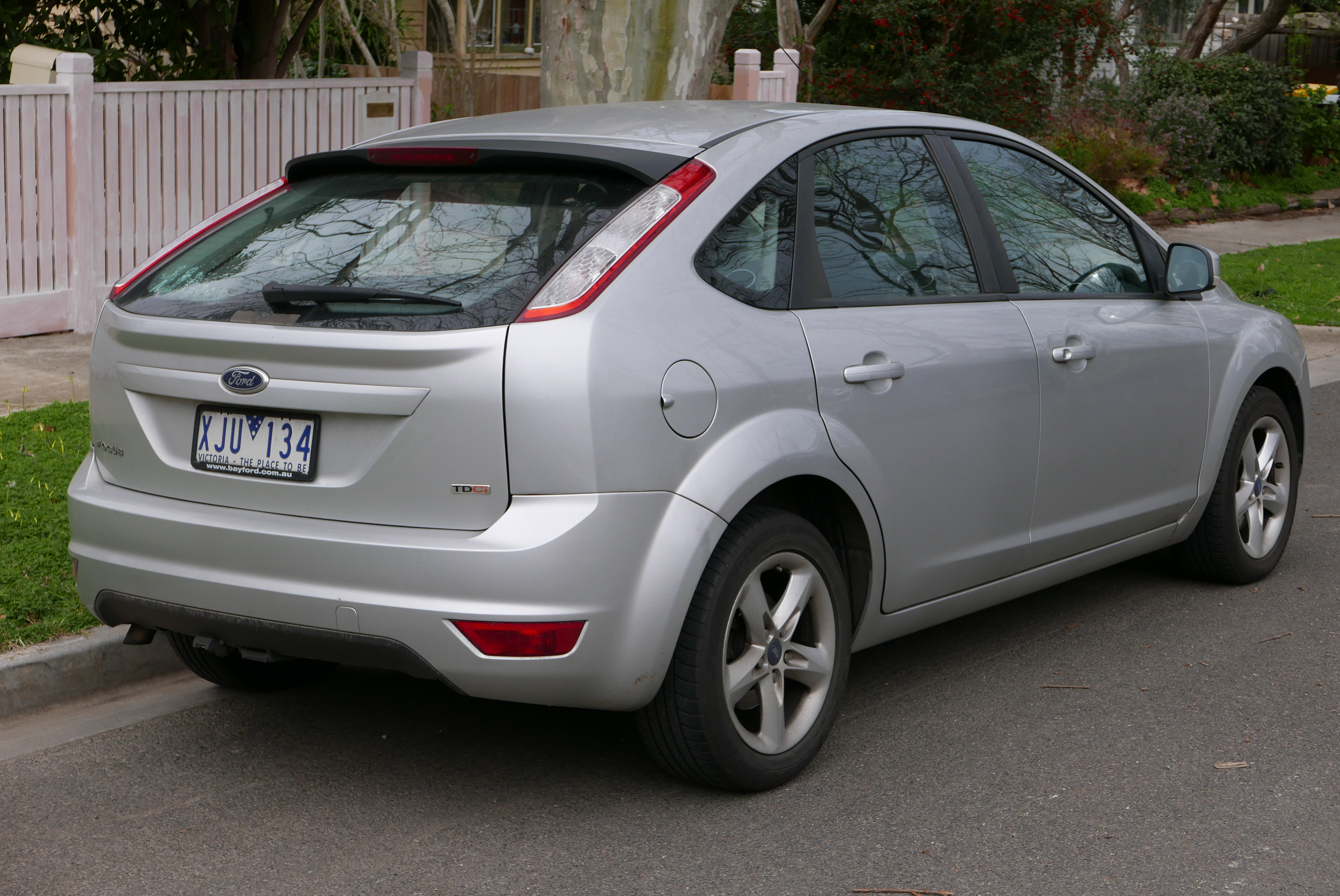
Ford Focus TDCi 5-door (facelift)

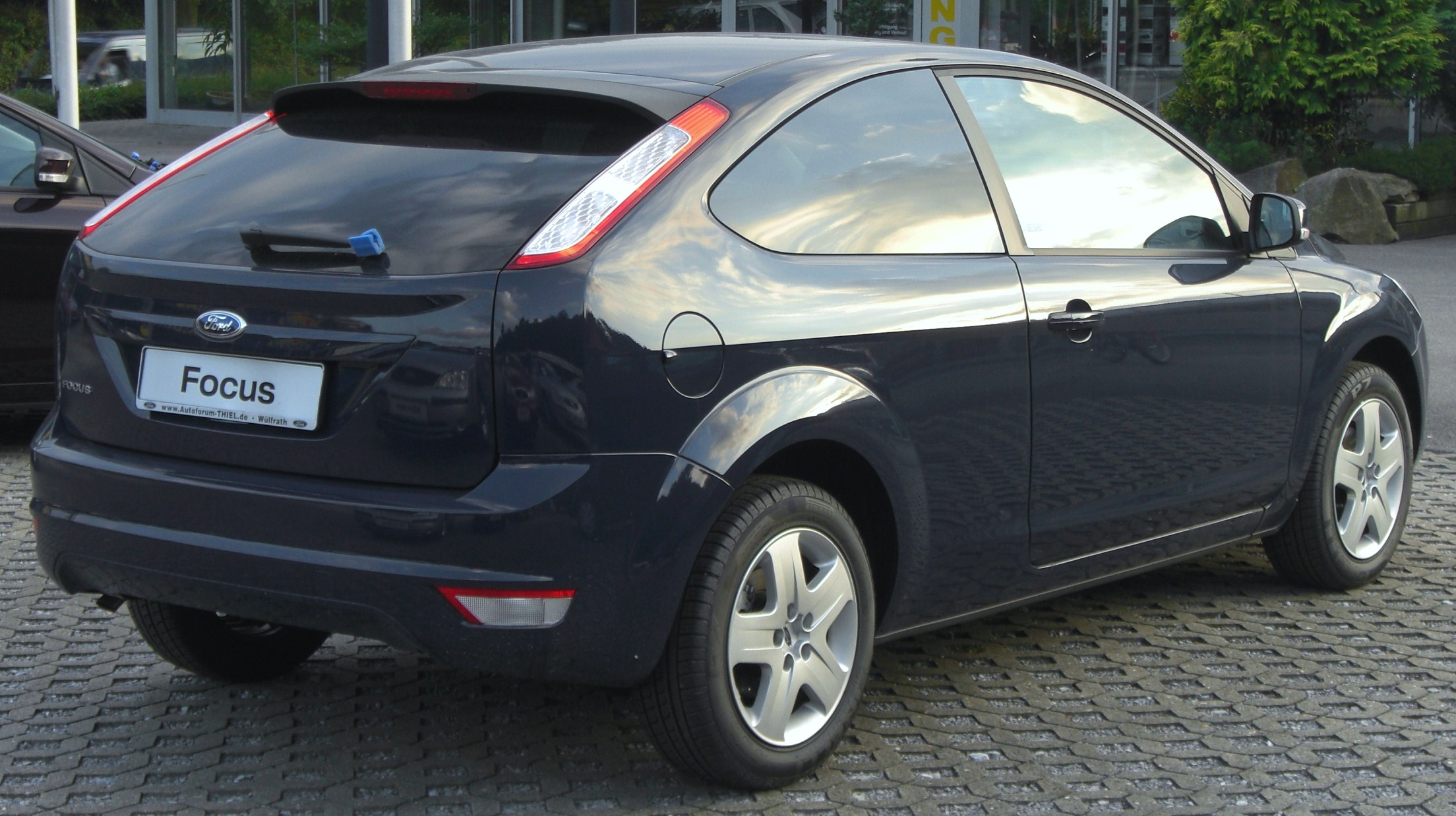
Ford Focus 3-door (facelift)

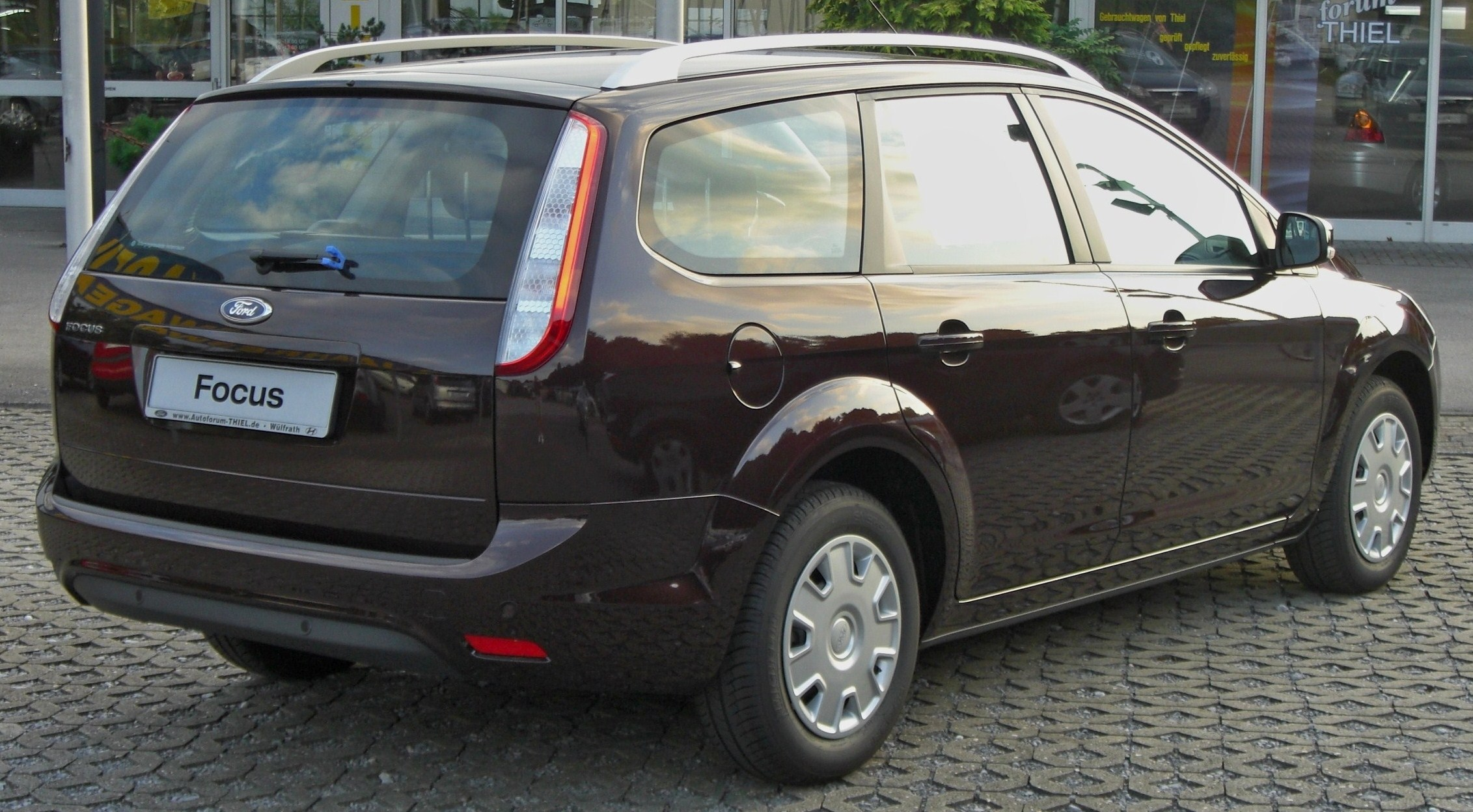
Ford Focus Turnier (facelift)

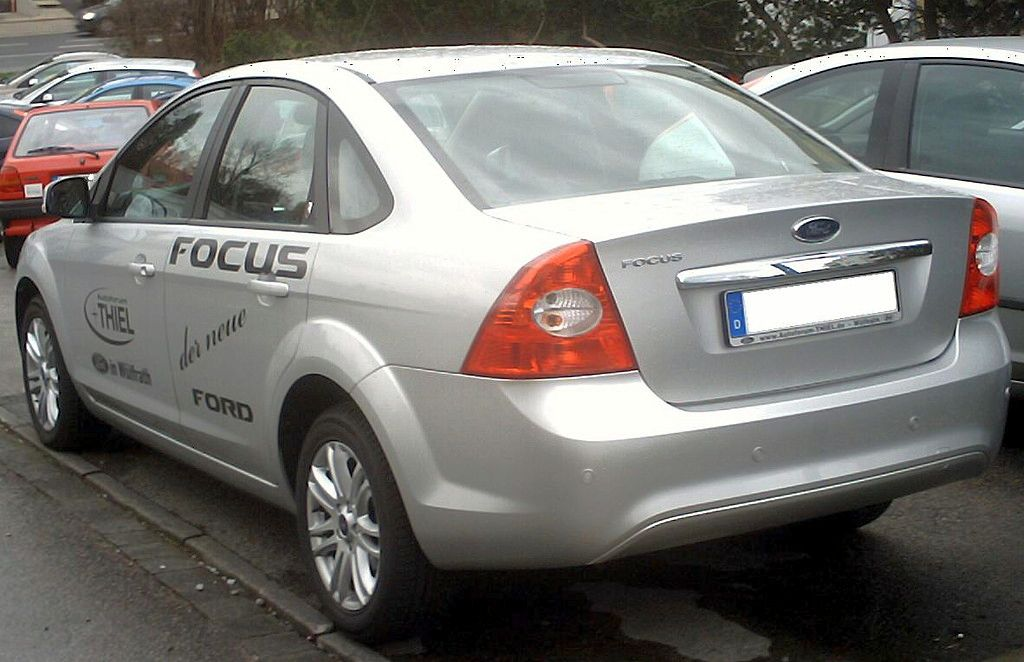
Ford Focus Sedan (facelift)

Ford unveiled a facelifted Mk2 Ford Focus at the Frankfurt Motor Show in September 2007. Sales began in the United Kingdom in February 2008. Changes include:

- Cosmetically, the facelift brings the Focus in line with the Kinetic Design language seen on the 2007 Ford Mondeo, 2006 Ford S-Max and Ford Galaxy, whilst keeping with the general shape of the pre-facelift model. Every exterior panel (except the roof) underwent a reworking with the following key detail changes: trapezoidal grilles, swept-back headlamps, bold wheel arches, newly shaped rear glass, a contoured tailgate, new tail lamps, new rear reflector lights, and new rear bumper.
- Greater use of soft-touch plastics in the interior
- Revised instrument binnacle and interior controls, now with red lighting
- New design centre console primarily for the top line Titanium trim and optional Zetec
- Ford PowerShift transmission (similar to Volkswagen's DSG) added to range
- Introduction of a Ford Power Button
- Introduction of a 110PS version of the 2.0 Duratorq TDCi engine.
- Revised trim range consisting of Studio, Style, ECOnetic, Zetec, Titanium, ST – 1, ST – 2 and ST – 3 trims.

Late 2008 saw the introduction of the 'Zetec S' trim, adding a body kit of front and rear spoilers, side skirts and the large roof spoiler from the ST. It includes aluminium pedals, a silver hand brake cover, and an optional WRC pack that adds flag decals and WRC scuff plates.

Compared to the pre-facelift Focus, prices were at least £250 higher, due to stability control becoming standard (it was previously an option), but remained similar to those of the pre-facelift model, as Ford attempted to claim back the lead at the top of the British car sales, gained by the Vauxhall Astra in the previous years.

Ford collaborated with singer and Strictly Come Dancing Winner Alesha Dixon in January 2008 to create an exclusive special edition remix and video to celebrate the launch of the new Ford Focus.

In June 2009, Ford stopped selling the Focus Saloon in the United Kingdom and the rest of Western Europe, but sales continued until 2011 in LHD markets such as Continental Europe, Eastern Europe, Russia, China and Taiwan, as well as in RHD markets such as South Africa, Ireland and Australia. Production went on until 2014 for countries such as Brazil, China and Argentina, where the Focus continued to be sold as the Focus Classic or Focus.

In January 2010, the Focus III Saloon was revealed.

== Additional variants ==
=== Focus ST ===
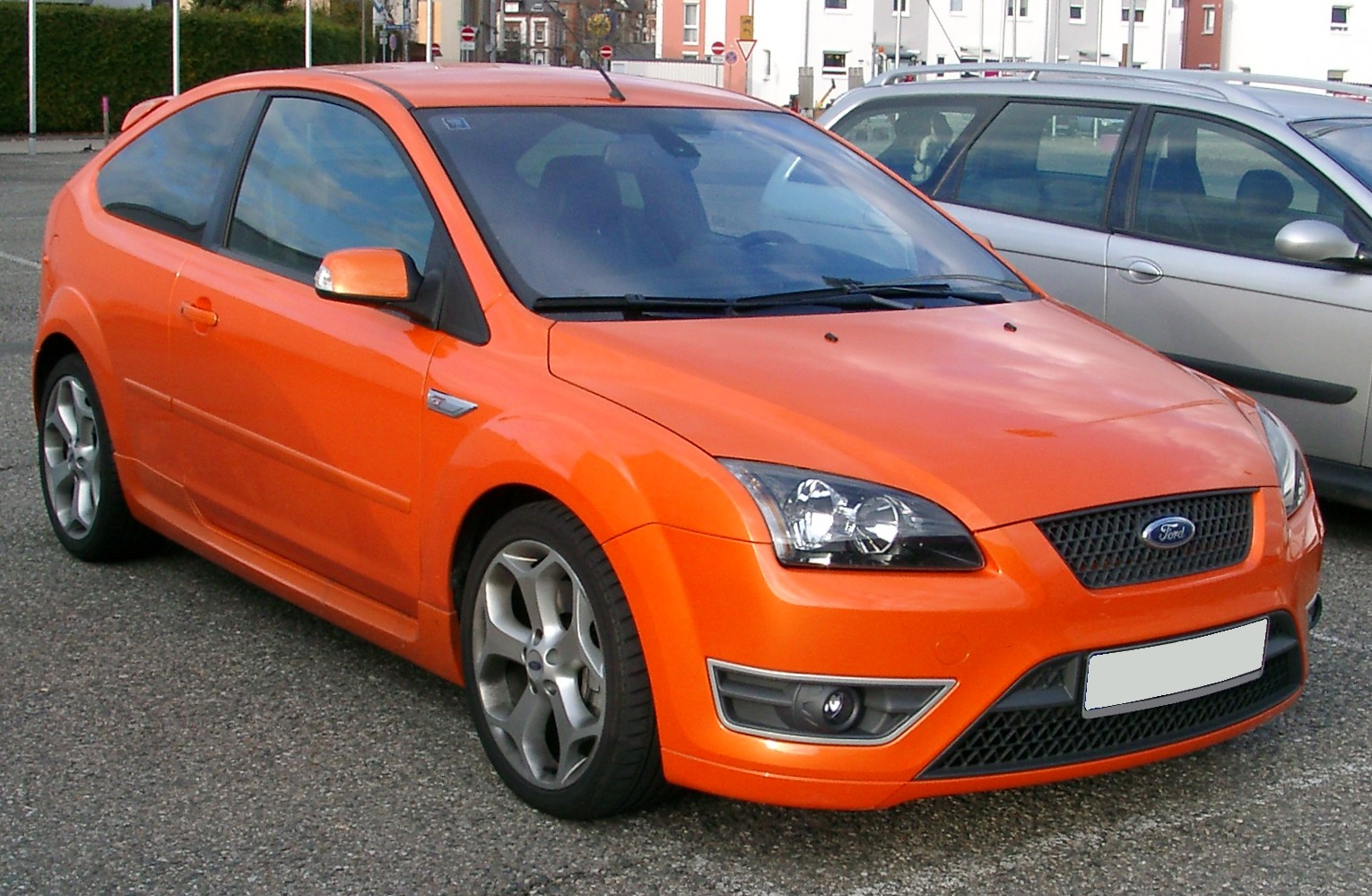
The early model Ford Focus ST 3-door hatchback

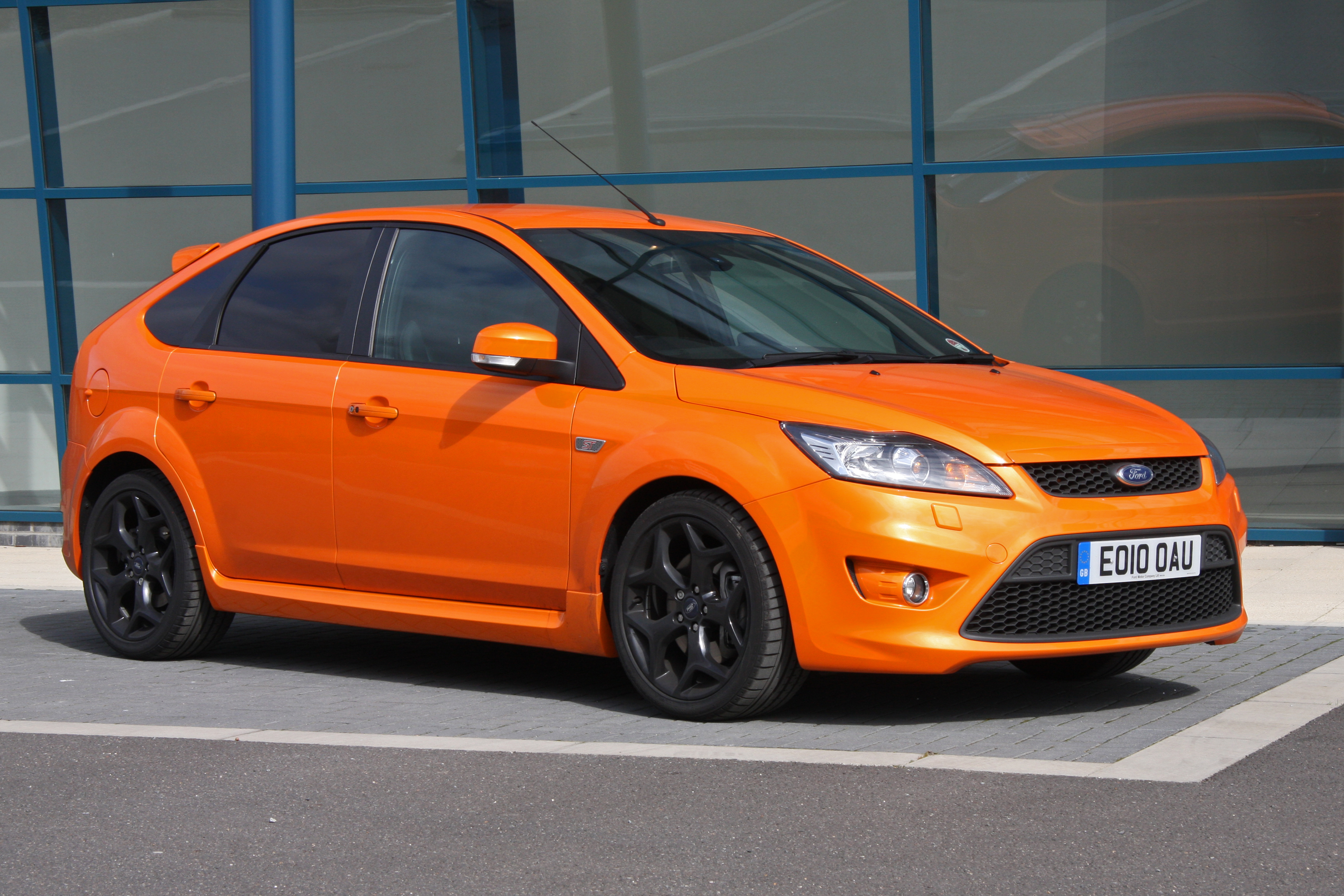
The facelift Ford Focus ST (Europe), or XR5 (Australia and New Zealand) 5-door hatchback

In 2005, Ford unveiled a hot hatch version of the Mk 2 Focus. Called Focus ST, and available in either three or five-door hatchback variant, the car uses the Volvo Modular engine from Volvo C30, a turbocharged 2.5 L 5-cylinder engine producing 225 hp (168 kW; 228 PS). Ford however rebadged it as the Ford Duratec ST, applied variable valve timing to both camshafts, applied a lighter flywheel and performed a throttle recalibration.

The Ford Focus Mk 2 ST is also known as the XR5 Turbo in the Australian and New Zealand market, but is sold as a five-door hatchback only. In 2008 Ford, in conjunction with Mountune Racing, unveiled a power upgrade kit which raises the power output to 260 bhp (190 kW). The kit consists of: a K&N panel filter, larger intercooler, and a remap. Although the platform is the same, no saloon or estate version was ever released.

=== Coupé-Cabriolet ===
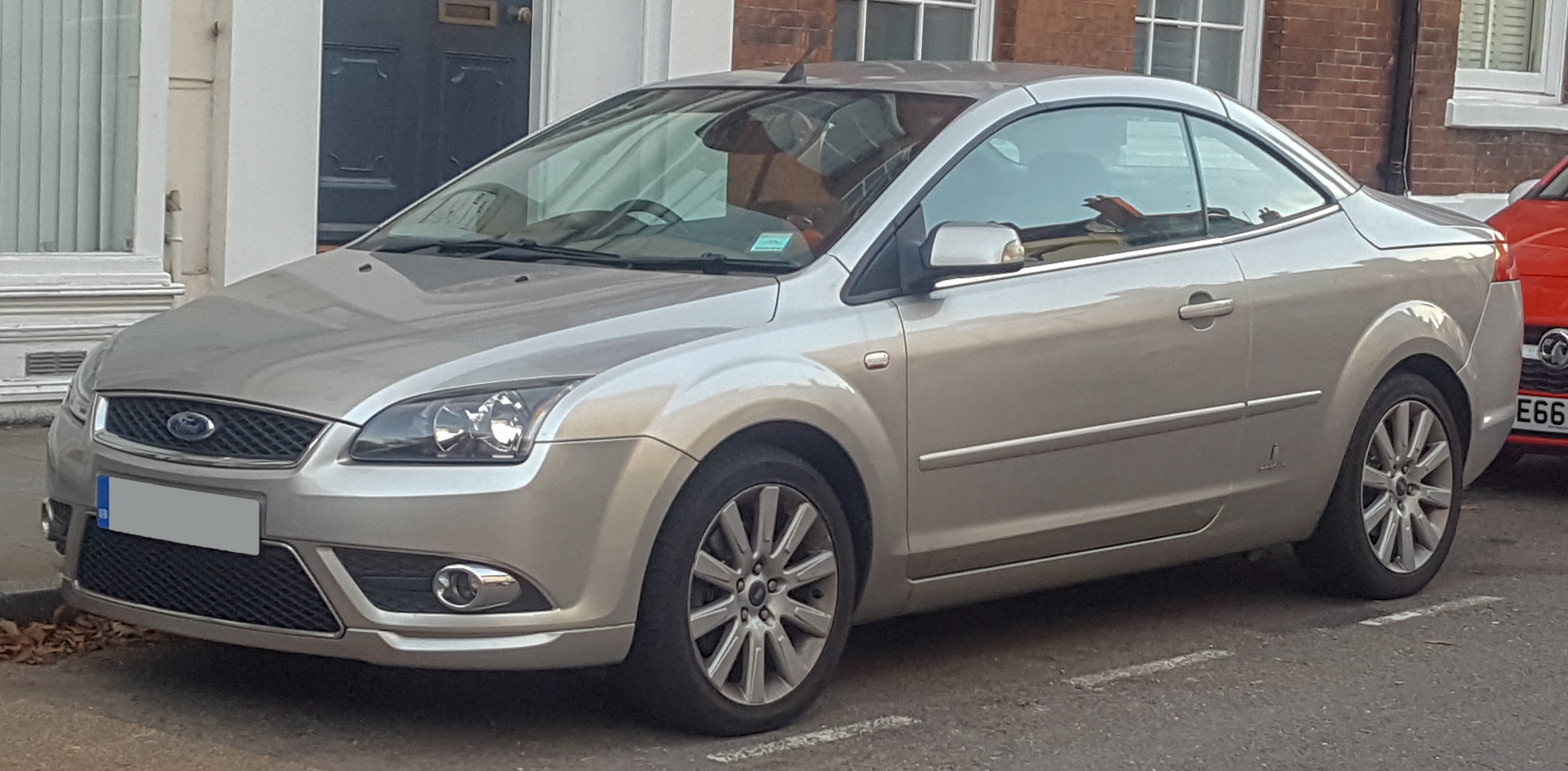

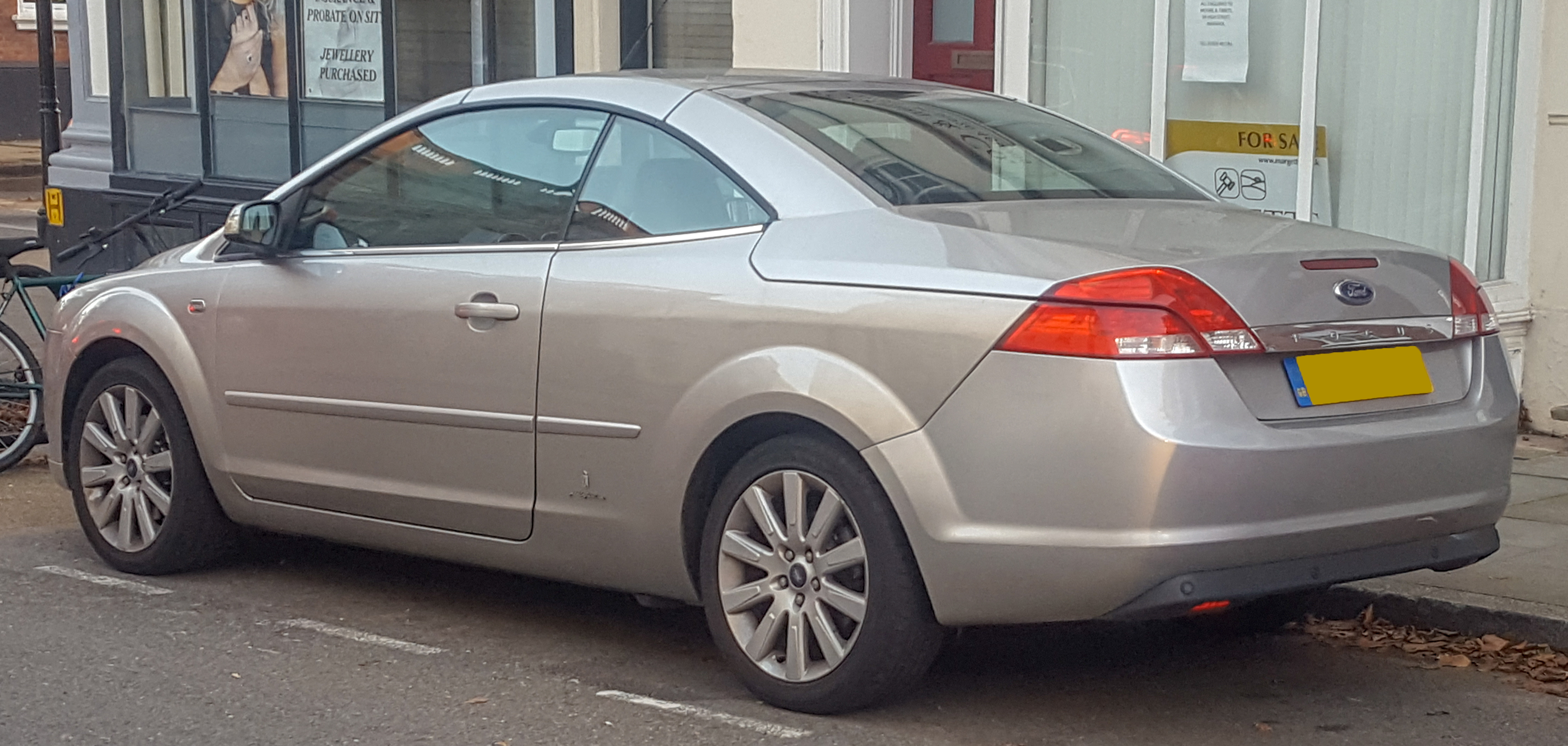
Ford Focus Coupé-Cabriolet

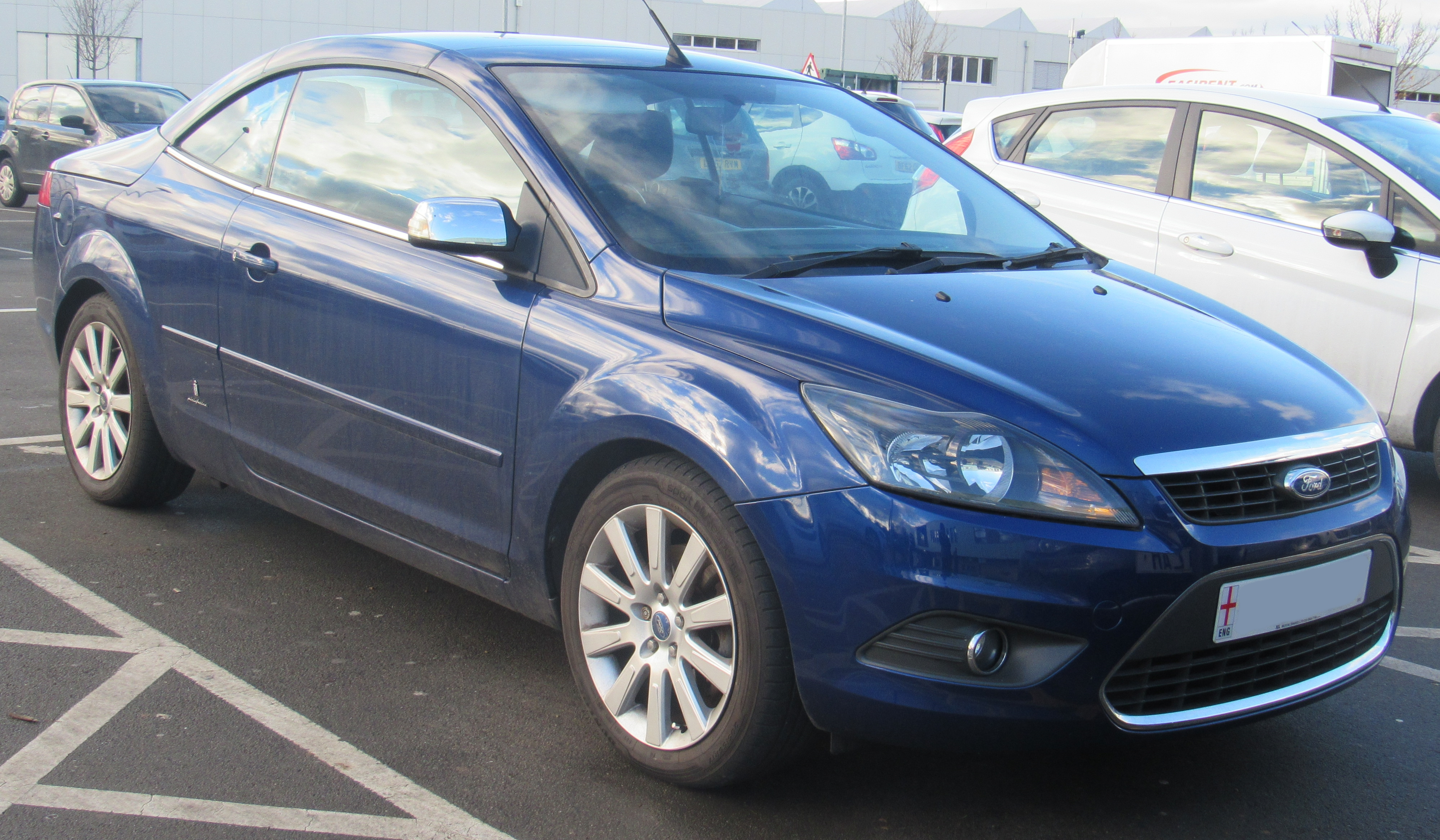

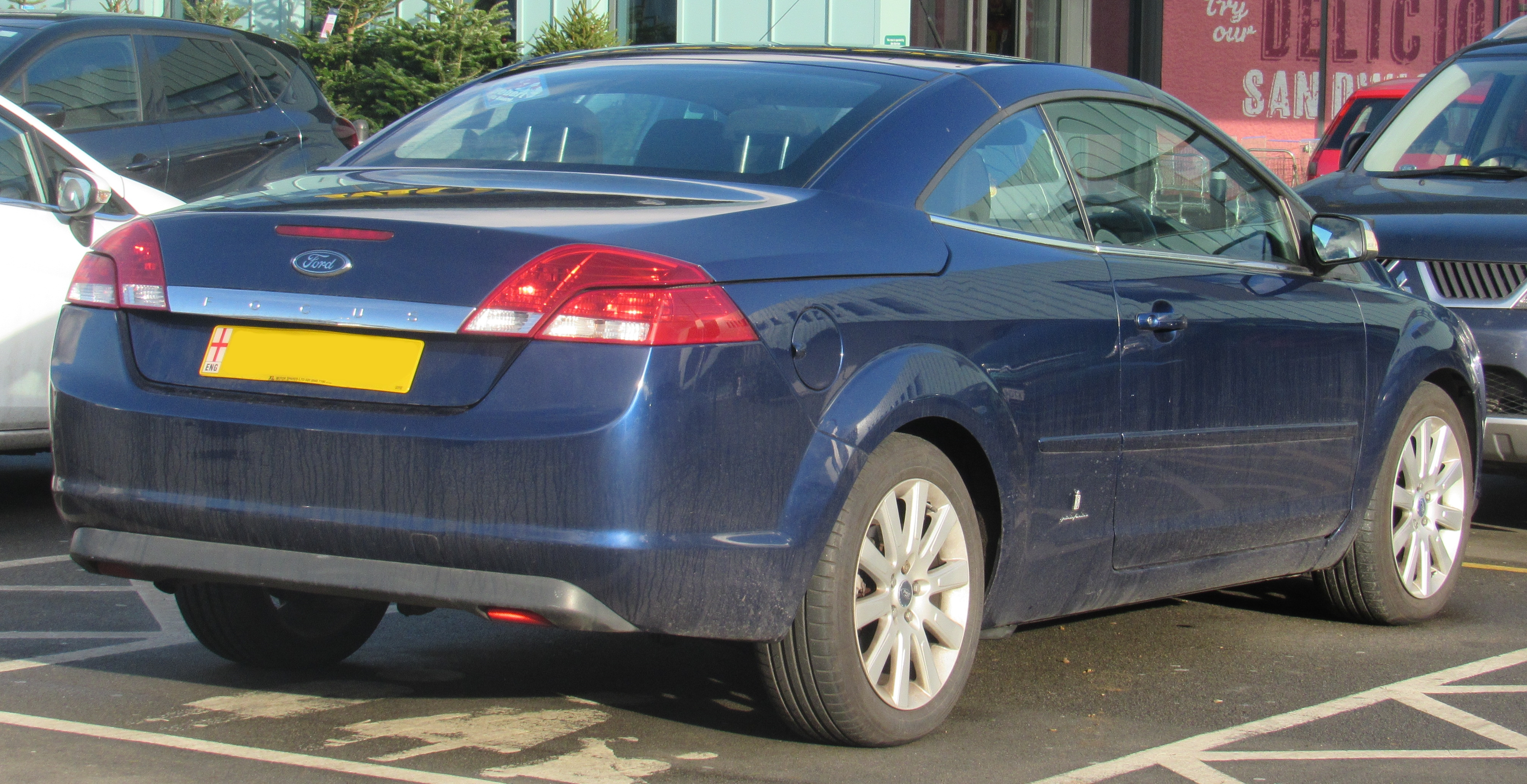
Ford Focus Coupé-Cabriolet facelift

The Focus Coupé-Cabriolet, featuring a two-piece retractable hardtop, was introduced at the Geneva Motor Show in February 2006 and went on sale in October 2006. Originally, it was previewed at the 2005 Frankfurt Motor Show. Pininfarina performs final assembly.

In February 2008, Ford revealed a new Focus Coupé-Cabriolet sporting the new 'Kinetic Design' front end of the generic Ford Focus. Notably however, unlike the generic Focus models, the side and rear body panels were not changed, and neither were the door mirrors upgraded to the new-style units, as on the rest of the new Focus models. Nor were bodyside mouldings removed, as with the rest of the Focus range. Some press outlets had expected such changes in line with the rest of the range.

=== Focus ECOnetic ===
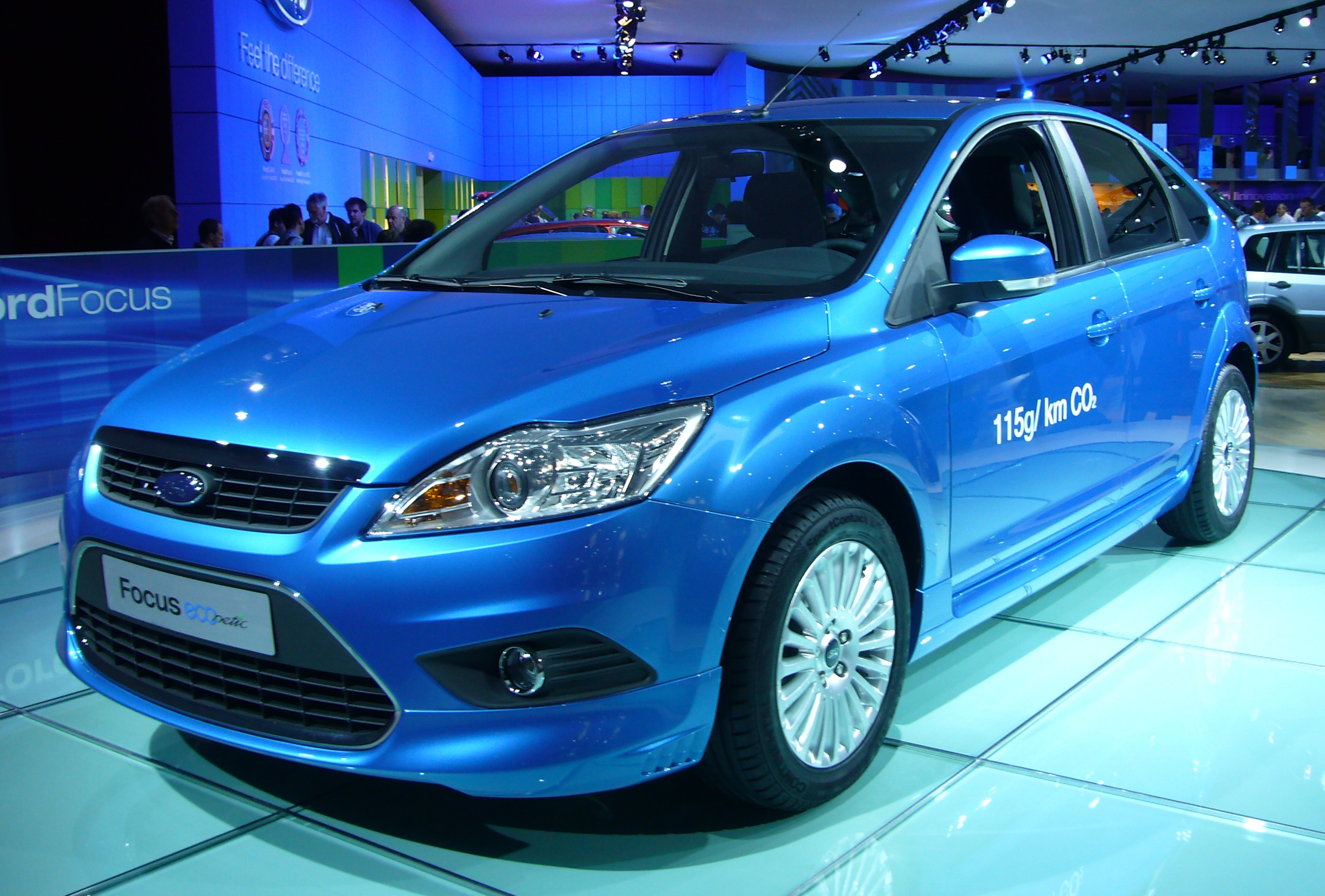
Ford Focus ECOnetic

Shown at the Frankfurt Motor Show in September 2007 as part of the facelifted range, the Focus ECOnetic is an emissions-friendly model, similar to Volkswagen's BlueMotion range, using a 109 PS 1.6 Duratorq TDCi engine with a Diesel Particulate Filter (DPF). Aerodynamic features including low-resistance tyres contribute to 65 mpg_{‑imp} (4.3 L/100 km; 54 mpg_{‑US}) fuel consumption figure with average CO_{2} emissions of 115g/km.

=== Focus X Road ===
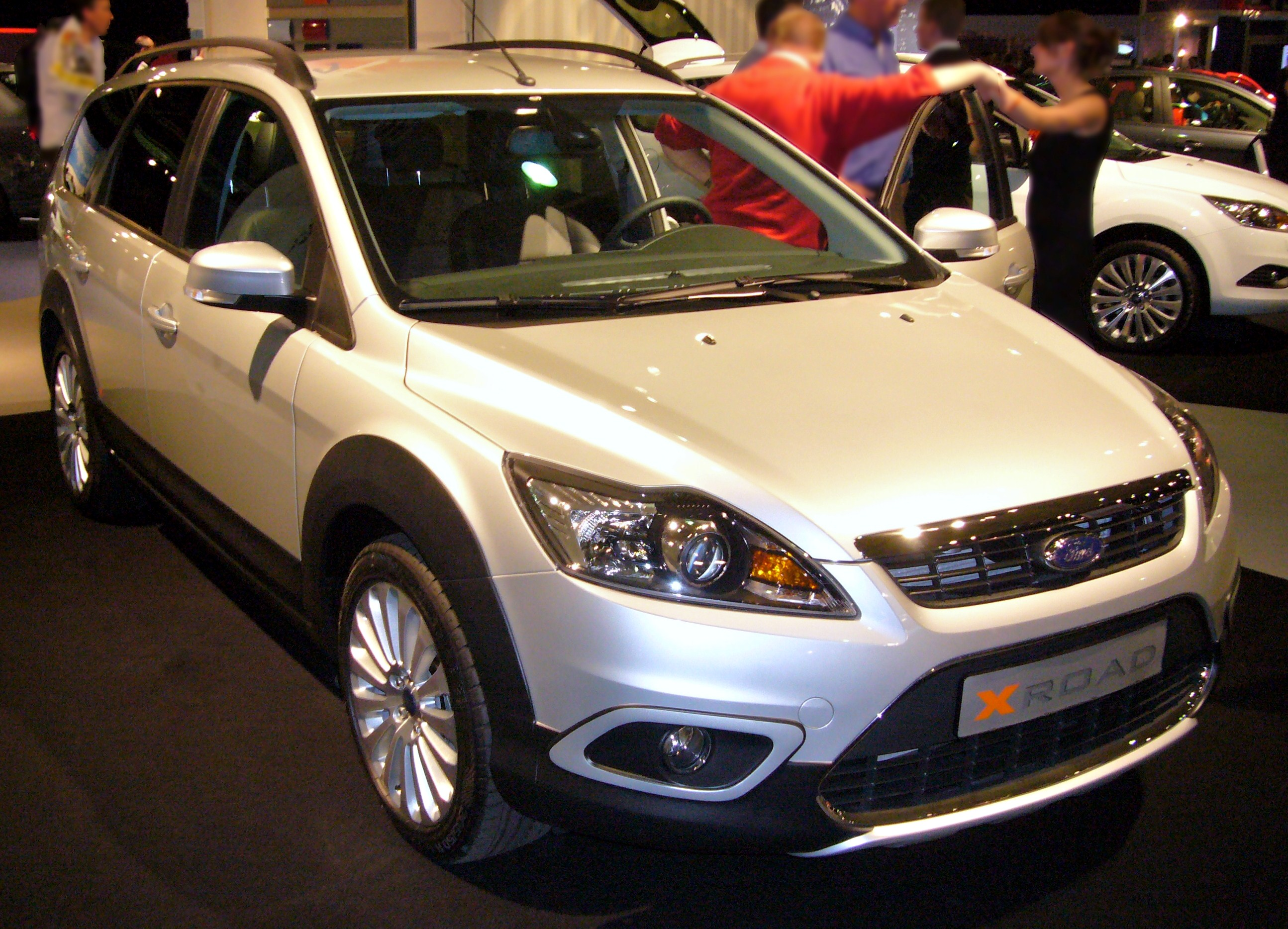
Ford Focus X Road

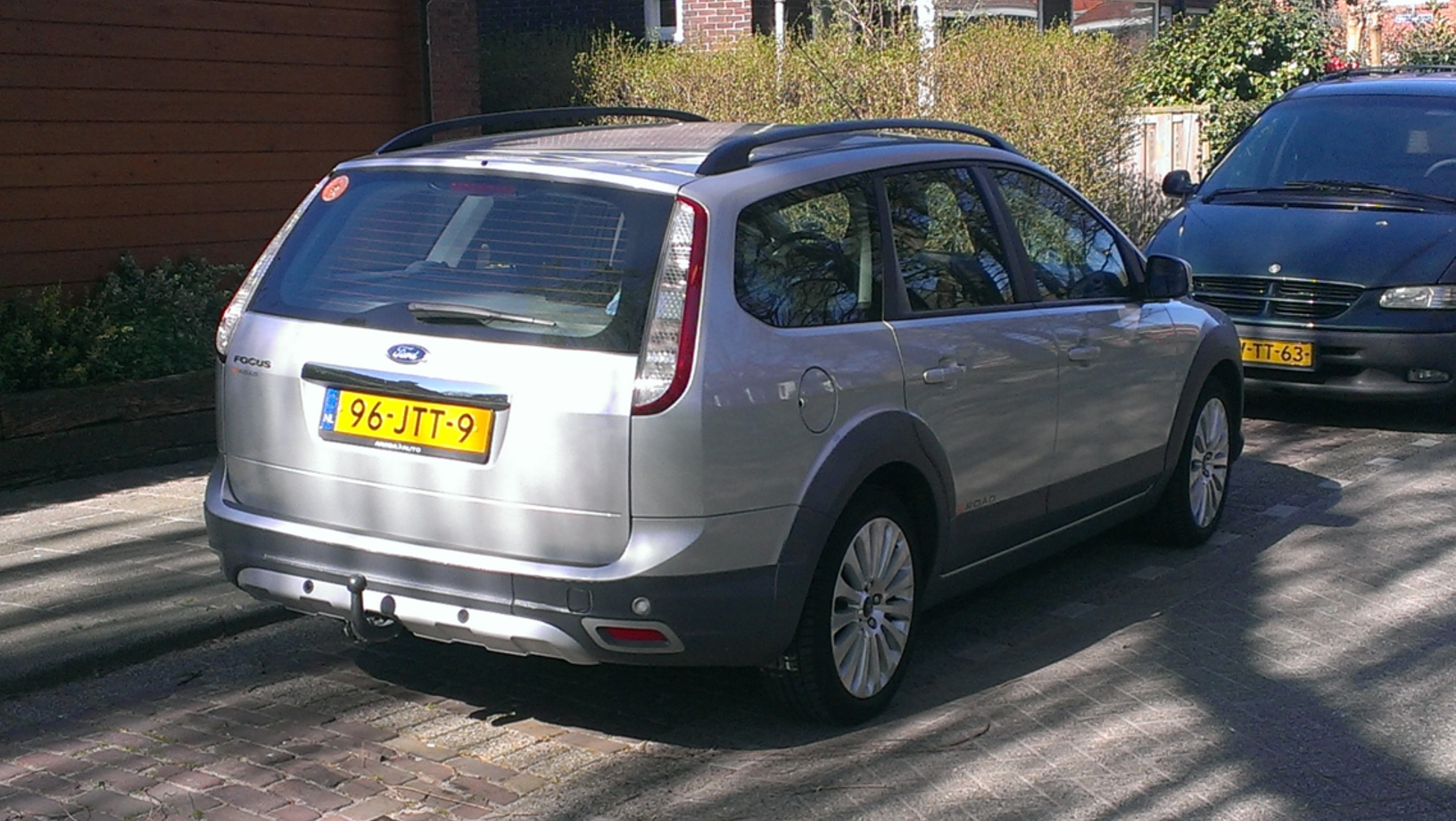
Ford Focus X Road

The Focus X Road, a Focus Wagon with crossover look which featured a new body kit consisting of revised front and rear bumpers with a matching black finish on the doors and side panels, was introduced at the AutoRAI Amsterdam in April 2009. The X Road was only available in The Netherlands with 1.8 Flexifuel engine and limited to 300 units. However, a month later the X Road also made its debut at the Barcelona International Motor Show and later made its debut in other left-hand drive countries with the regular petrol and diesel engines.

=== Focus RS Mk 2 ===
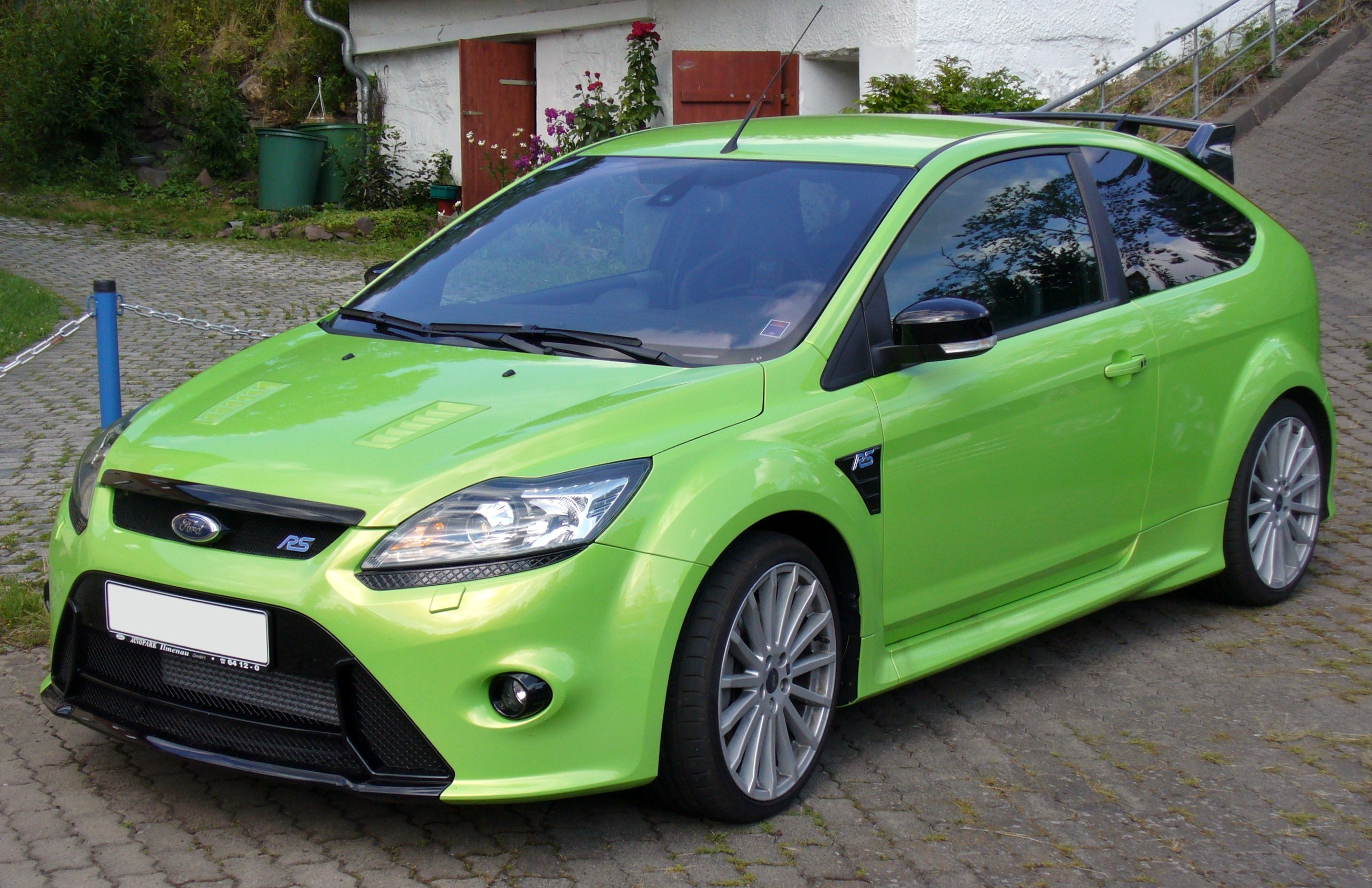

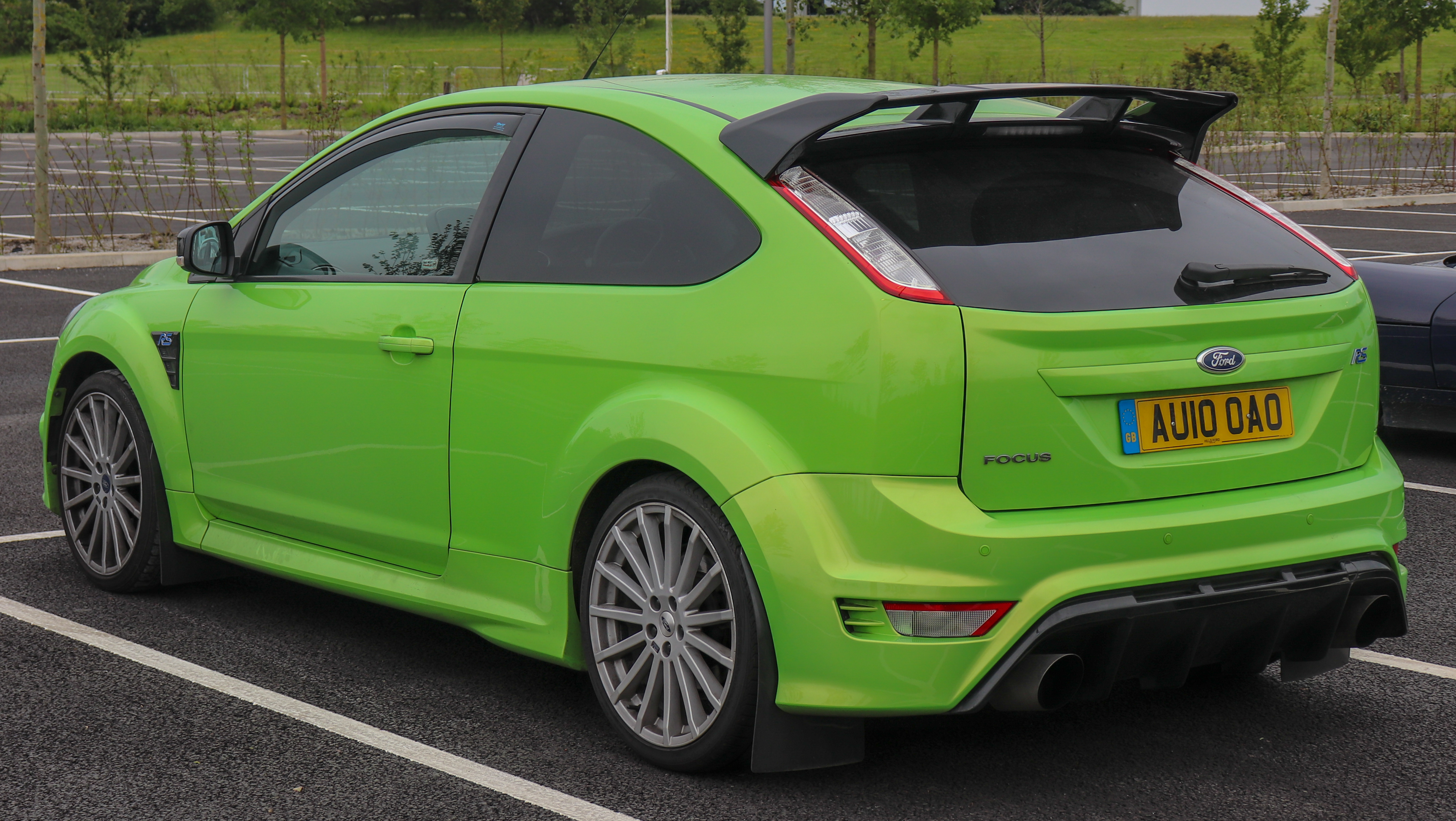
Ford Focus RS

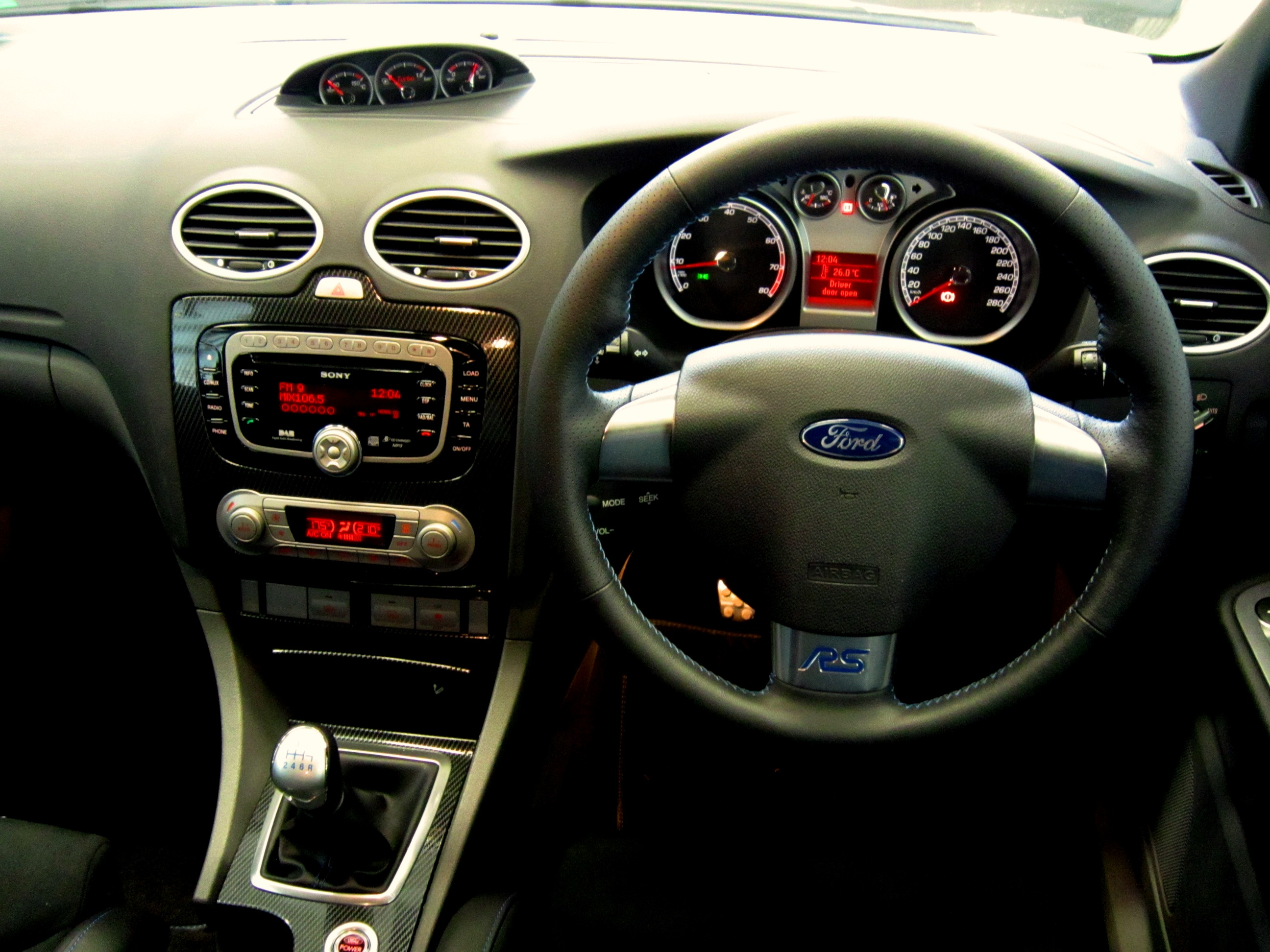
Focus RS interior

On December 17, 2007, Ford of Europe confirmed that a Mk 2 Focus RS would be launched in 2009. The press release also notes that a concept version of the RS is due in mid-2008. Contrary to numerous rumours and speculation the RS was announced by Ford to have a conventional FWD layout with an upgraded Duratec ST engine with 305PS Duratec RS, gearbox, suspension, and LSD. As announced, the Focus RS MK2 hit the road on 5 January 2009.

When Ford completed the production run of the Mk I, Ford of Britain's managing director Paul Thomas said "We always knew Focus RS would be a sales winner, but we could never have predicted its fantastic reception and the effect it had in re-igniting passion for the Ford RS brand."

In 2008, Ford revealed the new Focus RS in "concept" form at the British International Motor Show. The Duratec RS engine was upgraded to produce 305 PS (224 kW; 301 hp) at 6500 rpm and 440 N⋅m (325 lb⋅ft) of torque at 2250–4500 rpm. 0 to 100 km/h (62 mph) acceleration was quoted to be under 6 seconds. The RS uses a modified Volvo-engineered 2,522 cc (2.5 L; 153.9 cu in) straight-five engine found in the Focus ST. A larger BorgWarner K16 turbo now delivers up to 20.3 psi (1.40 bar) of boost. A new air-to-air intercooler has been developed as a complement, while the forged crankshaft, silicon-aluminum pistons, graphite-coated cylinder bores, a compression ratio of 8.5:1 and variable valve timing also up the power output. The car remains front wheel drive, but to reduce torque steer uses a Quaife Automatic Torque Biasing LSD, and a specially designed MacPherson strut suspension at the front called RevoKnuckle, which provides a lower scrub radius and kingpin offset than traditional designs while avoiding the increased weight and complexity of double wishbone and multi-link suspension setups. Ford UK claim: "It's as close as you'll come to driving a full-spec rally car (Ford Focus RS WRC).

- 0-62 miles per hour (100 km/h): 5.9 s
- Top speed: 263 kilometres per hour (163 mph)
- Kilometre from a standstill: 25.4 s (the fastest front wheel drive car in this particular exercise - this time was recorded by the Belgian magazine "Le Moniteur Automobile")

The rear features a large venturi tunnel and a spoiler. Focus RS is available in three exterior colours: Ultimate Green, Performance Blue and Frozen White. Focus RS has an exclusive 'Ultimate' Green classic 1970s Ford Le Mans Green of the Ford Escort RS1600 era.

=== Focus RS 500 ===
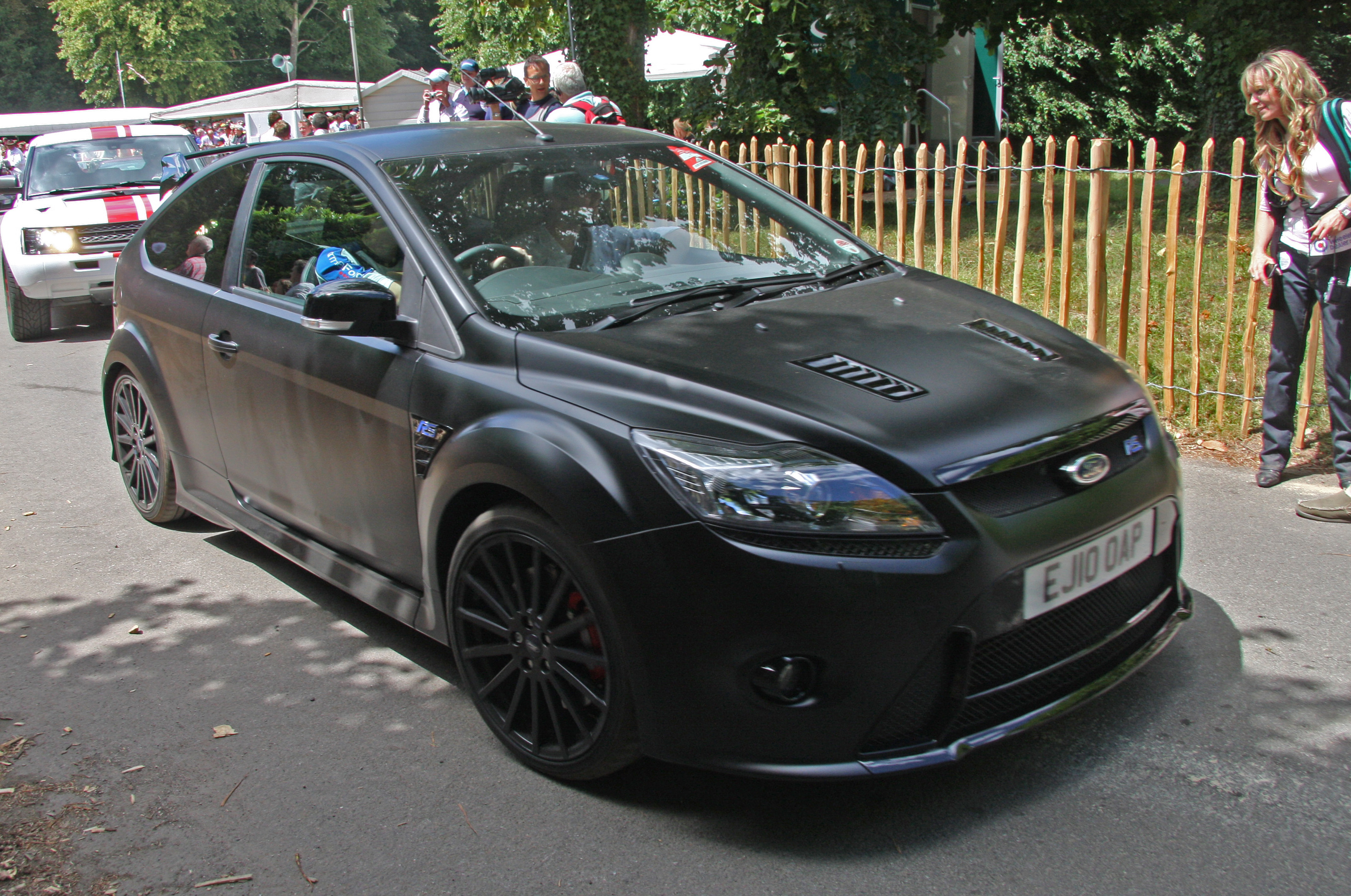
2010 Ford Focus RS 500 at the Goodwood Festival of Speed

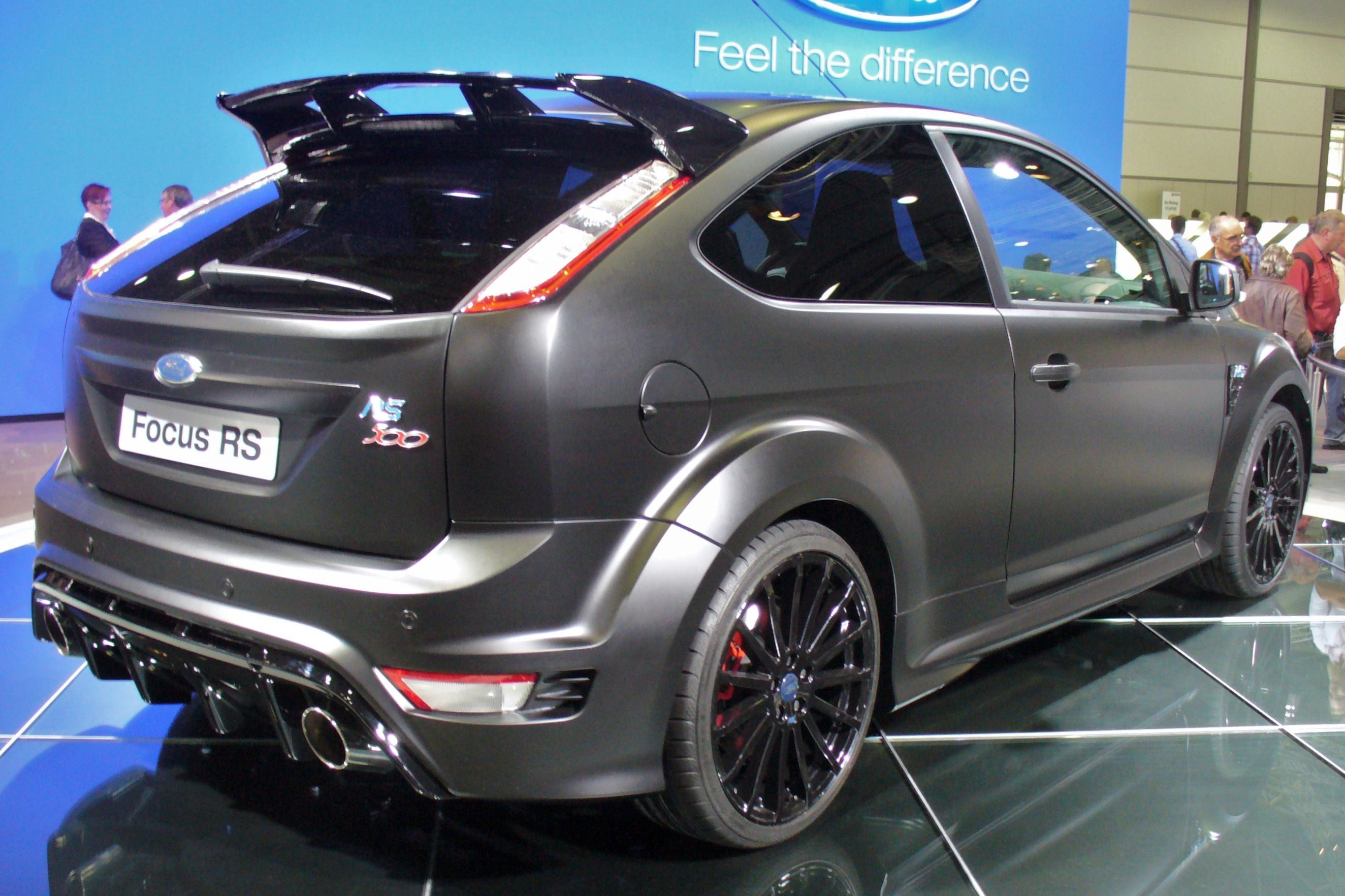
2010 Ford Focus RS 500

The Focus RS500 was launched in April 2010. A limited production run of 500 units (101 of them for Britain) were produced. It has a turbocharged 2.5 L L5 petrol engine which produces 345 bhp (257 kW; 350 PS) and can do 0-62 mph in 5.6 seconds, with a top speed of 165 mph (266 km/h) making it the fastest Focus yet.

The new model was given the RS500 designation to highlight its strictly limited production run of 500 individually numbered vehicles, all of which were offered for customers to purchase. Each RS500 carries a metal plaque on the centre console, hand-engraved with a unique identification number from 001 to 500.

To provide the RS500 with a fitting power unit, the 305 PS (224 kW; 301 bhp) turbocharged Duratec RS 2.5-litre engine from the standard Focus RS has been upgraded to deliver significantly more top-end and mid-range power. Peak power is increased by 45 PS (33 kW; 44 bhp) to 350 PS (257 kW; 345 bhp) at 6,000 rpm, while torque has been increased from 440 to 460 N⋅m (340 lb⋅ft), delivered across a broad speed range from 2,500 to 4,500 rpm.

The changes include a significantly larger air-to-air intercooler to deliver a cooler, denser charge; a larger air filter box for increased airflow; larger diameter exhaust downpipe; and an uprated fuel pump, along with an updated software calibration to optimise the performance of the revised engine.

Preliminary performance figures for the Focus RS500 indicate that it achieves 0–100 km/h in 5.6 seconds, with a top speed similar to the 263 km/h (163 mph) in the standard RS.

Engineered by Performance Car Enthusiasts The Focus RS500 engine has been modified by a team from Ford TeamRS in partnership with Revolve Technologies, the automotive engineering firm which develops Ford approved performance upgrades through its Mountune Performance brand.

All Focus RS500 vehicles will be painted in a standard Panther Black metallic colour, before being shipped to a dedicated 3M facility near Frankfurt, Germany, where a special film will be applied to the bodywork to create the matte black effect.

=== Focus BEV ===
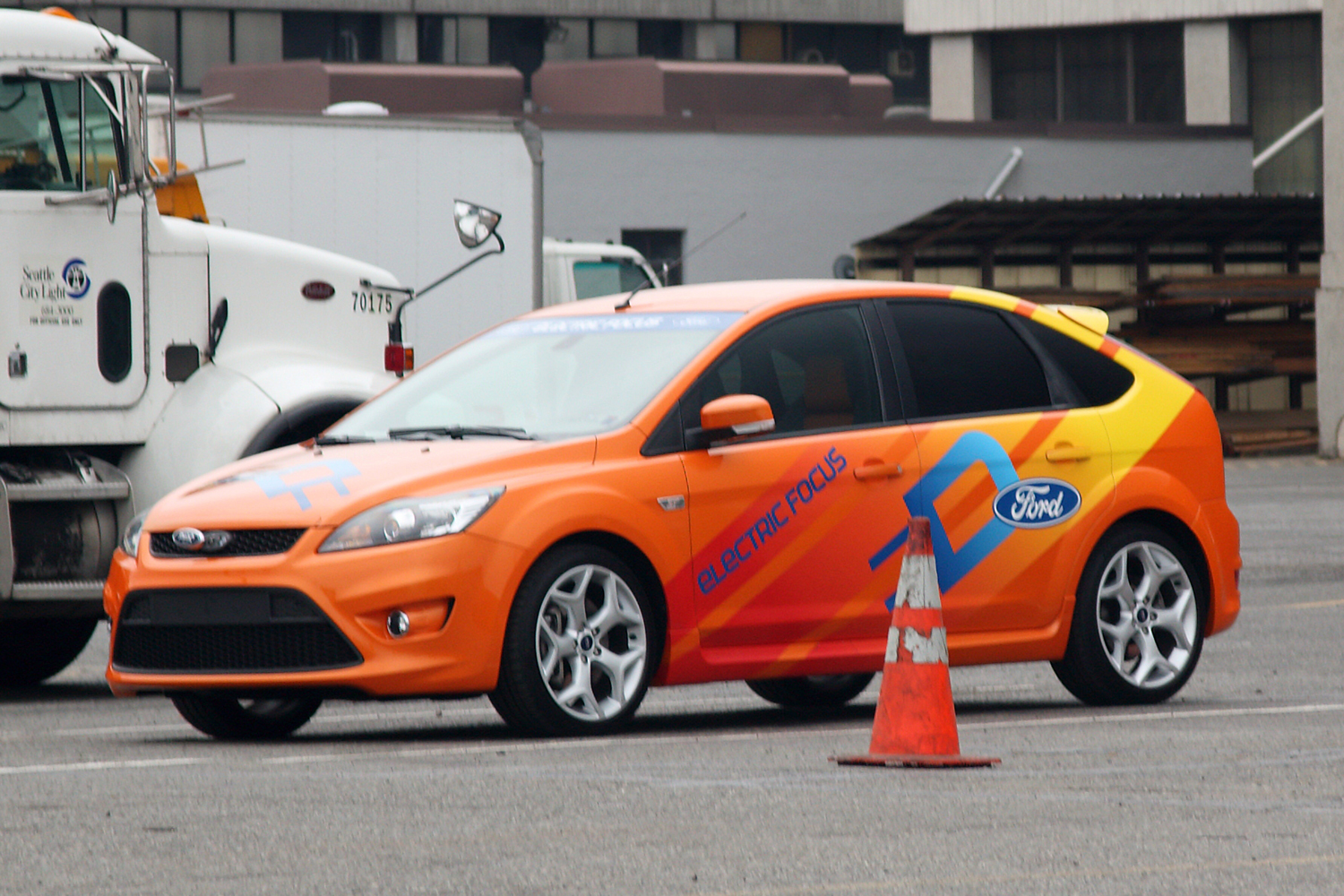
Focus BEV Demonstrator similar to the one featured on The Jay Leno Show

A prototype Focus battery electric vehicle was demonstrated in August 2008. The variant, sometimes known as the "Focus EV".

The concept car unveiled at the 2009 Frankfurt Motor Show was developed to participate in the UK Government's "Ultra-Low Carbon Vehicles" demonstration initiative in early 2010. A consortium of Ford, Scottish and Southern Energy and University of Strathclyde will use a fleet of 15 Ford Focus BEVs and a charging infrastructure in and around the London Borough of Hillingdon from early 2010. This new BEV demonstration fleet is being developed partly with public funding from the UK Government's Technology Strategy Board (TSB) which promotes innovative industry-led projects that reduce CO_{2}.

As a publicity stunt, the Focus BEV was featured on The Jay Leno Show in a segment called "Green Car Challenge" in which celebrity guests drove the electric car.

== Motorsport ==
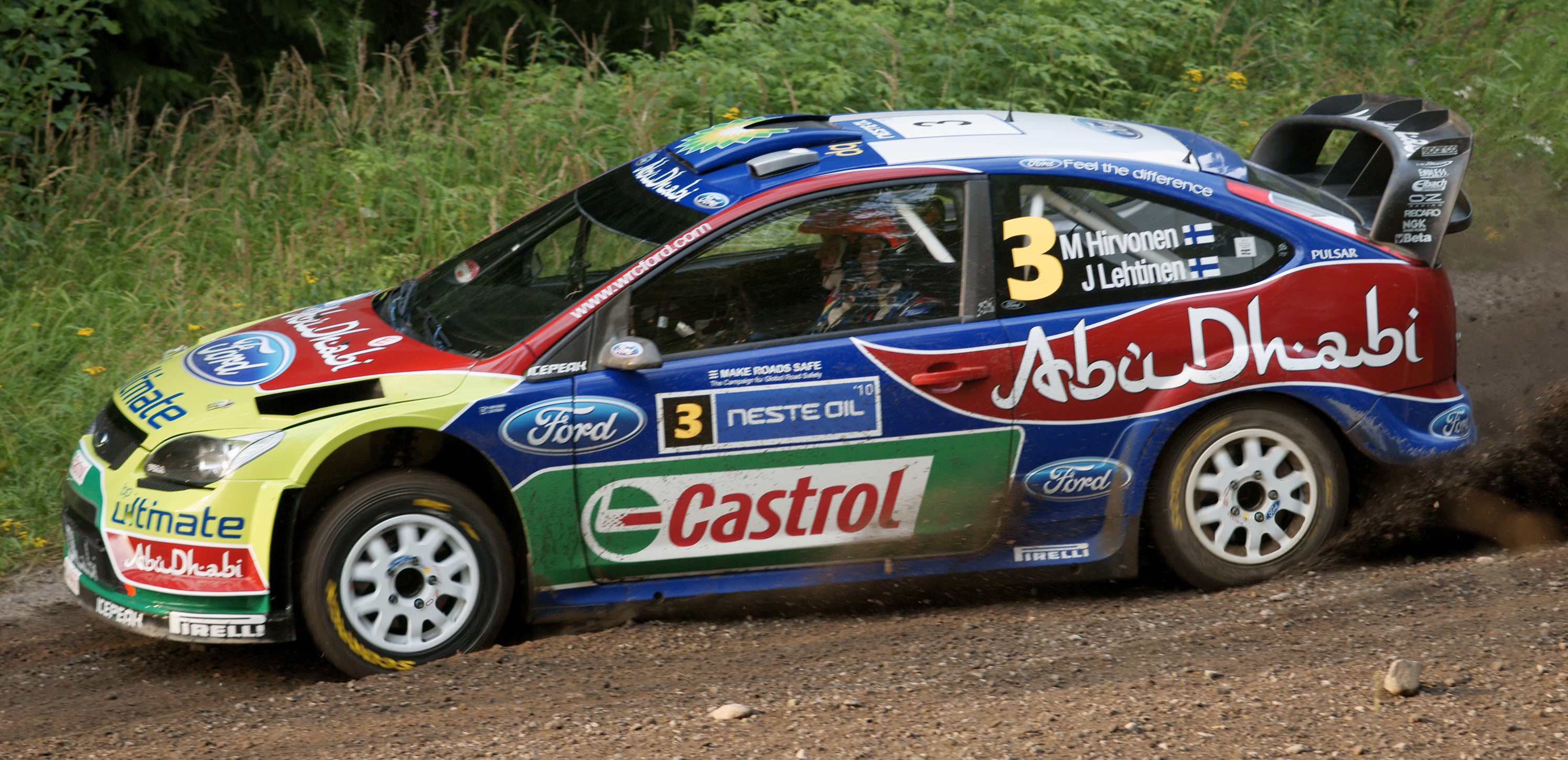
Ford Focus WRC in the Neste Oil Rally Finland 2010

The Focus RS WRC is a version built for the BP Ford World Rally Team by Ford and M-Sport, developed to compete in the World Rally Championship. The RS stands for Rallye Sport and the WRC for World Rally Car, the car's FIA specification.

Like all contemporary World Rally Cars, the car is heavily modified from the production version, with which it shares only the basic shape and some parts of the bodyshell. The car features four wheel drive, rather than the front wheel drive of the road car. The engine used in the 2007 Focus WRC is based on Ford's 2.0-litre Duratec from other models in the Focus range as rallying rules do not permit the standard 2.5-litre engine of the Focus ST or road going RS. As with most rally cars, the 2.0-litre engine is heavily modified and performance was increased using a turbocharger. Also the 2009 Ford Focus WRC uses a Ford 1998cc Pipo built I4 Duratec WRC engine (four cylinders, 16 valves, bore 85 mm and stroke 88 mm), Pi electronic engine management system, Garrett turbocharger (with required 34 mm inlet restrictor), air intercooler, and a catalytic converter.

From the last rally of the 2005 season, Ford campaigned a brand new model, the Focus RS WRC 06, following the launch of the new road-going version of the car. The engine chosen for this Focus was a Duratec motor developed by the French engine specialist Pipo Moteur. The car took twelve world rally wins, starting with the 2006 season opener Monte Carlo Rally in the hands of Marcus Grönholm.

The Focus RS WRC 07 is based on the 2006 model, and according to Ford's technical director Christian Loriaux "the changes on the new car are mainly to save weight and to improve efficiency, driveability and performance at the bottom end of the range." The car debuted very successfully at the 2007 Rally Finland as Ford's Finns Grönholm and Mikko Hirvonen finished in first and second. It later made history at the 2008 Swedish Rally when Jari-Matti Latvala used the car to become youngest-ever driver to win a world rally.

The Focus RS WRC 08 is based on the 2007 model, Ford Focus WRC 08 seen here for the first time with its new front aero design at the Rallye Deutschland 2008 Shakedown. This is the first time Hirvonen and Latvala have driven the 08 car with the new front styling.

The 2008 version of the Focus RS WRC includes design style changes as well as engine improvements. Style changes to the grille area reflect the looks of the recently previewed Focus RS Mk II road sport car.

The rally car Focus RS WRC won four times in 2008 and has 36 WRC victories to its credit since the original model debuted in 1999.

The 2009 version of the Focus RS WRC includes small design style changes in line with the Focus RS Mk II.
