= Earle S. MacPherson =

American automotive engineer (1891–1960)

- MacPherson in the 1950s
- Born: July 6, 1891; Highland Park, Illinois
- Died: January 26, 1960 (aged 68); Detroit, Michigan
- Education: University of Illinois
- Occupation: Automotive engineer
- Years active: c.1920–1958
- Employer(s): General Motors, Ford
- Known for: MacPherson strut

Earle Steele MacPherson (July 6, 1891 – January 26, 1960) was an American automotive engineer, most famous for developing the MacPherson strut in the 1940s.

== Biography ==
Earle S. MacPherson was born in Highland Park, Illinois, in 1891, and was a graduate of the University of Illinois. He served in World War I and attained the rank of captain. He worked successively for the Chalmers Motor Company and for the Liberty Motor Car Company in the early 1920s, and joined Hupmobile in 1923. In 1934, he joined General Motors, becoming chief design engineer of Chevrolet division in 1935.

MacPherson was the chief engineer of the Chevrolet Cadet project, a compact car intended to sell for less than $1,000. MacPherson developed a strut-type suspension for the Cadet, partly inspired by Fiat designs patented by Guido Fornaca in the 1920s (although the Cadet did not use a true MacPherson strut design) and a patent by Frank M. Smith of Stout Motor Car Corp.

After the Cadet was canceled in May 1947, MacPherson left GM, joining the Ford Motor Company later that year. One of his first projects was to adapt his strut suspension design for the 1955 Ford Vedette, for Ford's French subsidiary. This became the first car to use the true MacPherson strut suspension. Ford's Poissy plant got off to a slow start with the Vedette, however, and the Fords Zephyr and Consul which captured the headlines at the 1950 London Motor Show have also been claimed as the first cars to appear "in mass production" with MacPherson struts.

MacPherson became chief engineer of Ford Motor Company in 1952, a position he retained until his retirement in May 1958. He died in January 1960, at Old Grace Hospital in Detroit, after he suffered a heart attack.
