= RevoKnuckle =

RevoKnuckle is a variation of the MacPherson strut suspension design by Ford which separates steering and suspension movements to provide lower scrub radius and kingpin offset than traditional MacPherson struts.

== Details ==
Ford claims that it weighs less and costs less than double wishbone and multi-link suspension arrangement. The kingpin offset compares favorably to that of double wishbone suspensions (20-30mm vs 40mm). The main advantage of RevoKnuckle compared to MacPherson struts is the reduction in torque steer, especially for high powered front-wheel drive (FWD) applications.

The RevoKnuckle is intended for use on FWD platforms such as the Focus, Mondeo, and was used in the RS Mk2 version of the Ford Focus.
