= MacPherson strut =

Type of automotive suspension design

Animation showing the location and construction of a MacPherson strut–type suspension system

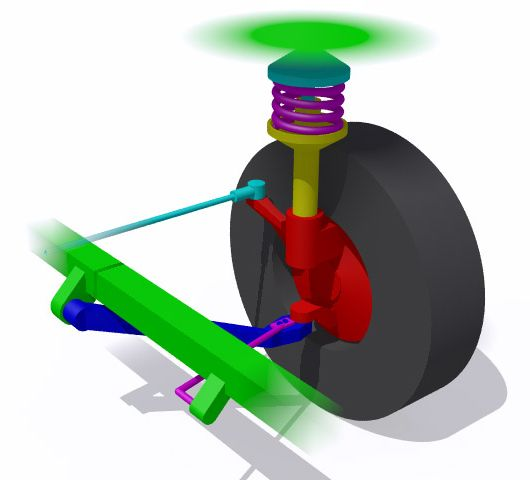
A simple MacPherson strut suspension on the left front wheel of a rear-wheel drive vehicle. The front of the vehicle is at bottom right of the image. Upper green: Vehicle body/strut interface Red: Steering knuckle or hub carrier Blue: Lower control arm or track control arm Light blue: Steering gear tie rod or track rod Lower purple: Radius rod Upper purple: Coil spring Yellow: Tubular housing containing shock absorber or damper Lower green: Vehicle frame or unibody member

The MacPherson strut is a type of automotive suspension system that uses the top of a telescopic damper as the upper steering pivot. It is widely used in the front suspension of modern vehicles. The name comes from American automotive engineer Earle S. MacPherson, who invented and developed the design.

== History ==
Earle S. MacPherson was appointed the chief engineer of Chevrolet's Light Car project in 1945. He was tasked with developing a new, smaller car for the immediate post-war market, an effort that led to the Chevrolet Cadet.

The Cadet was poised to be a groundbreaking vehicle, and the three prototypes that had been built by 1946 displayed a wide range of innovations. One of these was a revolutionary new independent suspension system that featured what is now known as a MacPherson strut. The Cadet was slated to be the first production vehicle with MacPherson struts, but the project was cancelled in 1947 and never saw commercial production. This was in large part due to GM's concerns about the Cadet's forecasted profit margins.

After the Cadet project was shelved, a disgruntled MacPherson left GM to join Ford. Patents were filed in 1947 (U.S. patent 2,624,592 for GM) and in 1949 (U.S. patent 2,660,449 for Ford), with the latter patent citing designs by Guido Fornaca of FIAT in the mid-1920s.

MacPherson's new strut design may have taken inspirations from other earlier designs as well. The strut suspension of the pre-war Stout Scarab could have been an influence, and long-travel struts in aircraft landing gear were well known by that time. The French Cottin-Desgouttes utilized a similar design, albeit with less sophisticated leaf springs, but the Cottin-Desgouttes front suspension was in turn inspired by a 1904 design by American engineer J. Walter Christie.

MacPherson designed the strut for all four wheels, but it is normally used for the front suspension only, where it provides a steering pivot as well as a suspension mounting for the wheel.

The first production car to use MacPherson struts is often cited incorrectly as the French 1949 Ford Vedette, but it was developed before MacPherson, with an independent front suspension based on wishbones and an upper coil spring. Only in 1954, after the Vedette factory had been purchased by Simca, did the revised Simca Vedette switch to using front struts.

Following MacPherson's arrival at Ford, the first production car to feature MacPherson struts was the British-built 1950 Ford Consul and the later Zephyr.

== Design ==
Construction of a MacPherson strut suspension system

A MacPherson strut suspension system consists of the following components as shown in the table below.

Components of a MacPherson strut suspension system
Component	Description	Type(s) of motion performed
MacPherson strut	It serves two different purposes, namely 1) to connect the steering knuckle to the vehicle frame, as done by upper wishbone in a double wishbone suspension system. 2) to absorb road shocks, working as a shock absorber unit. This unit includes both coil springs for road shock absorption and shock absorbers (dampers) to critically damp the vehicle's suspension system.	Two different motions performed, namely 1) compression (during jounce) and expansion (during rebound); 2) rotates about the steering axis with the wheel when the vehicle is steered.
Lower wishbone	It connects the steering knuckle to the vehicle's subframe, indirectly connecting to the vehicle frame. Works in a similar fashion as that of a lower wishbone in a double wishbone suspension system.	Pivots about the lower wishbone mountings (pivot points) made in the vehicle's subframe.
Steering knuckle	It serves two different purposes, namely 1) to connect the MacPherson strut, lower wishbone and steering outer tie rod to the wheel hub (wheel assembly). 2) to convert the linear input from the steering tie rod (steering rack) into an angular output of the wheel.	Two different motions performed: 1) up and down translation, vertically with respect to the vehicle's orientation during jounce and rebound. 2) rotation about the steering axis along with the MacPherson strut when the vehicle is steered.
Wheel hub	It is a two piece (assembled) component which consists of two following parts: a) Knuckle end: It is rigidly mounted on the steering knuckle and houses the stud side (wheel side) of the wheel hub. b) Wheel end: It is the rotary component of the wheel hub, pressed fitted inside the knuckle end using ball bearings which allows the wheel end to rotate freely independent of the knuckle end. It serves two different functions as mentioned below: 1) to connect the wheel assembly to the steering knuckle, allowing the complete wheel assembly to turn with the steering knuckle and MacPherson strut. 2) to provide the drive from the CV (constant velocity) axle / CVU axle / CVU shaft / half shaft to the wheel using the internal splines grooved inside the wheel end of the wheel hub.	Rotation along with the CV axle / half shaft about the axis of rotation of the driven wheel.

A MacPherson strut uses a wishbone, or a substantial compression link stabilized by a secondary link, which provides a mounting point for the hub carrier or axle of the wheel. The lower arm system provides both lateral and longitudinal location of the wheel. The upper part of the hub carrier is rigidly fixed to the bottom of the outer part of the strut proper. That slides up and down the inner part of it, which extends upwards directly to a mounting in the body shell of the vehicle. The line from the top mount of the strut to the bottom ball joint on the control arm gives the steering axis inclination. The axis of the strut may be angled inwards from the steering axis at the bottom, to clear the tyre, which makes the bottom follow an arc when steering.

The MacPherson strut benefited from introduction of unibody construction, because its design requires substantial vertical space and a strong top mount, which unibody construction can provide. Unibody construction also distributes suspension stresses. The strut will usually carry both the coil spring, on which the body is suspended, and the shock absorber, which is usually in the form of a cartridge mounted within the strut (see coilover). The strut can also have the steering arm built into the lower outer portion. The whole assembly is very simple and can be pre-assembled into a unit. As well, the elimination of the upper control arm allows for more width in the engine compartment, which is useful for smaller cars, particularly with transverse-mounted engines, such as most front wheel drive vehicles have. The assembly can be further simplified, if needed, by substituting an anti-roll bar (torsion bar) for the radius arm. For those reasons, it has become almost ubiquitous with low cost manufacturers. Furthermore, it offers an easy method to set suspension geometry.

Many modern versions replace the lower control arm with a wishbone. An anti-roll bar is optional and, if present, is attached by a ball-jointed rod to the spring-damper, or by a ball or elastomerically jointed rod to the wishbone.

== Advantages and disadvantages ==
Because MacPherson struts are packaged with a significant structure in the front crash structure of the car, it is easier to engineer cars that pass more stringent small overlap crashes with struts, as opposed to those with a double wishbone suspension. Notable examples include the Honda Accord and Civic, as well as the Mercedes E-Class, all of which adopted struts to improve crash performance. The overall simplicity of the design also means there are fewer joints in the suspension to wear, so there is less decline in handling and steering feel over time. Inverted monotube struts can also provide extra rigidity in the front suspension, as seen in the Porsche 911 GT3 and Cayman GT4, as well as the Subaru Impreza WRX STI. Finally, struts can package more efficiently than other types of front suspension, which allows for significant front cargo space in rear/mid-engined cars, such as the Porsche 911 and Boxster.

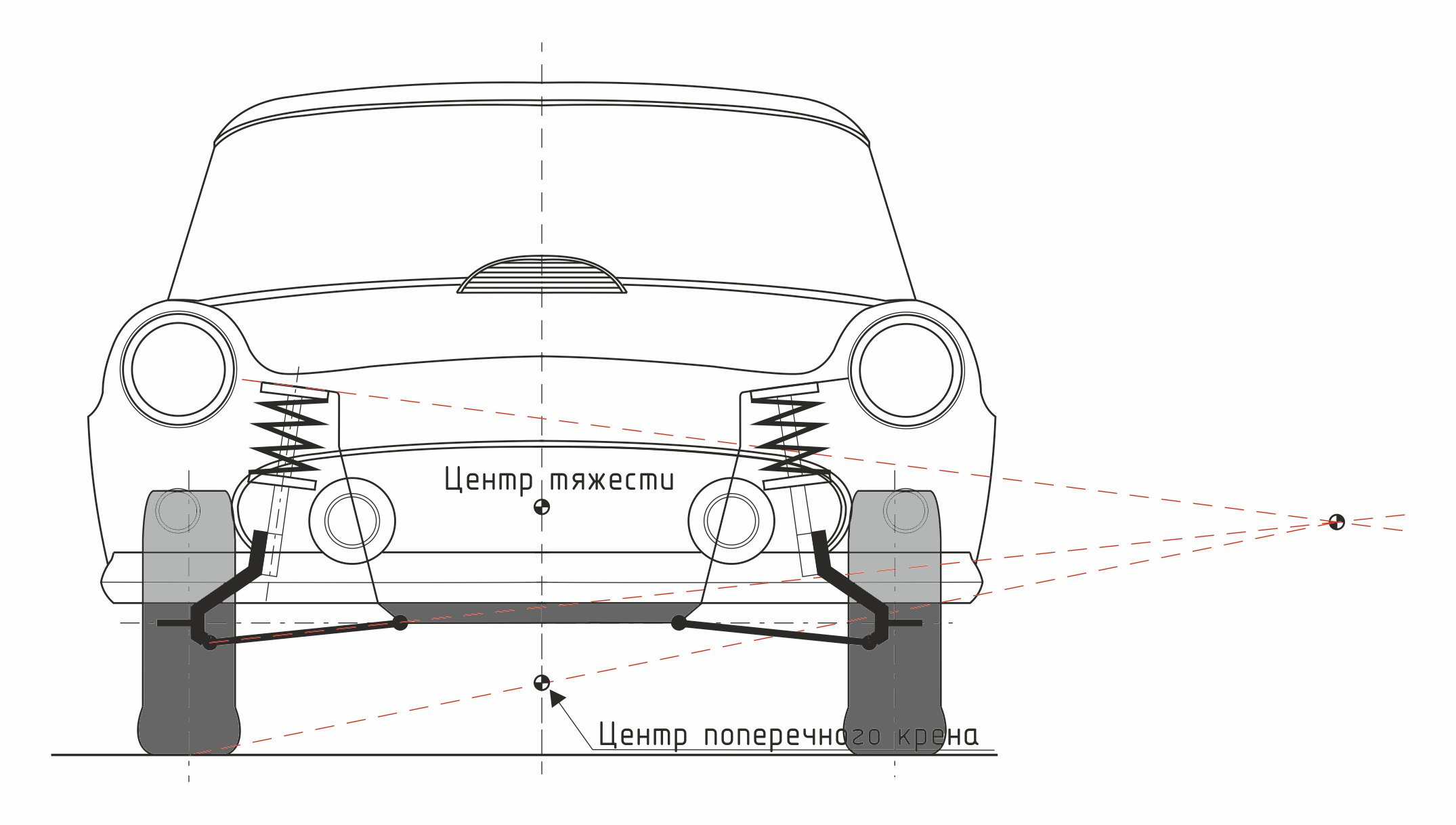
Finding the roll center of a MacPherson strut

Geometric analysis shows the assembly cannot allow vertical movement of the wheel without some degree of either camber angle change, sideways movement, or both. It is not generally considered to give as good handling as a double wishbone or multi-link suspension, because it allows the engineers less freedom to choose camber change and roll center. Cars that have cockpit adjustable ride height generally cannot have MacPherson struts because of the camber changes that are an unavoidable part of the design. Ride suffers because the shock absorber has almost the same vertical motion as the wheel, so there is relatively little leverage to break the stiction in the seals. A standard single pivot MacPherson strut also tends to have positive scrub where the center of the steering axis is offset from the center of the front tires, which results in torque steer.

Despite the drawbacks, the MacPherson strut set-up is still used on some high performance cars, because they tend to have relatively small suspension travel, and so do not have the same kinematic problems.

Up until the 1989 model year (964), Porsche 911 used a similar strut design that did not have coil springs, using torsion bar suspension instead. Since then, all Porsche 911s have had front MacPherson struts, except the 992-based 911 GT3, which uses a double wishbone.

In recent years, General Motors and Ford have introduced a modified strut set-up, Hi-Per Strut and "Revoknuckle" respectively, that split the strut into two components that handle the up-and-down flexibility and steering dynamics separately. The benefits of this design are greater surface contact and reduction in torque steer. The drawbacks are the additional weight and cost, but it is less expensive than either a double wishbone or multi-link setup. Honda introduced another variation strut set-up, called "dual-axis", which is used in the suspension design of the Civic Type-R. Another variant of the MacPherson strut is the double pivot front suspension, which splits the lower wishbone into two while retaining the standard upright design of the MacPherson strut. That allows for better control of steering geometry and scrub radius, while allowing for a larger brake assembly.

== See also ==
- Chapman strut
- Coilover
- Double wishbone suspension
- Strut bar
