= Audi straight-five engine =

Audi Inline-5
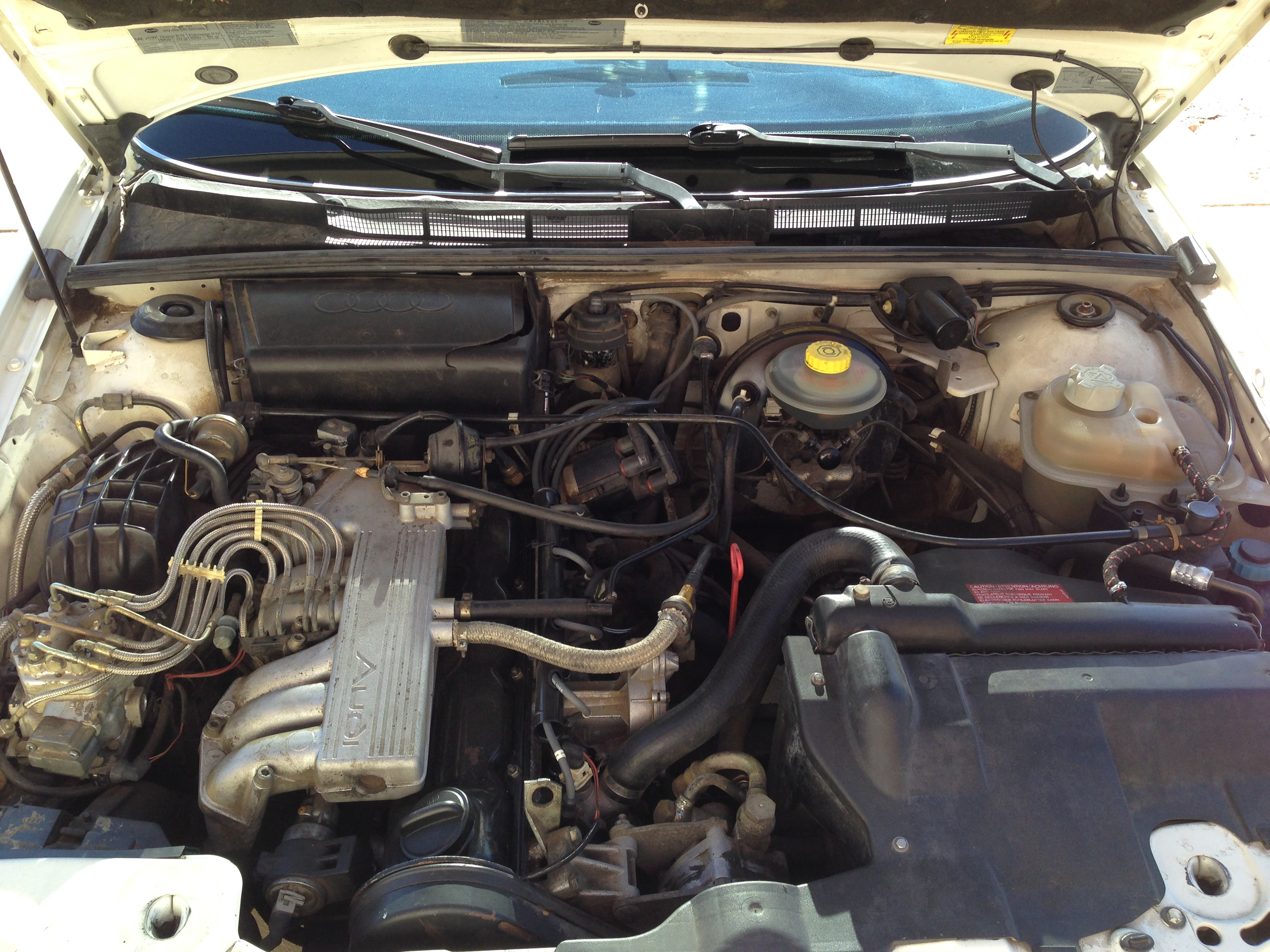
- Audi 2.3 L SOHC 10V I5 engine

Overview
- Manufacturer: Audi AG
- Production: 1976–present

Layout
- Displacement: 1,921 cc (1.9 L; 117.2 cu in); 1,986 cc (2.0 L; 121.2 cu in); 1,994 cc (2.0 L; 121.7 cu in); 2,144 cc (2.1 L; 130.8 cu in); 2,226 cc (2.2 L; 135.8 cu in); 2,309 cc (2.3 L; 140.9 cu in); 2,370 cc (2.4 L; 144.6 cu in); 2,461 cc (2.5 L; 150.2 cu in); 2,480 cc (2.5 L; 151.3 cu in)
- Cylinder bore: 76.5 mm (3.0 in); 79.5 mm (3.1 in); 81.0 mm (3.2 in); 82.5 mm (3.2 in)
- Piston stroke: 77.4 mm (3.0 in); 86.4 mm (3.4 in); 92.8 mm (3.7 in); 95.5 mm (3.8 in)
- Cylinder block material: Cast iron Aluminum
- Cylinder head material: Aluminum
- Valvetrain: SOHC; DOHC

Combustion
- Fuel system: Carburetor; Multi-port fuel injection Direct injection
- Fuel type: Gasoline; Diesel
- Cooling system: Water-cooled

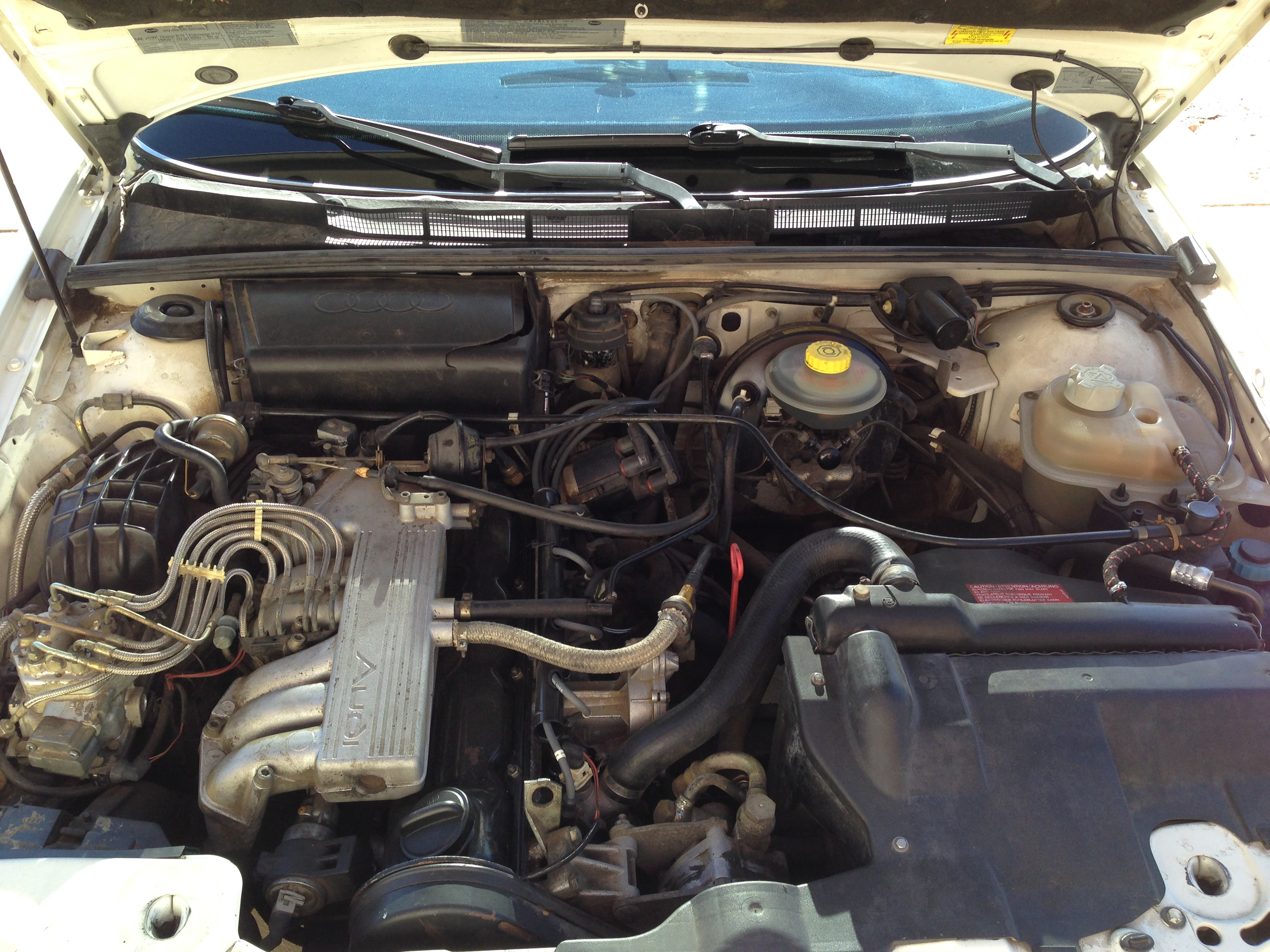
An Audi R5 2.3 L SOHC 10V I5 engine in a 1988 Audi 80 quattro

The Audi straight-five engine is a series of four-stroke SOHC and DOHC five-cylinder engines, designed, developed and produced by German manufacturer Audi since 1976. The engines have also been used in various Volkswagen models, as part of the VAG partnership, as well as Volvo using a few of these engines in their diesel model cars.

== History ==
=== Diesel engines ===
In 1978, the Audi 2.0 R5 D engine was introduced in the Audi 100 sedan. In 1983, a turbocharged version was introduced, initially for the U.S. market Audi 100. Several Volvo cars, from March 1996 to 2001, were produced with Audi straight-five diesel engines, prior to the introduction of the Volvo D5 turbo-diesel engine; this engine was produced from 2001 to 2017 and was used in several diesel hybrid applications (marketed as "twin engine" models).

The Volkswagen Group's first TDI engine was introduced in the 1989 Audi 100 TDI sedan. The Audi 100 was powered by the Volkswagen 2.5 R5 TDI straight-five engine which used an electronic distributor injection pump (called "VerteilerPumpe" by Volkswagen) and two-stage direct injection. The initial version of this engine generated 88 kW (118 hp) at 3,250 rpm and 275 N⋅m (203 lb⋅ft) at 2,500 rpm.

=== Gasoline engines ===
The first production straight-five petrol engine was the Audi 2.1 R5 introduced in the Audi 100 in 1977. Audi has continued use of straight-five petrol engines (in both naturally aspirated and turbocharged versions) to the present day. The Audi TT RS and Audi RS3 currently use straight-five engines. In motorsport, the first car to use a straight-five engine was the Audi Quattro rally car; other racing cars which used straight-five engines include the 1985-1986 Audi Sport Quattro E2 and the 1989 Audi 90 Quattro IMSA GTO. For the year 1987 factory team tested a 1000 hp version of the inline-5 powered Audi S1 Sport Quattro.

Several Volkswagen-branded straight-five engines have been produced, beginning with the Volkswagen WH/WN 1.9 litre 10v engine used in the 1981 Volkswagen Passat. The final Volkswagen straight-five petrol engine was the Volkswagen EA855 2.5 litre 20v engine used in the North American Passat models until 2014.
