= Volvo V50 =

Swedish compact station wagon

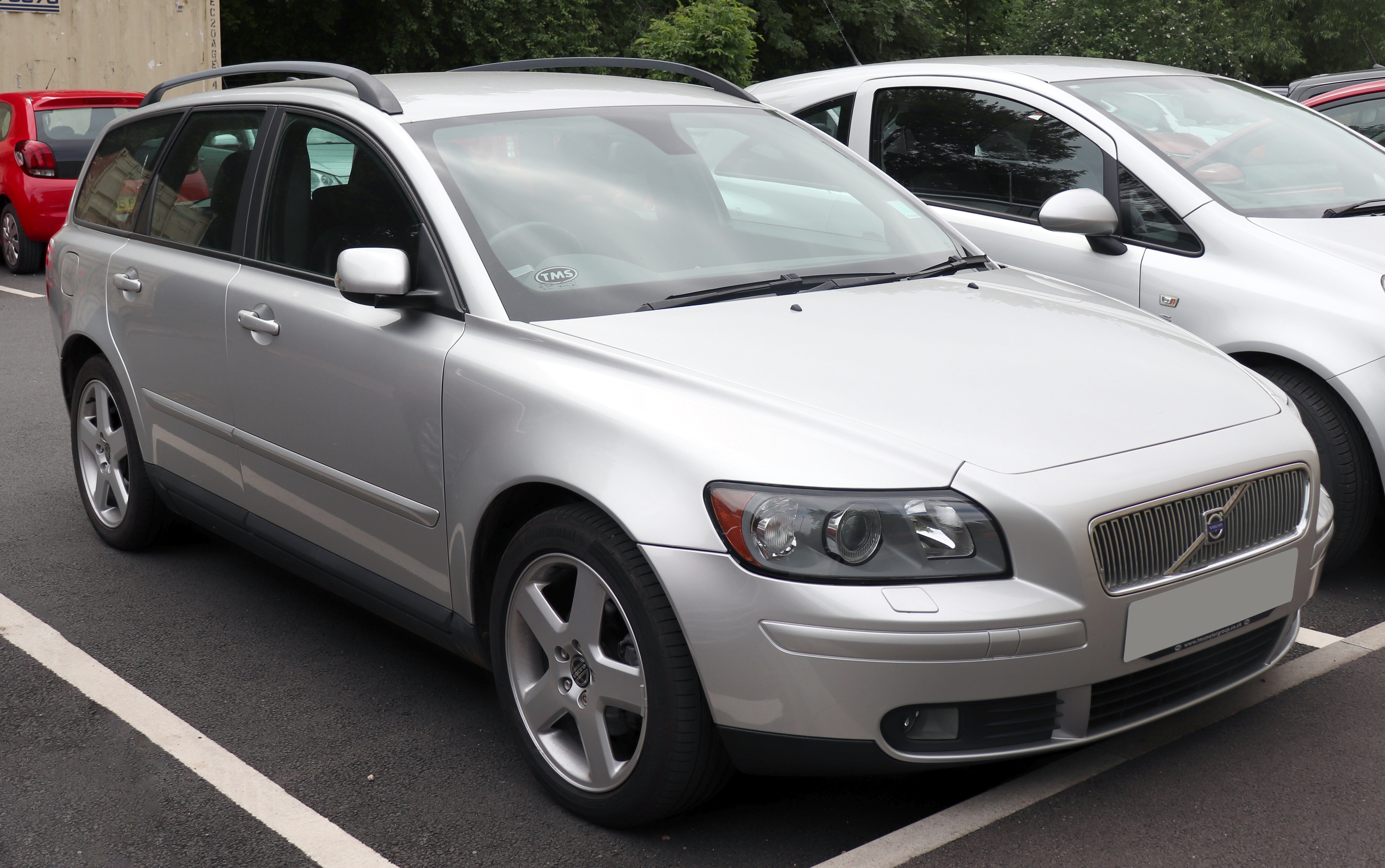

Overview
- Manufacturer: Volvo Cars
- Production: 2004–2012
- Model years: 2005–2011
- Assembly: Belgium: Ghent (VCG); Malaysia: Shah Alam (SMA); South Africa: Pretoria (CMH Volvo Cars Pretoria)
- Designer: Fedde Talsma

Body and chassis
- Class: Compact / Small family car / Subcompact executive car(C)
- Body style: 5-door station wagon
- Layout: Front engine, front-wheel drive or all-wheel drive
- Platform: Volvo P1 platform
- Related: Volvo S40

Powertrain
- Engine: Petrol: 1.6 L I4; 1.8 L I4; 2.0 L I4; 2.4 L I5; 2.5 L turbo I5; Diesel: 1.6 L PSA HDi I4; 2.0 L I4; 2.4 L D5 turbo I5; Flexifuel: 1.8 L I4
- Transmission: 5-speed MTX-75 manual; 5-speed Volvo M56; 6-speed Volvo M66 manual; 5-speed Aisin AW55-50 automatic; 6-speed Aisin TF-80SC automatic; 6-speed Ford 6DCT450 automatic

Dimensions
- Wheelbase: 2,640 mm (103.9 in)
- Length: 2005–2007: 4,514 mm (177.7 in); 2008–2012: 4,522 mm (178.0 in)
- Width: 2005–2012: 1,770 mm (69.7 in); with door mirrors: 2,022 mm (79.6 in)
- Height: 2005–2007: 1,452 mm (57.2 in); 2008–2012: 1,457 mm (57.4 in); 2008–2012 AWD: 1,460 mm (57.5 in)
- Curb weight: FWD: 1,445–1,520 kg (3,186–3,351 lb); AWD: 1,560–1,590 kg (3,440–3,510 lb)

Chronology
- Predecessor: Volvo V40 (1995–2004)
- Successor: Volvo V40; Volvo V60

The Volvo V50 is the station wagon version of the Volvo S40 small family car ("C-segment") first unveiled at the 2003 Bologna Motor Show, both assembled at Ghent, Belgium. Sharing the Volvo, Ford, and Mazda Global C-car Platform with the European 2nd-gen Ford Focus and the Mazda3, the V50 featured interior "theatre" lighting, a floating center console, and "Volvo Intelligent Vehicle Architecture".

== Overview ==
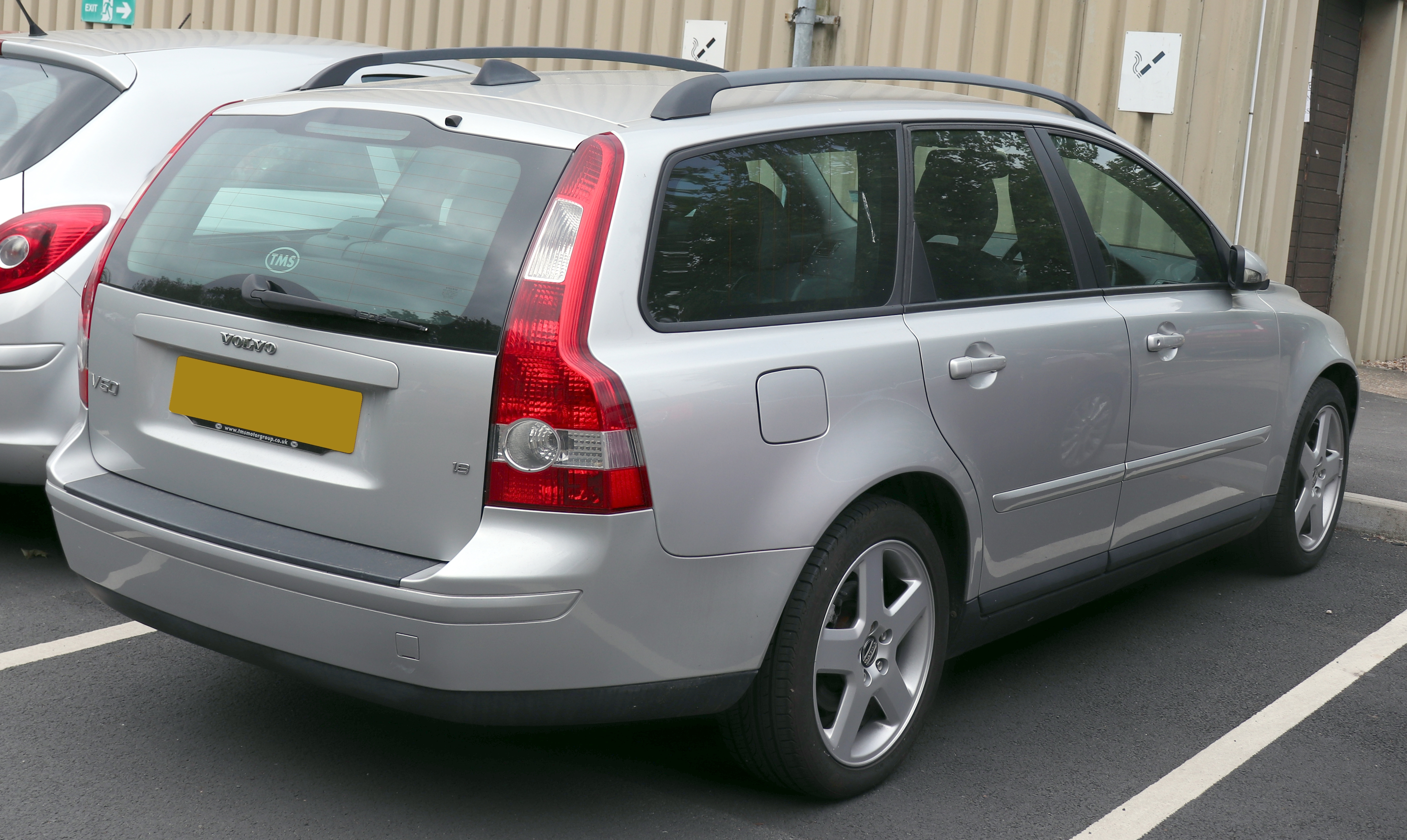
Pre-facelift Volvo V50 SE (UK)

The V50 T5 AWD featured all-wheel drive and a straight-5 2.5 litre petrol engine, with a light pressure turbocharger, four valves per cylinder and a DOHC design with variable camshaft timing — providing 220 PS (162 kW; 217 hp) and 320 N⋅m (236 lb⋅ft) of torque. Diesel options were available in Europe, including a 2.4 Litre turbocharged D5 diesel engine which provided 180 PS (132 kW; 178 hp) and 350 N⋅m (258 lb⋅ft) of torque.

Within the United States, Volvo limited sales of the V50 PZEV cars to states where it was required, including California, Florida, Vermont, Connecticut, Arizona, Maryland, Massachusetts, Pennsylvania, New York, Oregon, Maine, New Jersey, Rhode Island, New Mexico and Washington.

Volvo Cars Special Vehicle produced a concept car based on the V50, the V50 SV, whose engine produces 340 hp (254 kW), and debuted at the 2004 Specialty Equipment Market Association trade show in Las Vegas, Nevada.

== History ==
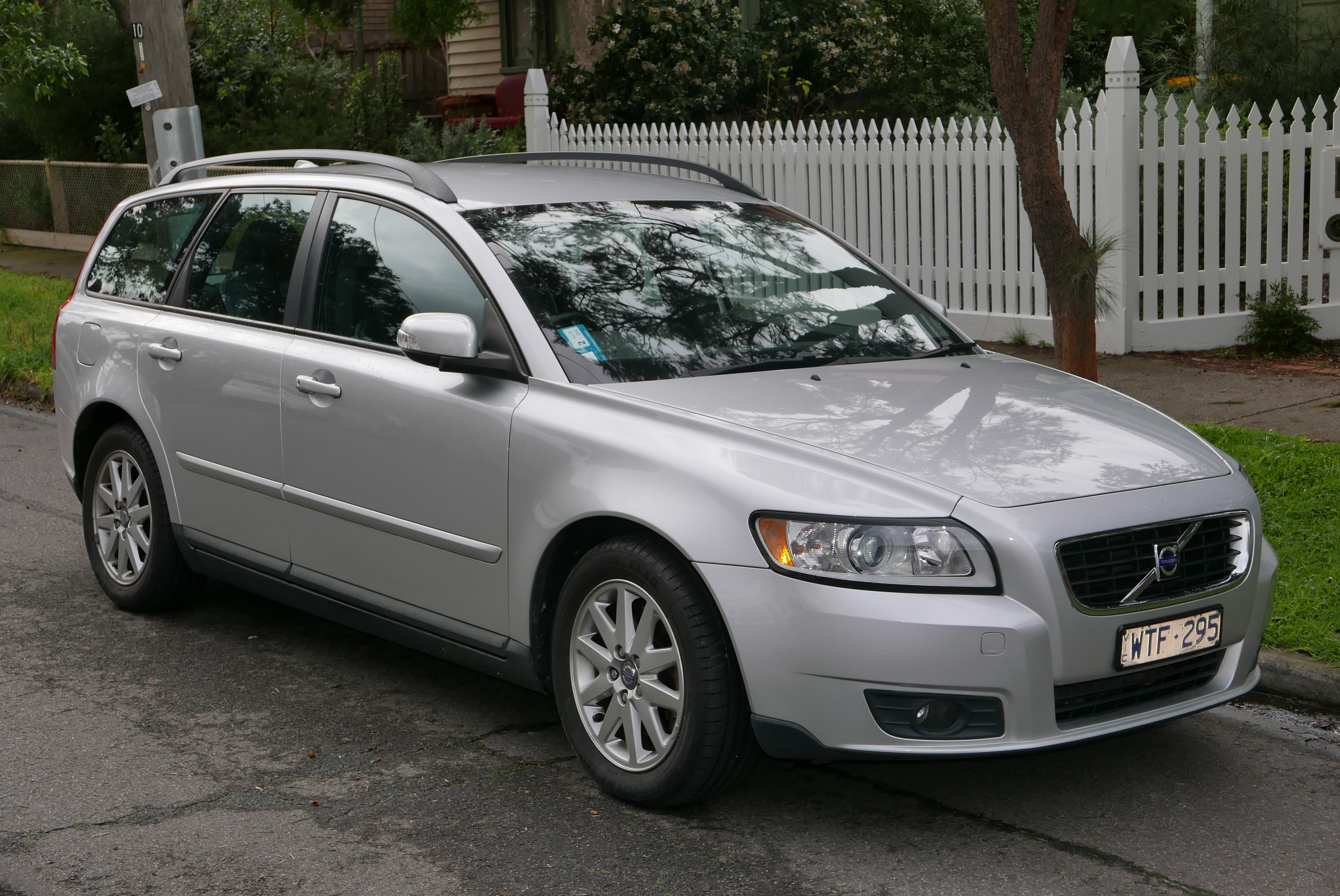
Facelift Volvo V50

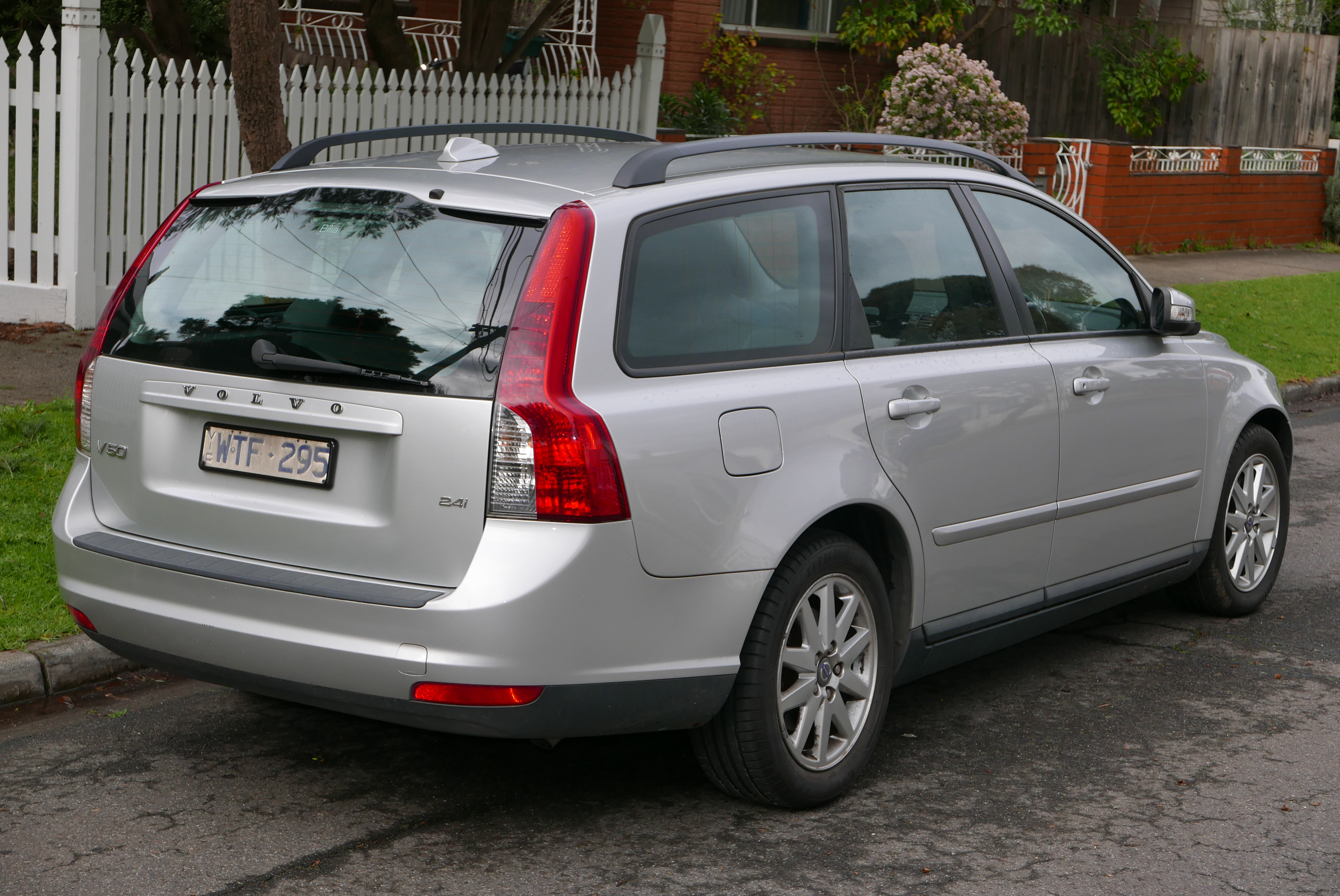
Facelift Volvo V50

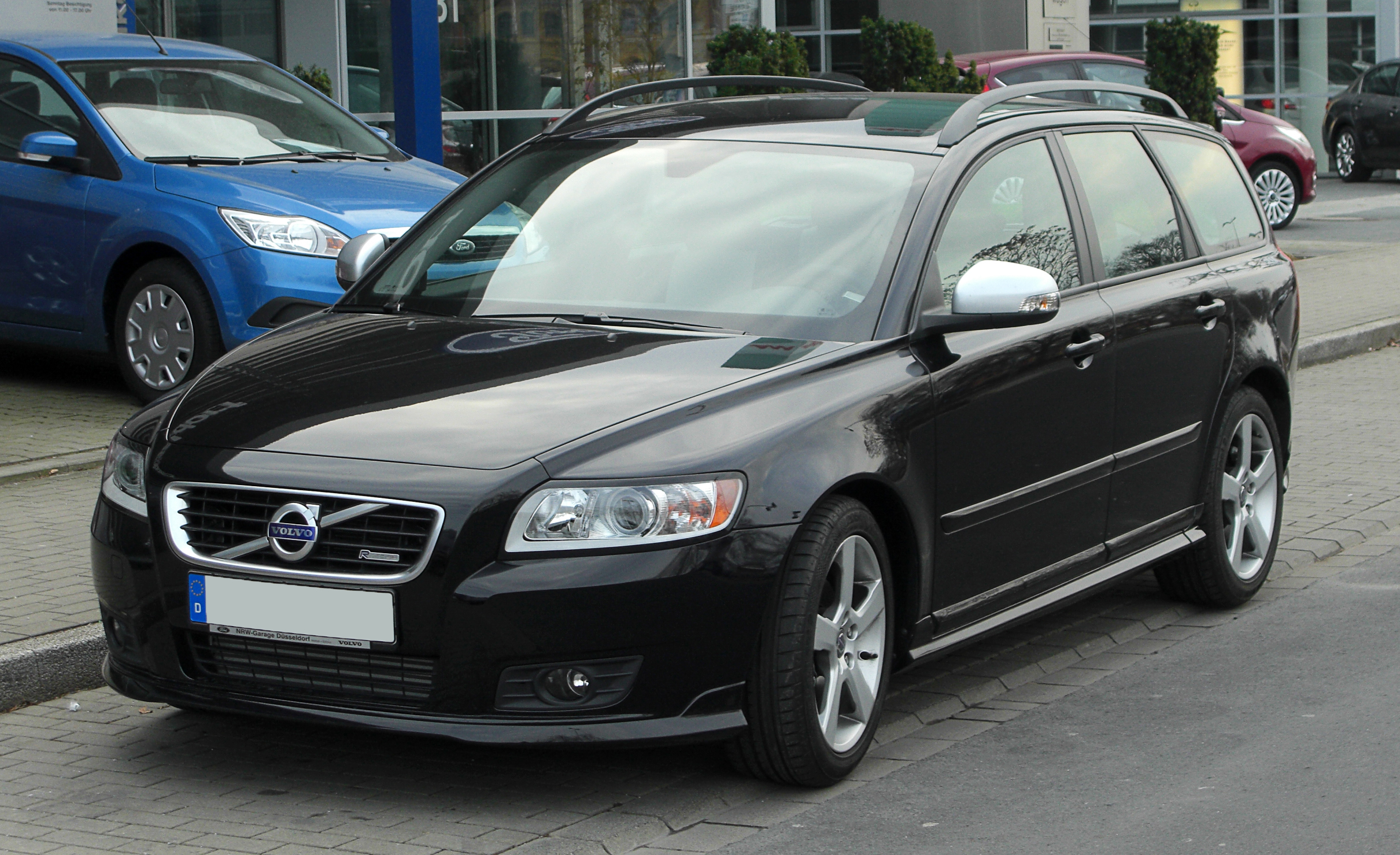
Facelift Volvo V50 R-Design (Europe)

For the model year of 2008, the V50 received revised front styling, minor modifications to the interior, optional active xenon headlights, audio systems, increased power and torque of the T5 engine, availability of the D5, with a six speed manual and a 1.8 Flexifuel engine.

For 2009, the V50 T5 was available in the United States, only as an automatic AWD model with the R-Design trim package, and within Europe with both manual and automatic options. As of the model year of 2010, the D5 inline five diesel engine was no longer available; only the 1.6l and 2.0l diesel inline four units could be specified.

In 2010, the new, larger, circular Volvo logo appeared on the front grille, in the United States, a manual transmission was briefly available with the T5 AWD version. In North America the naturally aspirated five cylinder engine, all wheel drive, and manual transmission were all dropped for the model year of 2011, leaving only the automatic, front wheel drive T5 in base and R-Design trims. The model year of 2011 was the last for the V50 in the United States and Canada.

=== V50 sales ===
Calendar year	Global
2004	47,743
2005	83,202
2006	75,885
2007	62,348
2008	62,085
2009	54,062
2010	56,098
2011	45,970

Total produced: 519,007 from 2003 to 2012 (as of 31 December 2012)

== Engines ==
Petrol engines
Model	Engine code	Model year(s)	Power at rpm	Torque at rpm	Displacement	Comment
1.6	B4164S3	2005–2012	100 PS (74 kW; 99 hp) at 6000	150 N⋅m (111 lb⋅ft) at 4000	1,596 cc (97.4 in^{3})	I4 16V Multipoint fuel injection
1.8	B4184S11	2005–2010	125 PS (92 kW; 123 hp) at 6000	165 N⋅m (122 lb⋅ft) 4000	1,798 cc (109.7 in^{3})	I4 16V Multipoint fuel injection
1.8F Flexifuel	B4184S8	2006–2010	125 PS (92 kW; 123 hp) at 6000	165 N⋅m (122 lb⋅ft) 4000	1,798 cc (109.7 in^{3})	I4 16V Multipoint fuel injection (E85 compatible)
2.0	B4204S3	2004–2012	145 PS (107 kW; 143 hp) at 6000	185 N⋅m (136 lb⋅ft) 4500	1,999 cc (122.0 in^{3})	I4 16V Multipoint fuel injection
2.0F Flexifuel	B4204S4	2011–2012	145 PS (107 kW; 143 hp) at 6000	185 N⋅m (136 lb⋅ft) 4500	1,999 cc (122.0 in^{3})	I4 16V Multipoint fuel injection (E85 compatible)
2.4	B5244S5	2004–2010	140 PS (103 kW; 138 hp) 5000	220 N⋅m (162 lb⋅ft) 4000	2,435 cc (148.6 in^{3})	I5 20V Multipoint fuel injection
2.4i	B5244S4	2004–2010	170 PS (125 kW; 168 hp) 6000	230 N⋅m (170 lb⋅ft) 4400	2,435 cc (148.6 in^{3})	I5 20V Multipoint fuel injection
T5	B5254T3	2005–2008	220 PS (162 kW; 217 hp) 5000	320 N⋅m (236 lb⋅ft) 1500-4800	2,521 cc (153.8 in^{3})	I5 20V Turbo Multipoint fuel injection
T5	B5254T7	2008–2012	230 PS (169 kW; 227 hp) 5000	320 N⋅m (236 lb⋅ft) 1500-5000	2,521 cc (153.8 in^{3})	I5 20V Turbo Multipoint fuel injection

Diesel engines
Model	Engine code	Model year(s)	Power at rpm	Torque at rpm	Displacement	Comment
1.6D	D4164T	2005–2010	109 PS (80 kW; 108 hp) at 4000	240 N⋅m (177 lb⋅ft) at 1750	1,560 cc (95.2 in^{3})	I4 16v Turbo Multipoint direct fuel injection
1.6D DRIVe	D4164T	2005–2010	109 PS (80 kW; 108 hp) at 4000	240 N⋅m (177 lb⋅ft) 1750	1,560 cc (95.2 in^{3})	I4 16v Turbo Multipoint direct fuel injection
D2	D4162T	2011–2012	115 PS (85 kW; 113 hp) at 3600	270 N⋅m (199 lb⋅ft) 1750	1,560 cc (95.2 in^{3})	I4 8v Turbo Common rail direct injection
D2 DRIVe	D4162T	2011–2012	115 PS (85 kW; 113 hp) at 3600	270 N⋅m (199 lb⋅ft) 1750	1,560 cc (95.2 in^{3})	I4 8v Turbo Common rail direct injection
2.0D	D4204T	2004–2010	136 PS (100 kW; 134 hp) 4000	320 N⋅m (236 lb⋅ft) 2000	1,997 cc (121.9 in^{3})	I4 16v Turbo Multipoint direct fuel injection
2.0D (France)	D4204T2	2005–2006	133 PS (98 kW; 131 hp) 4000	320 N⋅m (236 lb⋅ft) 2000	1,997 cc (121.9 in^{3})	I4 16v Turbo Multipoint direct fuel injection
D3	D5204T5	2011–2012	150 PS (110 kW; 148 hp) 3500	350 N⋅m (258 lb⋅ft) 1500-2750	1,984 cc (121.1 in^{3})	I5 20v Turbo Common rail direct injection
D4	D5204T	2011–2012	177 PS (130 kW; 175 hp) 3500	400 N⋅m (295 lb⋅ft) 1500-2750	1,984 cc (121.1 in^{3})	I5 20v Turbo Common rail direct injection
D5	D5244T8	2006–2010	180 PS (132 kW; 178 hp) 4000	350 N⋅m (258 lb⋅ft) 1750-3250	2,400 cc (146.5 in^{3})	I5
2.4D (Belgium)	D5244T9	2007–2008	163 PS (120 kW; 161 hp) 5500	340 N⋅m (251 lb⋅ft) 1750-2750	2,400 cc (146.5 in^{3})	I5
D5 (Belgium)	D5244T9	2009–2010	163 PS (120 kW; 161 hp) 4000	340 N⋅m (251 lb⋅ft) 1750 – 3000	2,400 cc (146.5 in^{3})	I5
D5	D5244T13	2009–2010	180 PS (132 kW; 178 hp) 4000	400 N⋅m (295 lb⋅ft) 2000 – 2750	2,400 cc (146.5 in^{3})	I5

== See also ==
- Volvo S40
- Volvo P1 platform
