= Volvo S40 =

Swedish series of compact cars

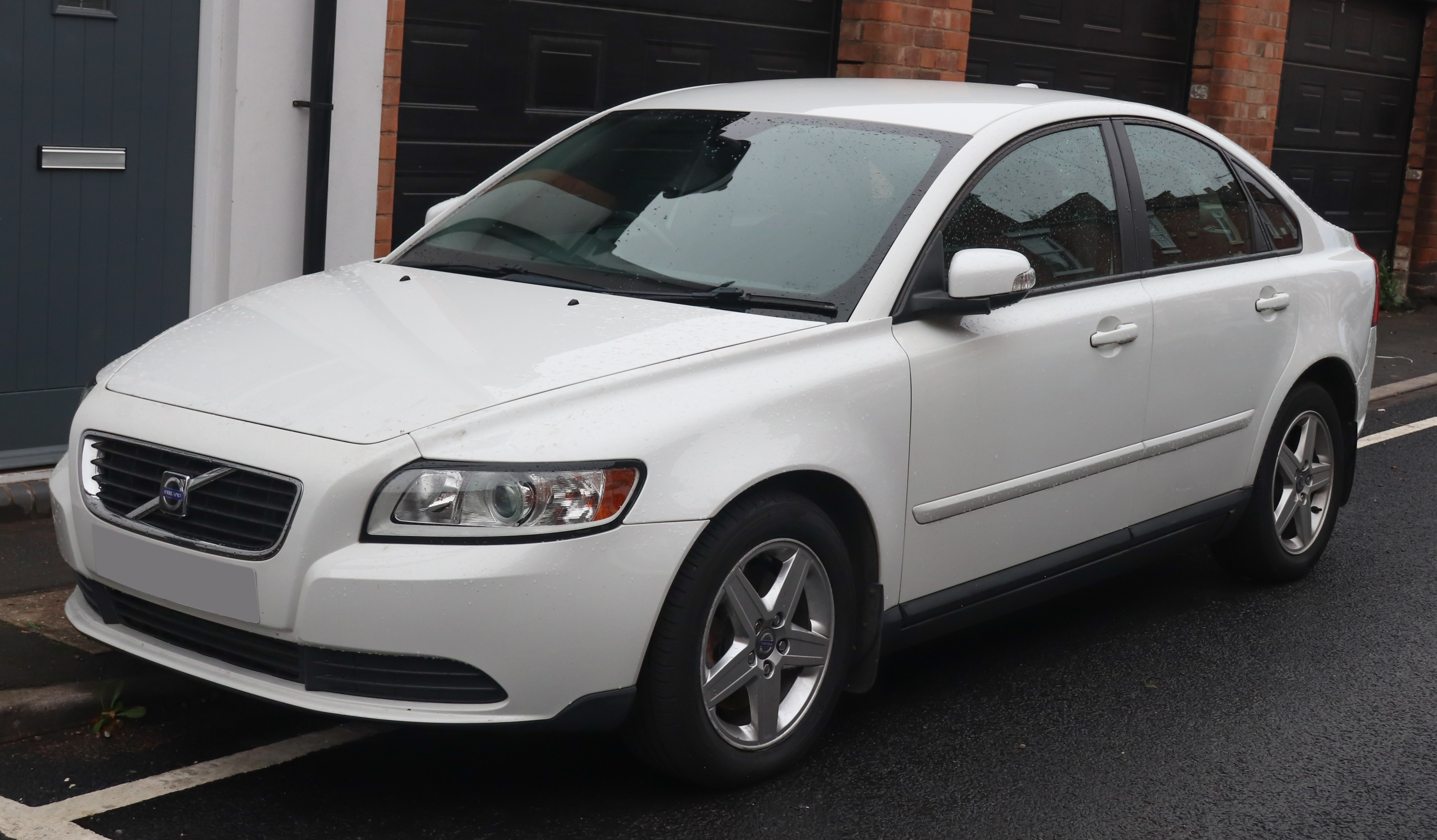

Overview
- Manufacturer: Volvo Cars
- Production: 1995–2012 (1,026,401 produced); S40: 602,910 produced V40 (1995–2004): 423,491 produced

Body and chassis
- Class: Subcompact executive car/Small family car (C)
- Layout: Front-engine, front-wheel-drive or four-wheel-drive (Note: The second generation only.)

Chronology
- Predecessor: Volvo 440/460
- Successor: Volvo V40 II

The Volvo S40 is a series of subcompact executive cars marketed and produced by the Swedish manufacturer Volvo Cars from 1995 to 2012, offered as a more mainstream alternative to the compact executive Volvo 850 and later the Volvo S60 to compete in a lower pricing bracket. The S40 was more or less positioned against premium-leaning small family cars like the Volkswagen Jetta, as well as some mass-market large family cars.

The first generation (1995–2004) was introduced in 1995 with the S40 (S from saloon) and V40 (V from versatility, estate) cars.

The second generation was released in 2003, and the estate variant became differentiated from the sedan, having its name changed to V50.

The range was replaced by the Volvo V40 five door hatchback in 2012.

== First generation (1995–2004) ==
First generation
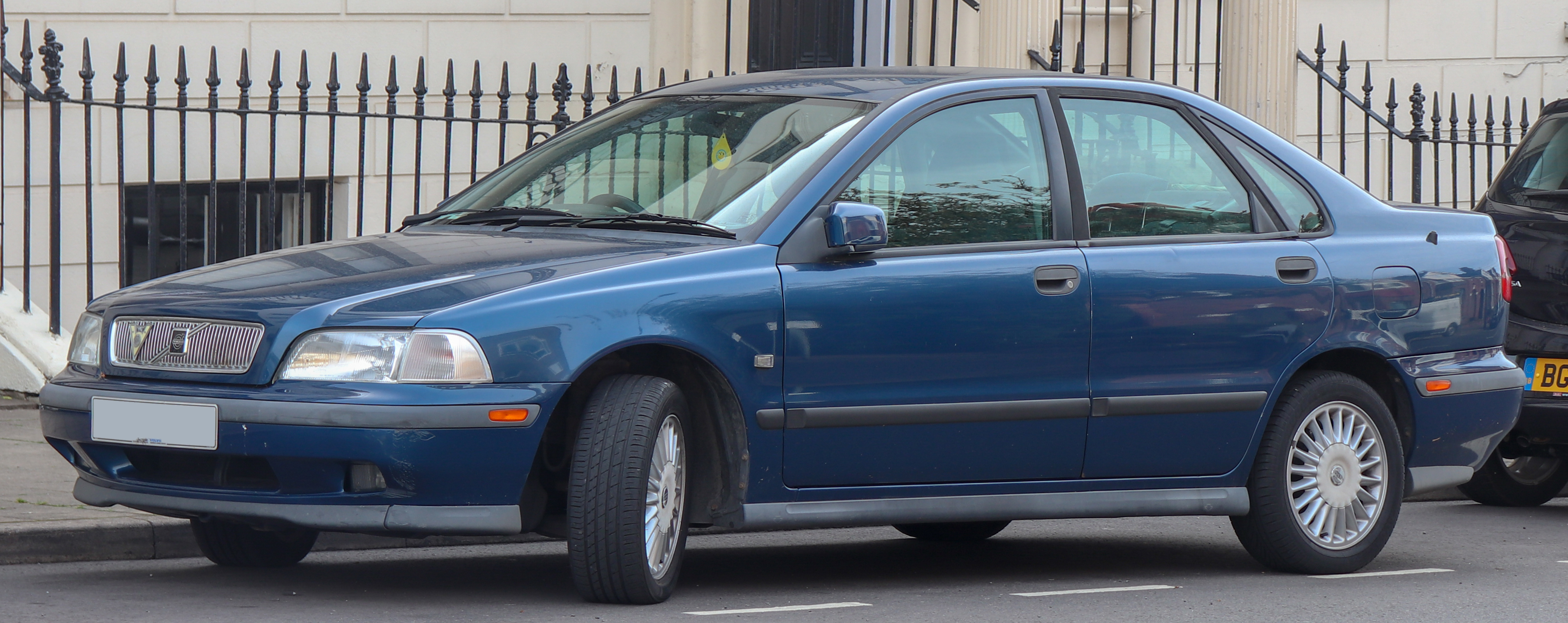

Overview
- Production: 1995–2004 (1,000,034 units)
- Model years: 1996–2004
- Assembly: Netherlands: Born (NedCar); Malaysia: Shah Alam (SMA); Botswana: Gaborone (TMBC); South Africa: Pretoria (Ford Motor Company of Southern Africa); Thailand: Samut Prakan (Thai-Swedish Assembly Co. Ltd.)
- Designer: Peter Horbury

Body and chassis
- Body style: 4-door saloon (S40); 5-door estate (V40)
- Layout: Front-engine, front-wheel-drive
- Related: Mitsubishi Carisma; Proton Waja

Powertrain
- Engine: Petrol: 1.6 L B4164S I4; 1.7 L B4184S I4; 1.8 L B4184S2/S3 I4; 1.9 L B4194T turbo I4; 1.8 L Mitsubishi B4184SJ/SM GDI I4; 2.0 L B4204S I4; 2.0 L B4204T turbo I4 (Note: Standard in North American models where it was sold with "1.9T" badging); Diesel: 1.9 L Renault D4192T turbo I4
- Transmission: 5-speed Renault M3P manual; 5-speed Renault M5P/M5D manual; 5-speed Volvo M56 manual; 4-speed Aisin AW50-42LE automatic; 5-speed Aisin AW55-50 automatic

Dimensions
- Wheelbase: 1995–2001: 2,550 mm (100.4 in); 2002–2004: 2,557 mm (100.7 in)
- Length: 2000–2001: 4,470 mm (176.0 in); 2002–2004: 4,521 mm (178.0 in)
- Width: 2000–2001: 1,720 mm (67.7 in); 2002–2004: 1,717 mm (67.6 in)
- Height: 2000–2001: 1,410 mm (55.5 in); 2002–2004: 1,423–1,426 mm (56.0–56.1 in)
- Kerb weight: S40: 1,220–1,392 kg (2,690–3,069 lb); V40: 1,234–1,414 kg (2,721–3,117 lb)

Chronology
- Successor: Volvo V50 (V40)

During August 1995, Volvo released its new series, intending to call the cars S4 and F4. However, as Audi had already reserved the "S4" name, Volvo opted to name the range S40 (saloon), and V40 (estate). These cars were manufactured at the Nedcar factory at Born in the Netherlands (a pre Ford joint venture between Volvo and Mitsubishi Motors) and based on a common platform with the Mitsubishi Carisma, later used by the Proton Waja. They were also the last Volvos to be produced at the Born plant; a lineage that had begun in the early 1970s with Volvo's collaboration with DAF that had led to the Volvo 66 and the Volvo 300 series.

In the United Kingdom, it costs approximately 50% more than the related Mitsubishi Carisma. The car helped change perceptions of Volvo: "The S40/V40 range was the car that finally persuaded buyers that Volvo really could build a credible compact executive car", reported the RAC. For the 2000 model year, Volvo expanded the S40/V40's market to North America, where this range went on sale exclusively with the 1.9 liter turbo.

The V40, with a drag coefficient of 0.32, was the first whole model to be introduced under the direction of the British designer Peter Horbury, Volvo’s design director and was marketed in Australia, South America and the Far East. The V40 was named the "Most Beautiful Estate Car in the World" at an Italian award ceremony. The official premiere was at the Frankfurt Motor Showin September 1995, with the V40 premiering in December 1995, at the Bologna Motor Show.

In July 2000, Volvo updated the 40 Series ("Phase II"), implementing several technical improvements, including improved engine management, diesel direct fuel injection, extra safety features, larger brake discs, new front suspension and steering, revised rear suspension, larger tyres and a wider track.

A minor facelift gave more streamlining, slightly different front wings and front bumper, and larger front indicators, as well as minor instruments and fascia redesign.

In late 2002, there was a subtle update to the range. On the outside, there was a new "egg crate" style grille and colour-keyed trim mouldings. Inside, there was a three-spoke steering wheel and new instruments with four dials. Other changes include improved fuel economy, new side-impact curtain airbags, updated seats and a new key with integrated remote.

The 40 Series cars were equipped with four-cylinder engines, such as a Renault-sourced 1.9 turbo diesel or 1.6 (1587 cc), 1.8 (1731 cc, later increased to 1783 cc), 2.0T (1948 cc), 1.9 T4 (1855 cc, later increased to 1948 cc) or 2.0 (1948 cc) fuel injected gasoline engines. All of the gasoline engines are derivatives of the Volvo Modular series, which started life in the Volvo 960 and was seen in both 5 and 6 cylinder layouts in Volvo's bigger FWD cars.

There was also a 1.8 L (1834 cc) petrol direct injection engine provided by Mitsubishi as part of the platform sharing between the 40 series and the Carisma. The Volvo S40/V40 series was a completely new car from the ground up, only one engine – the 1.9 turbo diesel – carried over from the old 400 Series.

The low (2.0T) and high (1.9 T4) pressure turbo variants were positioned at the top of the motor range. The 2.0T was rounded down and badged as a 1.9T and was the only engine available in North America. The five speed manual transmission, widely available in Europe, was not certified in North American S40s, with the five speed automatic as the only option. No electric CVT was planned, unlike the 440 HTA / High Tech Auto CVT that had been released before the 400 series was completely phased out.

In the United Kingdom, trim levels were S, XS, SE and CD. Later on, trim levels offered were supplemented with SE Lux and Sport Lux trim designations. A limited edition 'Xi' trim level was also offered for a short run on Phase 1 and Phase 1.5 cars, often painted yellow with black bezel headlamps.

The Volvo S40 was the first car to earn a four-star Euro-NCAP safety rating.

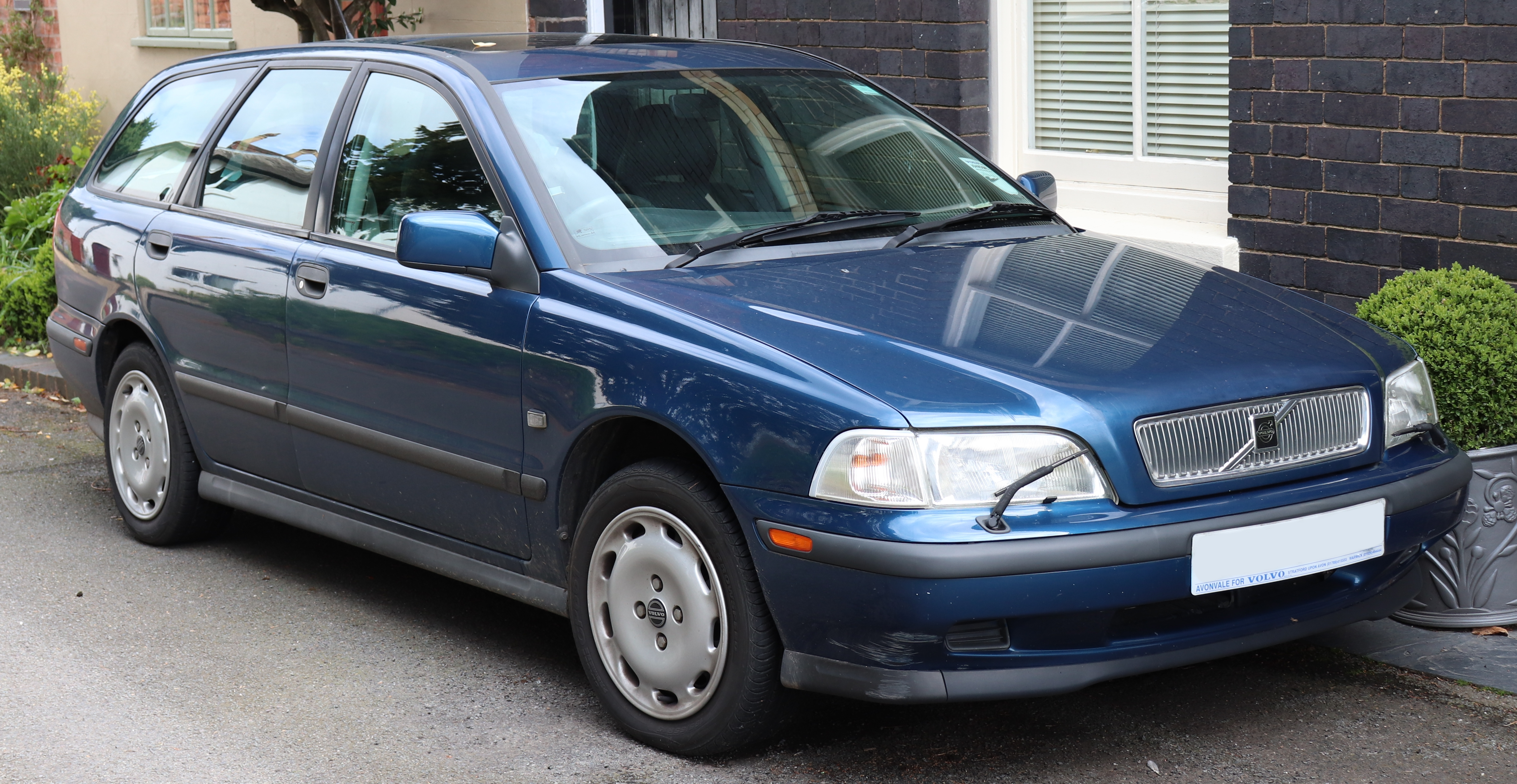
Pre facelift Volvo V40 2.0 (United Kingdom)

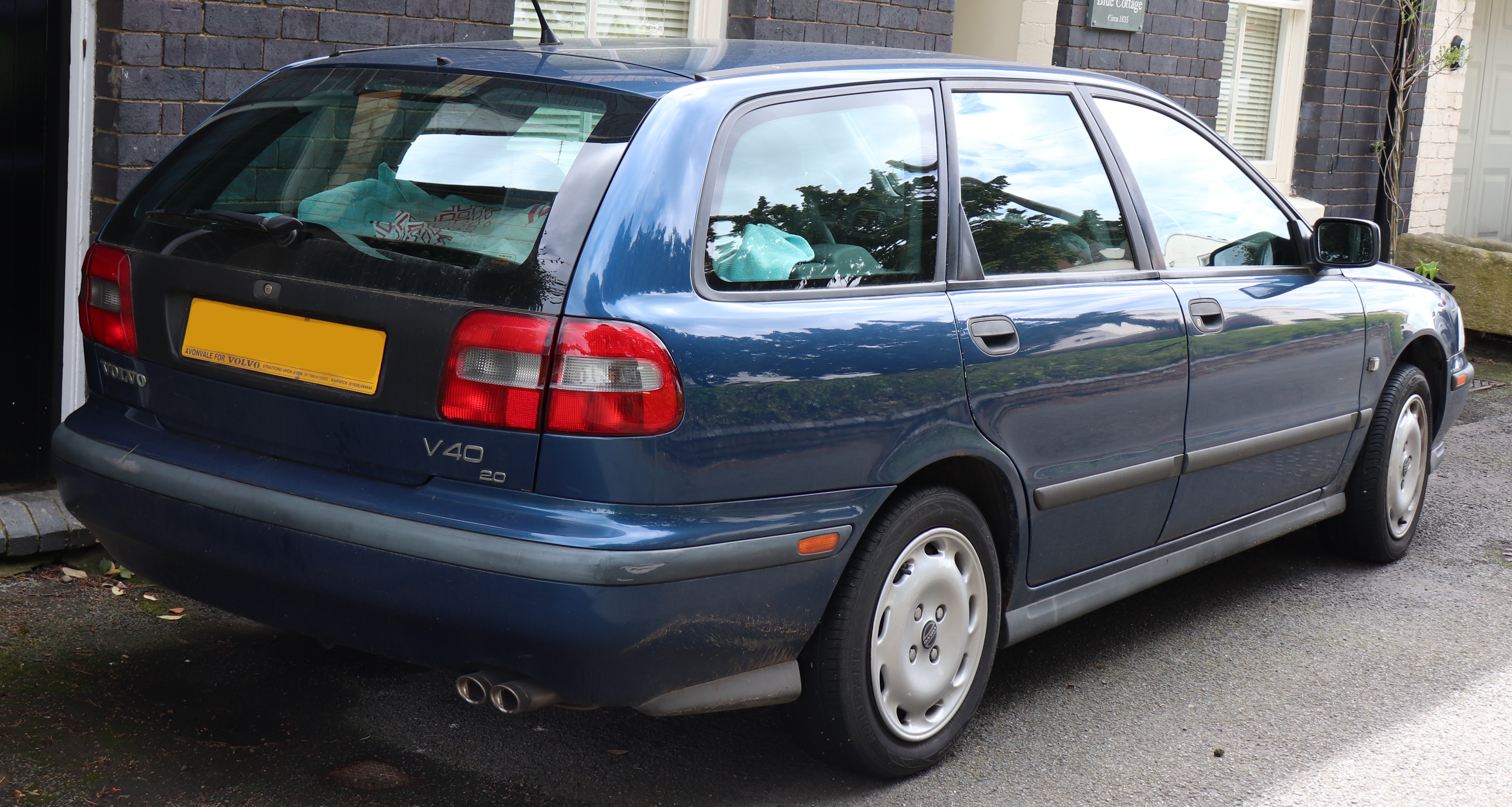
Pre facelift Volvo V40 2.0 (United Kingdom)

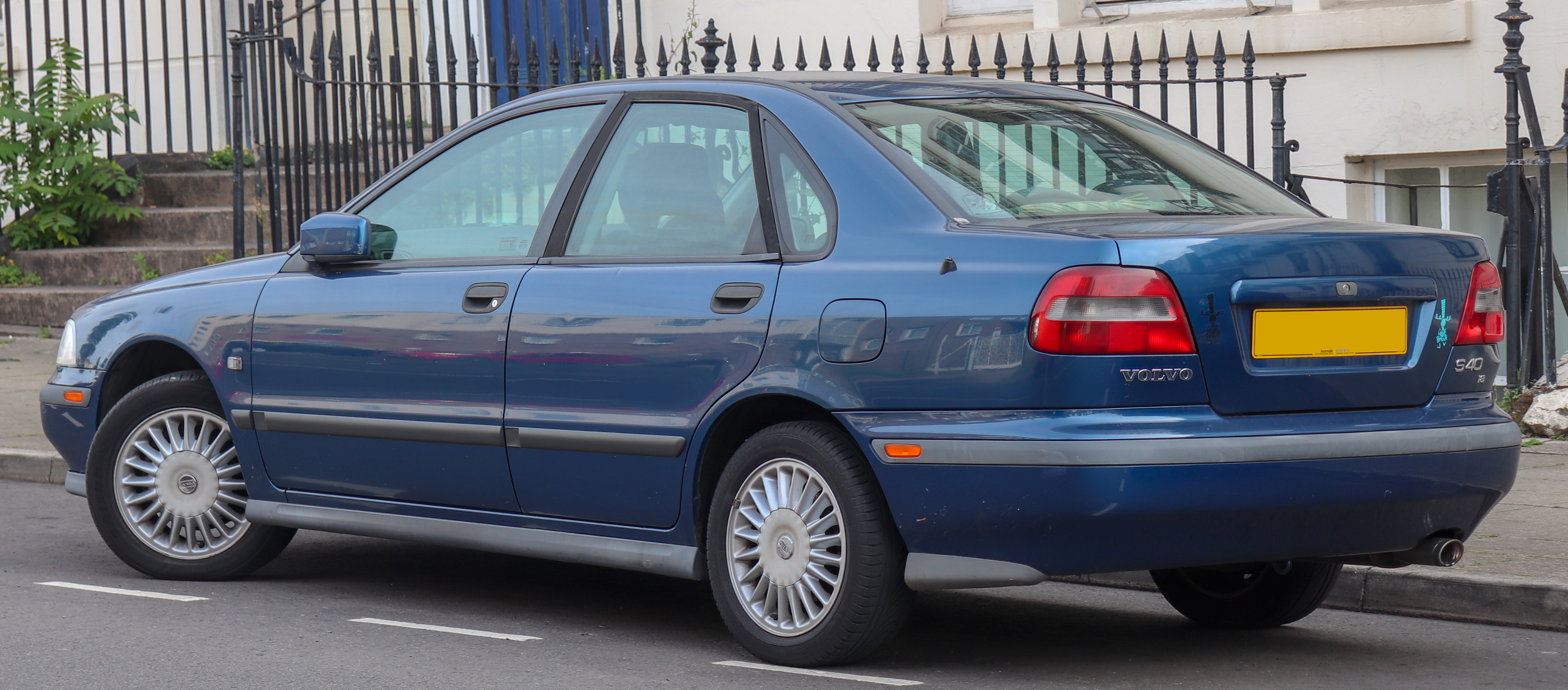
Pre facelift Volvo S40 1.8 (United Kingdom)

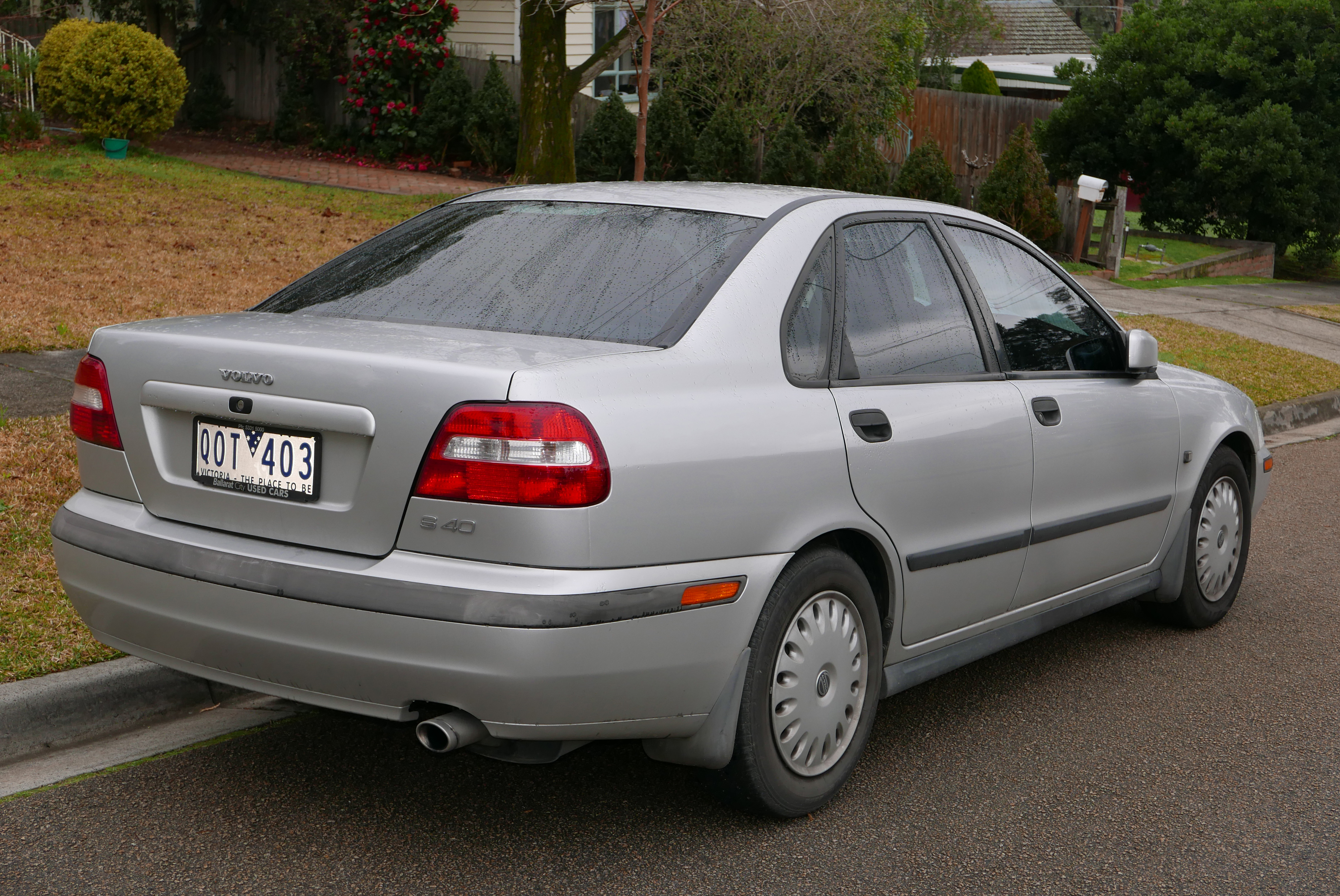
Facelift Volvo S40 1.8 (Australia)

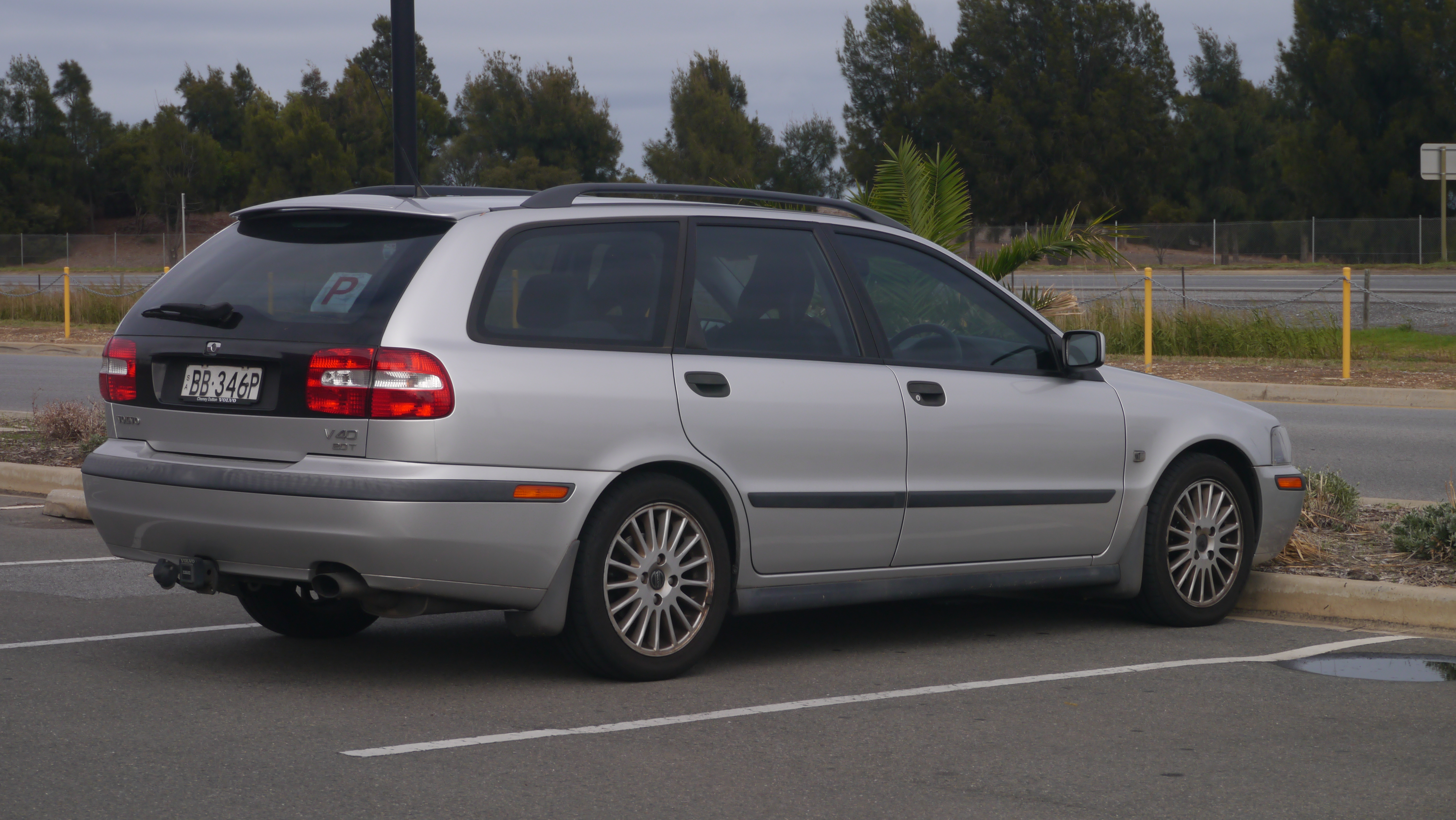
Facelift Volvo V40 2.0T (Australia)

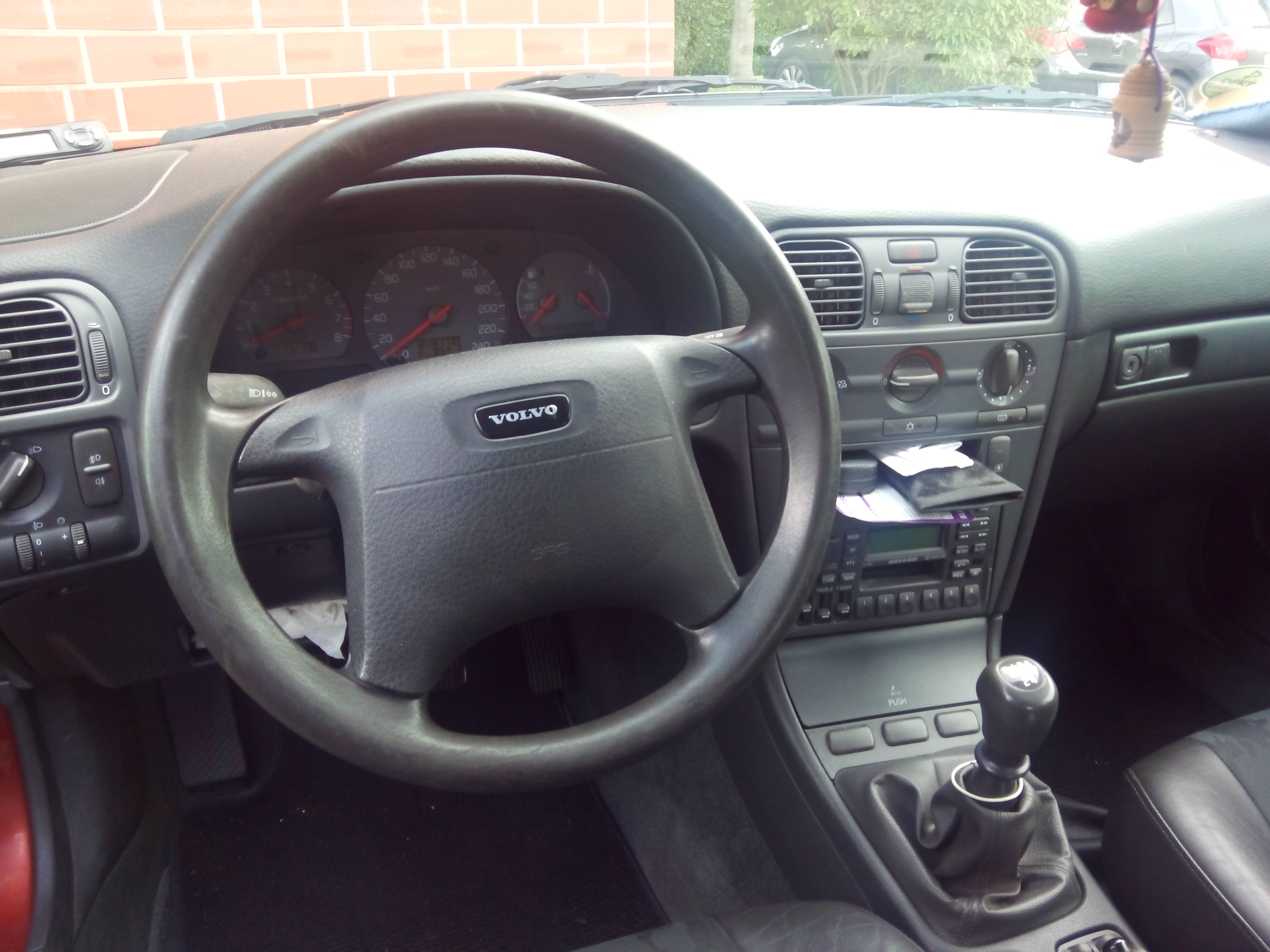
Interior

=== Engines ===
Petrol engines
Model	Engine code	Year(s)	Power at rpm	Torque at rpm	Displacement
1.6	B4164S	1996–1999	105 PS (77 kW; 104 hp) at 5500	143 N⋅m (105 lb⋅ft) at 4200	1,587 cc (96.8 cu in)
1.6	B4164S2	2000–2004	109 PS (80 kW; 108 hp) at 5800	145 N⋅m (107 lb⋅ft) at 4000	1,587 cc (96.8 cu in)
1.8	B4184S	1995–1999	115 PS (85 kW; 113 hp) at 5500	165 N⋅m (122 lb⋅ft) at 4100	1,783 cc (108.8 cu in)
1.8i	B4184SJ/SM	1998–2001	125 PS (92 kW; 123 hp) at 5500	174 N⋅m (128 lb⋅ft) at 3750	1,834 cc (111.9 cu in)
2.0	B4204S	1995–2000	140 PS (103 kW; 138 hp) at 6000	183 N⋅m (135 lb⋅ft) at 4500	1,948 cc (118.9 cu in)
2.0	B4204S2	2000–2004	136 PS (100 kW; 134 hp) at 6000	190 N⋅m (140 lb⋅ft) at 4000	1,948 cc (118.9 cu in)
2.0 T	B4204T	1998–1999	160 PS (118 kW; 158 hp) at 5100	230 N⋅m (170 lb⋅ft) at 1800–4800	1,948 cc (118.9 cu in)
2.0 T	B4204T2	2000	160 PS (118 kW; 158 hp) at 5100	230 N⋅m (170 lb⋅ft) at 1800–4800	1,948 cc (118.9 cu in)
2.0 T	B4204T3	2001–2004	163 PS (120 kW; 161 hp) at 5250	240 N⋅m (177 lb⋅ft) at 1800–4500	1,948 cc (118.9 cu in)
2.0 T	B4204T4	2003–2004	172 PS (127 kW; 170 hp) at 5500	240 N⋅m (180 lb⋅ft) at 1800–5000	1,948 cc (118.9 cu in)
T4	B4194T	1998–1999	200 PS (147 kW; 197 hp) at 5500	300 N⋅m (221 lb⋅ft) at 2400–3600	1,855 cc (113.2 cu in)
T4	B4194T2	2000	200 PS (147 kW; 197 hp) at 5500	300 N⋅m (221 lb⋅ft) at 2400–3600	1,855 cc (113.2 cu in)
T4	B4204T5	2001–2003	200 PS (147 kW; 197 hp) at 5500	300 N⋅m (221 lb⋅ft) at 2500–4000	1,948 cc (118.9 cu in)

Diesel engines
Model	Engine code	Year(s)	Power at rpm	Torque at rpm	Displacement
1.9D	D4192T	1996–1999	90 PS (66 kW; 89 hp) at 4250	176 N⋅m (130 lb⋅ft) at 2250	1,870 cc (114.1 cu in)
1.9D	D4192T2	1999–2000	95 PS (70 kW; 94 hp) at 4000	190 N⋅m (140 lb⋅ft) at 2000	1,870 cc (114.1 cu in)
1.9D	D4192T3	2000–2004	116 PS (85 kW; 114 hp) at 4000	265 N⋅m (195 lb⋅ft) at 1750–3250	1,870 cc (114.1 cu in)
1.9D	D4192T4	2000–2004	102 PS (75 kW; 101 hp) at 4000	215 N⋅m (159 lb⋅ft) at 1750–3250	1,870 cc (114.1 cu in)

=== Sales ===
==== S40 ====
Calendar year	United States	Canada
2000	29,862	1,682
2001	22,451	1,735
2002	15,383	1,454
2003	13,058	1,195
2004	4,726	279

Total produced: 576,543

==== V40 sales ====
Calendar year	Worldwide
2000	156,498 (S40/V40 combined)
2001	69,012
2002	61,475
2003	53,592
2004	

Total produced: 423,491

=== Limited editions ===
==== Super Tourer (Australia) ====
A special edition of the S40 T4 and V40 T4 sold in Australia in 2000. These were available in Panama Yellow, black or silver and came with headlights with black bezels, leather upholstery and 16" "Ares" alloy wheels.

==== Sports Pack ====
Introduced in February 2003 was the S40 and V40 Sports Pack. These models featured the sports chassis with Nivomat body levelling, 17" "Arcadia" wheels, headlamps with black bezels, clear side side marker lights, body-coloured trim and chrome door handles.

These were available only in Silver, Sapphire Black and Virtual Blue (all metallic), and featured side sills and the lower sections of the front and rear spoilers painted in Titanium Grey metallic. Interior colour was black with combination cloth/leather trim.

=== Motorsport ===
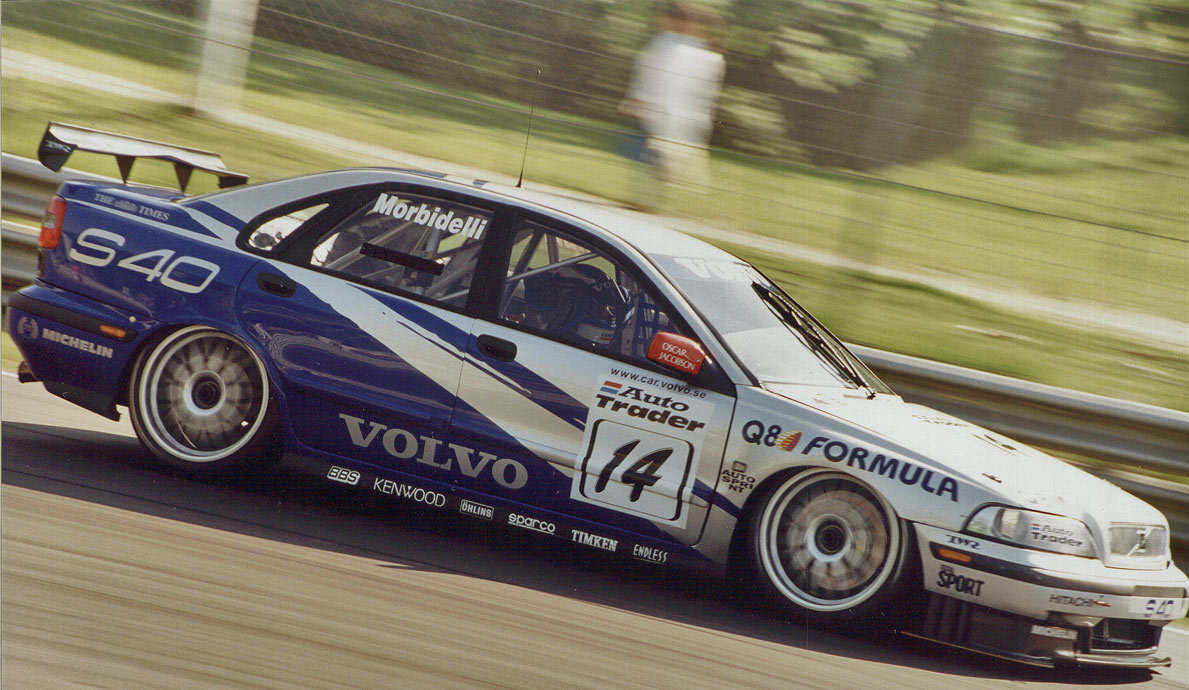
Gianni Morbidelli competing in the 1998 British Touring Car Championship in a Volvo S40

The S40 was homologated for racing in the Super Touring category on 1 January 1997. It competed in the British Touring Car Championship with Tom Walkinshaw Racing between 1997 and 1999 with Rickard Rydell winning the 1998 title. In Australia, Rickard Rydell and Jim Richards won the 1998 AMP Bathurst 1000. The S40 also competed in the Australian Super Touring Championship with Volvo Dealer Racing in 1998 and 1999, with Volvo winning the Manufacturers Championship in its second year. It also competed in the Swedish Touring Car Championship and the 2003 Norwegian Touring Car Championship.

== Second generation (2003–2012) ==
For the station wagon variant, see Volvo V50. For the convertible variant, see Volvo C70. For the hatchback variant, see Volvo C30.

Second generation
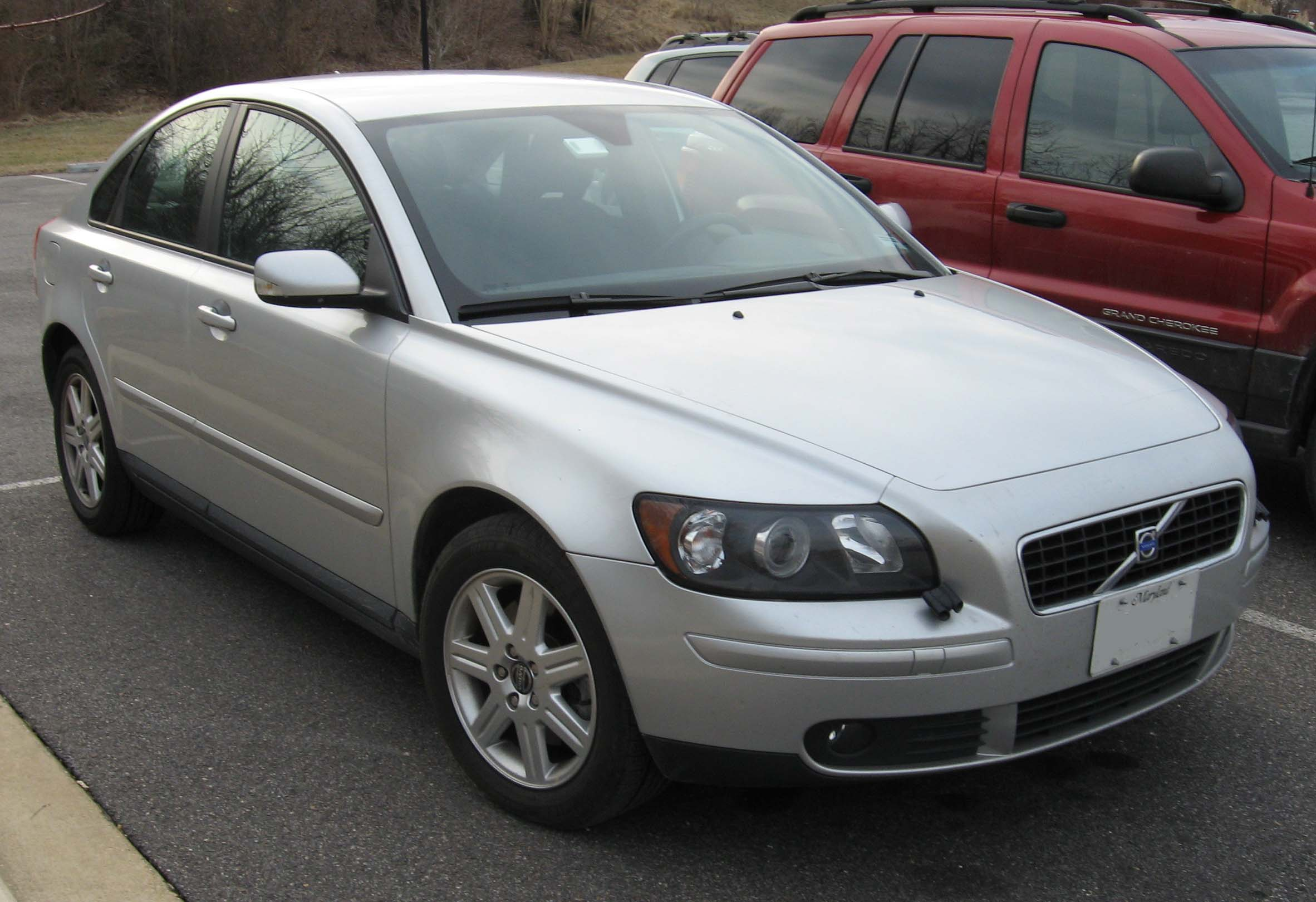

Overview
- Production: 2003–2012
- Model years: 2004–2012
- Assembly: Belgium: Ghent (VCG); China: Chongqing (CFMA); Malaysia: Shah Alam (SMA); South Africa: Pretoria
- Designer: Fedde Talsma

Body and chassis
- Body style: 4-door saloon
- Layout: Front-engine, front-wheel-drive or four-wheel-drive
- Platform: Ford Global C-car Platform
- Related: Volvo V50; Volvo C30; Volvo C70 II; Mazda3 (BK); Ford Focus Mk2

Powertrain
- Engine: petrol: 1.6 L Duratec I4; 1.8 L L8-DE I4; 2.0 L LF-DE I4; 2.4 L B5244S I5; 2.5 L B5254T turbo I5; diesel: 1.6 L D4164T I4; 2.0 L D4204T I4; 2.0 L D5204T I5; 2.4 L D5244T I5; 2.0 L I4
- Transmission: 5-speed Volvo/Getrag M56 manual; 6-speed Volvo/Getrag M66 manual; 5-speed Volvo/Aisin AW55-50 manumatic automatic (Geartronic); 6-speed Aisin TF-80SC automatic

Dimensions
- Wheelbase: 2,640 mm (103.9 in)
- Length: 2003–2005: 4,468 mm (175.9 in); 2006–2007: 4,475 mm (176.2 in); 2008–2012: 4,483 mm (176.5 in)
- Width: 1,770 mm (69.7 in)
- Height: FWD: 1,452 mm (57.2 in); AWD: 1,470 mm (57.9 in)
- Curb weight: FWD: 1,435–1,505 kg (3,164–3,318 lb); AWD: 1,552–1,579 kg (3,422–3,481 lb)

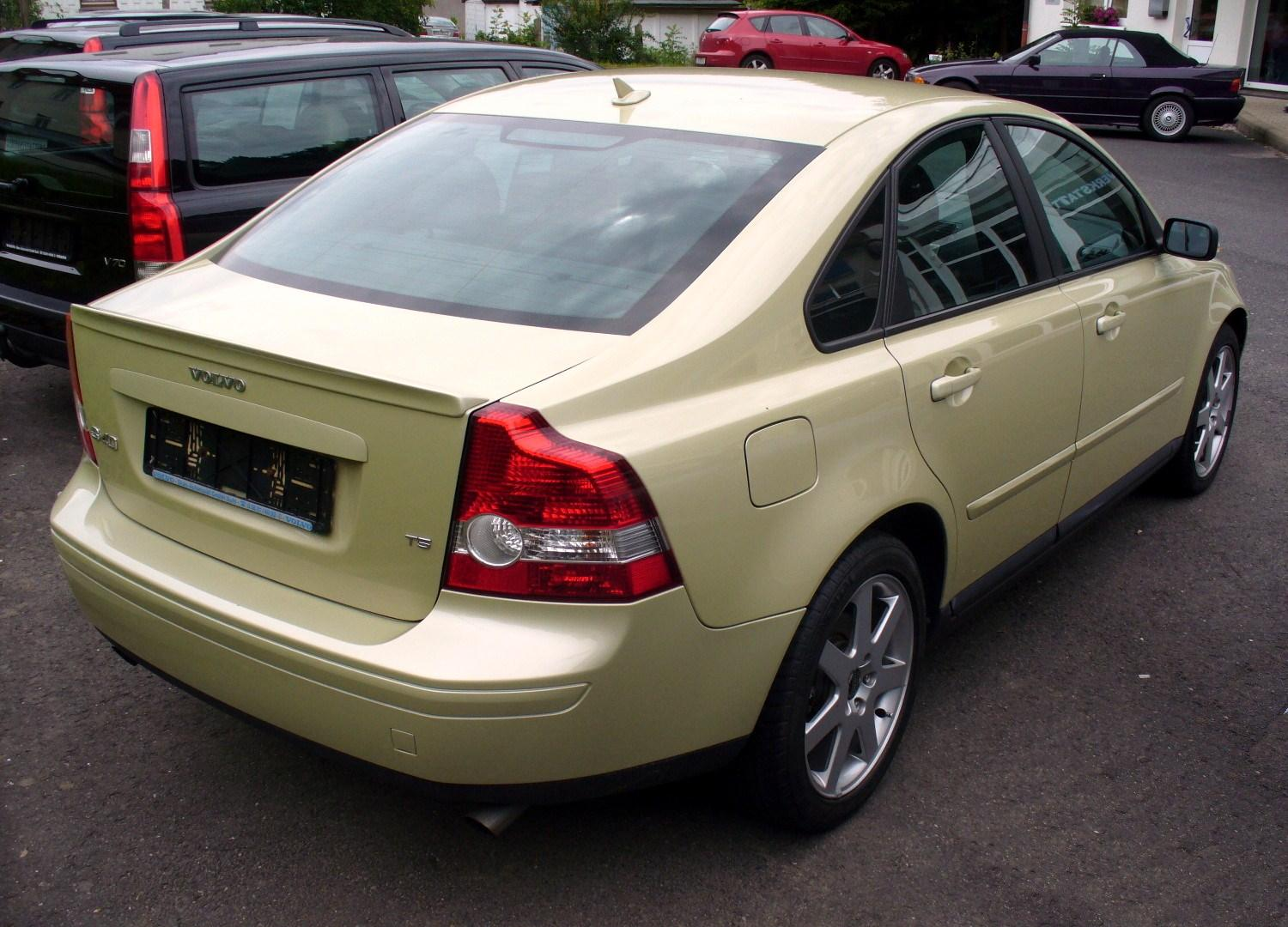
Volvo S40 pre-facelift

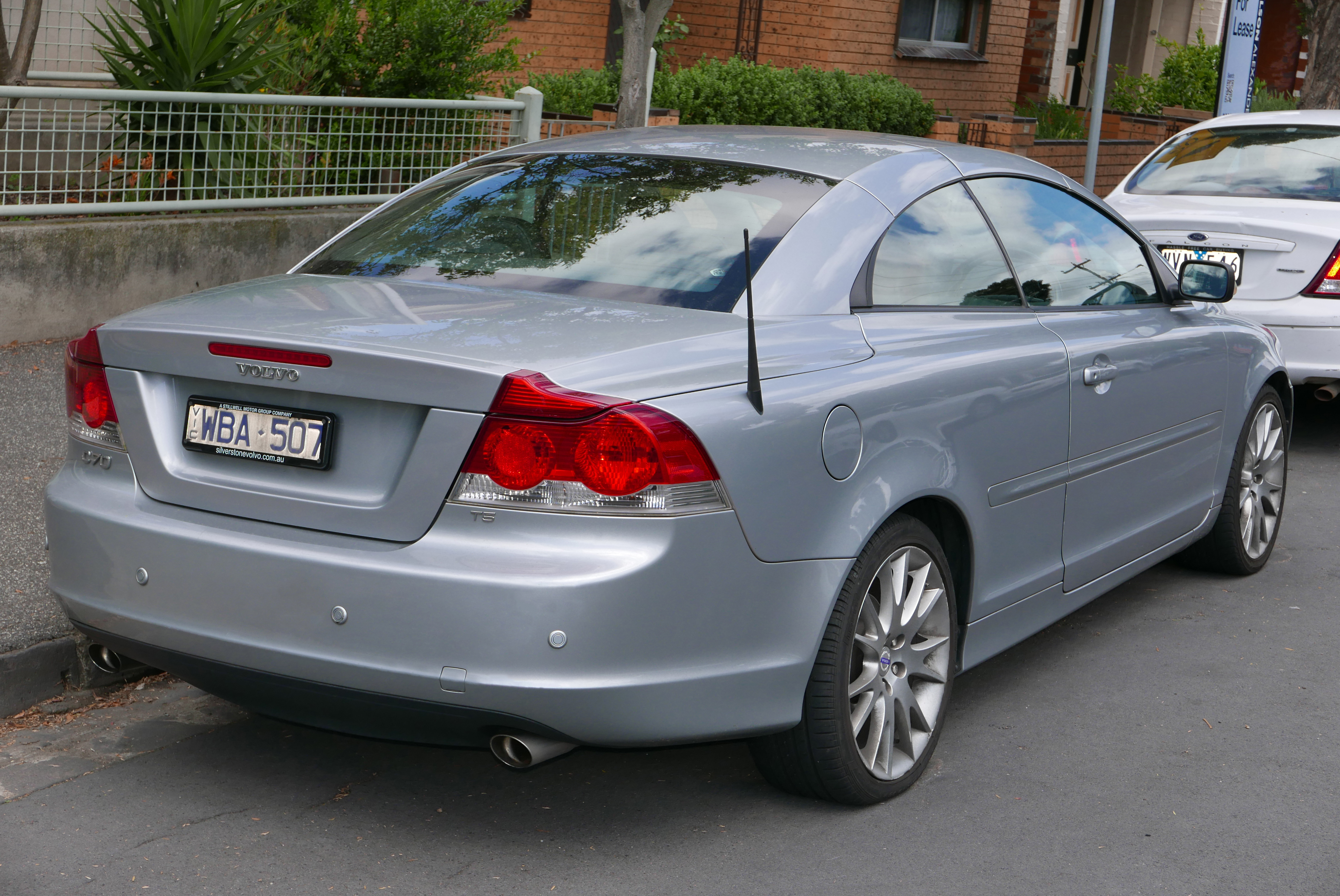
Volvo C70, hardtop convertible based on the same platform

First shown at the September 2003 Frankfurt Motor Show, with production commencing in October, the second generation S40 introduced a new design based on the Volvo P1 platform built at the Volvo Cars factory in Ghent, Belgium. Going on sale part way through the 2004 model year, it is sometimes known as the 2004.5 Volvo S40. 4,566 examples were built in calendar year 2003, with 16 cars having been registered in Sweden. A few months later, the V40 was replaced by the estate V50, also based on the P1 platform and built in Ghent.

The S40 was nominated for the World Car of the Year award for 2005, and won the Canadian Car of the Year Best New Sport Compact award for 2005. It was also elected the South African Car of the Year for 2005 by the South African Guild of Motoring Journalists.

The chassis for this car and the majority of its components were developed by Volvo, however similar mechanical components can be found in the Mazda3 and the European Ford Focus. It had the latest generation of Volvo's modular five cylinder engines; the first of Volvo's smaller range to get more than four cylinders.

The inline-fives were frequently improved upon by Volvo since the engine's debut in 1991 for the 1992 model year Volvo 850. The top-of-the-line S40/V50 T5 AWD, as well as the 2.4 and 2.4i, powertrain is still made by Volvo. The transmission is developed with Getrag at Volvo's Köping Transmission Center in Sweden, and the AWD system bought from Haldex Traction of Sweden.

The S40/V50 T5 (one of the several variants) features the 2.5 L B5254T3 (later B5254T7) (2521 cc) five-cylinder fuel-injected engine with a high pressure turbocharger. The valvetrain has four valves per cylinder and is a DOHC design.

The engine is transversely mounted at the front of the vehicle and was available with the M66W (front wheel drive) or M66C (all wheel drive) drivetrains. In the United States, the manual (six speed) transmission was only available on the V50 in 2006, 2007 and 2010 and only with AWD and R-line trim.

The initial 2.0 diesel engine was the DW10, produced by PSA. A new range of engines and transmissions were introduced at the end of May 2010 (see "engine specifications" below).

There was also 1.8 L (Mazda L engine) petrol version available in the European markets.

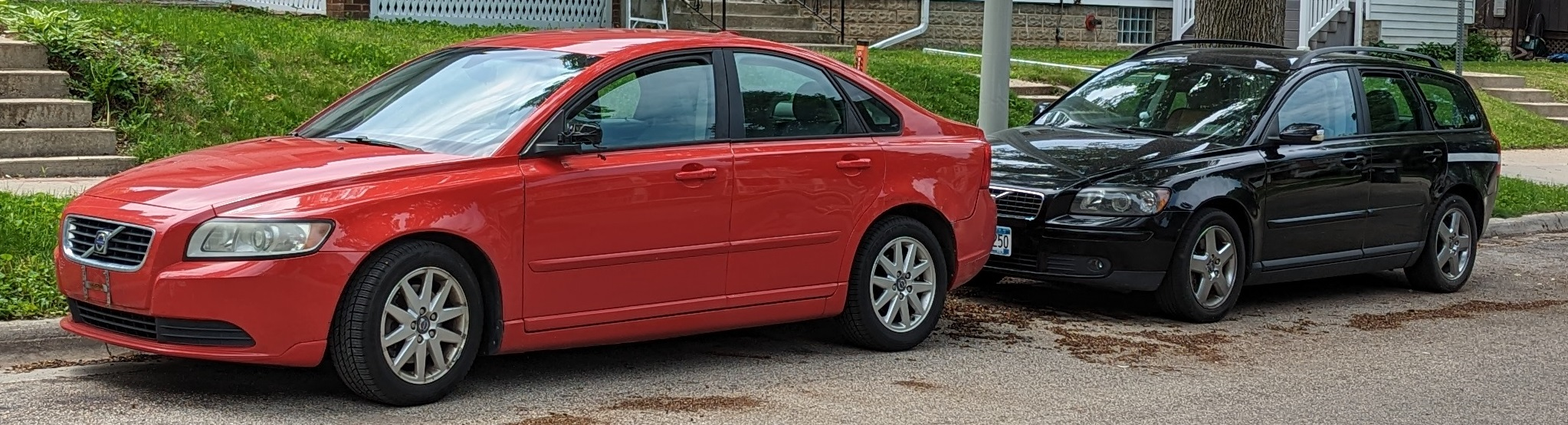
Volvo S40 parked next to Volvo V50, the station wagon variant

=== Engines ===
Petrol engines
Model	Engine code	Model year(s)	Power at rpm	Torque at rpm	Displacement	Comment
1.6	B4164S2, -S3	2005–2012	100 PS (74 kW; 99 hp) at 6000	150 N⋅m (111 lb⋅ft) at 4000	1,596 cc (97.4 cu in)	I4 16V Multipoint fuel injection
1.8	B4184S2, -S11	2005–2010	125 PS (92 kW; 123 hp) at 6000	165 N⋅m (122 lb⋅ft) 4000	1,798 cc (109.7 cu in)	I4 16V Multipoint fuel injection
1.8F Flexifuel	B4184S2, -S8	2006–2010	125 PS (92 kW; 123 hp) at 6000	165 N⋅m (122 lb⋅ft) 4000	1,798 cc (109.7 cu in)	I4 16V Multipoint fuel injection (E85 compatible)
2.0	B4204S3, -S5	2004–2012	145 PS (107 kW; 143 hp) at 6000	185 N⋅m (136 lb⋅ft) 4500	1,999 cc (122.0 cu in)	I4 16V Multipoint fuel injection
2.0F Flexifuel	B4204S4	2011–2012	145 PS (107 kW; 143 hp) at 6000	185 N⋅m (136 lb⋅ft) 4500	1,999 cc (122.0 cu in)	I4 16V Multipoint fuel injection (E85 compatible)
2.4	B5244S5	2004–2010	140 PS (103 kW; 138 hp) 5000	220 N⋅m (162 lb⋅ft) 4000	2,435 cc (148.6 cu in)	I5 20V Multipoint fuel injection
2.4i	B5244S4	2004–2010	170 PS (125 kW; 168 hp) 6000	230 N⋅m (170 lb⋅ft) 4400	2,435 cc (148.6 cu in)	I5 20V Multipoint fuel injection
T5	B5254T3	2005–2008	220 PS (162 kW; 217 hp) 5000	320 N⋅m (236 lb⋅ft) 1500–4800	2,521 cc (153.8 cu in)	I5 20V Turbo Multipoint fuel injection
T5	B5254T7	2008–2012	230 PS (169 kW; 227 hp) 5000	320 N⋅m (236 lb⋅ft) 1500–5000	2,521 cc (153.8 cu in)	I5 20V Turbo Multipoint fuel injection

Diesel engines
Model	Engine code	Model year(s)	Power at rpm	Torque at rpm	Displacement	Comment
1.6D	D4164T	2005–2010	109 PS (80 kW; 108 hp) at 4000	240 N⋅m (177 lb⋅ft) at 1750	1,560 cc (95.2 cu in)	I4 16v Turbo Multipoint direct fuel injection
1.6D DRIVe	D4164T	2005–2010	109 PS (80 kW; 108 hp) at 4000	240 N⋅m (177 lb⋅ft) at 1750	1,560 cc (95.2 cu in)	I4 16v Turbo Multipoint direct fuel injection
D2	D4162T	2011–2012	115 PS (85 kW; 113 hp) at 3600	270 N⋅m (199 lb⋅ft) at 1750	1,560 cc (95.2 cu in)	I4 8v Turbo Common rail direct injection
D2 DRIVe	D4162T	2011–2012	115 PS (85 kW; 113 hp) at 3600	270 N⋅m (199 lb⋅ft) at 1750	1,560 cc (95.2 cu in)	I4 8v Turbo Common rail direct injection
2.0D	D4204T	2004–2010	136 PS (100 kW; 134 hp) 4000	320 N⋅m (236 lb⋅ft) at 2000	1,997 cc (121.9 cu in)	I4 16v Turbo Multipoint direct fuel injection
2.0D (France)	D4204T2	2005–2006	133 PS (98 kW; 131 hp) 4000	320 N⋅m (236 lb⋅ft) at 2000	1,997 cc (121.9 cu in)	I4 16v Turbo Multipoint direct fuel injection
D3	D5204T5	2011–2012	150 PS (110 kW; 148 hp) 3500	350 N⋅m (258 lb⋅ft) 1500–2750	1,984 cc (121.1 cu in)	I5 20v Turbo Common rail direct injection
D4	D5204T	2011–2012	177 PS (130 kW; 175 hp) 3500	400 N⋅m (295 lb⋅ft) 1500–2750	1,984 cc (121.1 cu in)	I5 20v Turbo Common rail direct injection
D5	D5244T8	2006–2010	180 PS (132 kW; 178 hp) 4000	350 N⋅m (258 lb⋅ft) 1750–3250	2,400 cc (146.5 cu in)	I5
2.4D (Belgium)	D5244T9	2007–2008	163 PS (120 kW; 161 hp) 5500	340 N⋅m (251 lb⋅ft) 1750–2750	2,400 cc (146.5 cu in)	I5
D5 (Belgium)	D5244T9	2009–2010	163 PS (120 kW; 161 hp) 4000	340 N⋅m (251 lb⋅ft) 1750–3000	2,400 cc (146.5 cu in)	I5
D5	D5244T13	2009–2010	180 PS (132 kW; 178 hp) 4000	400 N⋅m (295 lb⋅ft) 2000–2750	2,400 cc (146.5 cu in)	I5

=== Marketing ===
Volvo launched an advertising campaign for the S40 titled The Mystery of Dalarö, using a documentary style video approach. The eight minute film was credited to fictitious Venezuelan film maker Carlos Soto. In fact, as was disclosed later, it was directed by Spike Jonze.

The film is set on 25 October 2003, where 32 people supposedly purchased a Volvo S40, at the same local Volvo dealership in Dalarö, a small village to the south east of Stockholm. In addition to this film, a four minute documentary of the documentary, calling into question the validity of the events, was posted as Soto's "personal edit" on his alleged homepage.

The S40 was the first Volvo car to be launched in China by the brand under the Changan Ford Mazda joint venture and commenced production in March 2006. Engines choices consisted of the 2.0, 2.4 and 2.5 litre petrol engines paired with either a 5 speed manual or 6 speed dual clutch gearbox.

=== Facelift ===
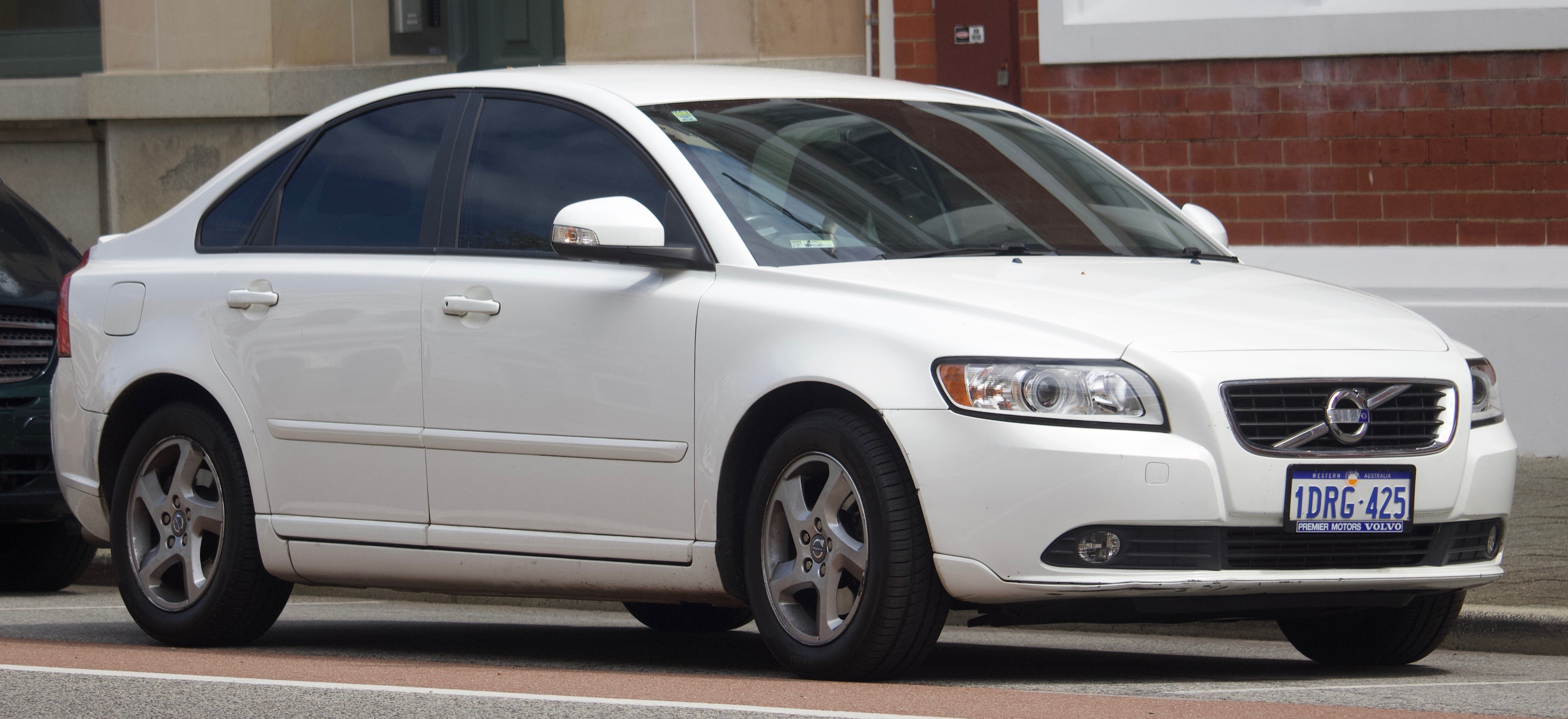
Facelift Volvo S40 T5 (Australia)

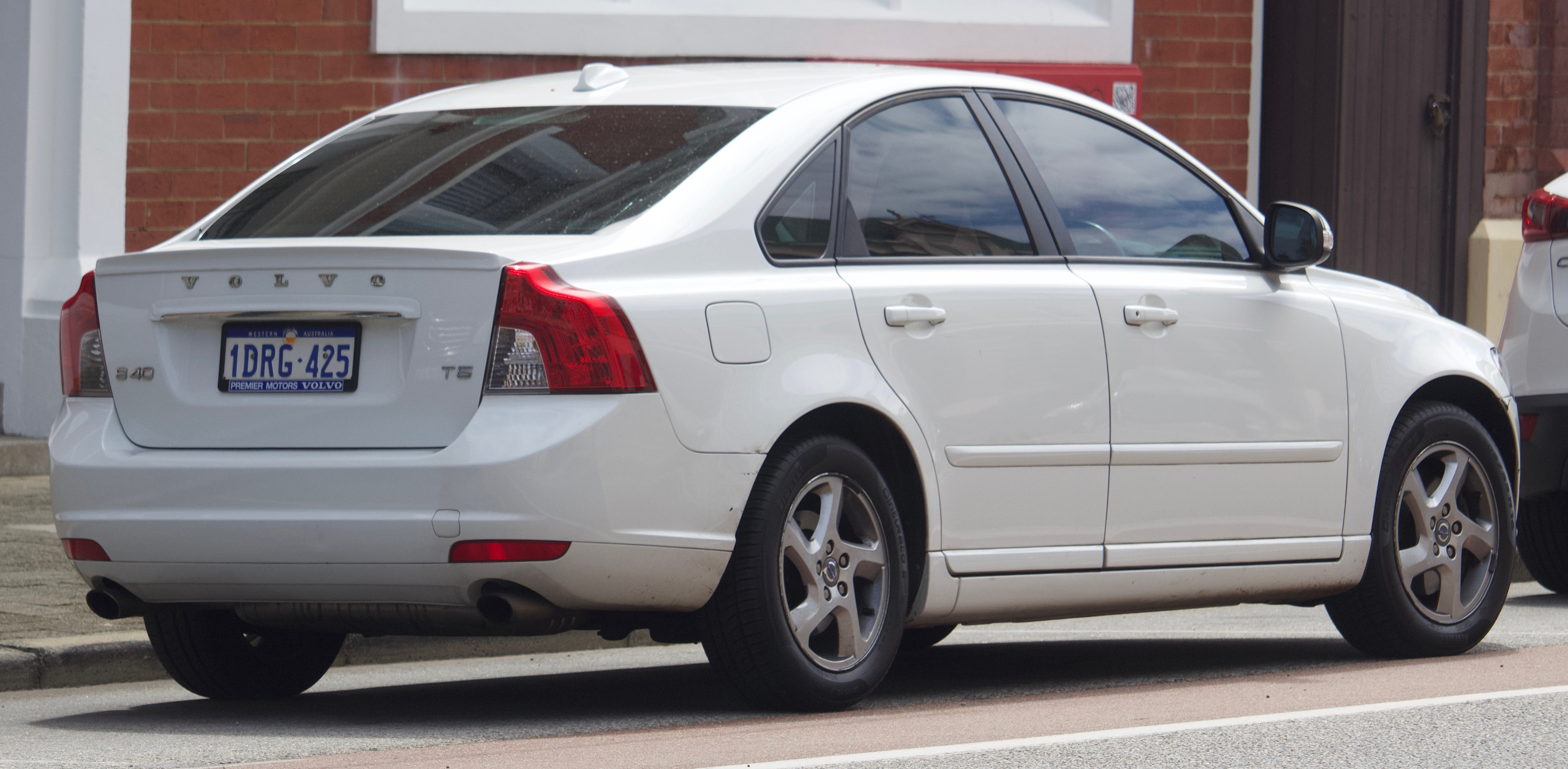
Facelift Volvo S40 T5 (Australia)

The S40 was refreshed for April 2007. Improvements include improved audio systems, increased storage space and new safety features like emergency brake lights which flash rapidly during hard braking to alert traffic behind the car. The new S40 also comes with optional active bi xenon headlights which point the light beam in the direction of the road as it curves (standard in SE Lux models).

There was also an optional BLIS (blind spot information system) camera located on the side mirrors which alerts the driver of passing vehicles beside the car.

Volvo released the 2.0 litre diesel Powershift on the third week of February 2008, except in Ireland, where it was released in the last week of May, because of delivery intervals.

The T5 model received a new engine (the B5254T7) with a performance increase of 9 hp (6.7 kW), giving an output of 227 hp (169 kW)at the crank The D5 engine became available with a manual gearbox offering 520 N⋅m (380 ft⋅lbf) of torque and an automatic transmission offering 490 N⋅m (360 ft⋅lbf) in the second half of 2007.

The model of 2009 saw rear end boot lid changes, with wider spacing of the 'Volvo' lettering and larger characters, as in the newer Volvo models.

In 2010, the new, larger, circular Volvo logo appeared on the front grille, in the United States, a manual transmission was briefly available with the T5 AWD version. In North America, the naturally aspirated five cylinder engine, all wheel drive, and manual transmission were all dropped for the model year of 2011, leaving only the automatic, front wheel drive T5 in base and R-Design trims. The model year of 2011 was the last for the S40 in the United States and Canada.

=== Engine specifications (2011) ===
From the end of May 2010, a new range of engines were available for the so called "2011 model".

The range now included three petrol engines (1.6, 2.0 and T5, the latter only available with front-wheel drive and automatic transmission), four diesel engines (the existing DRIVe and the new D2, D3 and D4) and the 2.0F flexible-fuel engine that can run either on normal petrol or E85, an ethanol petrol mixture. Production ended in May 2012.

The updated 2.0 and T5 and the new D2, D3 and D4 are compliant with the Euro 5 emission standard (the rest are Euro 4 compliant), and the DRIVe included a start-stop system for reduced fuel consumption and emissions. New six speed gearboxes are used in the D2 (manual: B6 D2), D3 and D4 (manual: M66D, automatic: Aisin AWF21).

Specification		S40 1.6	S40 1.6 (2010)	S40 2.0	S40 T5	S40 DRIVe	S40 D2	S40 D3 (*)	S40 D4	S40 2.0F FLEXIFUEL
Engine	Type	4-cyl.	4-cyl. Turbo	4-cyl.	5-cyl. Turbo	4-cyl. Turbo	4-cyl. Turbo	5-cyl. Turbo	5-cyl. Turbo	4-cyl.
Engine	Fuel	Petrol	Petrol	Petrol	Petrol	Diesel	Diesel	Diesel	Diesel	Petrol/E85
Engine	Valves	16	16	16	20	16	8	20	20	16
Engine	cc	1596	1596	1999	2521	1560	1560	1984	1984	1999
Power	kW	74	110	107	169	80	84	110	130	107
Power	PS	100	150	145	227	109	115	150	177	145
Power	at rpm	6000	6000	6000	5000	4000	3600	3500	3500	6000
Torque	Nm	150	195	185	490	240	270	350	400	185
Torque	at rpm	4000	4500	1500–5000	1750	1750	1500–2750	1750–2750	1750–2750	
Transmission	manual	5-speed	5-speed	—	6 speed	6-speed	6-speed	6-speed	6-speed	
Transmission	auto	—	—	5-speed	5-speed	—	6-speed	6-speed	—	
Top speed	manual	185 km/h	220 km/h	210 km/h	275 km/h	190 km/h	195 km/h	N/A (*)	220 km/h	210 km/h
Top speed	auto	—	—	235 km/h	275 km/h	—	N/A (*)	215 km/h	—	
0–100 km/h (0-62 mph)	manual	11.9 s	6.8 s	9.5 s	5.7s	11.4 s	9.5 s	8.7 s	9.5 s	
0–100 km/h (0-62 mph)	auto	—	—	—	6.2s	—	9.6 s	8.8 s	—	
Fuel consumption l/100 km (urban/extra-urban/combined)	manual	9.2/5.8/7.1	10.8/5.7/7.6	—	—	5.2/3.8/4.3	7.0/4.0/5.0	7.0/4.0/5.0	10.9/5.8/7.7	
Fuel consumption l/100 km (urban/extra-urban/combined)	auto	—	—	13.5/6.5/9.0	-/-/10.1	—	7.6/4.5/5.6	7.6/4.5/5.6	—	
CO2 emissions	manual	169 g/km	176 g/km	—	104 g/km	114 g/km	134 g/km	134 g/km	183 g/km	
CO2 emissions	auto	—	—	211 g/km	—	—	149 g/km	149 g/km	—	

(*) Available from September 2010

Note updated: In 2012 the last variant of the S40 2.0 Comfort, was the same 2.0 Petrol Engine, but with a PowerShift 6 speed automatic transmission. Adding to this, was a little differences in headlights and tail lights.

=== Safety ===
ANCAP test results Volvo S40 (2004)
Test	Score
Overall	5 /5 stars
Frontal offset	13.15/16
Side impact	16/16
Pole	2/2
Seat belt reminders	3/3
Whiplash protection	Not Assessed
Pedestrian protection	Marginal
Electronic stability control	Optional

=== S40 sales ===
Calendar year	United States	Canada	Sweden	Global
2004	19,522	1,269		
2005	24,411	2,030		
2006	24,729	1,431	3,705	72,329
2007	18,215	1,099	3,271	63,062
2008	9,686	683	2,036	48,950
2009	7,956	758	1,396	36,954
2010	5,623	818	1,182	31,688
2011	2,984	478	1,169	23,621
2012	51	0	672	12,354

Total produced: 602,910 (1995–2012)

== Successor ==
The S40 (with it siblings V50 and C30) were discontinued in 2012. The closest replacements in Volvo's lineup at the time were the V40 (introduced in 2012), along with the existing S60 and V60. With this strategy, Volvo aimed to streamline its lineup and compete more directly with manufacturers such as BMW, Audi, and Mercedes-Benz.

In 2016, Volvo presented the Concept 40.1 (SUV) and 40.2 (sedan) as previews of a future 40-series. These concepts hinted at a potential successor to the S40 and V50. Reports suggested that Volvo was considering a broader 40-series lineup, including a sedan, a wagon, a hatchback, a coupe, a convertible, an SUV, and a crossover.

Ultimately, Volvo introduced three models in the compact premium segment: the XC40/EX40, the EC40, and the Polestar 2. The XC40, launched in 2017, became Volvo's primary compact model, while the fully electric EC40 followed in 2023. Meanwhile, the Polestar 2, introduced in 2020, served as a sedan-like alternative under Volvo's performance brand, Polestar. However, a direct sedan or station wagon successor to the S40 and V50 was never produced.

== See also ==
- Volvo V50, estate variant of the second generation
- Volvo C30, three door hatchback bearing the same design as the second generation
- Volvo C70, coupé and convertible version of both the first and the second generation
- Volvo S70, mid size car bearing a similar front end design with the first generation
