= Volvo D5 engine =

Volvo D5 Engine
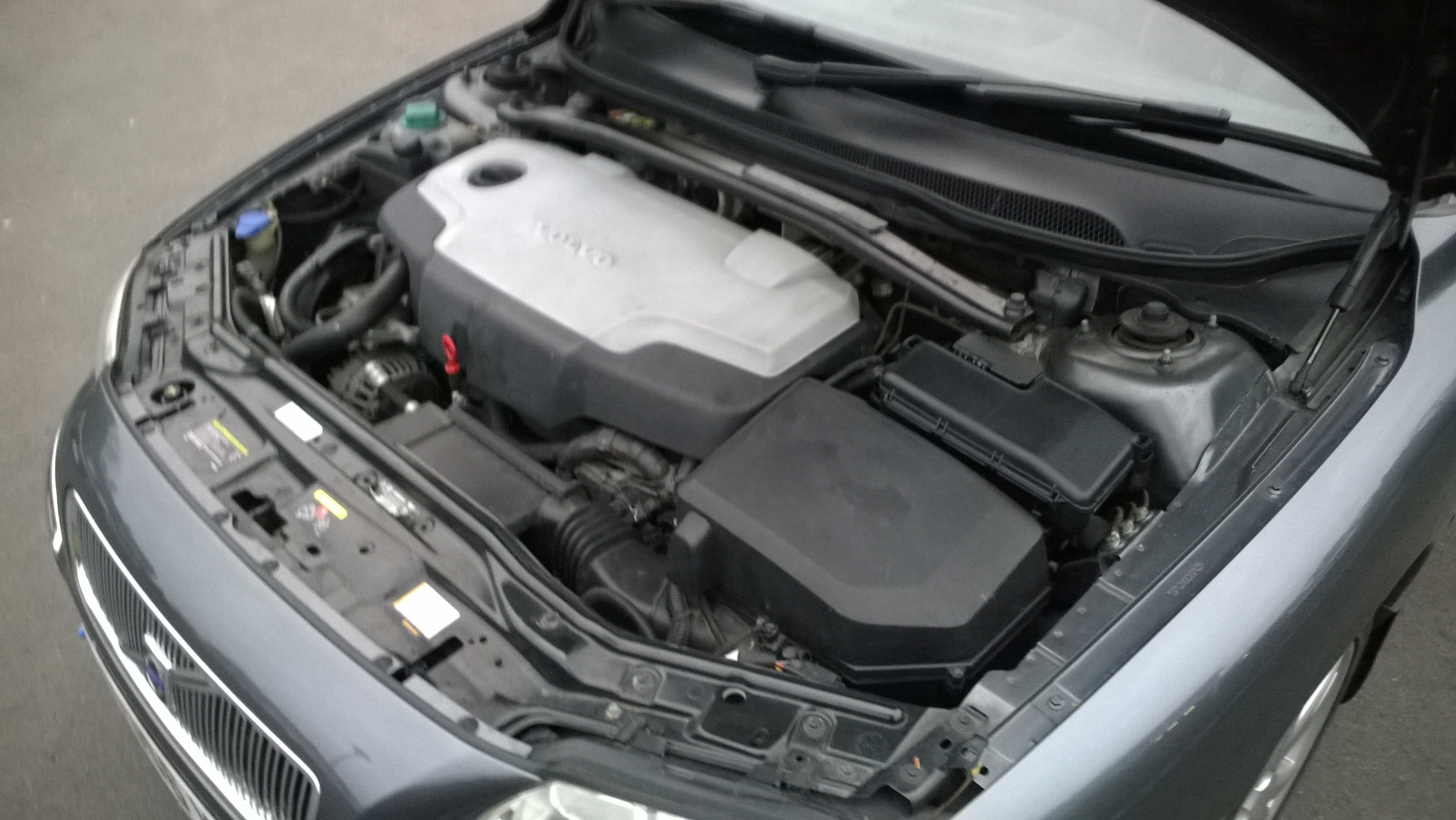
- V70 2nd generation (Euro 4) engine in a 2007 model V70

Overview
- Manufacturer: Volvo Cars
- Also called: Volvo D3; Volvo D4
- Production: 2001-2017

Layout
- Configuration: Inline-5
- Displacement: 2.0–2.4 L (1,984–2,401 cc)
- Cylinder bore: 81 mm (3.19 in)
- Piston stroke: 77–93.15 mm (3.03–3.67 in)
- Cylinder block material: Aluminium
- Cylinder head material: Aluminium
- Valvetrain: DOHC 4 valves x cyl.
- Compression ratio: 16.5:1, 17.3:1, 18.0:1

RPM range
- Max. engine speed: 5200 rpm

Combustion
- Turbocharger: Variable Nozzle Turbine or Two-stage with intercooler
- Fuel system: Common rail Direct injection
- Management: EDC15, EDC16, EDC17
- Fuel type: Diesel
- Oil system: Wet sump
- Cooling system: Water-cooled

Output
- Power output: 82–164 kW (111–223 PS; 110–220 hp)
- Torque output: 280–450 N⋅m (207–332 lb⋅ft)

Emissions
- Emissions target standard: Euro 3 - Euro 6
- Emissions control systems: Catalytic converter; Catalytic converter and EGR; Catalytic converter, EGR and DPF

Chronology
- Successor: VEA Diesel

The Volvo D5 is a type of turbocharged diesel engine developed by Volvo Cars for use in its passenger cars. The D5 engine is based on the Volvo Modular diesel engine. The D5 displaces 2.4 liters; a smaller series of two-litre engines were developed in 2010 and marketed as the Volvo D3 and D4.

== History ==
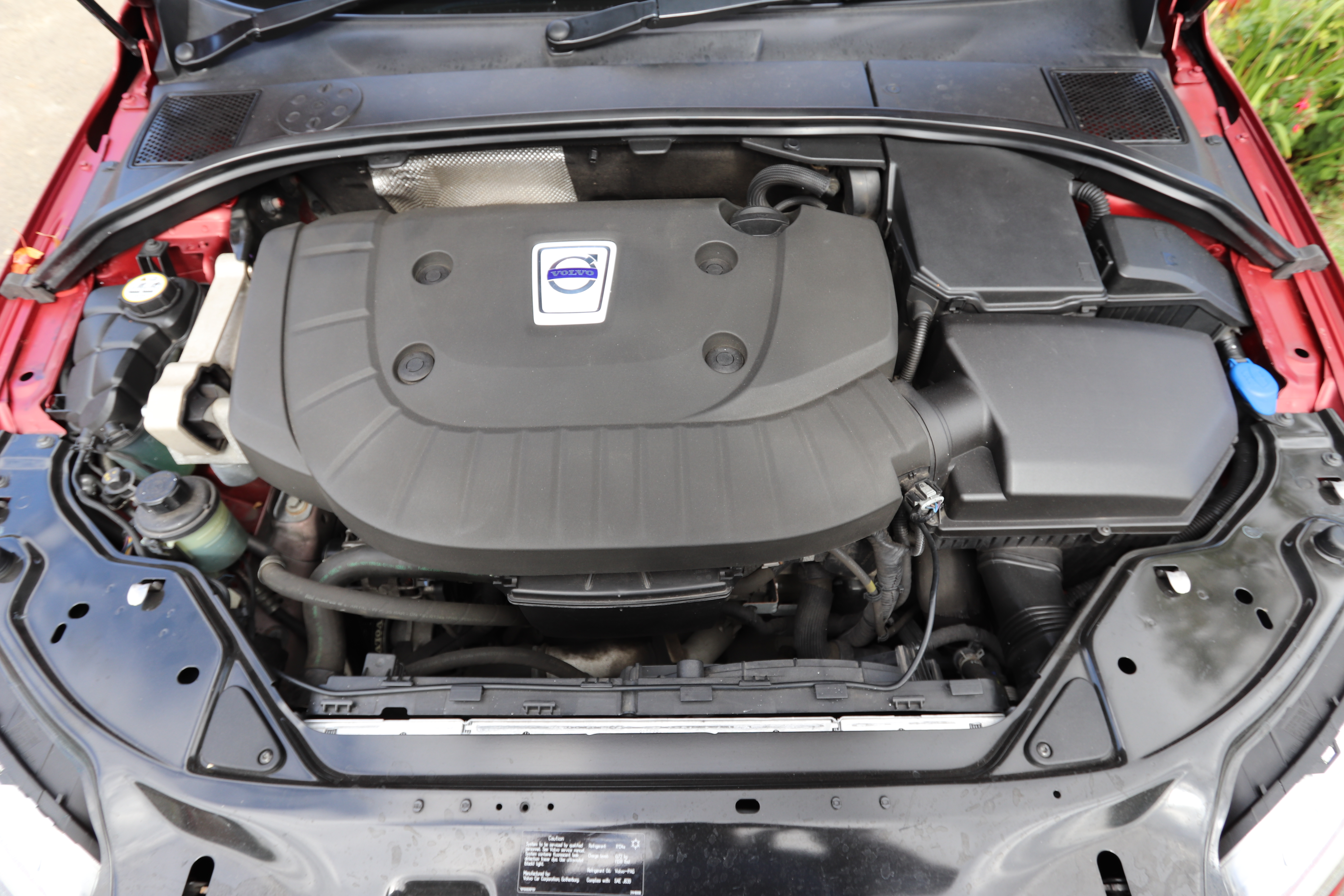
Volvo D5 engine D5244T15 (Euro 5), in 2015 model year Volvo XC70

It is an all-aluminium five-cylinder engine with 20 valves and double overhead camshafts. In all but one late version it has a VGT turbocharger of the type VNT (variable nozzle turbine), common rail direct injection and cooled exhaust gas recirculation (EGR).

There are three generations of D5 engines:

- The first generation was introduced in 2001.
- The second generation was introduced in 2005. The second generation got a slight reduction in stroke and has a reduced compression ratio, a water-cooled VNT turbocharger with a bigger compressor and an electric servo motor to adjust the vanes, an improved EGR system, a throttle valve, revised intake and exhaust ports and a newer generation of common-rail direct injection with improved injectors.
- The third generation was introduced in 2009. The third generation got a further reduction in compression ratio, a two-stage turbo system (D5244T10), an improved exhaust gas recirculation (EGR) system, revised intake and exhaust ports and a newer generation of common-rail direct injection with higher pressure and piezoelectric injectors.

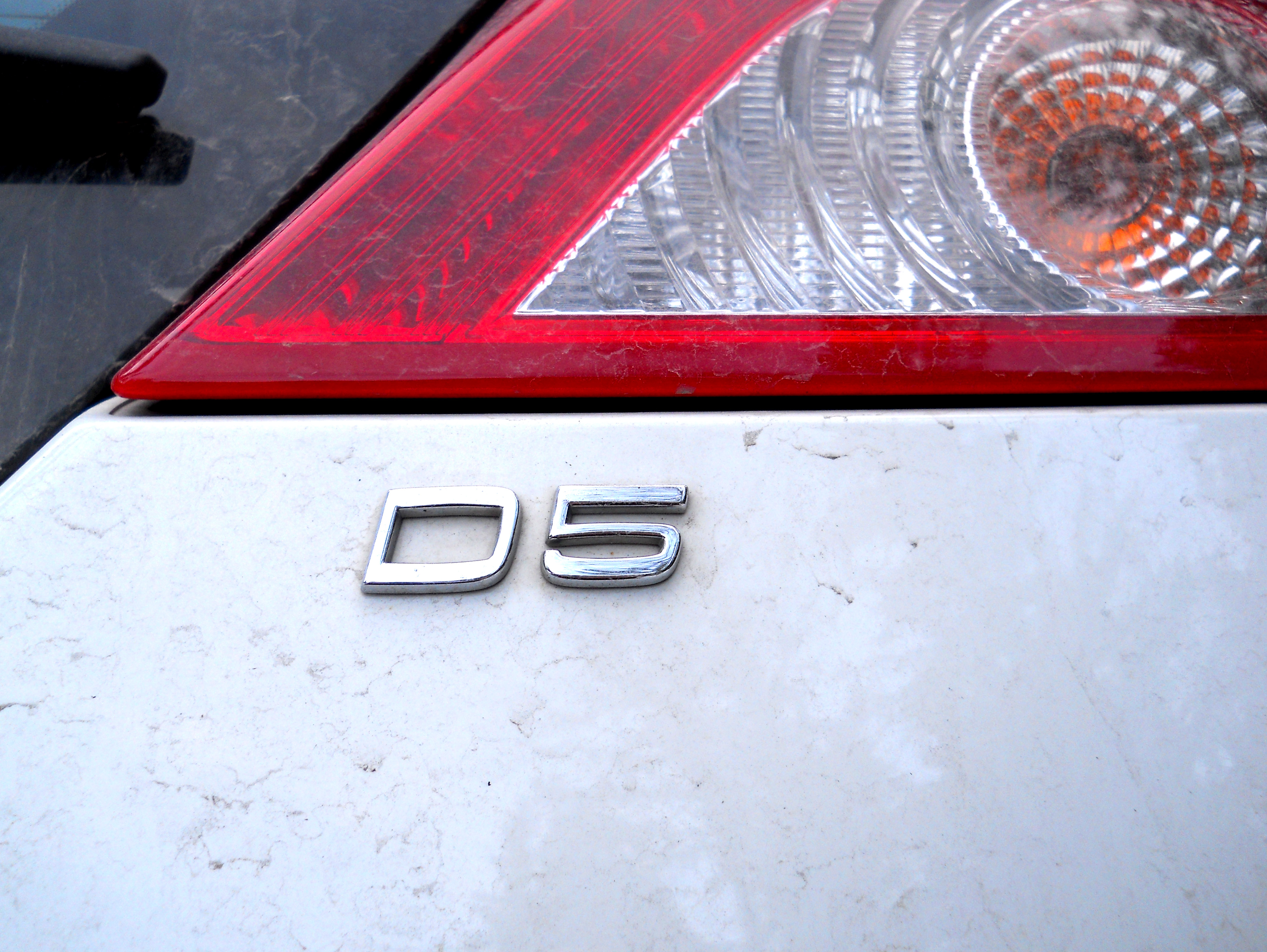
D5 emblem on a 2008 Volvo C30

Volvo has a special version of the D5 (D5244T8/T13) for use in the C30, S40, V50 and C70 models that produces 180 PS (132 kW) and 400 N⋅m (295 lb⋅ft) of torque, reduced to 350 N⋅m (258 lb⋅ft) with automatic transmission. The engine compartments of these cars are smaller so among other things the engine has a different air intake system, different exhaust system, smaller charge air cooler and a smaller radiator.

The only examples of the 2400cc engine to meet the Euro 6 emission standard are in the 2016 model year version of the Volvo XC70 AWD D5 auto and in the 2015 D5 AWD and 2016 D6 AWD "Twin Engine" models of the Volvo V60 plug-in electric hybrid (PHEV) vehicle, badged as D87PHEV and D97PHEV engines respectively.

In 2009 Volvo, in conjunction with Polestar, launched software upgrades for many of its D5 engines. These upgrades have no impact on official emission or fuel consumption figures, but produce power and torque gains of typically a little over 10%. The first engine to have such an upgrade available was the D5244T4, and the upgrade increased the torque from 400 to 450 N⋅m (295 to 332 lb⋅ft), and power from 185 to 205 PS (136 to 151 kW). The same upgrade was available for the mechanically-identical D5244T5. Similar upgrades have since been launched for later engines.

== Marine engine ==
The D5244T is also offered as a marine engine by Volvo Penta under the name D3. The marinised engine is in large parts identical to D5244T. This includes crankshaft, pistons, camshafts, valves, cylinder block, cylinder head, turbo, injectors and the high pressure pump. The D3 ECU has a modified software, which e.g. gives a modified torque suited for marine applications and has a simplified starting sequence. The hardware differences between D5244T and D3 are: a water-cooled intercooler, a water-cooled exhaust manifold, a heavier monolithic crankwheel, a seawater-pump and a heat exchanger. The output is 110 hp (82 kW) at 3,000 rpm, 130 hp (97 kW), 160 hp (119 kW), 190 hp (142 kW), 220 hp (164 kW) at 4,000 rpm and it is coupled to a duoprop I/O system.

== Models ==
Engine code	Max. power	Max. torque	Max. engine speed	Bore x Stroke	Displacement	Compression ratio	Turbocharging system	Common rail
D5244T	163 PS (120 kW) at 4,000 rpm	340 N⋅m (251 lb⋅ft) at 1,750-2,750 rpm	4,600 rpm	81 mm × 93.2 mm (3.19 in × 3.67 in)	2,401 cc (146.5 cu in)	18.0:1	VNT	Second generation 1,600 bar (23,000 psi)
D5244T2	130 PS (96 kW) at 4,000 rpm	280 N⋅m (207 lb⋅ft) at 1,750-3,000 rpm	4,600 rpm	81 mm × 93.2 mm (3.19 in × 3.67 in)	2,401 cc (146.5 cu in)	18.0:1	VNT	Second generation 1,600 bar (23,000 psi)
D5244T3	116 PS (85 kW) at 4,000 rpm	280 N⋅m (207 lb⋅ft) at 1,750-3,000 rpm	4,600 rpm	81 mm × 93.2 mm (3.19 in × 3.67 in)	2,401 cc (146.5 cu in)	18.0:1	VNT	Second generation 1,600 bar (23,000 psi)
D5244T4	185 PS (136 kW) at 4,000 rpm	400 N⋅m (295 lb⋅ft) at 2,000-2,750 rpm	5,000 rpm	81 mm × 93.15 mm (3.19 in × 3.67 in)	2,400 cc (146.5 cu in)	17.3:1	VNT	Second generation 1,600 bar (23,000 psi)
D5244T5	163 PS (120 kW) at 4,000 rpm	340 N⋅m (251 lb⋅ft) at 1,750-2,250 rpm	5,000 rpm	81 mm × 93.15 mm (3.19 in × 3.67 in)	2,400 cc (146.5 cu in)	17.3:1	VNT	Second generation 1,600 bar (23,000 psi)
D5244T7	126 PS (93 kW) at 4,000 rpm	300 N⋅m (221 lb⋅ft) at 1,750-2,750 rpm	5,000 rpm	81 mm × 93.15 mm (3.19 in × 3.67 in)	2,400 cc (146.5 cu in)	17.3:1	VNT	Second generation 1,600 bar (23,000 psi)
D5244T8	180 PS (132 kW) at 4,000 rpm	350 N⋅m (258 lb⋅ft) at 1,750-3,250 rpm	4,600 rpm	81 mm × 93.15 mm (3.19 in × 3.67 in)	2,400 cc (146.5 cu in)	17.3:1	VNT	Second generation 1,600 bar (23,000 psi)
D5244T13	180 PS (132 kW) at 4,000 rpm	400 N⋅m (295 lb⋅ft) at 2,000-2,750 rpm	4,600 rpm	81 mm × 93.15 mm (3.19 in × 3.67 in)	2,400 cc (146.5 cu in)	17.3:1	VNT	Second generation 1,600 bar (23,000 psi)
D5244T18	200 PS (147 kW) at 3,900 rpm	420 N⋅m (310 lb⋅ft) at 1,900-2,800 rpm	5,000 rpm	81 mm × 93.15 mm (3.19 in × 3.67 in)	2,400 cc (146.5 cu in)	17.3:1	VNT	Second generation 1,600 bar (23,000 psi)
D5244T10	205 PS (151 kW) at 4,000 rpm	420 N⋅m (310 lb⋅ft) at 1,500-3,250 rpm	5,200 rpm	81 mm × 93.15 mm (3.19 in × 3.67 in)	2,400 cc (146.5 cu in)	16.5:1	Two-stage	Third generation 1,800 bar (26,000 psi)
D5244T11	215 PS (158 kW) at 4,000 rpm	420 N⋅m (310 lb⋅ft) at 1,500-3,250 rpm	5,200 rpm	81 mm × 93.15 mm (3.19 in × 3.67 in)	2,400 cc (146.5 cu in)	16.5:1	Two-stage	Third generation 1,800 bar (26,000 psi)
D5244T14	175 PS (129 kW) at 3,000-4,000 rpm	420 N⋅m (310 lb⋅ft) at 1,500-2,750 rpm	5,000 rpm	81 mm × 93.15 mm (3.19 in × 3.67 in)	2,400 cc (146.5 cu in)	16.5:1	VNT	Third generation 1,800 bar (26,000 psi)
D5244T15	215 PS (158 kW) at 4,000 rpm	440 N⋅m (325 lb⋅ft) at 1,500-3,000 rpm	5,200 rpm	81 mm × 93.15 mm (3.19 in × 3.67 in)	2,400 cc (146.5 cu in)	16.5:1	Two-stage	Third generation 1,800 bar (26,000 psi)
D5244T16/T17	163 PS (120 kW) at 4,000 rpm	420 N⋅m (310 lb⋅ft) at 1,500-2,500 rpm	5,000 rpm	81 mm × 93.15 mm (3.19 in × 3.67 in)	2,400 cc (146.5 cu in)	16.5:1	Two-stage	Third generation 1,800 bar (26,000 psi)
D5244T20	220 PS (162 kW) at 4,000 rpm	440 N⋅m (325 lb⋅ft) at 1,500-2,500 rpm	5,200 rpm	81 mm × 93.15 mm (3.19 in × 3.67 in)	2,400 cc (146.5 cu in)	16.5:1	Two-stage	Third generation 1,800 bar (26,000 psi)
D5244T21	190 PS (140 kW) at 4,000 rpm	420 N⋅m (310 lb⋅ft) at 1,500-3,000 rpm	5,200 rpm	81 mm × 93.15 mm (3.19 in × 3.67 in)	2,400 cc (146.5 cu in)	16.5:1	Two-stage	Third generation 1,800 bar (26,000 psi)
D5244T22	220 PS (162 kW) at 4,000 rpm	420 N⋅m (310 lb⋅ft) at 1,500-3,000 rpm	5,200 rpm	81 mm × 93.15 mm (3.19 in × 3.67 in)	2,400 cc (146.5 cu in)	16.5:1	Two-stage	Third generation 1,800 bar (26,000 psi)

Note: 'D5' is branding. All these engines share the five-cylinder block, although not all consistently used the 'D5' badge over time. This is due to changes in hardware and the specific model the engine was deployed in. E.g. On the S60 -05 range, the D5244T was labelled 'D5', and subsequently the D5244T5 was labelled '2.4D' as a (software) detuned version of the D5244T4 'D5' on the 05-09 range. The D5244T21 was even badged 'D4' when used in the S60 D4 AWD automatic between 2016 and 2018. Similarly the 2016 XC60 AWD branded the 190PS D5244T21 as 'D4', but the 220PS D5244T20 as 'D5', whilst the two wheel drive XC60 model of the same year used 'D4' to describe the different D4204T four-cylinder diesel engine developed in conjunction with Ford and PSA.

== Volvo D3 and D4 (trim level) ==
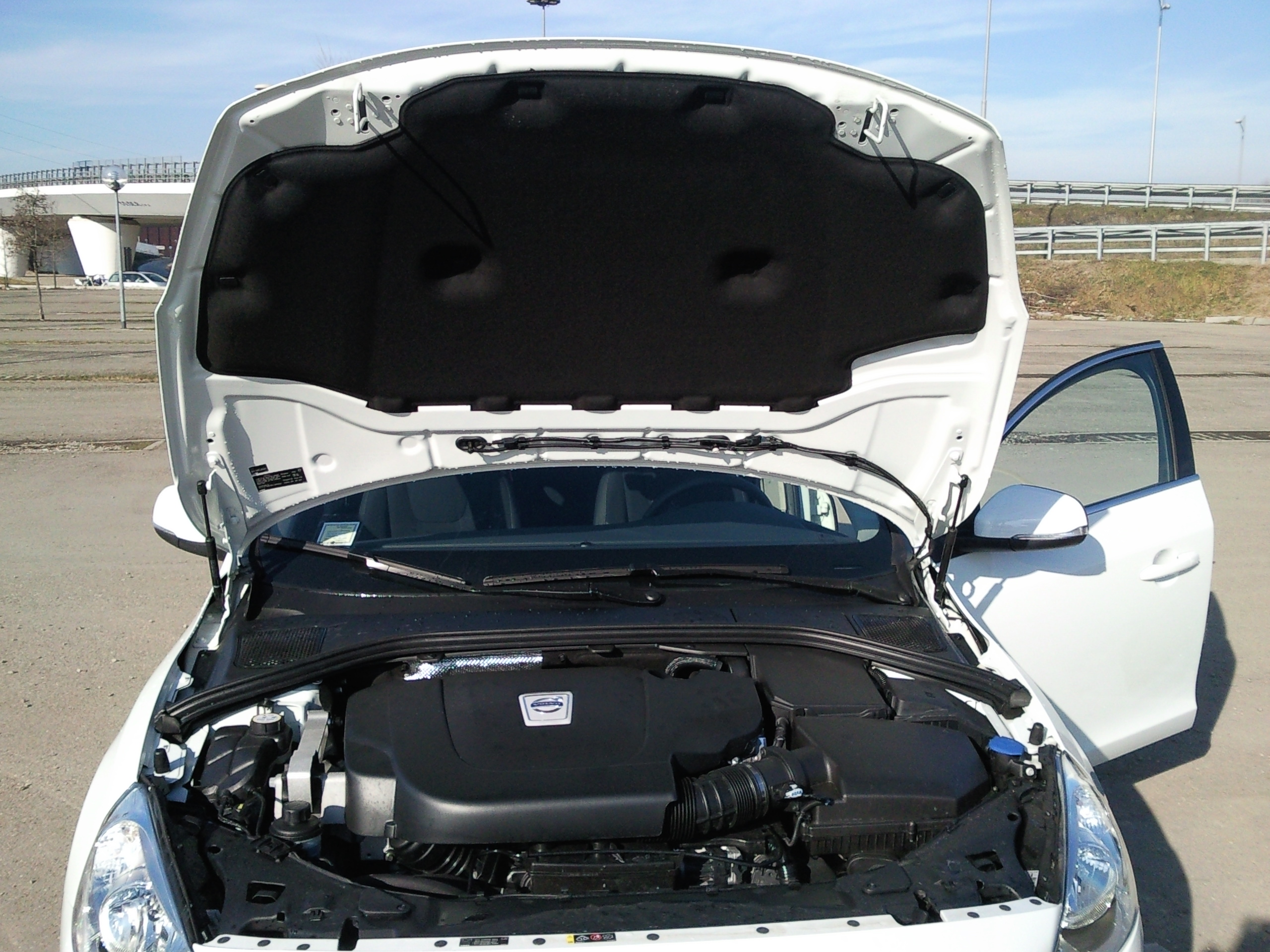
First generation Volvo D3 engine

In 2010 Volvo debuted a new series of two-liter engines based on the third generation D5 with all the features of that engine. Three models with different power outputs were available (internal model codes D5204T, D5204T2, and D5204T5), marketed as the D3 and D4 depending on output. The direct injection pump is a Bosch CP4 with two heads, helping to produce torque of around 400 N⋅m (300 lb⋅ft) even at low engine speeds.

The D3/D4 bore remains the same as in the D5, but with a 77 mm (3.0 in) stroke the displacement is brought down to 1,984 cc (121.1 cu in), keeping it below the vital two-litre threshold in many countries. The D3 is the lower-powered series, with the higher output D5204T referred to as the D4.

In April 2011 the original D5204T2 was replaced by the upgraded D3 version, which featured Volvo's "Volvo Environment Diesel" (VED) technologies to lower emissions and consumption. Power and torque figures remained largely unchanged. In April 2012 a lower tuned engine, the 136 PS (100 kW) D5204T7 was announced; it was marketed as a "D3" and meanwhile the 163 PS (120 kW) version changed its name to "D4".

=== Specifications ===
	D5204T	D5204T2	D5204T3	D5204T4	D5204T5	D5204T6	D5204T7
Max power	177 PS (130 kW) at 3,500 rpm	163 PS (120 kW) at 2,900 rpm	163 PS (120 kW) at 3,500 rpm	177 PS (130 kW) at 3,500 rpm	150 PS (110 kW) at 3,500 rpm	150 PS (110 kW) at 3,500 rpm	136 PS (100 kW) at 3,500 rpm
Max torque	400 N⋅m (295 lb⋅ft) at 1,750-2,750 rpm	400 N⋅m (295 lb⋅ft) at 1,400-2,850 rpm	400 N⋅m (295 lb⋅ft) at 1,500-2,750 rpm	400 N⋅m (295 lb⋅ft) at 1,750-2,750 rpm	350 N⋅m (258 lb⋅ft) at 1,500-2,750 rpm	350 N⋅m (258 lb⋅ft) at 1,500-2,750 rpm	350 N⋅m (258 lb⋅ft) at 1,500-2,250 rpm
Max engine speed	5,000 rpm	4,400 rpm	5,000 rpm	5,000 rpm	5,000 rpm	5,000 rpm	5,000 rpm
Bore x Stroke	81 mm × 77 mm (3.19 in × 3.03 in)						
Displacement	2.0 L (1,984 cc)						
Compression ratio	16.5:1						
Charging system	Variable Nozzle Turbine						
Common rail	Third generation 1,800 bar (26,000 psi)						

== Successor ==
In autumn of 2013 the new Volvo Engine Architecture was introduced. The 5-cylinder D5 began a process of being gradually phased out along with the V70/XC70 and first generation XC60. Production of the D5 type engines ended in 2017.
