= Volvo Car Gent =

Automobile factory in Ghent, Belgium

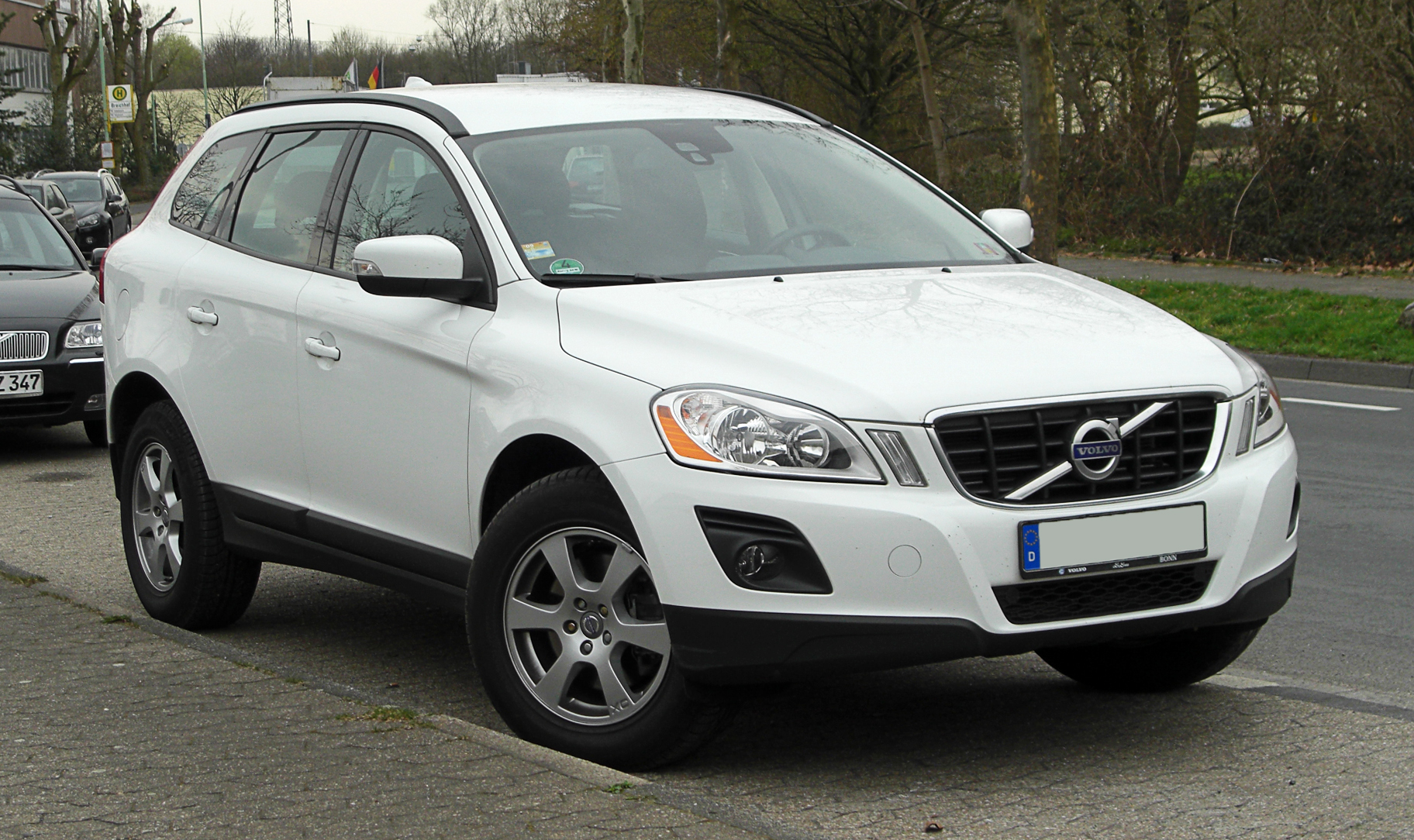
Volvo XC60: Volvo Gent's top seller in 2011

Volvo Car Gent (until 2007 known as Volvo Cars Europe Industry N.V.) is an automobile manufacturer located in the Port of Ghent in western Belgium. By about 2013 the Ghent plant had become the Volvo plant manufacturing most cars. The company is a wholly owned subsidiary of the Swedish automaker Volvo Cars. It is owned by Volvo Car Belgium NV. Its activities comprise welding, painting and final assembly. The plant became the only car manufacturing plant in Flanders after Ford Genk closed at the end of 2014.

The plant opened in 1965. It was the first European Volvo plant outside Sweden. The Ghent location was chosen because it was centrally positioned within the EEC and was supported by a good transport infrastructure.

The first Volvo produced in Ghent was the company’s 120 Series (120/121/122, later 130), also known as Amazon. In September 2012 the plant was producing the Volvo C30, Volvo V40, Volvo S60 and Volvo XC60 models, of which the XC60 was the top seller, thanks in part to tax advantages available in certain key markets for the DRIVe version. In 2011 the company was hoping to match the 258,000 units of output achieved in 2005, the plant’s top production year till that point.

In 2015 the Ghent plant employed about 5,400 people. Volvo Car Gent produced 252,479 cars (XC60, V40 and S60) in 2015. In 2017 Volvo Car Gent started to produce the first new vehicle on the CMA platform (Compact Modular Architecture), the Volvo XC40.

In 2020, the Ghent plant began to produce Volvo's first mass-market electric car, the XC40 Recharge. In 2021, the electric-only C40 began production at Gent.

The city of Ghent is also home to a Volvo truck plant. This plant is part of Volvo Group Belgium and, apart from the Volvo brand name, is no longer linked to the car activities in Belgium. This plant was formerly known as Volvo Europa Truck.

In November 2016 the 6th million car was produced.

== Production ==
=== Current ===
Model	Production years
Volvo XC40	2017–
Volvo EX30	2025-
Volvo EC40	2021-
Volvo V60	2018-

=== Historical ===
Model	Production years	Production figures
Volvo S60/XC60	2009–2018	
Volvo S40	2004–2012	
Volvo C30	2006–2013	
Volvo V40	2012–2019	
Volvo S60/V70	2000–2009	929,209 S60: 578,292
Volvo 850/S70/V70	1991–2000	1,110,541
Volvo 740/760 Series	1983–1992	617,089
Volvo 260/240 Series	1974–84	428,371
Volvo 144	1968–1974	205,513
Volvo 120/130 Series	1965–1969	26,307
