= Volvo V40 (2012–2019) =

Swedish compact hatchback

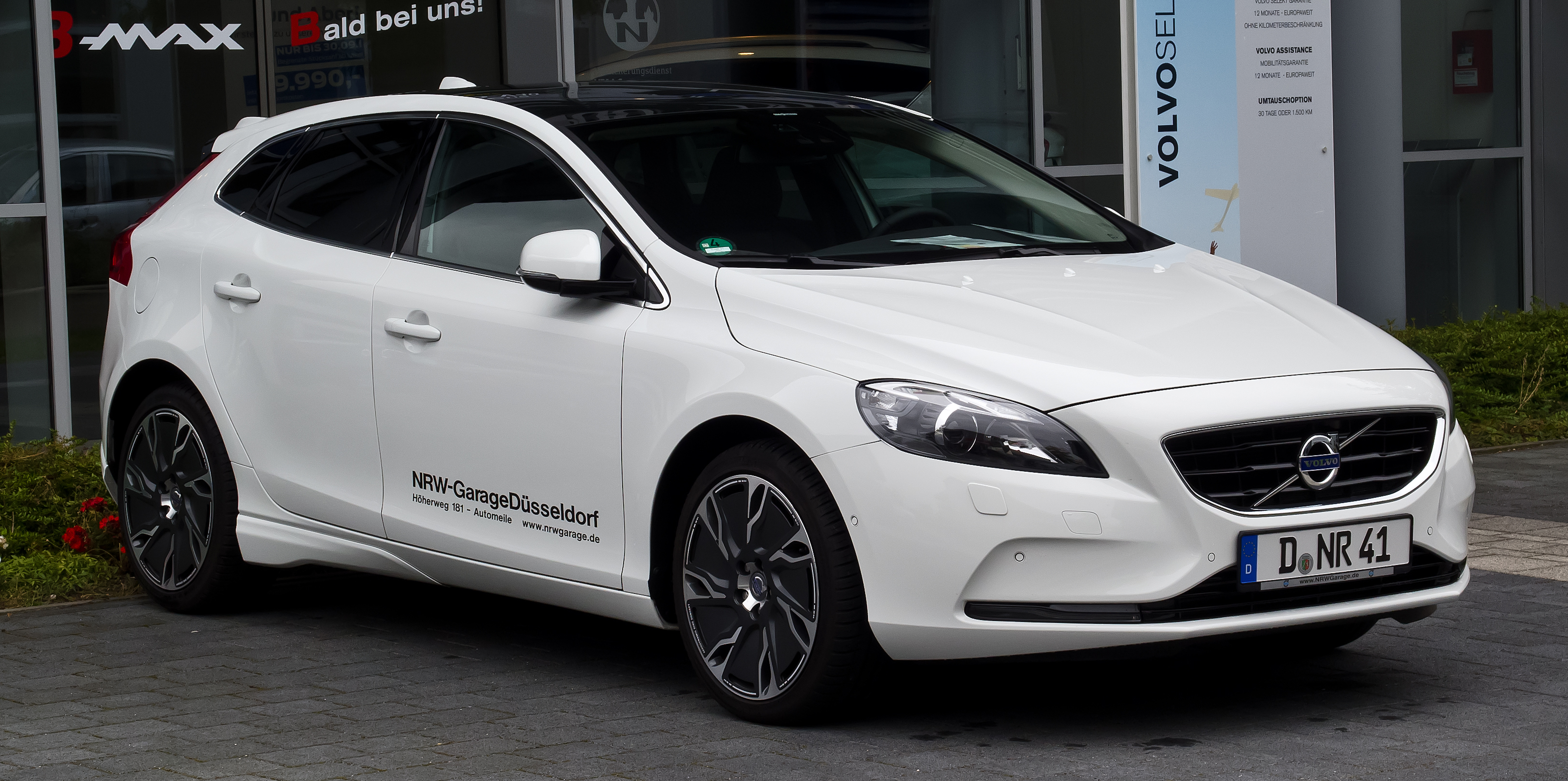
- V40 D3 equipped with the Designpaket (Design Package) (Germany; pre-facelift)

Overview
- Manufacturer: Volvo Cars
- Production: 2012–2019
- Model years: 2013–2019
- Assembly: Belgium: Ghent (VCG); Malaysia: Shah Alam (VCMM)
- Designer: Peter Horbury; Chris Benjamin; Pontus Fontaeus

Body and chassis
- Class: Compact car / Subcompact executive car (C)
- Body style: 5-door hatchback
- Layout: Front-engine, front-wheel-drive
- Platform: Volvo P1

Powertrain
- Engine: Petrol: 2012–2015; T2, T3, T4 1.6 L EcoBoost I4; T4 2.0 L B5204T9, T5 2.5 L B5254T12/T14 I5; 2015–2019; T2, T3 Drive-E 1.5L VEP4 I4; T2, T3, T4, T5 Drive-E 2.0 L VEP4 I4; Diesel: 2012–2015; D2 1.6 L PSA DV6 I4; D3, D4 2.0 L Volvo D5 I5; 2015–2019; D2, D3, D4 Drive-E 2.0 L VED4 I4
- Transmission: 6-speed Getrag B6 manual; 6-speed Volvo M66 manual; 6-speed Powershift; 6-speed Aisin TF-80SD automatic; 6-speed Aisin TF-71SC automatic; 8-speed Aisin TG-81SC automatic

Dimensions
- Wheelbase: 2,647 mm (104.2 in)
- Length: 4,369 mm (172.0 in)
- Width: 1,802 mm (70.9 in)}}
- Height: 1,445 mm (56.9 in)
- Curb weight: 1,357–1,498 kg (2,992–3,303 lb)

Chronology
- Predecessor: Volvo C30; Volvo S40; Volvo V50

The Volvo V40 is a small family car (C-segment in Europe) manufactured and marketed by Volvo Cars from 2012 to 2019. It was unveiled at the 2012 Geneva Motor Show, and was on sale in Europe between 2012 and 2019.

== Models ==
=== V40 ===
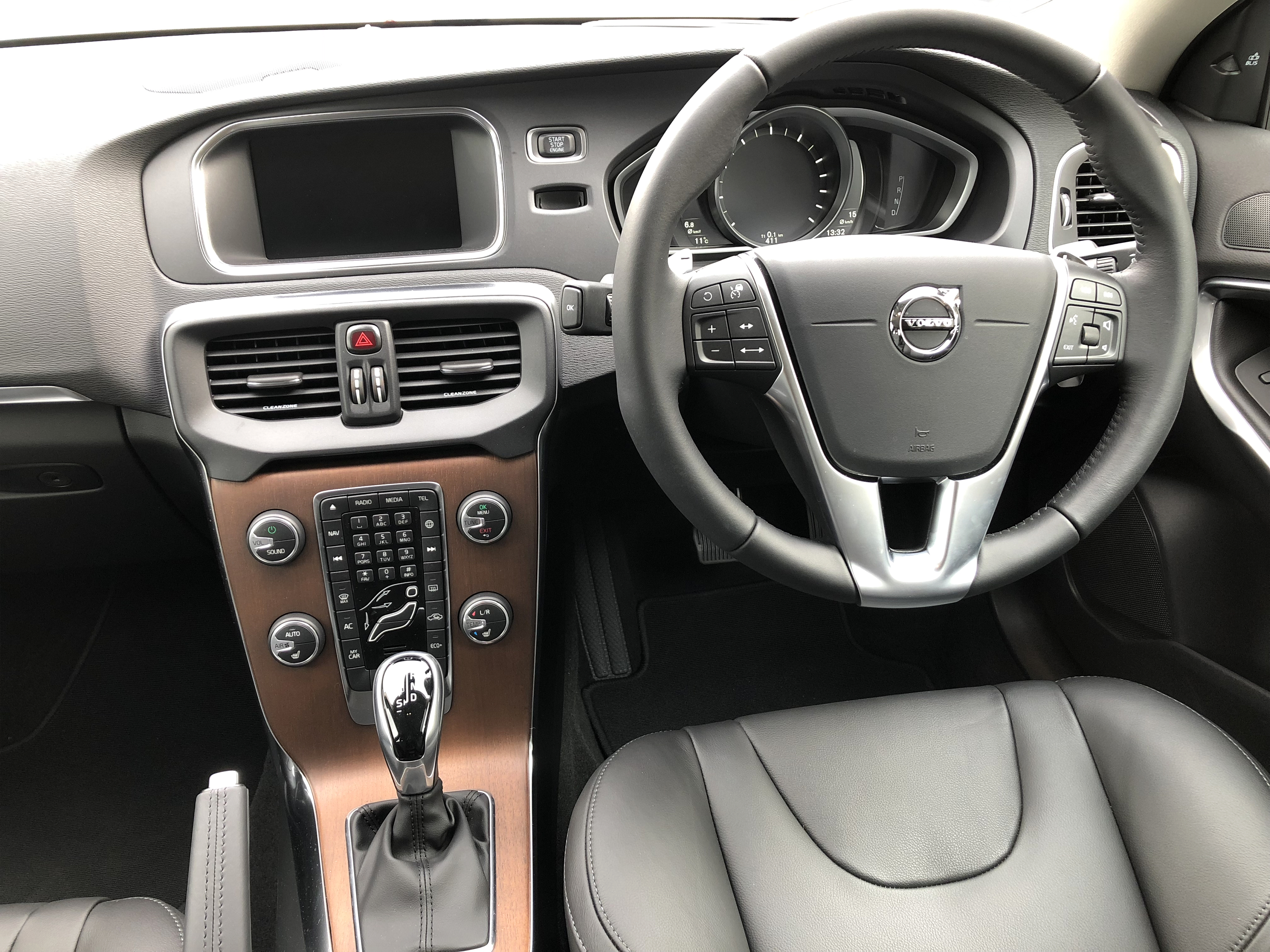
Interior

The V40 was designed by American Chris Benjamin, the interior is the work of Pontus Fontaeus, and was the last Volvo to be designed under Steve Mattin, before he departed the company. It is built on the Global C platform with modifications to the electric power steering, and revised spring and damper settings.

The engine lineup at launch were: two petrol engines; a 1.6 litre EcoBoost I4 producing either 150 or 180 hp, dependent on specification, and a 2.5 litre Volvo B525 I5 producing 254 hp, and two diesel engines; a 1.6 litre PSA Peugeot Citroën / Ford Duratorq engine, which produces 115 hp, whilst only emitting 94 g/km of CO_{2}, and a 2.0 litre I5 Volvo diesel engine available in two versions, 150 hp and 177 hp. In some countries, the V40 T5 uses a 2.0 litre I5 (B5204T9) producing 213 hp @ 6000 rpm and 300 nm from 2,700 to 5,000 rpm.

From model year 2014, Volvo began fitting its in-house developed Drive E (VEA) diesel and petrol engines to the V40. As of January 2015, these engines are available in the new V40 D4 (replacing the previous five cylinder D4) and V40 T5 (replacing the petrol five cylinder T5). Also available is the IntelliSafe safety precrash system.

Available in both the V40 and V40 Cross Country bodies, the D4 Drive E includes a four-cylinder twin turbo diesel engine rated 190 PS (140 kW; 187 hp) and 400 N⋅m (295 lb⋅ft), a six speed manual transmission tuned for improved fuel economy, pressure feedback from each fuel injector, reduced friction, and a smart valve solution on the cooling system for a more rapid heat up phase after a cold start.

The T5 Drive-E includes a four-cylinder turbo petrol engine rated 243 PS (179 kW; 240 hp) and 350 N⋅m (258 lb⋅ft), with eight speed automatic transmission.

These new engines replace the older, but identically branded, five cylinder engines. After introduction of the VEA D4 and T5, the 1.6 D2 and 2.0 five cylinder D3 are replaced with VEA 2.0 D2 and D3 engines. The 1.6 EcoBoost and 2.0 five cylinder are replaced with VEA 2.0 T2, T3, and T4 engines. For some petrol automatic models, a de stroked version of the VEA 2.0, with 1.5 litre displacement, is used for T2 and T3.

=== Pre-facelift ===
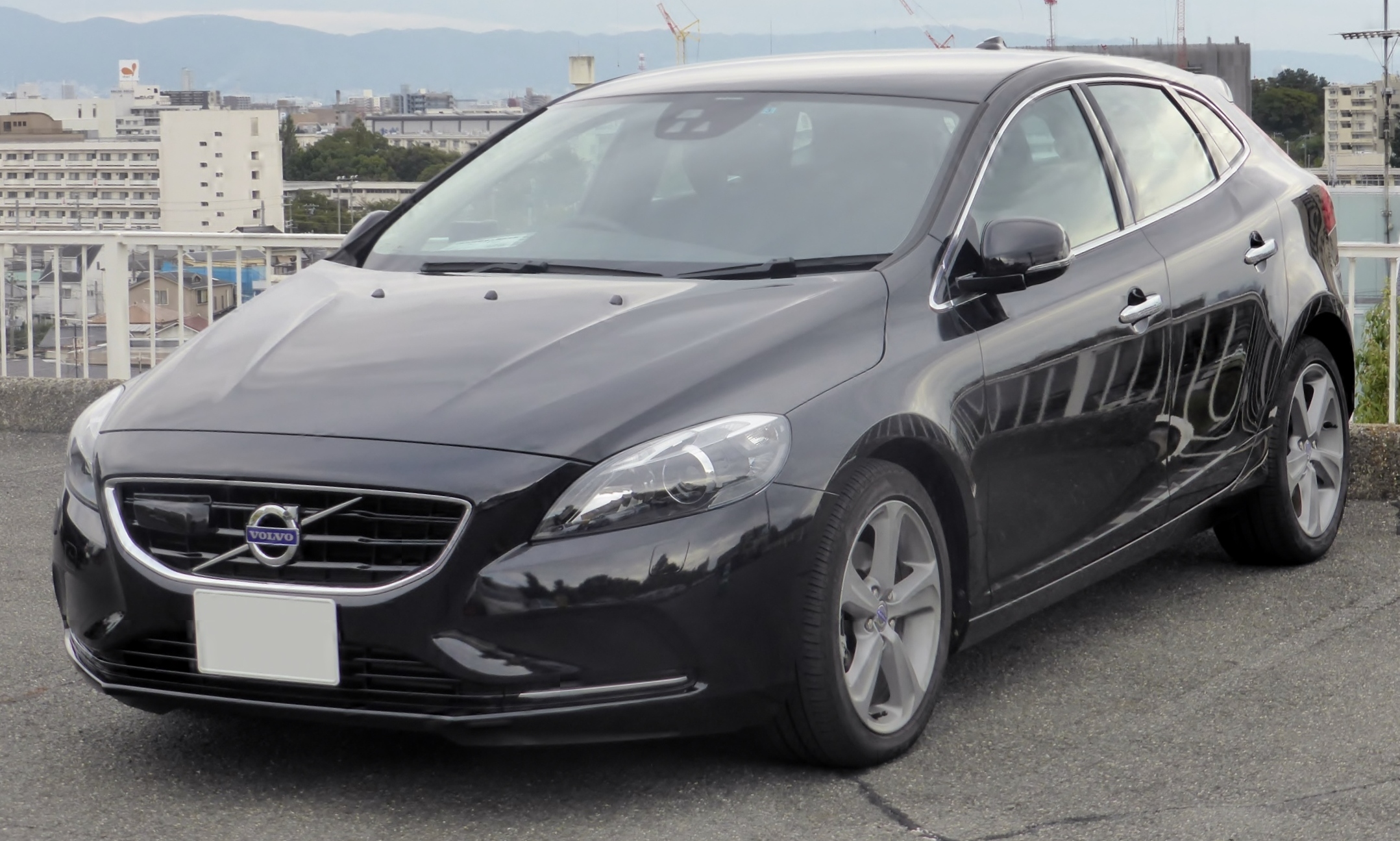
Pre-facelift

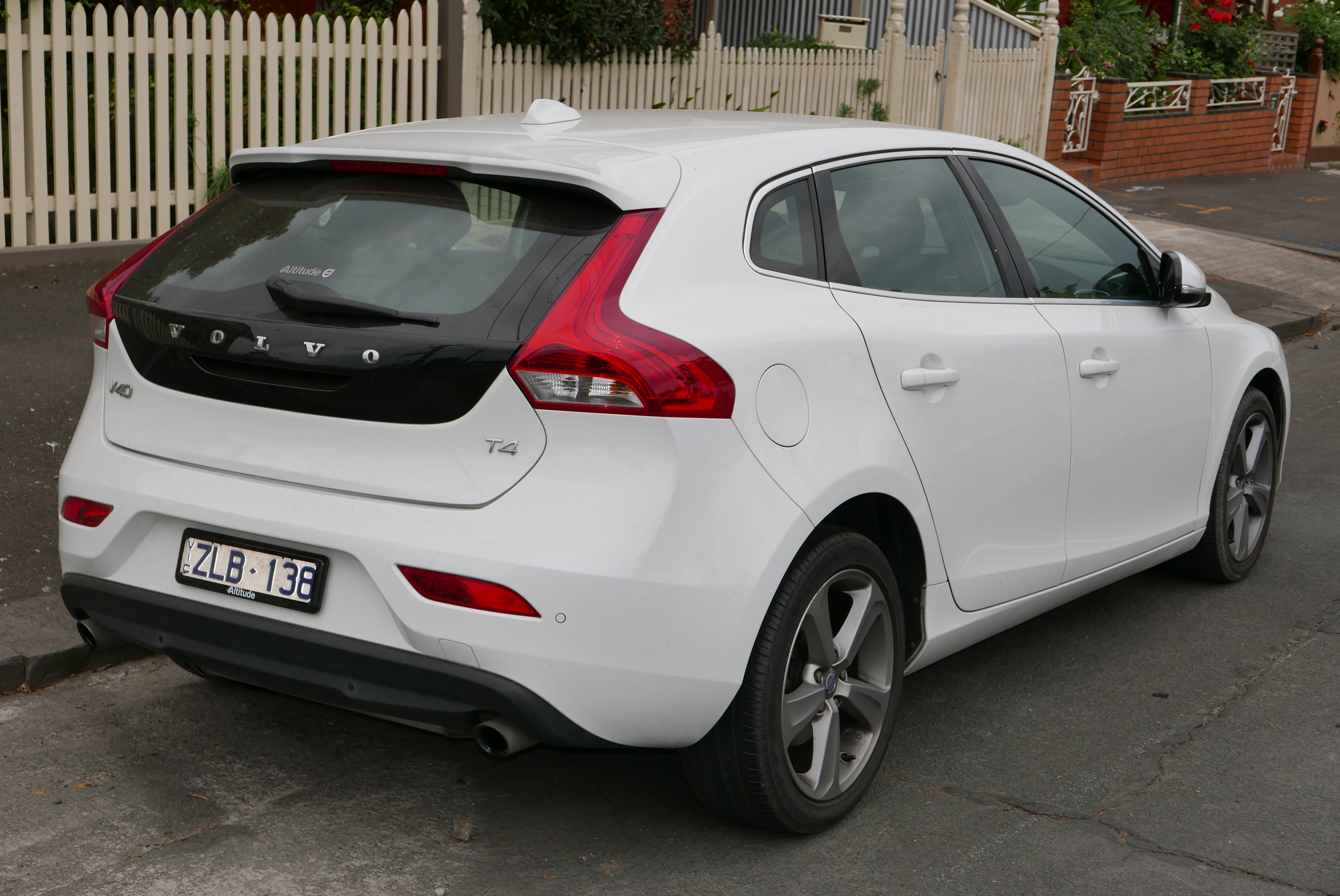
Pre-facelift

=== 2016 facelift ===
A facelifted V40 made an appearance. This new version of the V40 includes the Thor's hammer headlights on all variants of V40, as featured on the XC90 II, S90 II and V90 II. Also added the option for straw patterns on the interior seats.

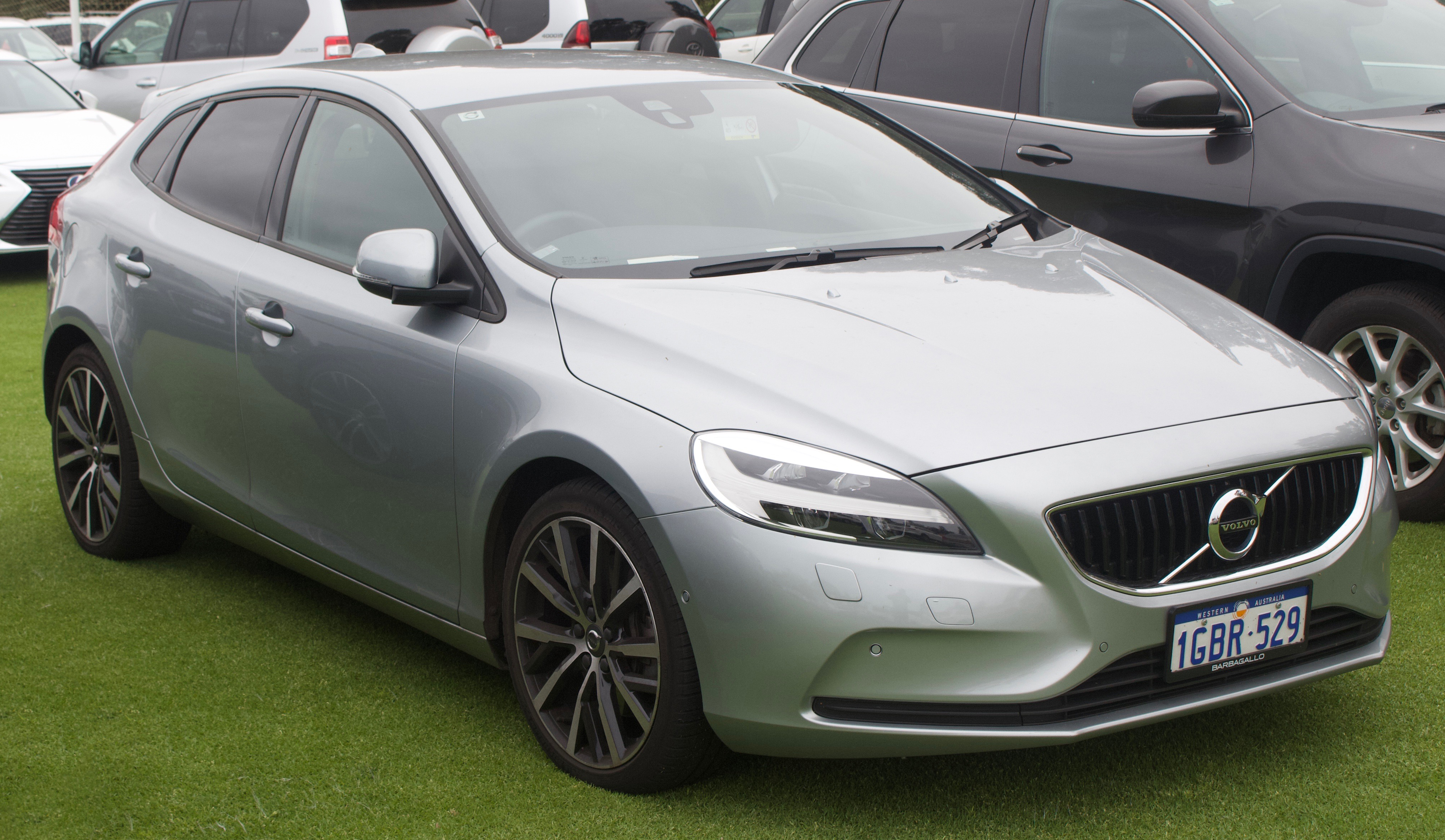
Facelift Volvo V40 T3 Momentum (AU)

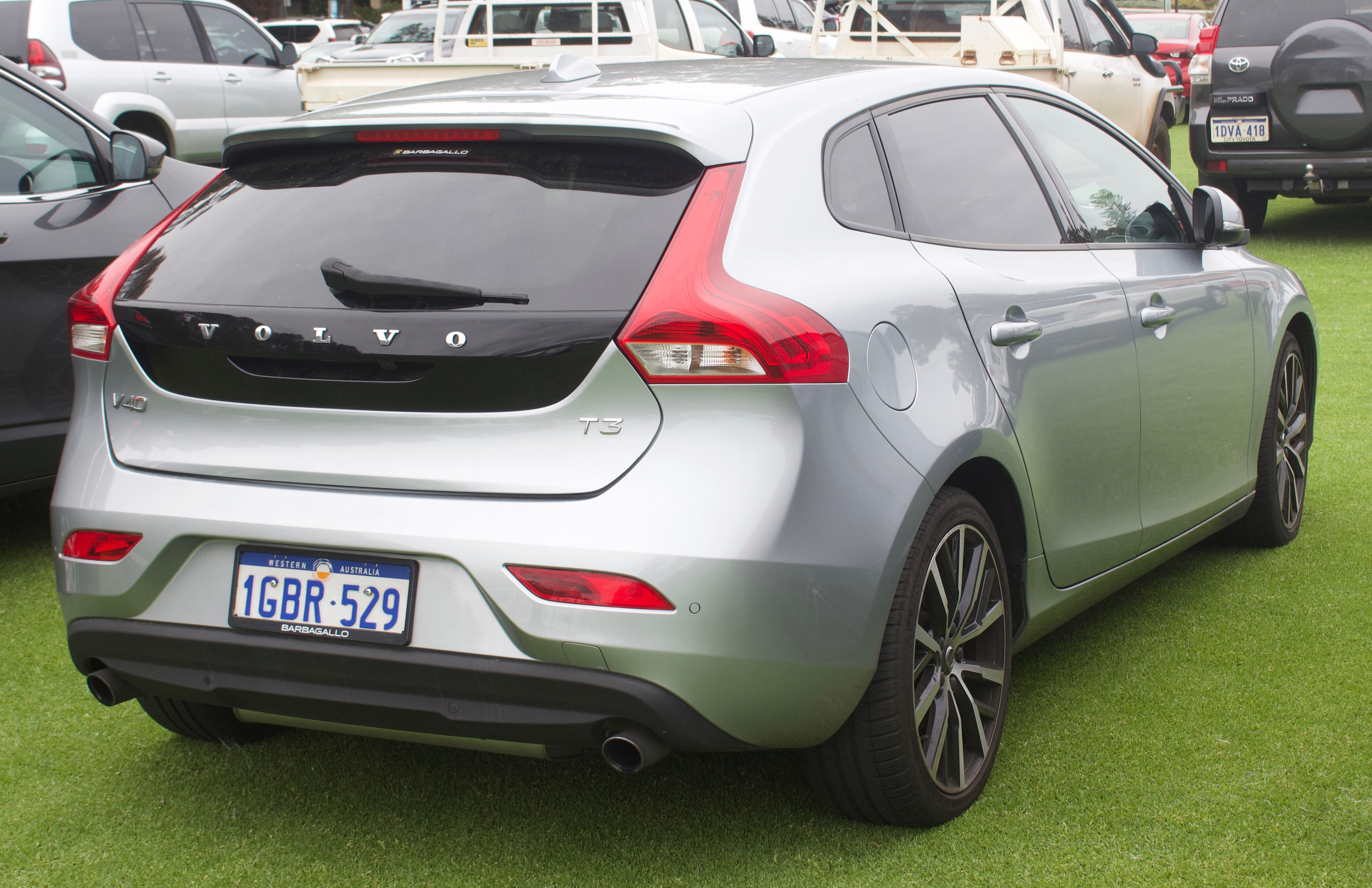
Facelift Volvo V40 T3 Momentum (AU)

== Volvo V40 Cross Country (2013–2019) ==
The Cross Country is a version of the Volvo V40 with protective body panels, bigger wheels and tyres along with an increased ride height. Its T4 and T5 petrol variants feature Haldex Gen-5 All Wheel Drive as an option, along with hill descent control. The V40 Cross Country is equipped with more powerful engines than the regular V40.

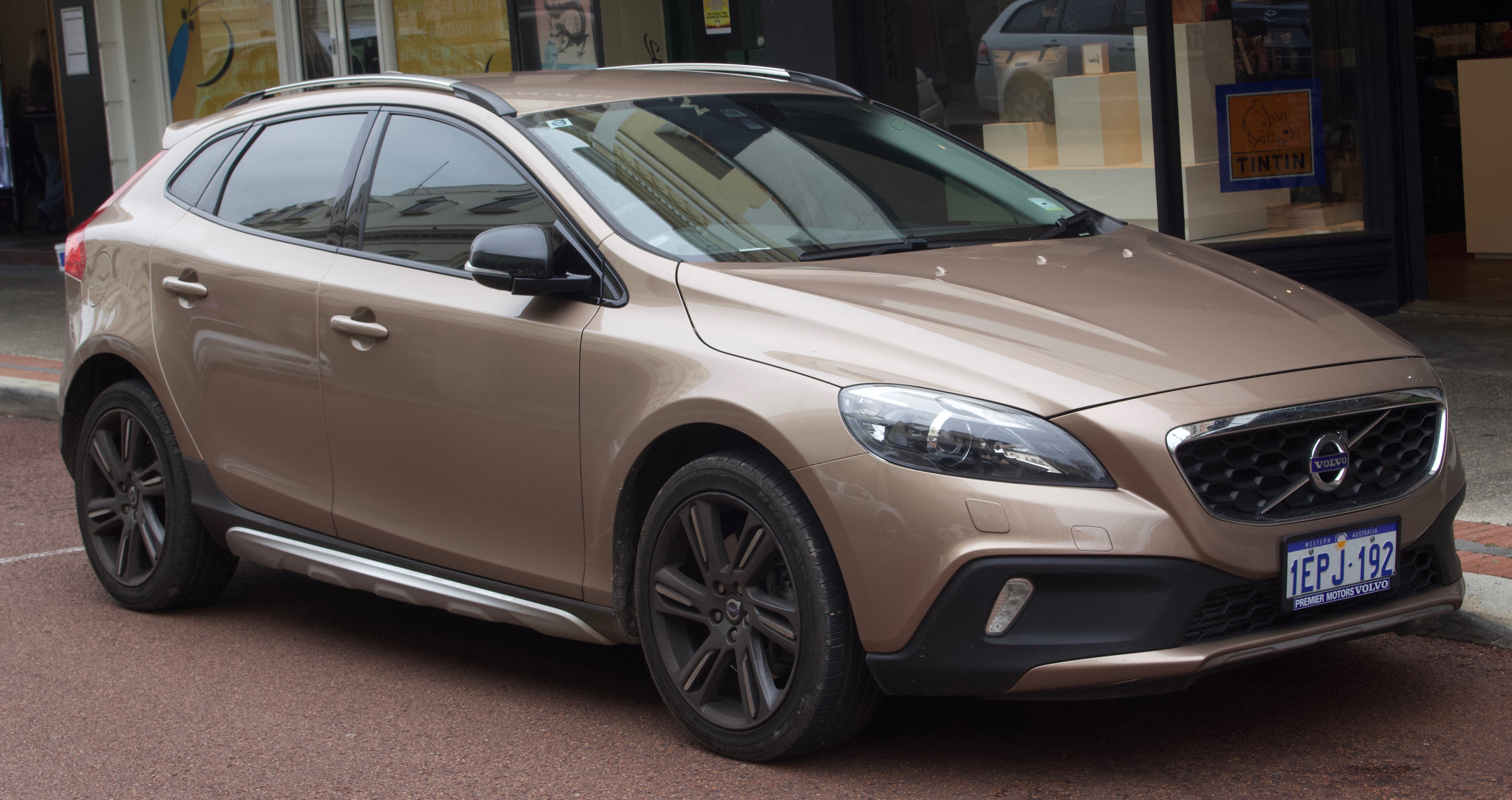
Volvo V40 Cross Country (AU; pre facelift)

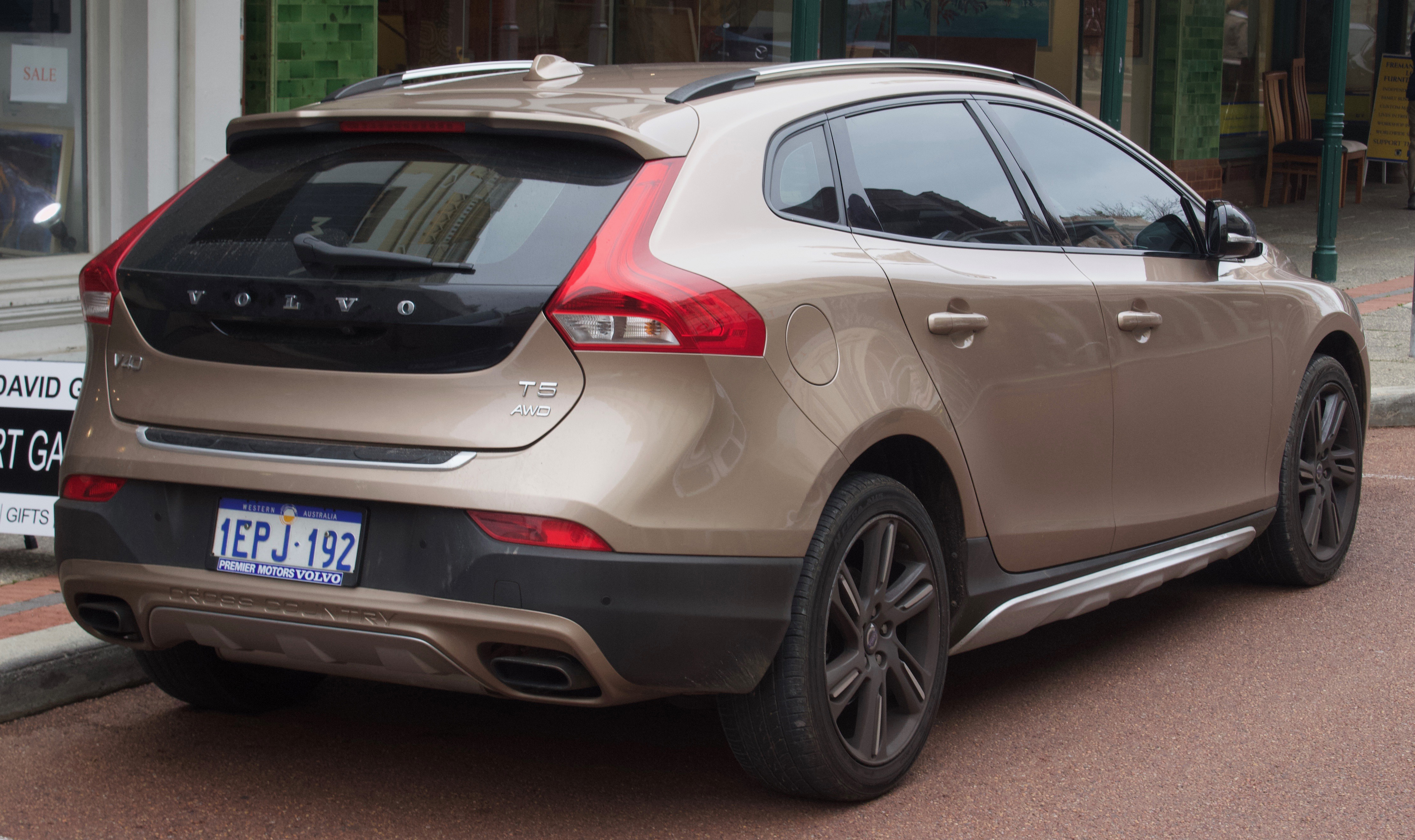
Volvo V40 Cross Country (AU; pre facelift)

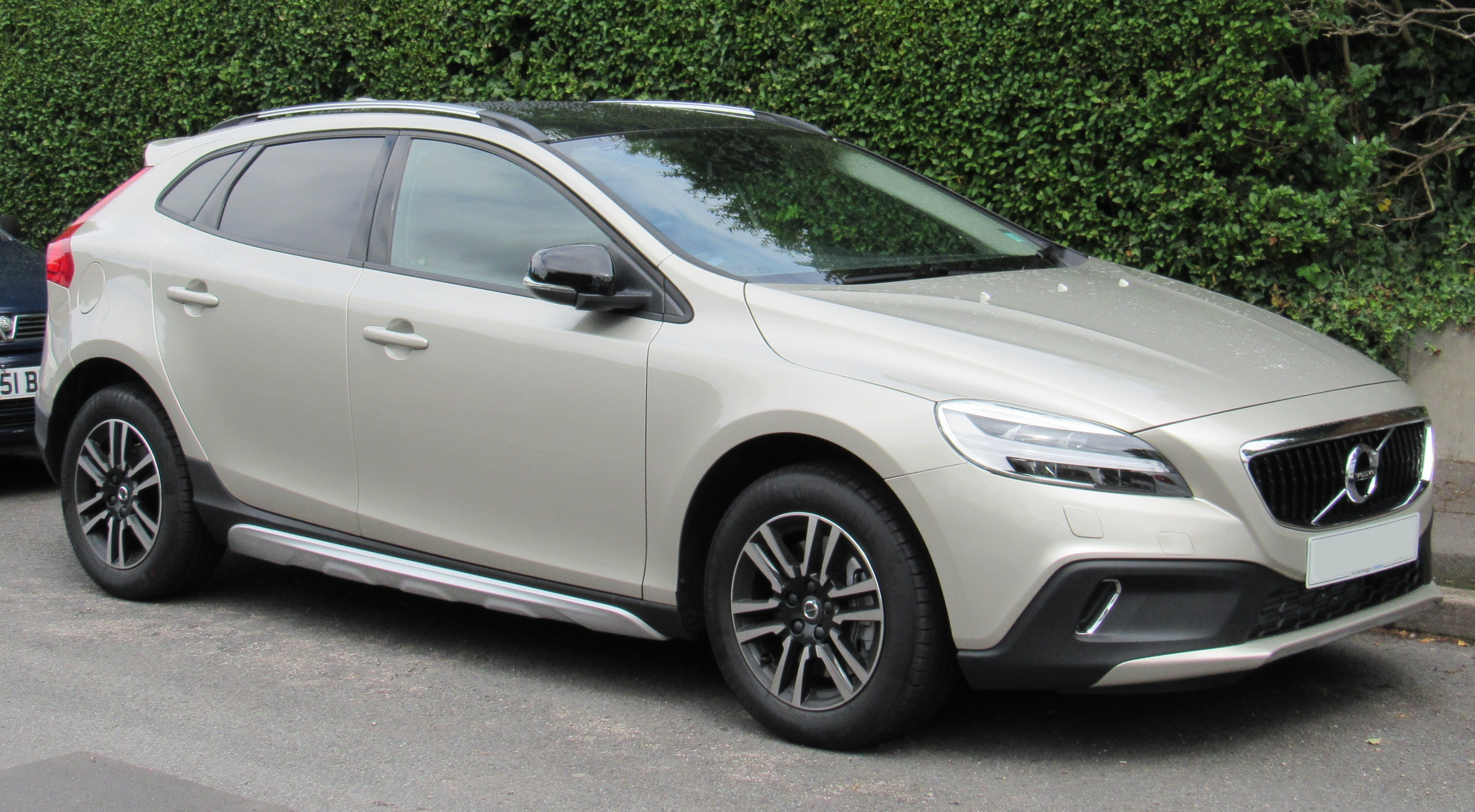
Volvo V40 Cross Country (UK; facelift)

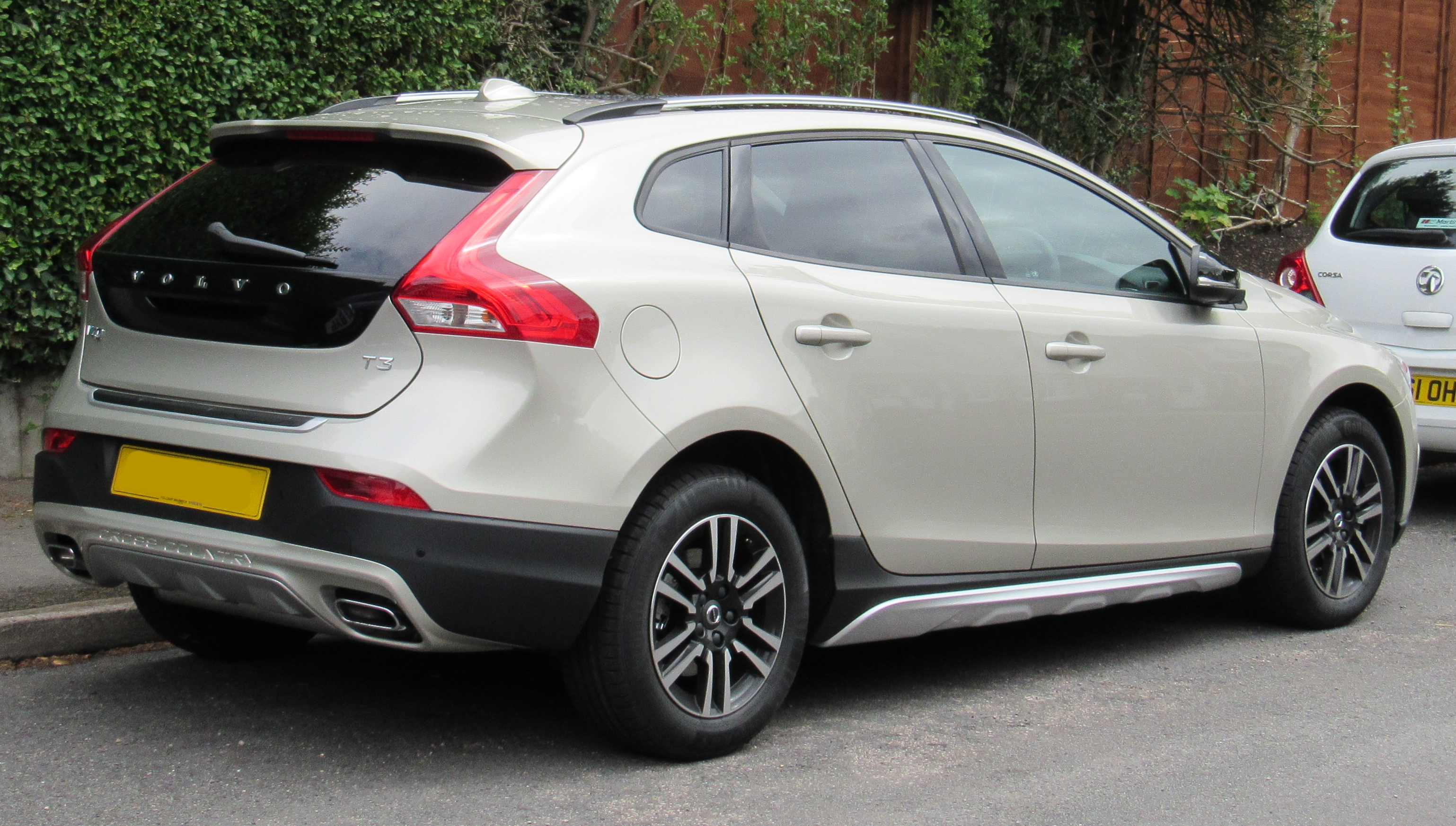
Volvo V40 Cross Country (UK; facelift)

== Engines ==
Petrol engines
Model	Engine code	Year(s)	Power	Torque at rpm	Displacement	Comment
T2	B4164T3	2012–2015	122 PS (90 kW; 120 hp)	240 N⋅m (177 lb⋅ft) at 1600–4000	1,596 cc (97.4 cu in)	EcoBoost
T3	B4164T3	2012–2015	150 PS (110 kW; 148 hp)	240 N⋅m (177 lb⋅ft) at 1600–4000	1,596 cc (97.4 cu in)	EcoBoost
T4	B4164T	2012–2015	180 PS (132 kW; 178 hp)	240 N⋅m (177 lb⋅ft) at 1600–5000	1,596 cc (97.4 cu in)	EcoBoost
T4	B5204T8	2012–2015	180 PS (132 kW; 178 hp)	300 N⋅m (221 lb⋅ft) at 2700–4200	1,984 cc (121.1 cu in)	VME
T5	B5204T9	2013-2015	213 PS (157 kW; 210 hp)	300 N⋅m (221 lb⋅ft) at 2500	1,984 cc (121.1 cu in)	VME
T5	B5254T14	2013–2015	249 PS (183 kW; 246 hp)	360 N⋅m (266 lb⋅ft) at 1800–4200	2,497 cc (152.4 cu in)	VME
T5	B5254T12	2013–2015	254 PS (187 kW; 251 hp)	360 N⋅m (266 lb⋅ft) at 1800–4800	2,497 cc (152.4 cu in)	VME, AWD Only
T2	B4154T5	2016–2019	122 PS (90 kW; 120 hp)	220 N⋅m (162 lb⋅ft) at 1600–3500	1,498 cc (91.4 cu in)	VEA, Automatic models only
T3	B4154T6	2015–2019	152 PS (112 kW; 150 hp)	250 N⋅m (184 lb⋅ft) at 1700–4000	1,498 cc (91.4 cu in)	VEA, Automatic models only
T2	B4204T38	2015–2019	122 PS (90 kW; 120 hp)	220 N⋅m (162 lb⋅ft) at 1100–3500	1,969 cc (120.2 cu in)	VEA
T3	B4204T37	2015–2019	152 PS (112 kW; 150 hp)	250 N⋅m (184 lb⋅ft) at 1300–4000	1,969 cc (120.2 cu in)	VEA
T4	B4204T19	2015–2019	190 PS (140 kW; 187 hp)	300 N⋅m (221 lb⋅ft) at 1300–4000	1,969 cc (120.2 cu in)	VEA
T4	B4204T41	2015–2019	248 PS (182 kW; 245 hp)	350 N⋅m (258 lb⋅ft) at 1500–4800	1,969 cc (120.2 cu in)	VEA
T5	B4204T11	2015–2019	248 PS (182 kW; 245 hp)	350 N⋅m (258 lb⋅ft) at 1500–4800	1,969 cc (120.2 cu in)	VEA

Diesel engines
Model	Engine code	Year(s)	Power	Torque at rpm	Displacement	Comment
D2	D4162T	2012–2015	115 PS (85 kW; 113 hp)	270 N⋅m (199 lb⋅ft) at 1750–2500	1,560 cc (95.2 cu in)	PSA DV6
D3	D5204T6	2012–2015	150 PS (110 kW; 148 hp)	350 N⋅m (258 lb⋅ft) at 1500–2750	1,984 cc (121.1 cu in)	VD5
D4	D5204T4	2012–2015	177 PS (130 kW; 175 hp)	400 N⋅m (295 lb⋅ft) at 1750–2750	1,984 cc (121.1 cu in)	VD5
D2	D4204T8	2015–2019	121 PS (89 kW; 119 hp)	280 N⋅m (207 lb⋅ft) at 1500–2250	1,969 cc (120.2 cu in)	VEA
D3	D4204T9	2015–2019	152 PS (112 kW; 150 hp)	320 N⋅m (236 lb⋅ft) at 1750–3000	1,969 cc (120.2 cu in)	VEA
D4	D4204T14	2015–2019	192 PS (141 kW; 189 hp)	400 N⋅m (295 lb⋅ft) at 1750–2500	1,969 cc (120.2 cu in)	VEA

The 1.5 petrol VEA is a destroked version of the 2.0 petrol VEA, with matching bores of 82.0 mm, but the 1.5 having a stroke of 70.9 mm compared to the 2.0's 93.2 mm

== Safety ==
ANCAP test results* Volvo V40 D2 variants (2013)
Test	Score
Overall	5 /5 stars
Frontal offset	15.67/16
Side impact	16/16
Pole	2/2
Seat belt reminders	3/3
Whiplash protection	Adequate
Pedestrian protection	Good
Electronic stability control	Standard

== Awards ==
- Best Executive Hatch, at the Scottish Car of the Year awards in 2012, which was held in Glasgow, Scotland on 14 October 2012.
- Auto Express Safety Award 2013, held at Grand Connaught Rooms, London on 2 July 2013.
- Best Medium Family Car and 2013 Car of the Year, by the motoring website Carsite.co.uk on 2 July 2013.
- Tow Car Awards 2013: The V40 Cross Country was recognized for its towing performance, with a 30-60 mph time of 11.7 seconds when towing a caravan.
- Road Safety Award 2014: The V40 received the Road Safety Award in 2014, acknowledging its innovative safety features and high Euro NCAP ratings.
- Tow Car Awards 2015: The V40 Cross Country variant was praised for its towing capabilities, achieving a 30-60 mph time of 9.8 seconds with a caravan in tow.
