= Volvo S70 =

Swedish compact executive sedan

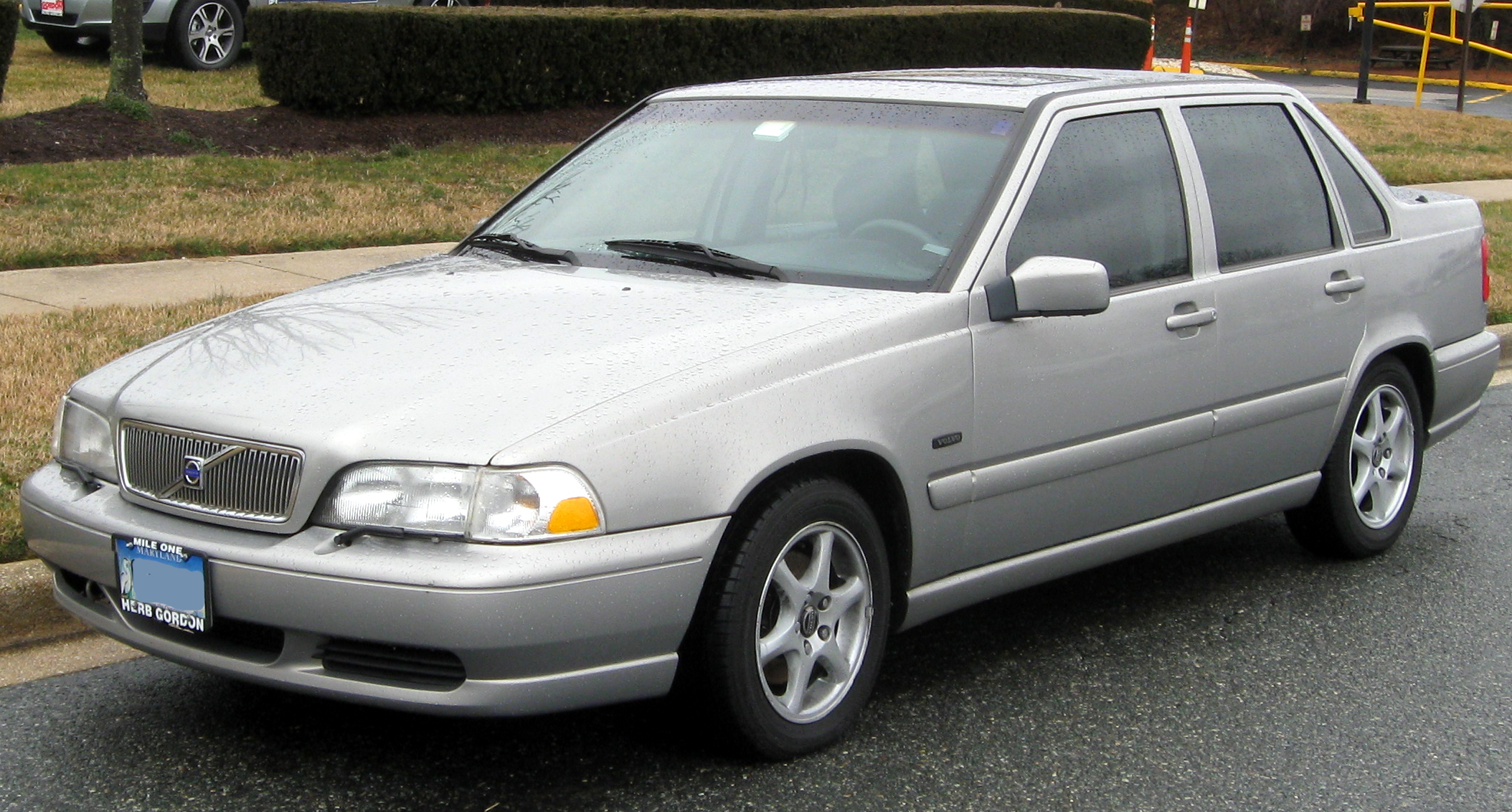
- 1998 Volvo S70 (US)

Overview
- Manufacturer: Volvo Cars
- Production: 1996–2000 (243,078 units)
- Model years: 1997–2000
- Assembly: Sweden: Torslanda (Torslandaverken); Belgium: Ghent (VCG); Canada: Halifax (VHA)
- Designer: Peter Horbury (exterior); José Luis Diaz de la Vega (interior)

Body and chassis
- Class: Compact executive car (D)
- Body style: 4-door saloon
- Layout: Transverse Front engine; front-wheel drive or four-wheel drive
- Platform: Volvo P80 platform
- Related: Volvo V70

Powertrain
- Engine: 2.0 L I5 (petrol); 2.3 L I5 (petrol); 2.4 L I5 (petrol); 2.4 L I5 turbo (petrol); 2.4 L B5244SG I5 (Bi-Fuel); 2.5 L I5 (petrol); 2.5 L I5 turbo (petrol); 2.5 L Volvo D5252T I5 (diesel)
- Transmission: 5-speed Volvo M56 manual; 5-speed Volvo M58 manual; 5-speed Volvo M59 manual; 4-speed Aisin AW50-42LE automatic; 5-speed Aisin AW55-50/51SN automatic

Dimensions
- Wheelbase: FWD: 2,664 mm (104.9 in); AWD: 2,654 mm (104.5 in)
- Length: 4,722 mm (185.9 in)
- Width: 1,760 mm (69.3 in)
- Height: FWD: 1,402 mm (55.2 in); AWD: 1,448 mm (57.0 in)
- Kerb weight: FWD: 1,428–1,510 kg (3,148–3,329 lb); AWD: 1,600–1,635 kg (3,527–3,605 lb)

Chronology
- Predecessor: Volvo 850 saloon
- Successor: Volvo S60

The Volvo S70 is a compact executive car produced by Volvo Cars from 1996 to 2000. Introduced as the successor to the Volvo 850 saloon, the S70 featured revised exterior styling and an updated interior. It was succeeded by the Volvo S60 in 2000.

== Overview ==
Introduced in Europe in late 1996 for the 1997 model year and later in the US for the 1998 model year, the Volvo S70 is an updated version of the Volvo 850 saloon. The S70 features more rounded exterior styling than its predecessor. Changes included a redesigned front end with new lights, fully colour-coded bumpers and side trim, and clear indicator lenses for the rear lights, as well as a redesigned interior. According to Volvo, a total of 1800 changes were made.

Standard equipment included remote central locking, heated and electrically adjustable door mirrors, anti-lock brakes (ABS) and electric windows. Four airbags were standard on US-market models for the 1998 model year.

Trim levels and standard equipment varied by market. In the United States, the S70 was offered in base, GLT and T5 versions, which differed in engine output and standard equipment. In the United Kingdom, Volvo offered different specification levels, equipment packs and optional extras. The T5 and R were the range's high-performance variants.

For the 1999 model year, the S70 received minor exterior updates and more extensive mechanical changes. Exterior changes included a revised Volvo badge on the front grille and side-mounted indicators on the front wings of US-market models.

Volvo introduced its second-generation Side Impact Protection System side airbag (SIPS-BAG II), which was enlarged to provide protection for the head as well as the chest. Turbocharged petrol engines received new engine management systems with electronic throttle control. An upgraded traction control system, known as Stability and Traction Control (STC), was introduced on front-wheel-drive T5 models, using both brake intervention and engine torque reduction to limit wheelspin. The anti-lock braking system (ABS) was upgraded from three to four channels. Automatic transmissions received adaptive shift logic, while manual-transmission models gained a starter interlock.

Later-production all-wheel-drive models received thicker rear brake discs and redesigned rear calipers.

For the 2000 model year, a new five-speed automatic transmission with adaptive shift logic was introduced, available on naturally aspirated, front-wheel-drive models in North America. The 10-valve petrol engine variants were phased out in favour of lower-output 20-valve versions in some European markets. Non-turbocharged petrol engines also featured electronic throttle control.

Volvo's Whiplash Protection System (WHIPS), designed to reduce the risk of neck injuries in rear-end collisions, became standard equipment for the 2000 model year.

== Models ==
=== S70 ===
Production of the S70 was lower than that of its estate counterpart, the V70, with 243,078 S70 saloons built compared with 319,832 first-generation V70 estates.

The S70 was available with petrol engines, as well as diesel and Bi-Fuel variants in certain markets. A contemporary British-market brochure listed engine outputs ranging from 126 to 250 bhp.

The S70 was also used as a police vehicle in several countries. In the United Kingdom, T5 saloons were used by various police forces. In Canada, VehiTech offered police-package versions of the S70 and V70, with police equipment installed at its facility in Longueuil, Quebec. In August 2001, Canadian news outlet TVA Nouvelles reported that the Saint-Adolphe-d'Howard police department operated an S70 patrol car.

In the United States, the California Highway Patrol evaluated the S70 as a potential patrol vehicle in 1999. The vehicles featured upgraded chassis components and brakes compared with civilian models, and further on-road testing was planned to determine their suitability for police service.

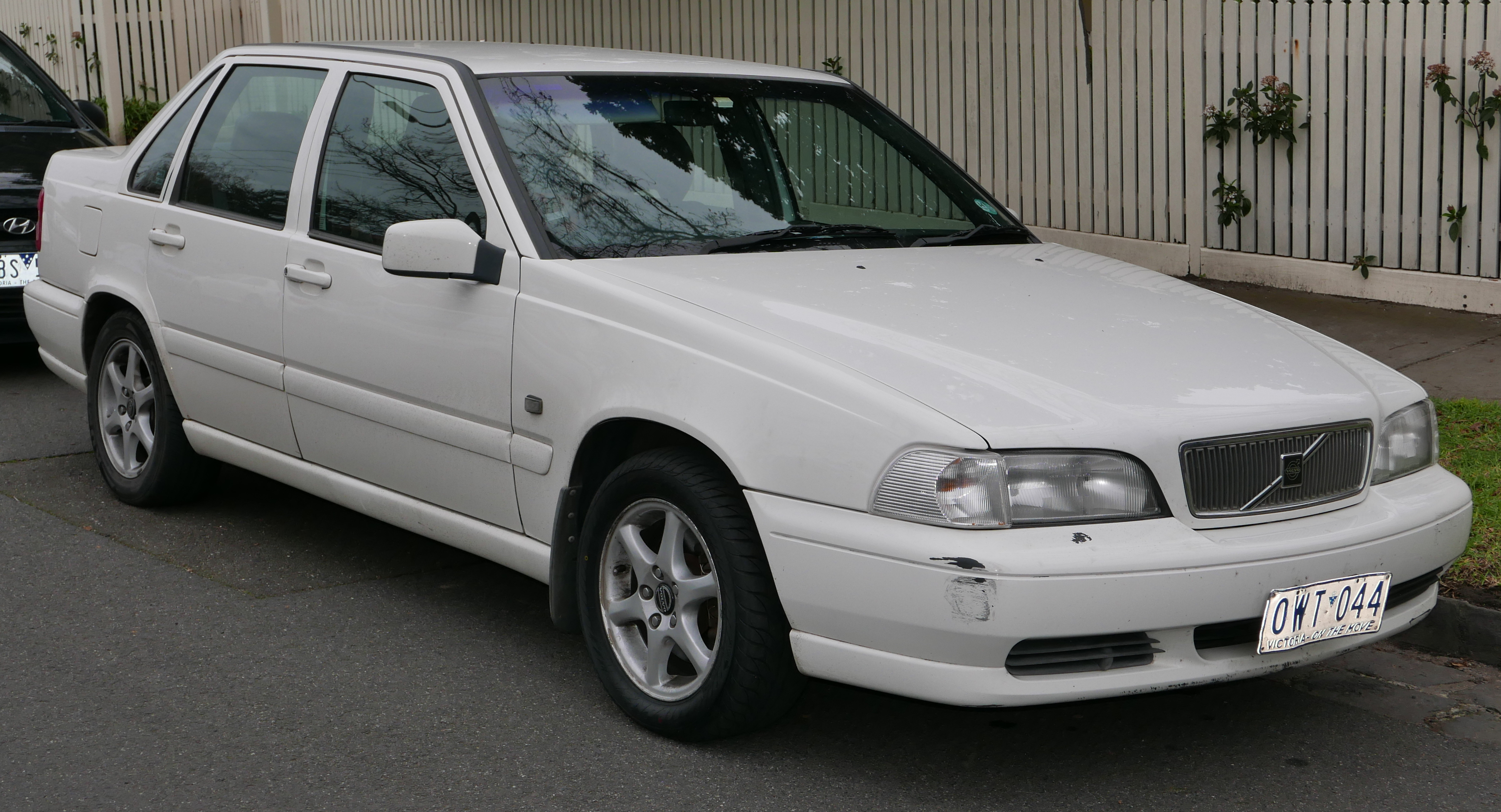
Volvo S70 (AU)

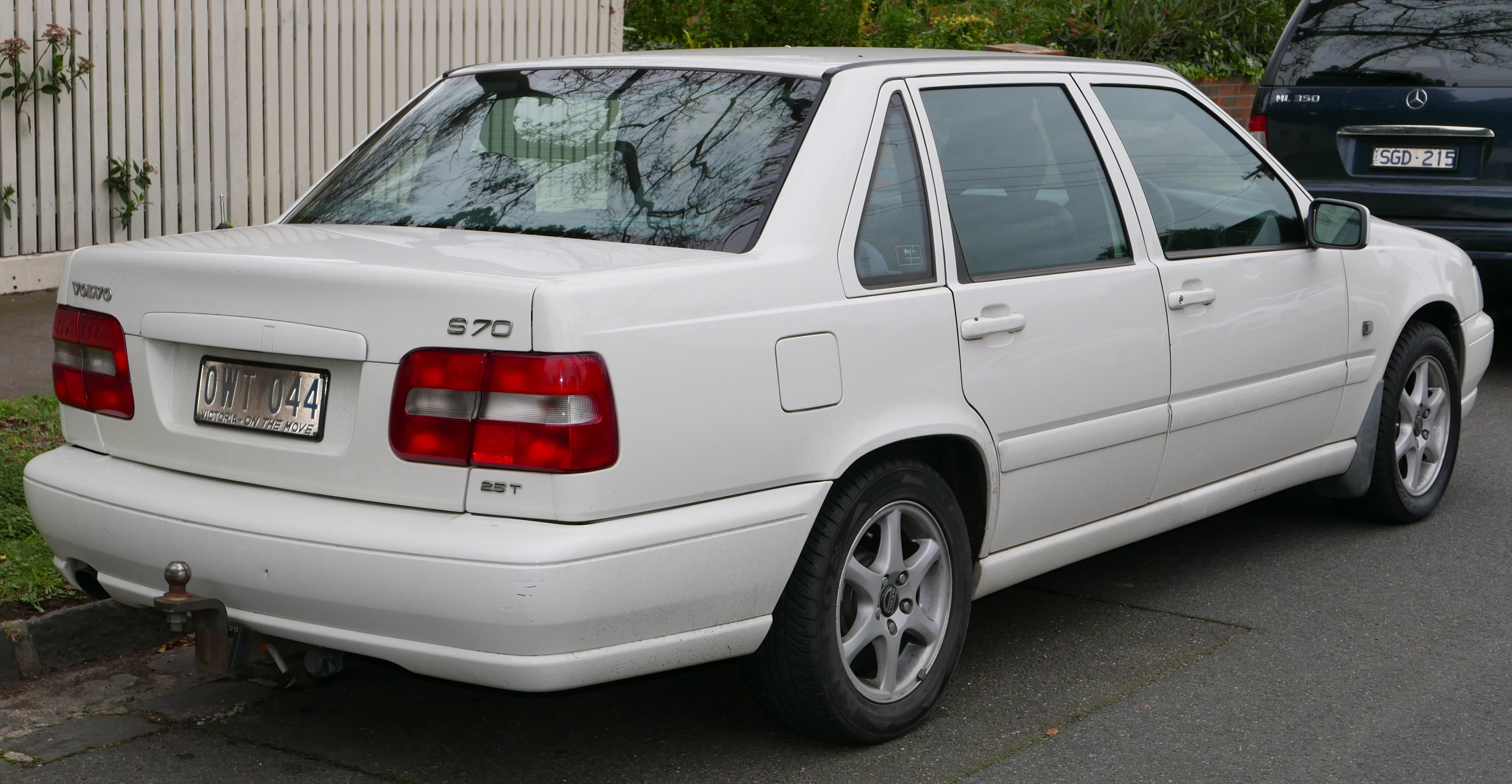
Volvo S70 (AU)

=== S70 AWD ===
Announced in 1998, the S70 AWD was the all-wheel-drive variant of the S70, remaining available until the model's discontinuation in 2000. It shared its chassis configuration and viscous-coupling all-wheel-drive system with the V70 AWD. Some examples featured self-levelling rear suspension using Nivomat shock absorbers.

The S70 AWD was powered by a turbocharged 2.4-litre five-cylinder petrol engine producing 193 PS (142 kW). Transmission options included a four-speed automatic and a five-speed manual, depending on specification.

=== S70 R ===
The S70 R was introduced in 1997 as the highest-performance variant of the S70. The model was offered for the 1998 model year. Available exclusively with front-wheel drive, it featured a turbocharged 2.3-litre five-cylinder petrol engine producing 250 metric horsepower (184 kW; 247 hp) and 350 newton-metres (258 lb⋅ft) when paired with a five-speed manual gearbox and a viscous-coupling limited-slip differential. Models equipped with a four-speed automatic gearbox produced 240 metric horsepower (177 kW; 237 hp) and 330 newton-metres (243 lb⋅ft).

The S70 R featured a lowered sports chassis with revised anti-roll bars and shock absorbers. Interior features included leather and quilted Alcantara upholstery, aluminium trim and blue-backed instruments. Exterior features included 17-inch Comet alloy wheels and a rear spoiler. Standard equipment also included electronic climate control, electrically adjustable front seats and an upgraded SC900 stereo system. Available paint colours included Saffron, black, silver, dark blue and ruby red.

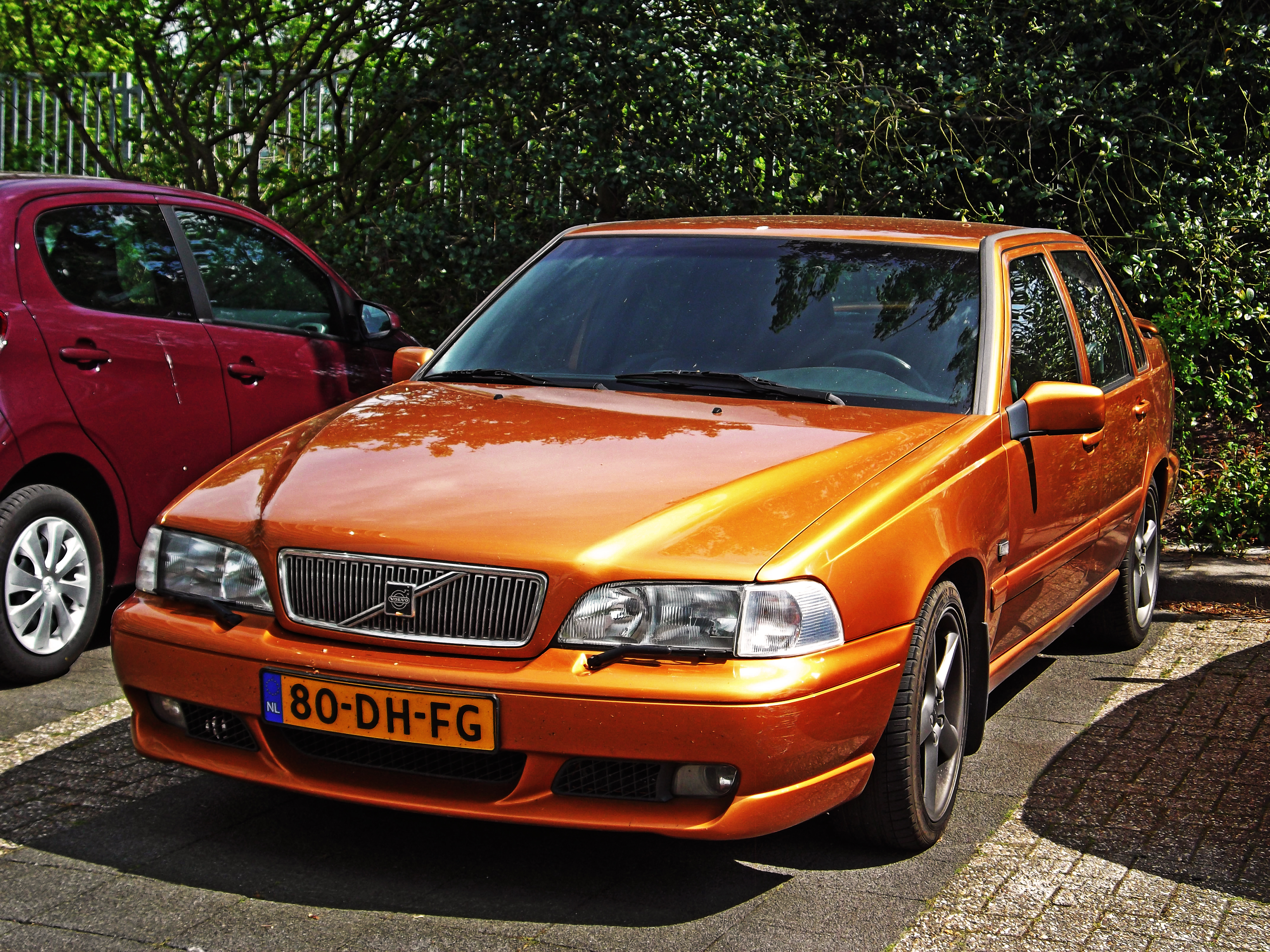
Volvo S70 R (Note: Showing special colour Saffron)

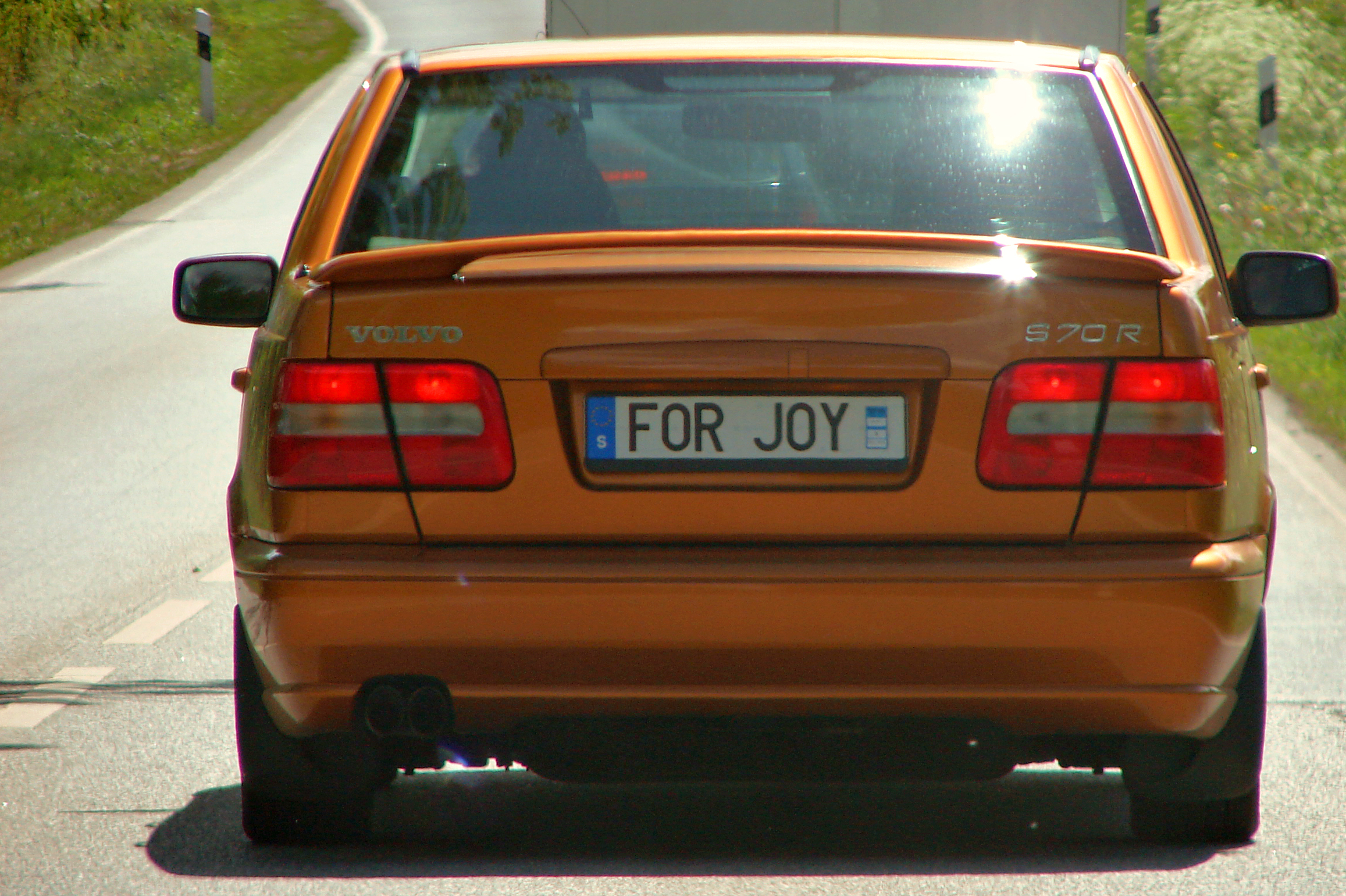
Volvo S70 R (Note: Showing rear spoiler and S70 R badging)

== Engines ==
Petrol engines
Model	Engine code	Year(s)	Power	Torque at rpm	Displacement	0–100 km/h (0–62 mph)
2.0 10V	B5202FS	1997–1998	126 PS (93 kW; 124 hp)	170 N⋅m (125 lb⋅ft) at 4800	1,984 cc (121.1 in^{3})	11.7 s (Manual); 12.1 s (Auto)
2.4 20V	B5244S	2000	170 PS (125 kW; 168 hp)	230 N⋅m (170 lb⋅ft) at 4800	2,435 cc (148.6 in^{3})	8.8 s (Manual); 9.8 s (Auto)
2.4 20V (140 PS)	B5244S2	2000	140 PS (103 kW; 138 hp)	220 N⋅m (162 lb⋅ft) at 3750	2,435 cc (148.6 in^{3})	9.9 s (Manual); 10.9 s (Auto)
2.5 10V	B5252FS	1997–1999	144 PS (106 kW; 142 hp)	206 N⋅m (152 lb⋅ft) at 3600	2,435 cc (148.6 in^{3})	10.2 s (Manual); 10.6 s (Auto)
2.5 20V	B5254FS	1997–1999	170 PS (125 kW; 168 hp)	220 N⋅m (162 lb⋅ft) at 3300	2,435 cc (148.6 in^{3})	8.9 s (Manual); 10.0 s (Auto)
2.5 20V	B5254S	1999	170 PS (125 kW; 168 hp)	220 N⋅m (162 lb⋅ft) at 4700	2,435 cc (148.6 in^{3})	8.9 s (Manual); 10.0 s (Auto)
2.0T	B5204T2	1997–2000	180 PS (132 kW; 178 hp)	220 N⋅m (162 lb⋅ft) at 2100	1,984 cc (121.1 in^{3})	9.3 s (Manual); 10.0 s (Auto)
2.5T; 2.5T AWD	B5254T	1997–1999	193 PS (142 kW; 190 hp)	270 N⋅m (199 lb⋅ft) at 1800	2,435 cc (148.6 in^{3})	7.8 s (Manual FWD); 8.2 s (Auto FWD)
2.4T; 2.4T AWD	B5244T	2000	193 PS (142 kW; 190 hp)	270 N⋅m (199 lb⋅ft) at 1800	2,435 cc (148.6 in^{3})	7.8 s (Manual FWD); 8.2 s (Auto FWD); 8.3 s (Manual AWD); 8.7 s (Auto AWD)
T5 2.0	B5204T3	1997–1999	225 PS (165 kW; 222 hp)	310 N⋅m (229 lb⋅ft) at 2700–5100	1,984 cc (121.1 in^{3})	7.7 s (Manual); 7.8 s (Auto)
T5 2.3	B5234T3	1997–2000	240 PS (177 kW; 237 hp)	330 N⋅m (243 lb⋅ft) at 2700	2,319 cc (141.5 in^{3})	7.0 s (Manual); 7.3 s (Auto)
R; (Manual)	B5234T4	1998	250 PS (184 kW; 247 hp)	350 N⋅m (258 lb⋅ft) at 2700	2,319 cc (141.5 in^{3})	6.7 s
R; (Auto)	B5234T3	1998	240 PS (177 kW; 237 hp)	330 N⋅m (243 lb⋅ft) at 2700	2,319 cc (141.5 in^{3})	7.3 s

Diesel engines
Model	Engine code	Year(s)	Power	Torque at rpm	Displacement	0–100 km/h (0–62 mph)
2.5 D (TDI)	D5252T	1997–2000	140 PS (103 kW; 138 hp)	290 N⋅m (214 lb⋅ft) at 1900	2,460 cc (150.1 in^{3})	9.9 s (Manual); 10.7 s (Auto)

The D5252T was a modified version of an Audi 2.5-litre five-cylinder turbodiesel engine. Bosch MSA 15.7 and MSA 15.8 engine-management versions were used during production.

Bi-Fuel engines
Model	Engine code	Year(s)	Power	Torque at rpm	Displacement	0–100 km/h (0–62 mph)
Bi-Fuel (CNG)	GB5252S / GB5252S2	1998–1999	144 PS (106 kW; 142 hp) (petrol)	206 N⋅m (152 lb⋅ft) at 3600 (petrol)	2,435 cc (148.6 in^{3})	
Bi-Fuel (CNG)	B5244SG	1999–2000	140 PS (103 kW; 138 hp)	—	2,435 cc (148.6 in^{3})	
Bi-Fuel (LPG)	B5244SG2	1999–2000	140 PS (103 kW; 138 hp)	—	2,435 cc (148.6 in^{3})	

== See also ==
- Volvo S40 – smaller saloon from Volvo's contemporary model range
