= Volvo Modular Engine =

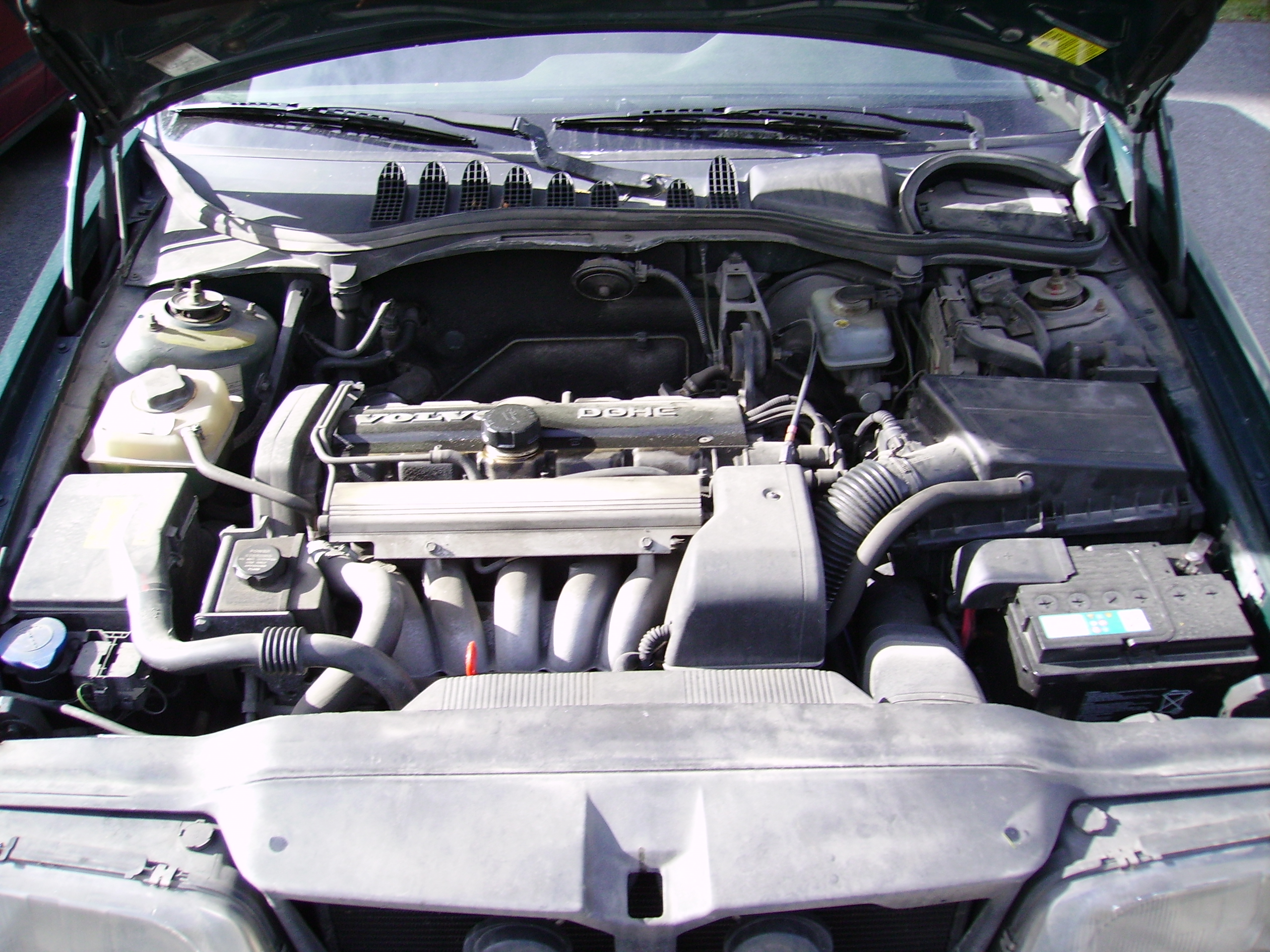

Overview
- Manufacturer: Volvo Cars
- Production: 1990–2016

Layout
- Configuration: I4, I5, I6
- Displacement: 1.6 L – 3.0 L
- Cylinder block material: Aluminium
- Cylinder head material: Aluminium
- Valvetrain: DOHC

Combustion
- Fuel system: Fuel injection
- Management: Bosch LH-Jetronic; Bosch Motronic; Bosch ME Motronic; Siemens Fenix; Siemens EMS 2000; Denso EMS; Necam MEGA (Note: Multi-Point Electronic Gas Injection)
- Fuel type: Petrol; LPG; CNG
- Oil system: Wet sump
- Cooling system: Water-cooled

Emissions
- Emissions target standard: Euro 1 - Euro 5+; ULEV; SULEV
- Emissions control systems: Catalytic converter; Catalytic converter and EGR

Chronology
- Predecessor: PRV (6cyl); Redblock (4cyl)
- Successor: VEA (general replacement); SI6 (6cyl)

The Volvo Modular Engine is a family of straight-four, straight-five, and straight-six automobile piston engines that was produced by Volvo Cars in Skövde, Sweden from 1990 until 2016. All engines feature an aluminium engine block and aluminium cylinder head, forged steel connecting rods, aluminium pistons and double overhead camshafts.

== History ==
The Volvo Modular Engine was developed as part of Project Galaxy which began in the late 1970s. The prototype engines called X-100 had only four cylinders but already featured the sandwich and all aluminium construction of the later production variants. Early prototypes of the X-100 were designed similar to the existing redblock engines with a single camshaft and the oil filter mounted on the side of the engine rather than the bottom.

The first available engine was the B6304F which debuted in August 1990 in the Volvo 960. A year later, with the introduction of the Volvo 850 in June 1991, the first five-cylinder variant in form of the B5254F hit the market. It was equipped with V-VIS (Volvo Variable Intake System) which was designed to improve engine response between 1500 and 4100 rpm. V-VIS was only available on naturally aspirated 20V engines with the Bosch LH-3.2/EZ-129K engine management. The system was discontinued after model year 1996. In 1995, with the launch of the Volvo S40 the four-cylinder B4184S and B4204S engines were released. The same year Volvo shared the B4204S and B5244S engines with Renault, who used them in the Laguna and Safrane models under the name N7Q and N7U.
In 1998, with the introduction of the 1999 model year S80, Volvo began to transition to updated versions of their N-series engines, now called RN, short for revised N. Drive-by-wire, coil-on-plug systems and variable valve timing (VVT) were introduced along with new engine management systems. 10-valve engines were slowly phased out in favour of detuned 20-valve versions.

With the introduction of the second generation S40 in 2003 another update to the engine family took place. The new engine was called RNC, the 'C' standing for 'compact' to emphasise the decrease in overall dimensions. Compared to the previous generation the new engine was 200mm slimmer (Note: Total width including manifolds) and 25mm shorter. On turbocharged engines the exhaust manifold and turbine housing were now combined into one part; all engines were equipped with plastic intake manifolds and continuously variable valve timing (CVVT).
The RN engines remained in production alongside the RNC engines and were slowly phased out, beginning with the introduction of the second generation S80 in 2006. The new SI6 engine family was introduced to replace the 6-cylinder variants of the Volvo Modular Engine at the same time.

=== Nomenclature ===
The engine codes consist of a series of letters and digits:

- 1st: Fuel type (B/D/GB) B = Bensin (Petrol), D = Diesel, GB (Note: First generation Bi-Fuel models with NECAM & Fenix 5.2 engine management) = Gas & Bensin
- 2nd: Number of cylinders (4/5/6)
- 3rd & 4th: Approximate displacement in deciliters, may be rounded up or down. (23 ~= 2.3 L)
- 5th: Valves per cylinder (2/4)
- 6th: Induction method (S/T/F/G/GS/FS/FT/SG) S = standard (naturally aspirated), T = turbocharged, F = fuel injection with catalytic converter, G = leaded fuel compatible, GS = leaded fuel compatible, naturally aspirated, FS = fuel injected standard (naturally aspirated) with catalytic converter, FT = fuel injected, turbocharged with catalytic converter, SG = standard (naturally aspirated) compatible with alternative fuels (LPG / CNG)
- 7th: Engine generation or engine variant (2/3/4/5/6/7/8/9/10/11)

Engine codes are not necessarily unique to a specific engine as power levels can vary depending on market, manufacturer and model.

== Four-cylinder engines (B4) ==
=== B4164 (1.6) ===
==== B4164S ====
The B4164S is a 1.6 L (1,587 cc) straight-four. Bore is 81 mm (3.2 in) and stroke is 77 mm (3.0 in) with a compression ratio of 10.5:1. It is naturally aspirated with a power output of 105 PS (77 kW; 104 hp) at 5500 rpm with 143 N⋅m (105 lb⋅ft) of torque at 4200 rpm. It is equipped with Siemens Fenix 5.1 engine management.

Applications:

- 1996–1999 Volvo S40 badged as S40 1.6
- 1996–1999 Volvo V40 badged as V40 1.6

==== B4164S2 ====
The B4164S2 is a 1.6 L (1,587 cc) straight-four. Bore is 81 mm (3.2 in) and stroke is 77 mm (3.0 in) with a compression ratio of 10:1. It is naturally aspirated with a power output of 109 PS (80 kW; 108 hp) at 5800 rpm with 145 N⋅m (107 lb⋅ft) of torque at 4000 rpm. It features intake cam VVT.

Applications:

- 2000–2004 Volvo S40 badged S40 1.6 or S40 1.6 SE
- 2000–2004 Volvo V40 badged V40 1.6 or V40 1.6 SE

=== B4184 (1.8) ===
==== B4184S ====
The B4184S is a 1.8 L (1,731 cc) straight-four. Bore is 83 mm (3.3 in) and stroke is 80.0 mm (3.1 in) with a compression ratio of 10.5:1. It is naturally aspirated with a power output of 115 PS (85 kW; 113 hp) at 5500 rpm with 165 N⋅m (122 lb⋅ft) of torque at 4100 rpm. It is equipped with Siemens Fenix 5.1 engine management.

Applications:

- 1995–1999 Volvo S40 badged as S40 1.8 or S40 1.8 16V
- 1995–1999 Volvo V40 badged as V40 1.8 or V40 1.8 16V

==== B4184S2 ====
The B4184S2 is a 1.8 L (1,783 cc) straight-four. Bore is 83 mm (3.3 in) and stroke is 82.4 mm (3.2 in). It is naturally aspirated with a power output of 122 PS (90 kW; 120 hp) at 5800 rpm with 170 N⋅m (125 lb⋅ft) of torque at 4000 rpm. It features intake cam VVT.

Applications:

- 1999–2004 Volvo S40 badged as S40 1.8i or S40 1.8i SE
- 1999–2004 Volvo V40 badged as V40 1.8i or V40 1.8i SE

The S40 V40 1.8 also came with a Mitsubishi 4G93 gasoline direct-injection engine (GDI) These displace 1834 cc and were given type designation B4184SM and B4184SJ by Volvo. These engines bear no resemblance to the Volvo engines.

==== B4184S3 ====
The B4184S3 is a 1.8 L (1,783 cc) straight-four. Bore is 83 mm (3.3 in) and stroke is 82.4 mm (3.2 in). It is naturally aspirated with a power output of 116 PS (85 kW; 114 hp) at 5800 rpm with 170 N⋅m (125 lb⋅ft) of torque at 4000 rpm. It features intake cam VVT.

Applications:

- 2001–2004 Volvo S40 badged as S40 1.8
- 2001–2004 Volvo V40 badged as V40 1.8

=== B4194 (1.9) ===
==== B4194T ====
The B4194T is a 1.9 L (1,855 cc) straight-four. Bore is 81 mm (3.2 in) and stroke is 90 mm (3.5 in) with a compression ratio of 8.5:1. It is turbocharged and intercooled with a power output of 200 PS (147 kW; 197 hp) at 5500 rpm with 300 N⋅m (220 lb⋅ft) of torque at 2400–3600 rpm. It is equipped with Siemens EMS 2000 engine management and is equipped with a TD04L-14T turbocharger. There was also a B4194T2 variant.

Specifications:

- Rod length: 139.5 mm (5.5 in)

Applications:

- 1997–2000 Volvo S40 badged as S40 T4
- 1997–2000 Volvo V40 badged as V40 T4

=== B4204 (1.9) ===
The B4204 are 1.9 L (1,948 cc) straight-fours; although they are typically treated like 2-liter engines by Volvo in terms of nomenclature. Bore is 83 mm (3.3 in) and stroke is 90 mm (3.5 in). Volvo also used the names B4204S3 and -S4 for the Mazda LF engine which was installed in a number of Volvos beginning in 2006, while the Ford-developed, turbocharged EcoBoost derivative was given the names B4204T6 and -T7 by Volvo.

==== B4204S ====
The B4204S is a 1.9 L (1,948 cc) straight-four with a compression ratio of 10.5:1. It is naturally aspirated with a power output of 140 PS (103 kW; 138 hp) at 6000 rpm with 183 N⋅m (135 lb⋅ft) of torque at 4500 rpm. It is equipped with Siemens Fenix 5.1 engine management. Renault called this engine the N7Q when installed in their cars.

Applications:

- 1995–2000 Volvo S40 badged as S40 2.0
- 1995–2000 Volvo V40 badged as V40 2.0
- 1996–2000 Renault Safrane badged as Safrane 2.0
- 1995–1999 Renault Laguna badged as Laguna RTi 16v

==== B4204S2 ====
The B4204S2 is a 1.9 L (1,948 cc) straight-four. It is naturally aspirated and features variable valve timing (VVT).

==== B4204T ====
The B4204T is a 1.9 L (1,948 cc) straight-four with a compression ratio of 9.0:1. It is turbocharged and intercooled with a power output of 160 PS (118 kW; 158 hp) at 5100 rpm, and produces 230 N⋅m (170 lb⋅ft) of torque at 1800–4800 rpm. It is equipped with Siemens EMS 2000 engine management and is equipped with a TD04L-12T turbocharger.

Applications:

- 1998–1999 Volvo S40 badged as S40 2.0T
- 1998–1999 Volvo V40 badged as V40 2.0T

==== B4204T2 ====
The B4204T2 is a 1.9 L (1,948 cc) straight-four. Bore is 83 mm (3.3 in) and stroke is 90 mm (3.5 in). It is turbocharged and intercooled with a power output of 160 PS (118 kW; 158 hp) at 5100 rpm with 230 N⋅m (170 lb⋅ft) of torque at 1800–4800 rpm. It features variable valve timing (VVT).

Applications:

- 2000 Volvo S40 badged as S40 2.0T
- 2000 Volvo V40 badged as V40 2.0T

==== B4204T3 ====
The B4204T3 is a 1.9 L (1,948 cc) straight-four. With a compression ratio of 9.0:1, Bore is 83 mm (3.3 in) and stroke is 90 mm (3.5 in). It is turbocharged and intercooled with a power output of 165 PS (121 kW; 163 hp) at 5250 rpm with 240 N⋅m (180 lb⋅ft) of torque at 1800–4500 rpm. It features variable valve timing (VVT).

Applications:

- 2000–2003 Volvo S40 badged as S40 2.0T
- 2000–2003 Volvo V40 badged as V40 2.0T

==== B4204T4 ====
The B4204T4 is a 1.9 L (1,948 cc) straight-four. Bore is 83 mm (3.3 in) and stroke is 90 mm (3.5 in). It is turbocharged and intercooled with a power output of 172 PS (127 kW; 170 hp) at 5500 rpm with 240 N⋅m (180 lb⋅ft) of torque at 1800–5000 rpm. It is equipped with a TD04 12T turbocharger.

Applications:

- 2003–2004 Volvo S40 badged as S40 2.0T
- 2003–2004 Volvo V40 badged as V40 2.0T

==== B4204T5 ====
The B4204T5 is a 1.9 L (1,948 cc) straight-four. with a compression ratio of 8.5:1, Bore is 83 mm (3.3 in) and stroke is 90 mm (3.5 in). It is turbocharged with the TD04L-15T turbocharger and intercooled with a power output of 200 PS (147 kW; 197 hp) at 5500 rpm with 300 N⋅m (220 lb⋅ft) of torque at 2500–4000 rpm. It features variable valve timing (VVT).

For the B4204T6 and T7, see Ford EcoBoost.

Applications:

- 2001–2003 Volvo S40 badged as S40 T4
- 2001–2003 Volvo V40 badged as V40 T4

== Five-cylinder engines (B5) ==
=== B5202/5204 (2.0) ===
==== B5202S ====
The B5202S is a 2.0 L (1,984 cc) straight-five. Bore is 81 mm (3.2 in) and stroke is 77 mm (3.0 in) with a compression ratio of 10.0:1. It is naturally aspirated with a power output of 126 PS (93 kW; 124 hp) at 6250 rpm and produces 170 N⋅m (125 lb⋅ft) of torque at 4800 rpm. It is equipped with Siemens Fenix 5.2 engine management.

Applications:

- 1997–1998 Volvo S70
- 1997–1999 Volvo V70

==== B5202FS ====
The B5202FS is a 2.0 L (1,984 cc) straight-five. Bore is 81 mm (3.2 in) and stroke is 77 mm (3.0 in) with a compression ratio of 10.0:1. It is naturally aspirated with a power output of 126 PS (93 kW; 124 hp) at 6250 rpm and produces 170 N⋅m (125 lb⋅ft) of torque at 4800 rpm. It is equipped with Siemens Fenix 5.2 engine management.

Applications:

- 1995–1997 Volvo 850 badged as 850 2.0 or 850 2.0_10V
- 1997–1999 Volvo S70 badged as S70 2.0
- 1997–1999 Volvo V70 badged as V70 2.0

==== B5204S ====
The B5204S is a 2.0 L (1,984 cc) straight-five. Bore is 81 mm (3.2 in) and stroke is 77 mm (3.0 in). It is naturally aspirated.

Applications:

- 1992–1994 Volvo 850

==== B5204FS ====
The B5204FS is a 2.0 L (1,984 cc) straight-five. Compression ratio of 10.3:1. It is naturally aspirated with a power output of 143 PS (105 kW; 141 hp) at 6500 rpm with 176 N⋅m (130 lb⋅ft) of torque at 3800 rpm. It is equipped with Bosch LH-3.2/EZ-129K engine management.

Applications:

- 1992–1996 Volvo 850 badged as 850

==== B5204FT ====
The B5204FT is a 2.0 L (1,984 cc) straight-five. It is turbocharged and intercooled.

Applications:

- 1994–1997 Volvo 850 badged as 850 2.0T

==== B5204T ====
The B5204T is a 2.0 L (1,984 cc) straight-five. Bore is 81 mm (3.2 in) and stroke is 77 mm (3.0 in) with a compression ratio of 8.4:1. It is turbocharged and intercooled with a power output of 210 PS (154 kW; 207 hp), and produces 300 N⋅m (221 lb⋅ft) of torque. It is equipped with Bosch Motronic 4.3 engine management. It was offered only in Italy, Taiwan and Iceland, due to local tax laws.

Applications:

- 1994–1997 Volvo 850 badged as 850 T-5 (2.0)

==== B5204T2 ====
The B5204T2 is a 2.0 L (1,984 cc) straight-five. Bore is 81 mm (3.2 in) and stroke is 77 mm (3.0 in) with a compression ratio of 8.4:1. It is turbocharged and intercooled with a power output of 211 PS (155 kW; 208 hp) at 5700 rpm, and produces 220 N⋅m (162 lb⋅ft) of torque at 2100–5400 rpm. It is equipped with Bosch Motronic 4.4 engine management.

Applications:

- 1997–1998 Volvo S70 badged as S70 2.0T
- 1997–1998 Volvo V70 badged as V70 2.0T

==== B5204T3 ====
The B5204T3 is a 2.0 L (1,984 cc) straight-five. Bore is 81 mm (3.2 in) and stroke is 77 mm (3.0 in) with a compression ratio of 8.4:1. It is turbocharged and intercooled with a power output of 225 PS (165 kW; 222 hp) at 5700 rpm and 310 N⋅m (229 lb⋅ft) of torque at 2700–5100 rpm. It is equipped with Bosch Motronic 4.4 engine management for model years 1997 and 1998. It is equipped with Bosch ME7 for model years 1999 and 2000. It was only offered in Italy, Portugal, and Taiwan, due to high taxes on cars with more than 2000 cc engine capacity, and also in Norway.

Applications:

- 1997–2000 Volvo S70 badged as S70 T5
- 1997–2000 Volvo V70 badged as V70 T5
- 1998–2002 Volvo C70 badged as C70 T5
- 1999–2000 Volvo S80 badged as S80 T5

==== B5204T4 ====
The B5204T4 is a 2.0 L (1,984 cc) straight-five. Bore is 81 mm (3.2 in) and stroke is 77 mm (3.0 in) with a compression ratio of 9.5:1. It is turbocharged and intercooled with a power output of 163 PS (120 kW; 161 hp) at 5100 rpm, and produces 230 N⋅m (170 lb⋅ft) of torque at 1800–5000 rpm.

Applications:

- 1999–2000 Volvo S80 badged as S80 2.0T
- 2000–2005 Volvo C70 badged as C70 2.0T (convertible)
- 2000–2002 Volvo C70 badged as C70 2.0T (coupé)
- 1999 Volvo V70 badged as V70 2.0T

==== B5204T5 ====
The B5204T5 is a 2.0 L (1,984 cc) straight-five. Bore is 81 mm (3.2 in) and stroke is 77 mm (3.0 in) with a compression ratio of 9.5:1. It is turbocharged and intercooled with a power output of 180 PS (132 kW; 178 hp) at 5300 rpm, and produces 240 N⋅m (180 lb⋅ft) of torque at 2000–5300 rpm.

Applications:

- 2000–2006 Volvo S80 badged as S80 2.0T
- 2001–2009 Volvo S60 badged as S60 2.0T
- 2000–2007 Volvo V70 II badged as V70 2.0T

==== B5204T8 ====
The B5204T8 is a 2.0 L (1,984 cc) straight-five. Bore is 81 mm (3.2 in) and stroke is 77 mm (3.0 in) with a compression ratio of 10.5:1. It is turbocharged and intercooled with a power output of 180 PS (132 kW; 178 hp) at 5000 rpm, and produces 300 N⋅m (221 lb⋅ft) of torque at 2700–4200 rpm.

Applications:

- 2012–2015 Volvo V40 II badged as V40 T4
- 2013–2014 Volvo S60 II badged as S60 T4
- 2013 Volvo V60 badged as V60 T4

==== B5204T9 ====
The B5204T9 is a 2.0 L (1,984 cc) straight-five. Bore is 81 mm (3.2 in) and stroke is 77 mm (3.0 in) with a compression ratio of 10.5:1. It is turbocharged and intercooled with a power output of 213 PS (157 kW; 210 hp) at 6000 rpm, and produces 300 N⋅m (221 lb⋅ft) of torque at 2700–5000 rpm.

Applications:

- 2012–2015 Volvo V40 II badged as V40 (Thailand)
- 2013–2014 Volvo V40 II badged as V40 T5 R Design or V40 Cross Country T5 AWD (Japan)
- 2013–2014 Volvo S60 II badged as S60 T5
- 2013–2014 Volvo V60 badged as V60 T5
- 2013–2015 Volvo S80 II badged as Volvo S80L T5

=== B5234 (2.3) ===
==== B5234FS ====
The B5234FS is a 2.3 L (2,319 cc) straight-five. It is naturally aspirated and was only available on Thai market cars.

Applications:

- 1994–1996 Volvo 850 Volvo S70

==== B5234T ====
The B5234T is a 2.3 L (2,319 cc) straight-five. It is turbocharged and intercooled with a power output of 225 PS (165 kW; 222 hp) at 5200 rpm and 300 N⋅m (221 lb⋅ft) of torque between 2000 and 5200 rpm. It is equipped with Bosch Motronic 4.3 engine management.

Applications:

- 1993–1996 Volvo 850 badged as 850 T-5 or 850 Turbo.

==== B5234T2 ====
The B5234T2 is a 2.3 L (2,319 cc) straight-five. Bore is 81 mm (3.2 in) and stroke is 90 mm (3.5 in) with a compression ratio of 8.5:1. It is turbocharged and intercooled with a power output of 218 PS (160 kW; 215 hp) at 5100 rpm and 330 N⋅m (243 lb⋅ft) of torque at 2700–4500 rpm. It was only available on Thailand market cars.

Applications:

- 1997 Volvo 850
- 1997–1998 Volvo S70
- 1997–1998 Volvo V70

==== B5234T3 ====
The B5234T3 is a 2.3 L (2,319 cc) straight-five. Bore is 81 mm (3.2 in) and stroke is 90 mm (3.5 in) with a compression ratio of 8.5:1. It is equipped with a Mitsubishi TD04HL-16T turbocharger and intercooled with a power output of 240 PS (176 kW; 236 hp) at 5100 rpm and 330 N⋅m (240 lb⋅ft) of torque at 2400–5100 rpm. Model years 1997 and 1998 are equipped with Bosch Motronic 4.4 engine management, model years 1999 and up are equipped with Bosch ME7 engine management. Also added for the 1999 model year was variable valve timing for the exhaust cam. For model year 2001 and up power output was increased to 250 PS (184 kW; 247 hp) at 5200 rpm with 330 N⋅m (240 lb⋅ft) of torque at 2400–5200 rpm.

Applications:

- 1997–2000 Volvo S70 badged as S70 T5
- 1998 Volvo S70 badged as S70 R (Note: Models with automatic transmission)
- 1997–2000 Volvo V70 badged as V70 T5
- 1998 Volvo V70 badged as V70 R (Note: Models with automatic transmission)
- 1998–2002 Volvo C70 badged as C70 T5 (convertible)
- 1997–2002 Volvo C70 badged as C70 T5 (coupé)
- 2000–2004 Volvo V70 II badged as V70 T5
- 2001–2004 Volvo S60 badged as S60 T5

==== B5234T4 ====
The B5234T4 is a 2.3 L (2,319 cc) straight-five. Bore is 81 mm (3.2 in) and stroke is 90 mm (3.5 in) with a compression ratio of 8.5:1. It is turbocharged and intercooled with a power output of 250 PS (184 kW; 247 hp) at 6000 rpm and 350 N⋅m (260 lb⋅ft) of torque at 2400–5000 rpm. It is equipped with Bosch Motronic 4.3 engine management. The 850 R models come with a TD04HL-16T turbo, S70 R and V70 R models come with a TD04HL-18T turbo.

Applications:

- 1996–1997 Volvo 850 badged as 850 R (Note: Models with manual transmission)
- 1998 Volvo S70 badged as S70 R (Note: Models with manual transmission)
- 1998 Volvo V70 badged as V70 R and V70 R AWD (Note: Models with manual transmission)

==== B5234T5 ====
The B5234T5, sometimes also referred to as B5234FT5, is a 2.3 L (2,319 cc) straight-five. It is turbocharged and intercooled.
The T-5R has two different ratings for the power output: 225 PS (165 kW; 222 hp) at 5600 rpm under normal conditions and 240 PS (177 kW; 237 hp) at 5600 rpm with overboost. It provides 330 N⋅m (240 lb⋅ft) of torque at 3000–4800 rpm on cars with a manual transmission and 300 N⋅m (220 lb⋅ft) of torque at 2000–5600 rpm on cars with an automatic transmission. The R has a power output of 250 PS (184 kW; 247 hp) at 5400rpm and 350 N⋅m (258 lb.ft). It is equipped with Bosch Motronic 4.3 engine management.

Applications:

- 1995 Volvo 850 badged as 850 T-5R (U.S.)
- 1995–1996 Volvo 850 badged as 850 T-5R (ROW)
- 1996–1997 Volvo 850 badged as 850 R (Note: Models with automatic transmission)

==== B5234T6 ====
The B5234T6 is a 2.3 L (2,319 cc) straight-five. Bore is 81 mm (3.2 in) and stroke is 90 mm (3.5 in) with a compression ratio of 8.5:1. It is turbocharged and intercooled with a power output of 240 PS (177 kW; 237 hp) at 6000 rpm and 310 N⋅m (230 lb⋅ft) of torque at 2700–5400 rpm. It is equipped with Bosch Motronic 4.4 engine management.

Applications:

- 1998 Volvo V70 badged as V70 R AWD (Note: Models with automatic transmission)

==== B5234T7 ====
The B5234T7 is a 2.3 L (2,319 cc) straight-five. Bore is 81 mm (3.2 in) and stroke is 90 mm (3.5 in) with a compression ratio of 8.5:1. It is turbocharged and intercooled with a power output of 200 PS (147 kW; 197 hp) at 5000 rpm and 285 N⋅m (210 lb⋅ft) of torque at 2000–5000 rpm. It is equipped with Bosch ME7 engine management.

Applications:

- 1998–2000 Volvo S70 badged as .
- 1998–2000 Volvo V70 badged as .
- 2000–2004 Volvo S80 badged as S80 2.3T
- 2001–2004 Volvo S60 badged as S60 2.3T

==== B5234T8 ====
The B5234T8 is a 2.3 L (2,319 cc) straight-five. Bore is 81 mm (3.2 in) and stroke is 90 mm (3.5 in) with a compression ratio of 8.5:1. It is turbocharged and intercooled with a power output of 250 PS (184 kW; 247 hp) at 5700 rpm and 310 N⋅m (230 lb⋅ft) of torque at 2700–5100 rpm. It is equipped with Bosch ME7 engine management.

Applications:

- 1999 Volvo V70 badged as V70 R AWD

==== B5234T9 ====
The B5234T9 is a 2.3 L (2,319 cc) straight-five. Bore is 81 mm (3.2 in) and stroke is 90 mm (3.5 in) with a compression ratio of 8.5:1. It is turbocharged and intercooled with a power output of 245 PS (180 kW; 242 hp) at 5400 rpm and 330 N⋅m (240 lb⋅ft) of torque at 2400–5100 rpm. It is equipped with Bosch ME7 engine management.

Applications:

- 2003–2005 Volvo C70 badged as C70 T5 (convertible)

=== B5244 (2.4) ===
==== B5244S ====
The B5244S is a 2.4 L (2,435 cc) straight-five with a compression ratio of 10.3:1. This engine is naturally aspirated and was offered in two versions with different power levels:

A detuned version with a power output of 144 PS (106 kW; 142 hp) at 5400 rpm with 152 lb⋅ft (206 N⋅m) of torque at 3600 rpm.
An uprated version with a power output of 170 PS (125 kW; 168 hp) at 5700 rpm, with 170 lb⋅ft (230 N⋅m) of torque at 4500 rpm. From model year 2000 on the engine was equipped with intake cam VVT.

Applications:

- 2000 Volvo S70 badged as S70 2.4
- 2000 Volvo V70 badged as V70 2.4
- 2001–2009 Volvo S60 badged as S60 2.4
- 2001–2007 Volvo V70 II badged as V70 2.4
- 1999–2006 Volvo S80 badged as S80 2.4

==== B5244S2 ====
The B5244S2 is a 2.4 L (2,435 cc) straight-five. It is naturally aspirated with a power output of 140 PS (103 kW; 138 hp) at 5700 rpm with 220 N⋅m (160 lb⋅ft) of torque at 3750 rpm. It features intake cam VVT.

Applications:

- 1999–2006 Volvo S80 badged as S80
- 2000 Volvo S70 badged as S70 2.4
- 2000–2007 Volvo V70 badged as V70
- 2001–2009 Volvo S60 badged as S60

==== B5244S4 ====
The B5244S4 is a 2.4 L (2,435 cc) straight-five. Bore is 83 mm (3.3 in) and stroke is 90 mm (3.5 in) with a compression ratio of 10.3:1. It is naturally aspirated with a power output of 170 PS (125 kW; 168 hp) at 6000 rpm with 230 N⋅m (170 lb⋅ft) of torque at 4400 rpm. It features intake cam VVT.

Applications:

- 2004–2010 Volvo S40 II badged as S40 2.4i
- 2004–2010 Volvo V50 badged as V50 2.4i
- 2007–2010 Volvo C30 badged as C30 2.4i
- 2006–2010 Volvo C70 II badged as C70 2.4i

==== B5244S5 ====
The B5244S5 is a 2.4 L (2,435 cc) straight-five. Bore is 83 mm (3.3 in) and stroke is 90 mm (3.5 in) with a compression ratio of 10.3:1. It is naturally aspirated with a power output of 140 PS (103 kW; 138 hp) at 5000 rpm with 220 N⋅m (160 lb⋅ft) of torque at 4000 rpm.

Applications:

- 2004–2010 Volvo S40 II badged as S40 2.4
- 2004–2010 Volvo V50 badged as V50 2.4
- 2006–2010 Volvo C70 II badged as C70 2.4

==== B5244S6 ====
SULEV+ engine variant for California.

==== B5244S7 ====
SULEV+ engine variant with PremAir for California.

Applications:

- S40 II

==== B5244SG ====
The B5244SG is a 2.4 L (2,435 cc) straight-five. Bore is 83 mm (3.3 in) and stroke is 90 mm (3.5 in) with a compression ratio of 10.3:1. It is naturally aspirated with a power output of 140 PS (103 kW; 138 hp) at 4500 rpm with 220 N⋅m (160 lb⋅ft) of torque at 3750 rpm when using petrol; and 140 PS (103 kW; 138 hp) at 5800 rpm with 192 N⋅m (142 lb⋅ft) of torque at 4500 rpm when using natural gas. This particular engine is a Bi-Fuel variant that is optimized for CNG.

Applications:

- 2001–2006 Volvo S80 badged as S80 Bi-Fuel
- 2002–2008 Volvo S60 badged as S60 Bi-Fuel
- 2000 Volvo V70 badged as V70 Bi-Fuel
- 2001–2008 Volvo V70 II badged as V70 Bi-Fuel

==== B5244SG2 ====
The B5244SG2 is a 2.4 L (2,435 cc) straight-five. Bore is 83 mm (3.3 in) and stroke 90 mm (3.5 in) is with a compression ratio of 10.3:1. It is naturally aspirated with a power output of 140 PS (103 kW; 138 hp) at 4500 rpm with 220 N⋅m (160 lb⋅ft) of torque at 3750 rpm when using petrol; and 140 PS (103 kW; 138 hp) at 5100 rpm with 214 N⋅m (158 lb⋅ft) of torque at 4500 rpm when using LPG. This particular engine is a Bi-Fuel variant that is optimized for LPG.

Applications:

- 2001–2005 Volvo S80 badged as S80 Bi-Fuel
- 2002–2005 Volvo S60 badged as S60 Bi-Fuel
- 2000 Volvo V70 and S70 badged as V70 (or S70) Bi-Fuel
- 2002–2005 Volvo V70 II badged as V70 Bi-Fuel

==== B5244T ====
The B5244T is a 2.4 L (2,435 cc) straight-five. Bore is 83 mm (3.3 in) and stroke is 90 mm (3.5 in) with a compression ratio of 9:1. It is turbocharged and intercooled with a power output of 193 PS (142 kW; 190 hp) at 5100 rpm with 270 N⋅m (200 lb⋅ft) of torque between 1600 and 5000 rpm. It is equipped with Bosch ME7 engine management. The B5244T was also the most common engine used in Volvo police vehicles of that era. Mainly in the 2000 Volvo V70 & V70 XC.

Applications:

- 1999–2000 Volvo S70 badged as S70 2.4T or S70 2.4T AWD
- 1999–2000 Volvo V70 badged as V70 2.4T or V70 2.4T AWD
- 1999–2000 Volvo V70 XC badged as V70 XC 2.4T AWD
- 2000–2002 Volvo C70 badged as C70 2.4T (convertible)
- 2000–2002 Volvo C70 badged as C70 2.4T (coupé)

==== B5244T2 ====
The B5244T2 is a 2.4 L (2,435 cc) straight-five. Bore is 83 mm (3.3 in) and stroke is 90 mm (3.5 in) with a compression ratio of 8.5:1 (Dutch owners manual says it is 9.0:1). It is turbocharged and intercooled with a power output of 265 PS (195 kW; 261 hp) at 5700 rpm with 350 N⋅m (258 lb⋅ft) of torque at 2400 rpm. It is equipped with Bosch ME7 engine management.
It was available with the 4 speed and 5-speed AW50/51AWD automatic transmissions.

Applications:

- 2000 Volvo V70 badged as V70 R AWD

==== B5244T3 ====
The B5244T3 is a 2.4 L (2,435 cc) straight-five. Bore is 83 mm (3.3 in) and stroke is 90 mm (3.5 in) with a compression ratio of 9:1. It is equipped with a Mitsubishi TD04HL-13T turbocharger and intercooled with a power output of 200 PS (147 kW; 197 hp) at 6000 rpm with 285 N⋅m (210 lb⋅ft) of torque at 1800-5000 rpm. It features exhaust cam VVT.

Applications:

- 2001–2003 Volvo S80 badged as S80 2.4T
- 2001–2003 Volvo S60 badged as S60 2.4T
- 2000–2003 Volvo V70 II badged as V70 2.4T
- 2001–2002 Volvo V70 XC II badged as V70 XC 2.4T AWD

==== B5244T4 ====
The B5244T4 is a 2.4 L (2,401 cc) straight-five For the Thai and Malaysian markets. Bore is 81 mm (3.2 in) and stroke is 93.2 mm (3.7 in). It is turbocharged and intercooled with a power output of 220 PS (162 kW; 217 hp) at 5000 rpm with 285 N⋅m (210 lb⋅ft) of torque at 1500 rpm. It features VVT for both the intake and exhaust cams.

Applications:

- 2005–2006 Volvo S60 badged as S60 2.4T
- 2005 Volvo V70 II badged as V70 2.4T
- 2005–2006 Volvo XC70 badged as XC70 2.4T AWD

==== B5244T5 ====
The B5244T5 is a 2.4 L (2,401 cc) straight-five. Bore is 81 mm (3.2 in) and stroke is 93.2 mm (3.7 in) with a compression ratio of 8.5:1. It is turbocharged and intercooled with a power output of 260 PS (191 kW; 256 hp) at 5500 rpm with 350 N⋅m (260 lb⋅ft) of torque at 2100 rpm. It features VVT for both intake and exhaust cam. It is equipped with a BorgWarner K24-7400 turbocharger.

This engine is known for being a plug and play substitute for the B5254T4 engine, which had problems with cracked cylinder liners.

Applications:

- 2005–2009 Volvo S60 badged as S60 T5
- 2005–2007 Volvo V70 II badged as V70 T5

==== B5244T7 ====
The B5244T7 2.4 L (2,435 cc) straight-five. Bore is 83 mm (3.3 in) and stroke is 90 mm (3.5 in) with a compression ratio of 9.0:1. It is turbocharged and intercooled with a power output of 200 PS (147 kW; 197 hp) at 5700 rpm with 285 N⋅m (210 lb⋅ft) of torque between 1800 and 5000 rpm. It features VVT for exhaust cam. It is equipped with Bosch ME7 engine management.

Applications:

- 2003–2005 Volvo C70 badged as C70 2.4T (convertible)

=== B5252/5254 (2.4/2.5) ===
==== B5252S ====
The B5252S is a 2.4 L (2,435 cc) straight-five. Bore is 83 mm (3.3 in) and stroke is 90 mm (3.5 in) with a compression ratio of 10.0:1. It is naturally aspirated with a power output of 144 hp at 5400 rpm with 206 N⋅m (152 lb⋅ft) of torque at 3600 rpm. It is equipped with Siemens Fenix 5.2 engine management.

Applications:

- 1996 Volvo 850 badged as 850 2.4_10V or 850 2.5i
- 1997–1998 Volvo S70 and Volvo V70

==== B5252FS ====
The B5252FS is a 2.4 L (2,435 cc) straight-five. It is naturally aspirated and it is equipped with Siemens Fenix 5.2 engine management.

Applications:

- 1993–1997 Volvo 850
- 1997–1999 Volvo S70
- 1997–1999 Volvo V70

==== GB5252S ====
The GB5252S is a 2.4 L (2,435 cc) straight-five. Bore is 83 mm (3.3 in) and stroke is 90 mm (3.5 in) with a compression ratio of 10.0:1. It is naturally aspirated with a power output of 144 PS (106 kW; 142 hp) at 5400 rpm with 206 N⋅m (152 lb⋅ft) of torque at 3600 rpm when using petrol; and a power output of 122 PS (90 kW; 120 hp) at 5250 rpm with 180 N⋅m (130 lb⋅ft) of torque at 3650 rpm when using natural gas. It is equipped with Siemens Fenix 5.2 engine management for petrol operation and Necam MEGA for natural gas operation.

This engine was only available with the 4-speed AW50-42LE automatic with three shift modes.

Applications:

- 1996–1997 Volvo 850 badged as 850 Bi-Fuel
- 1997–1998 Volvo S70 badged as S70 Bi-Fuel
- 1997–1998 Volvo V70 badged as V70 Bi-Fuel

==== GB5252S2 ====
The GB5252S2 is a 2.4 L (2,435 cc) straight-five. Bore is 83 mm (3.3 in) and stroke is 90 mm (3.5 in) with a compression ratio of 10.0:1. It is naturally aspirated with a power output of 144 PS (106 kW; 142 hp) at 5400 rpm with 206 N⋅m (152 lb⋅ft) of torque at 3600 rpm when using petrol; and a power output of 122 PS (90 kW; 120 hp) at 5250 rpm with 180 N⋅m (130 lb⋅ft) of torque at 3650 rpm when using natural gas. It is equipped with Siemens Fenix 5.2 engine management for petrol operation and Necam MEGA for natural gas operation. This engine was only available with the 4-speed AW50-42LE automatic with adaptive shift logic.

Applications:

- 1999 Volvo S70 badged as S70 Bi-Fuel
- 1999 Volvo V70 badged as V70 Bi-Fuel

==== B5254F ====
The B5254F is a 2.4 L (2,435 cc) straight-five. It is naturally aspirated with a power output of 170 PS (125 kW; 168 hp) at 6100 rpm with 220 N⋅m (162 lb⋅ft) of torque at 4700 rpm. It is equipped with Bosch LH-3.2/EZ-129K engine management and features V-VIS.

Applications:

- 1991–1994 Volvo 850

==== B5254FS ====
The B5254FS is a 2.4 L (2,435 cc) straight-five. It has a compression ratio of 10.5:1. It is naturally aspirated with a power output of 170 PS (125 kW; 168 hp) with 220 N⋅m (162 lb⋅ft) of torque at 3300 rpm. It is equipped with Bosch LH-3.2/EZ-129K engine management and features V-VIS. This was also used by Renault for their Safrane, in which application it was codenamed N7U.

Applications:

- 1995 Volvo 850
- 1997–1999 Volvo S70
- 1996–1998 Renault Safrane badged as Safrane 2.5 or Safrane 2.5 or Safrane 2.4 20V

==== B5254S ====
The B5254S, sometimes referred to as B5254S LH 3.2 or B5254S M4.4, is a 2.4 L (2,435 cc) straight-five. It is naturally aspirated with a power output of 170 PS (125 kW; 168 hp) at 6100 rpm with 220 N⋅m (162 lb⋅ft) of torque at 4700 rpm. It is equipped with Bosch LH-3.2/EZ-129K engine management and features V-VIS for model years 1995 and 1996. From model year 1997 on it is equipped with Bosch Motronic 4.4 engine management.

Applications:

- 1995–1997 Volvo 850 badged as 850 2.5-20_V, 850 2.5 20V or 850 GLT
- 1997–1999 Volvo S70 badged as S70 2.5 20V
- 1999 Volvo V70 badged as V70 2.5 20V
- 1999 Volvo C70 badged as C70 2.5 20V (coupé)

==== B5254T ====
The B5254T is a 2.4 L (2,435 cc) straight-five. It is turbocharged and intercooled with a power output 193 PS (142 kW; 190 hp) at 5100 rpm, with 270 N⋅m (200 lb⋅ft) of torque at 1800–5000 rpm. Compression ratio is 9.0:1. It is equipped with Bosch Motronic 4.4 engine management for model years 1997 and 1998. It is equipped with Bosch ME7 engine management for model year 1999. Boost pressure is limited to 6 psi (41.3685 kPa).

Applications:

- 1997 Volvo 850 badged as 850 AWD or 850 2.5T
- 1997–1999 Volvo S70 badged as S70 2.5T or S70 AWD
- 1997–1999 Volvo V70 badged as V70 2.5T, V70 AWD or V70 2.5T AWD
- 1998–1999 Volvo V70 XC badged as V70 XC AWD or V70 XC 2.5T AWD or V70 GLT
- 1998–1999 Volvo C70 badged as C70 2.5T (convertible)
- 1998–1999 Volvo C70 badged as C70 2.5T (coupé)

==== B5254T2 ====
The B5254T2 is a 2.5 L (2,522 cc) straight-five. Bore is 83 mm (3.3 in) and stroke is 93.2 mm (3.7 in) with a compression ratio of 9.0:1. It is equipped with a Mitsubishi TD04L-14T turbocharger and intercooled with a power output of 210 PS (154 kW; 207 hp) at 5000 rpm with 320 N⋅m (240 lb⋅ft) of torque at 1500–4500 rpm.

Applications:

- 2003–2009 Volvo S60 badged as S60 2.5T or S60 2.5T AWD
- 2003–2008 Volvo V70 II badged as V70 2.5T or V70 2.5T AWD
- 2003–2007 Volvo XC70 badged as XC70 2.5T AWD
- 2003–2006 Volvo S80 badged as S80 2.5T
- 2003–2012 Volvo XC90 badged as XC90 2.5T AWD

==== B5254T3 ====
The B5254T3 is a 2.5 L (2,522 cc) straight-five. Bore is 83 mm (3.3 in) and stroke is 93.2 mm (3.7 in) with a compression ratio of 9.0:1. It is turbocharged and intercooled with a power output of 220 PS (162 kW; 217 hp) at 5000 rpm with 320 N⋅m (240 lb⋅ft) of torque at 1500–4800 rpm. On cars with the AW55-51 automatic transmission, torque is limited in first and second gear. It has CVVT and is equipped with Bosch ME 9.0 engine management system. Unlike previous designs, the turbocharger is integral with the exhaust manifold.

Adaptations of this engine were used by Ford, with power levels ranging from 220 PS (217 bhp) to 350PS (345 bhp). At Ford the engine was called "Duratec-ST", "Duratec ST" or "Duratec RS".

Applications:

- 2005–2008 Volvo S40 II badged as S40 T5
- 2005–2008 Volvo V50 badged as V50 T5
- 2007 Volvo C30 badged as C30 T5
- 2006–2007 Volvo C70 badged as C70 T5
- 2005–2011 Ford Focus badged as Focus ST
- 2007–2010 Ford Mondeo Mk4 badged as XR5 Turbo for the Australian market.
- 2007–2010 Ford S-Max
- 2009–2010 Ford Focus badged as Focus RS The engines as configured for the Ford Focus RS Mk. 2 and RS500 were not used in any Volvo model. They can be described as a RNC version of the S60R/V70R B5254T4 engine. Lower compression (different pistons), stronger connecting rods, and same geometry camshafts as B5254T4 but different (dual) VVT units. These engines use a slightly larger Borg-Warner K16 turbo, the K16 turbo is an integrated manifold turbocharger, but it does not outperform the K24 used on the B5254T4 S60R/V70R engine.
- 2011 Ford Focus badged as Focus RS 500
- 2008–2012 Ford Kuga badged as Kuga 2.5T 2008–2010 Euro 4, 2011–2012 Euro 5. Australian delivered Kuga received the B5254T6 motor from 2008 to 2011.

==== B5254T4 ====
The B5254T4 is a 2.5 L (2,522 cc) straight-five. Bore is 83 mm (3.3 in) and stroke is 93.2 mm (3.7 in) with a compression ratio of 8.5:1. It is turbocharged and intercooled and equipped with dual VVT. It produces 300 PS (221 kW; 296 hp) at 5500 rpm with 400 N⋅m (295 lb⋅ft) of torque at 2000–5250 rpm with the 6-speed manual transmission (Note: Volvo M66C AWD transmission); 300 PS (221 kW; 296 hp) at 6000 rpm with 350 N⋅m (258 lb⋅ft) of torque at 1850–6000 rpm with the 5-speed automatic transmission (Note: Aisin AW55-51 transmission). Cars with the 6–speed automatic transmission (Note: Aisin TF 80-SC AWD transmission) were not torque limited.

It is equipped with a BorgWarner K24 turbocharger.

Applications:

- 2004–2007 Volvo S60 badged as S60 R AWD
- 2004–2007 Volvo V70 II badged as V70 R AWD

==== B5254T5 ====
The B5254T5 is a 2.5 L (2,522 cc) straight-five. It is turbocharged and intercooled with a power output of 250 PS (184 kW; 247 hp) at 5500 rpm with 360 N⋅m (266 lb⋅ft) of torque between 1800 and 4200 rpm.

Applications:

- 2011–2012 Volvo S60 II badged as S60 T5

==== B5254T6 ====
The B5254T6 is a 2.5 L (2,522 cc) straight-five. Bore is 83 mm (3.3 in) and stroke is 93.2 mm (3.7 in) with a compression ratio of 9.0:1. It is turbocharged and intercooled with a power output of 200 PS (147 kW; 197 hp) at 4800 rpm with 300 N⋅m (221 lb⋅ft) of torque at 1500–4500 rpm. (220 PS and 320 Nm in the Ford Mondeo and S-max)

Applications:

- 2007–2009 Volvo S80 II badged as S80 2.5T
- 2008–2009 Volvo V70 III badged as V70 2.5T or V70 2.5T AWD
- 2006–2010 Ford S-Max badged as S-Max 2.5T
- 2007–2010 Ford Mondeo badged as Mondeo 2.5T or Mondeo XR5 Turbo in Australia

Not in Australian Mondeo xr5. That received the B5254T3 VVT engine same as the focus xr5.

==== B5254T7 ====
The B5254T7 is 2.5 L (2,522 cc) straight-five. Bore is 83 mm (3.3 in) and stroke is 93.2 mm (3.7 in) with a compression ratio of 9.0:1. It is turbocharged and intercooled with a power output of 230 PS (169 kW; 227 hp) at 5000 rpm with 320 N⋅m (240 lb⋅ft) of torque at 1500–5000 rpm. It is equipped with Bosch ME9 engine management. For models with the AW55-51 automatic transmission torque is limited in first and second gear. The turbocharger is still integrated into the exhaust manifold, but is of a different design.

Applications:

- 2008–2012 Volvo S40 II badged as S40 T5
- 2008–2012 Volvo V50 badged as V50 T5
- 2008–2013 Volvo C30 badged as C30 T5
- 2008–2013 Volvo C70 II badged as C70 T5

==== B5254T8 ====
The B5254T8 is a 2.5 L (2,522 cc) straight-five. Bore is 83 mm (3.3 in) and stroke is 93.2 mm (3.7 in) with a compression ratio of 9.0:1. It is turbocharged and intercooled with a power output of 200 PS (147 kW; 197 hp) at 4800 rpm with 300 N⋅m (221 lb⋅ft) of torque at 1500–4500 rpm. (Note: Available only on the Thai market)

Applications:

- 2009–2011 Volvo S80 II badged as S80 2.5FT
- 2009 Volvo V70 III badged as V70 2.5FT'

==== B5254T10 ====
The B5254T10 is a 2.5 L (2,521 cc) straight-five. Bore is 83 mm (3.3 in) and stroke is 93.2 mm (3.7 in) with a compression ratio of 9.0:1. It is turbocharged and intercooled with a power output of 231 PS (170 kW; 228 hp) at 4800 rpm with 340 N⋅m (251 lb⋅ft) of torque at 1700–4800 rpm.

Applications:

- 2010–2012 Volvo S80 II badged as S80 2.5T
- 2010–2012 Volvo V70 III badged as V70 2.5T

==== B5254T11 ====
The B5254T11 is a 2.5 L (2,521 cc) straight-five. Bore is 83 mm (3.3 in) and stroke is 93.2 mm (3.7 in) with a compression ratio of 9.0:1. It is turbocharged and intercooled with a power output of 231 PS (170 kW; 228 hp) at 4800 rpm with 340 N⋅m (251 lb⋅ft) of torque at 1700–4800 rpm.

Applications:

- 2010–2011 Volvo S80 II badged as S80 2.5FT
- 2010 Volvo V70 III badged as V70 2.5FT

==== B5254T12 ====
The B5254T12 is a 2.5 L (2,497 cc) straight-five. Bore is 83 mm (3.3 in) and stroke is 92.3 mm (3.6 in) with a compression ratio of 9.5:1. It is turbocharged and intercooled with a power output of 254 PS (187 kW; 251 hp) at 5400 rpm with 360 N⋅m (266 lb⋅ft) of torque at 1800–4800 rpm. The TF-80SD and TF-80SC transmissions are available with this engine.

Applications:

- 2013–2015 Volvo V40 II badged as V40 T5
- 2013–2015 Volvo V40CC badged as V40CC T5 AWD
- 2013–2015 Volvo S60 II badged as S60 T5
- 2013–2015 Volvo V60 badged as V60 T5
- 2013–2016 Volvo XC60 badged as XC60 T5 AWD
- 2014–2016 Volvo XC70 II badged as XC70 T5 or XC70 T5 AWD

==== B5254T14 ====
The B5254T14 is a 2.5 L (2,497 cc) straight-five. Bore is 83 mm (3.3 in) and stroke is 92.3 mm (3.6 in) with a compression ratio of 9.5:1. It is turbocharged and intercooled with a power output of 249 PS (183 kW; 246 hp) at 5400 rpm with 360 N⋅m (266 lb⋅ft) of torque at 1800–4200 rpm. The T14 is the final update of the five cylinder engines before it was discontinued entirely for MY 2017.

Applications:

- 2013–2015 Volvo V40 II badged as V40 T5
- 2013–2015 Volvo V40CC badged as V40CC T5
- 2013–2016 Volvo S60 II badged as S60 T5
- 2013–2016 Volvo V60 badged as V60 T5
- 2016 Volvo XC70 II badged as XC70 T5 AWD

== Six-cylinder engines (B6) ==
=== B6244 (2.4) ===
==== B6244FS ====
The B6244FS is a 2.4 L (2,381 cc) straight-six. Bore is 81 mm (3.2 in) and stroke is 77 mm (3.0 in) with a compression ratio of 10.3:1. It is naturally aspirated with a power output of 163 PS (120 kW; 161 hp) at 5800 rpm with 220 N⋅m (160 lb⋅ft) of torque at 4400 rpm.

Applications:

- 1995–1997 Volvo 960 badged as 960 2.4 24V
- 1997–1998 Volvo S90 badged as S90 2.4 24V
- 1997–1998 Volvo V90 badged as V90 2.4 24V

=== B6254 (2.5) ===
==== B6254FS ====
The B6254FS is a 2.5 L (2,473 cc) straight-six. Bore is 81 mm (3.2 in) and stroke is 80 mm (3.1 in) with a compression ratio of 10.5:1. It is naturally aspirated with a power output of 170 PS (125 kW; 168 hp) at 5700 rpm with 230 N⋅m (170 lb⋅ft) of torque at 4400 rpm.

Applications:

- 1995–1997 Volvo 960 badged as 960 2.5 or 960 24V
- 1997–1998 Volvo S90 badged as S90 2.5 or S90 24V
- 1997–1998 Volvo V90 badged as V90 2.5 or V90 24V

==== B6254G ====
Non-catalyst, leaded-fuel compatible version of the B6254S, for regions with limited availability of unleaded fuel.

=== B6284 (2.8) ===
==== B6284T ====
The B6284T is a 2.8 L (2,783 cc) straight-six. Bore is 81 mm (3.2 in) and stroke is 90 mm (3.5 in) with a compression ratio of 8.5:1. It is twin-turbocharged and intercooled with a power output of 272 PS (200 kW; 268 hp) at 5400 rpm, with 380 N⋅m (280 lb⋅ft) of torque at 2000–5000 rpm.

Applications:

- 1999–2002 Volvo S80 badged as S80 T6

=== B6294/6304 (2.9) ===
==== B6294S ====
The B6294S is a 2.9 L (2,922 cc) straight-six. Bore is 83 mm (3.3 in) and stroke is 90 mm (3.5 in) with a compression ratio of 10.3:1. It is naturally aspirated with a power output of 200 PS (147 kW; 197 hp) at 5200 rpm with 280 N⋅m (210 lb⋅ft) of torque at 4200 rpm.

Applications:

- 2003 Volvo S80 badged as S80 2.9

==== B6294S2 ====
The B6294S is a 2.9 L (2,922 cc) straight-six. Bore is 83 mm (3.3 in) and stroke is 90 mm (3.5 in) with a compression ratio of 10.5:1. It is naturally aspirated with a power output of 196 PS (144 kW; 193 hp) at 5200 rpm with 280 N⋅m (210 lb⋅ft) of torque at 3900 rpm.

Applications:

- 2003–2006 Volvo S80 badged as S80 2.9

==== B6294T ====
The B6294T is a 2.9 L (2,922 cc) straight-six. Bore is 83 mm (3.3 in) and stroke is 90 mm (3.5 in) with a compression ratio of 8.5:1. It is twin-turbocharged and intercooled with a power output of 272 PS (200 kW; 268 hp) at 5200 rpm with 380 N⋅m (280 lb⋅ft) of torque at 1800–5000 rpm. It features dual VVT.

Applications:

- 2002–2006 Volvo S80 badged as S80 T6
- 2003–2006 Volvo XC90 badged as XC90 T6

==== B6304S ====
The B6304S is a 2.9 L (2,922 cc) straight-six. Bore is 83 mm (3.3 in) and stroke is 90 mm (3.5 in) with a compression ratio of 10.7:1. It is naturally aspirated with a power output of 204 PS (150 kW; 201 hp) at 5200 rpm with 267 N⋅m (197 lb⋅ft) of torque at 4100 rpm.

Fix problem with two different versions having same engine code but different design(s). Pre MY99 is mechanical throttle, MY99 and onward is with drive by wire. Different power outputs.

Applications:

- 1991–1997 Volvo 960
- 1997–1998 Volvo S90
- 1997–1998 Volvo V90
- 1994–1999 Indigo 3000
- 1999 Volvo S80

==== B6304F1 ====
The B6304F1 is a 2.9 L (2,922 cc) straight-six. Bore is 83 mm (3.3 in) and stroke is 90 mm (3.5 in) with a compression ratio of 10.7:1. It is naturally aspirated with a power output of 204 PS (150 kW; 201 hp) at 6000 rpm with 267 N⋅m (197 lb⋅ft) of torque at 4300 rpm.

Applications:

- 1995–1997 Volvo 960
- 1997–1998 Volvo S90
- 1997–1998 Volvo V90

==== B6304S2 ====
The B6304S2 is a 2.9 L (2,922 cc) straight-six. Engine output was reduced to 180 hp (134 kW; 182 PS) and 199 lb⋅ft (270 N⋅m) by changing the cam profile (back then without variable valve timing) in favour of emissions regulations. Same camshafts as on the B6254S engine were used.

Applications:

- Volvo 960 later model years / various

==== B6304S3 ====
The B6304S3 is a 2.9 L (2,922 cc) straight-six. It has the same bore and stroke (83x90 mm) as the B6294, but the deciliter number was rounded up (i.e. 2,922 cc to 3,000 cc). These engines produced 204 hp (152 kW; 207 PS) at 6000 rpm, and 197 lb⋅ft (267 N⋅m) of torque at 4300 rpm.

Applications:

- 1999 Volvo S80

==== B6304G ====
The B6304G is a 2.9 L (2,922 cc) straight-six. Bore is 83 mm (3.3 in) and stroke is 90 mm (3.5 in) with a compression ratio of 10.7:1. It is naturally aspirated with a power output of 204 PS (150 kW; 201 hp) at 6000 rpm, and 267 N⋅m (197 lb⋅ft) of torque at 4300 rpm. It is adapted to run on leaded gasoline as well as lead free gasoline.

Applications:

- 1997–1998 Volvo S90 badged as S90 3.0 24V
- 1997–1998 Volvo V90 badged as V90 3.0 24V

== See also ==
- List of Volvo engines
