= Volvo C30 =

Swedish compact hatchback

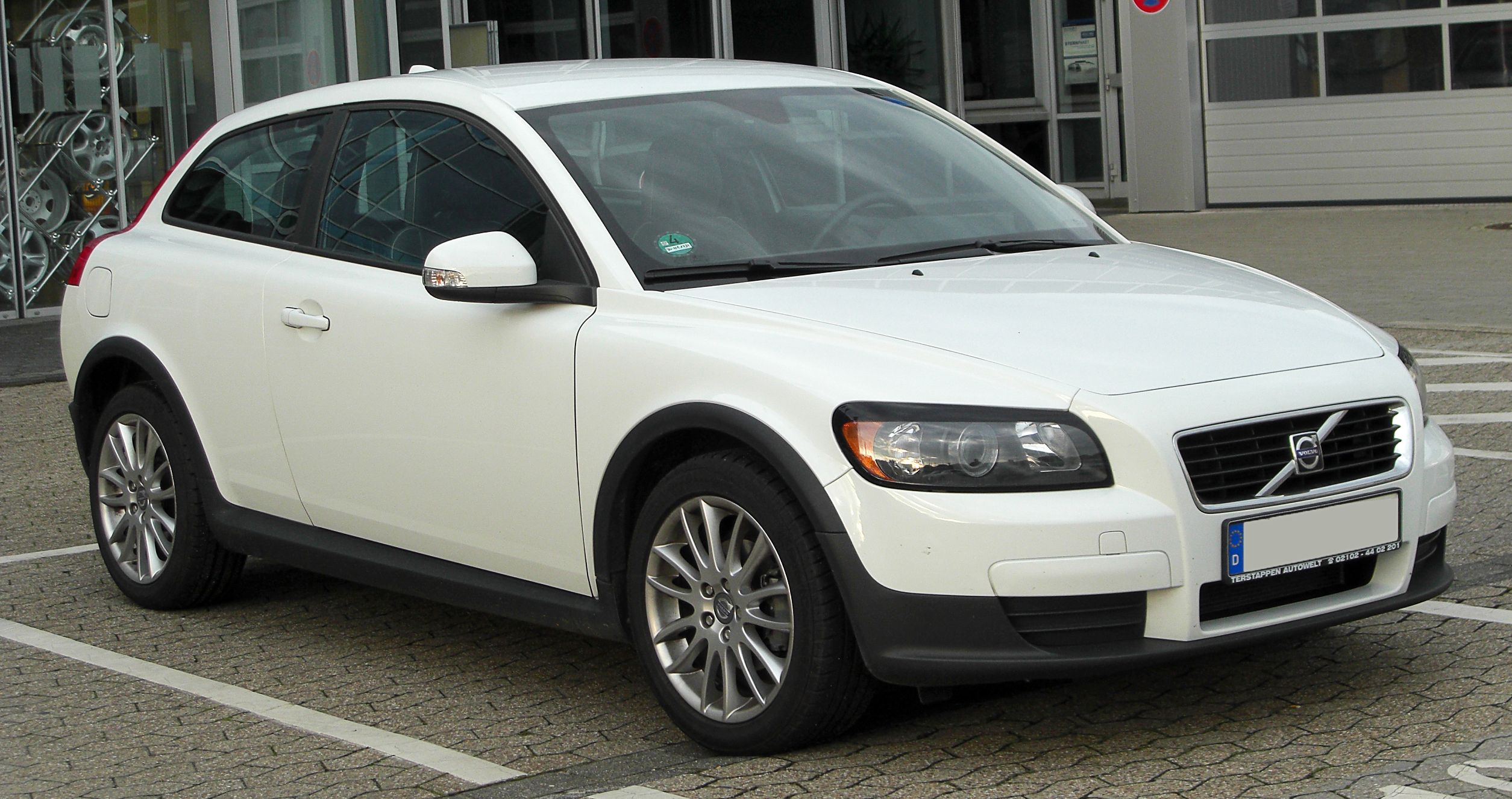

Overview
- Manufacturer: Volvo Cars
- Production: 2006–2013
- Model years: 2007–2013 (Canada); 2008–2013 (US)
- Assembly: Belgium: Ghent (VCG)
- Designer: Simon Lamarre

Body and chassis
- Class: Premium compact/Subcompact executive car (C)
- Body style: 3-door hatchback
- Layout: Front-engine, front-wheel-drive
- Platform: Volvo P1 Platform
- Related: Ford Focus Mk2; Mazda3 (BK); Volvo S40 II; Volvo V50

Powertrain
- Engine: petrol: 1.6 L Ford Duratec I4; 1.8 L Mazda L8-DE I4; 1.8 L Mazda L8-VE I4; 2.4 L B5244S I5; 2.5 L B5254T turbo I5; flexifuel: 2.0 L Mazda LF-DE I4; diesel: 1.6 L Ford/PSA D, DrivE, D2 CR turbo I4; 2.0 L PSA D turbo I4; 2.0 L D3, D4 I5; 2.4 L D5 I5
- Transmission: 5-speed Getrag M56 manual; 6-speed Getrag M66 manual; 5-speed Aisin AW55-50 automatic; 6-speed Aisin TF-80SC automatic; 6-speed PowerShift dual-clutch automatic; 1-speed direct-drive 1EDT automatic (DRIVE Electric)

Dimensions
- Wheelbase: 2,640 mm (103.9 in)
- Length: 2007–2009: 4,252 mm (167.4 in); 2010–2013: 4,266 mm (168.0 in)
- Width: 1,782 mm (70.2 in)
- Height: 1,447 mm (57.0 in)
- Curb weight: 1,331–1,347 kg (2,934–2,970 lb)

Chronology
- Predecessor: Volvo 480
- Successor: Volvo V40 II; Volvo EX30

The Volvo C30 is a three-door, front-engine, front-wheel-drive premium compact hatchback manufactured and marketed by Volvo Cars from 2006 to 2013, in a single generation. Powered by inline-four and straight-five engines, the C30 is a variant of the Volvo S40/V50/C70 range, sharing the same Ford C1/Volvo P1 platform. Volvo marketed the C30 as a premium hatchback / sports coupe.

The C30's rear styling and frameless glass rear hatch recall Volvo's earlier P1800 ES and Volvo 480.

== Pre-production concepts ==
=== Volvo SCC (2001) ===
The Volvo SCC (Safety Concept Car) is a concept vehicle incorporating the rear hatch design from the Volvo P1800ES and the glass hatch from Volvo 480ES. Its safety features included forward collision warning, blind spot monitor and alert, lane departure warning, adaptive cruise control, flashing brake lights during hard braking, and headlights that follow the curvature of the road as the car turns. Many of these features would become commonplace years later. The SCC also featured a head-up display and communication with the car via mobile phone.

The SCC was first unveiled at the 2001 Detroit Auto Show, then in autumn 2001 at the Seville International Airport in southern Spain. Research to adapt its safety features for production began in 2002, and it led to development of the C30 which began in 2003.

=== 2006 SEMA concepts (2006) ===
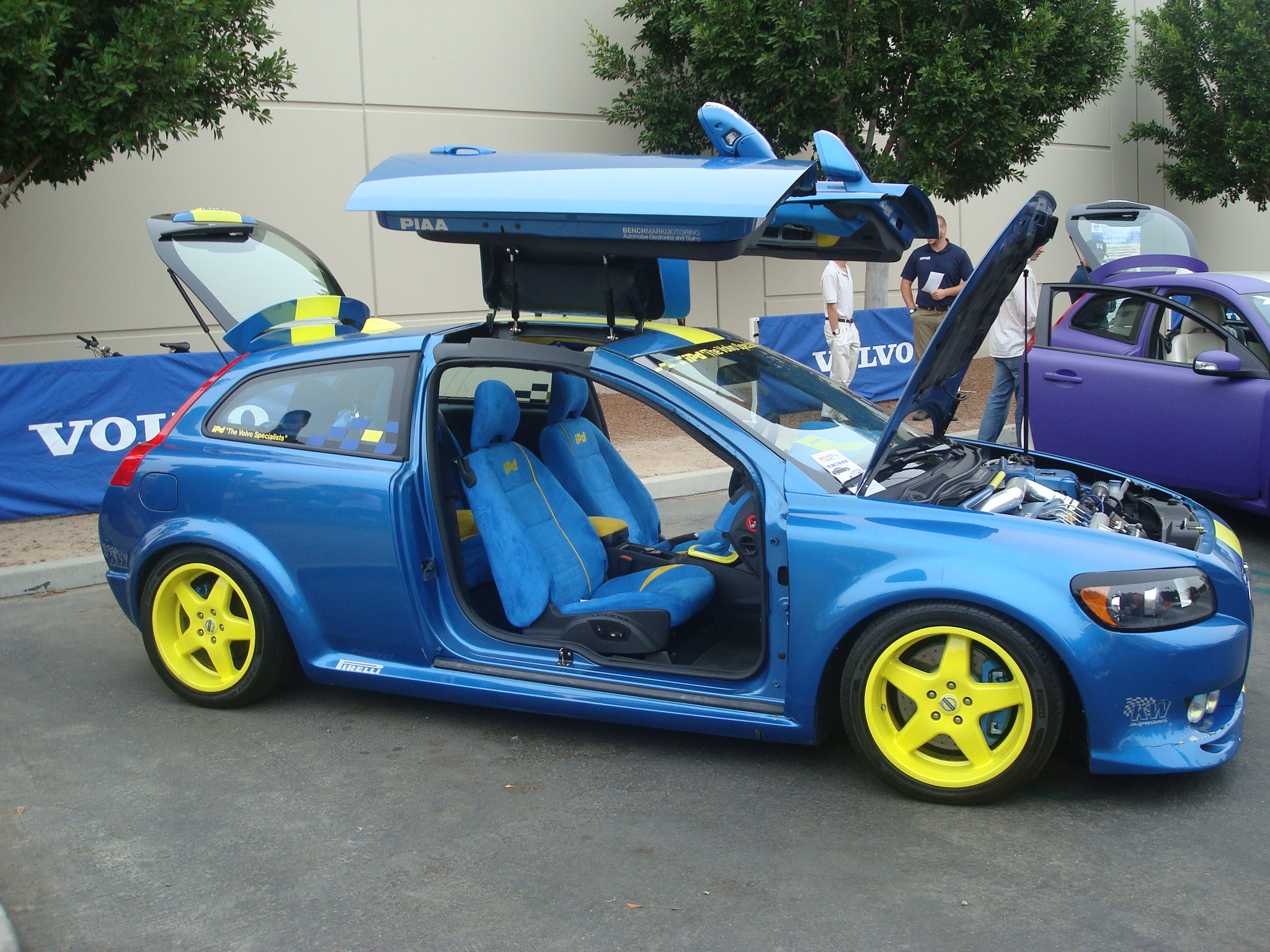
Side view of the IPD SEMA concept

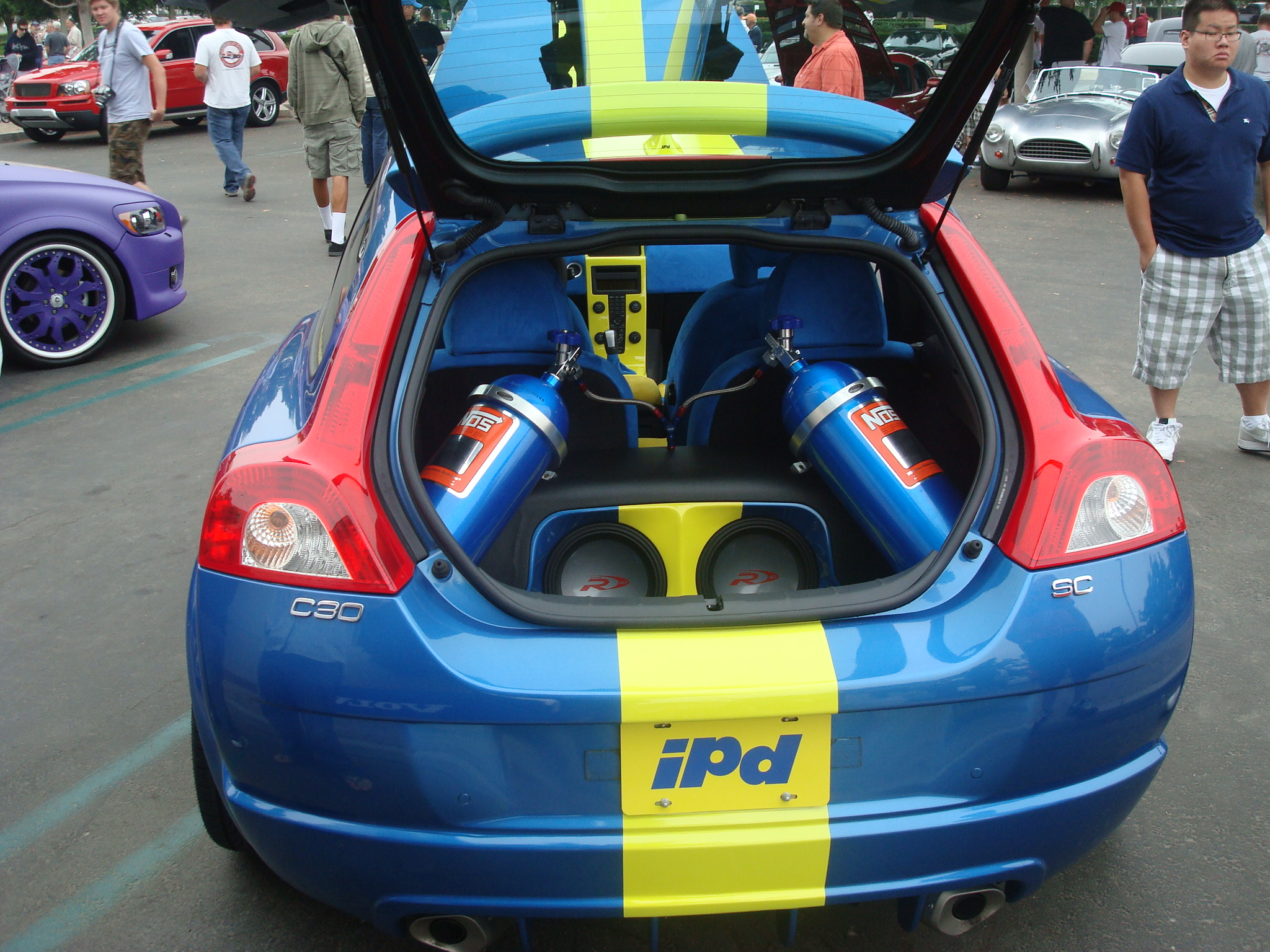
Detail on the nitrous tanks

The Evolve C30 show car has a twin turbo engine, all wheel drive, suspension from Evolve's 2004 S40 concept from the 2004 SEMA show, and 4-piston brake calipers.

The C30, by IPD, (Note: IPD is a Portland, Oregon, USA-based company that bills itself as "IPD (International Product Development): Volvo Parts, Accessories and Performance Specialists Since 1963") includes a supercharged 5-cylinder engine with belt-driven supercharger with 6 psi (0.4 bar) of boost, a nitrous tank, gull wing doors, and Alcantara seats, Alpine and Apple audio system.

The HEICO HS3 THOR is designed for outdoor enthusiasts, built by Heico Sportiv. It includes a 2.5L turbo engine (B5254T) rated at 300 PS (221 kW; 296 hp) and 420 N⋅m (310 lb⋅ft), Haldex AWD, Heico Volution V 8x18-in sport-alloy wheels with Toyo tires, and 4-caliper disk brakes with 320 mm (12.6 in) front rotors.

The vehicles were unveiled at the 2006 SEMA Show.

=== 2006 Essen concepts (2006) ===
HEICO HS3 D5 includes a 5-cylinder diesel engine rated 205 PS (151 kW; 202 hp) and 400 N⋅m (295 lb⋅ft), a body kit with front and rear bumper spoilers, side skirts, and fender flares; 8.5x20-inch VOLUTION V. wheels in Titan colour, a height-adjustable suspension kit, 4-tip stainless steel exhaust, 4-piston sports brake kit, a pedal set, foot rest, hand-brake lever, and door pins, all in aluminum; seats and door panels in two-tone upholstery.

THOR_2 is a variant of HEICO HS3 THOR concept, based on C30 T5. It includes body-kit in "XC off-road look", 30mm raised suspension, VOLUTION X 8x18-inch wheels in Titan colour, custom made TOYO TIRES R888 semi-slicks with HEICO SPORTIV 'helmet" logo, increased engine power to 250 PS (184 kW; 247 hp) and 360 N⋅m (266 lb⋅ft)

The vehicles were unveiled at the 2006 Essen Motor Show. HEICO HS3 D5 went on sale in 2007.

=== Volvo ReCharge concept (2007) ===
The ReCharge concept is a plug-in hybrid electric version of the C30, developed by Volvo's California development center. It was unveiled at the 2007 Frankfurt Motor Show. It features a 4-cylinder 1.6L flex-fuel engine and an electric motor on each wheel. It has an estimated battery range of 100 km (62 mi). The batteries have 3 hours of full recharge time. The car has a top speed of 160 km/h (99 mph). Volvo plans to sell a production plug-in hybrid C30 in Europe in 2012.

== Production version (2006) ==
A production version of C30 T5 with 160-watt sound system was officially unveiled at the 2006 Paris Motor Show.

Early model includes T5 (2.5 litres), 2.4i, 2.0, 1.8, 1.8 Flexifuel, 1.6, D5 (2.4 litre) (132 kW/180PS), D5 (120 kW/163PS) (Belgium only), 2.0D, 1.6D.

The C30's interior is similar to the S40 and V50; sharing the majority of parts including the instrument panel, 'floating' centre stack and steering wheel.

=== Europe ===
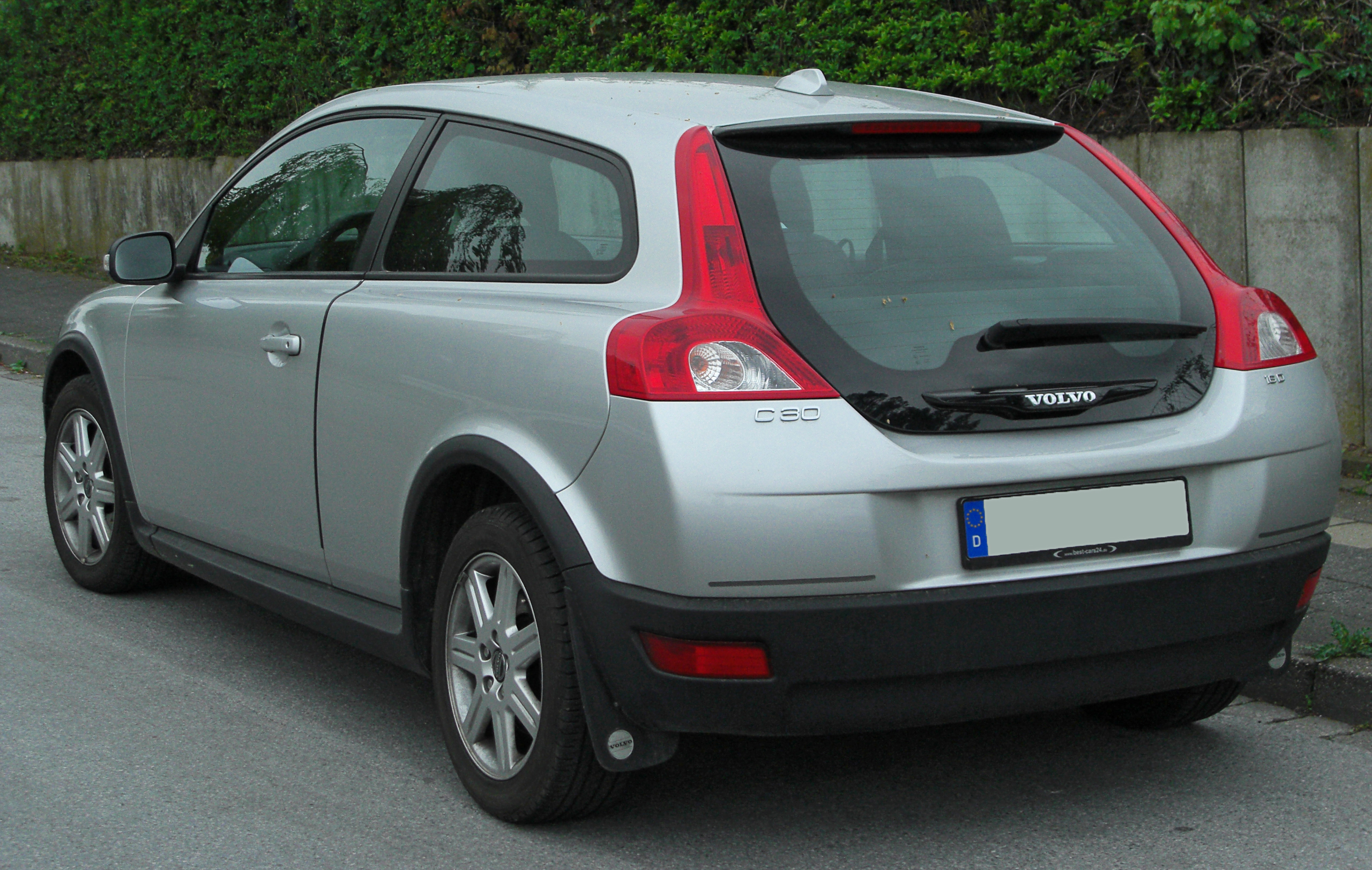
2006–2008 Volvo C30 1.6 D (Germany)

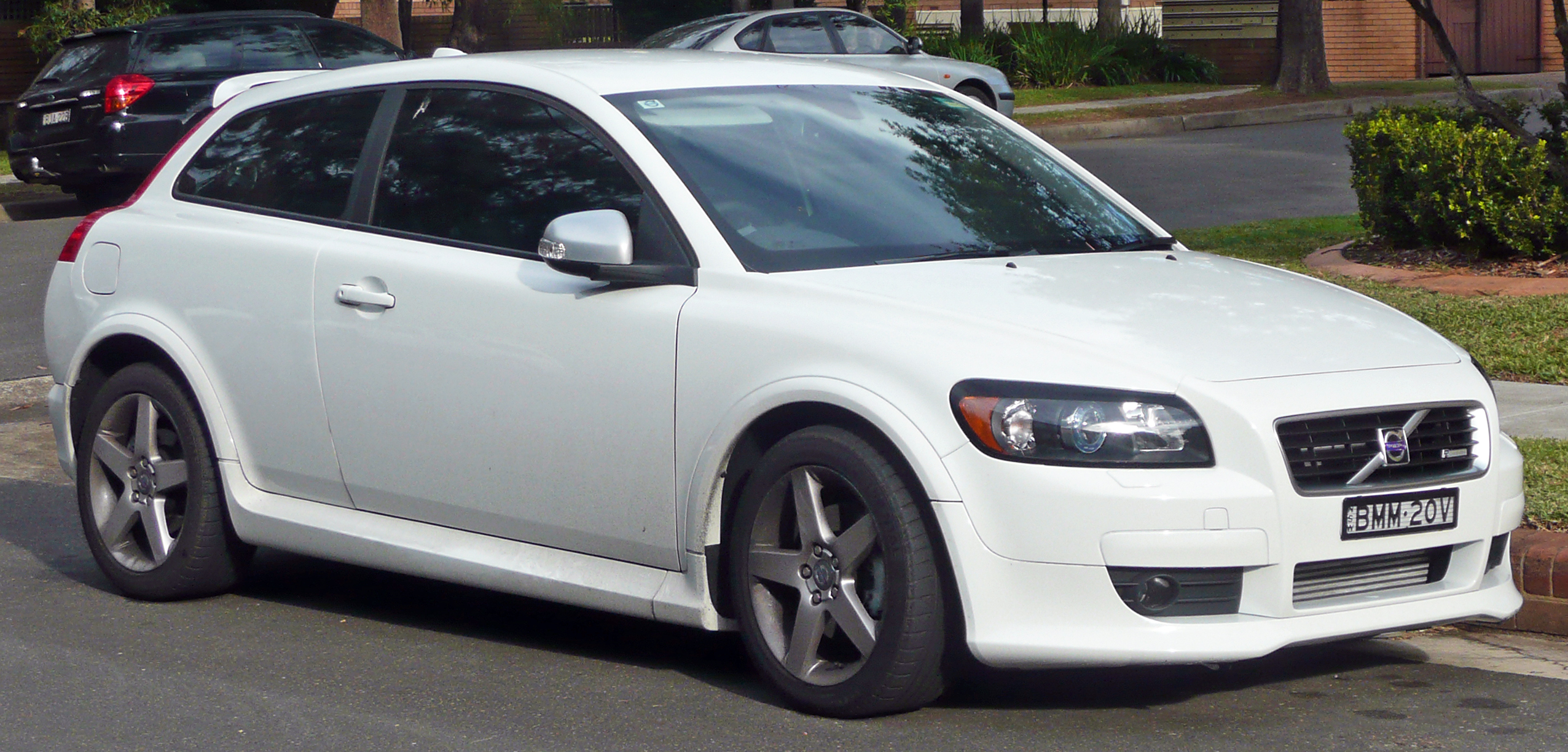
2008–2009 Volvo C30 T5 (Australia)

In late 2006, the C30 was launched in Europe. Engines choices range from a 1.6L inline-4 (petrol or diesel) to a 2.5L inline-5 turbo (2.4L diesel). 2009 added the choices of a 6-speed PowerShift dual-clutch automatic with the 2.0 L petrol and diesel engines, a 1.8L E85 flex-fuel engine, and 1.6L "DRIVe" diesel engines with improved efficiency and optional start/stop capability.

Trim lines include SE and SE Lux in the UK, and Kinetic, Momentum, and Summum (from fewest to most features) in most other European nations. The R-Design package adds interior and exterior accessories including aluminum inlays on the dashboard, R-Design emblems on the steering wheel, seats and floor mats, a rear spoiler and body kit.

=== North America ===
The C30 went on sale in Canada in March 2007 as a 2007 model, and in October 2007 in the United States as a 2008 model.

In Canada, the 2.4i was offered until 2011, while the T5 remained available until the end of production. In the United States, the only engine available was the T5. For 2008, the US C30 debuted with two trim lines, Version 1.0 and Version 2.0. R-Design was added later in the model year, featuring unique badges and interior trim. From 2009 onwards, the US C30 was offered in T5 or R-Design trim. In 2011, the Polestar performance option (developed in partnership between Volvo Car Corporation and Polestar) became available for several Volvo models, including 2008 to 2013 C30 T5 models. The software modification to the engine control computer increased output from 227 hp (169 kW) to 250 hp (186 kW) without a reduction in U.S. Environmental Protection Agency fuel economy ratings.

=== Equipment ===
Available audio systems included:

- Performance – with a 4x20W amplifier and six loudspeakers
- High Performance – with a 4x40W amplifier and eight loudspeakers
- Premium Sound – with a digital class D amplifier with ICE Power technology from Alpine, an output of 5x130W, Dolby Pro Logic II Surround, and ten loudspeakers from Danish Dynaudio

On the High Performance and Premium Sound, it is possible to play CDs with music in MP3 and WMA formats, and they are fitted with an extra AUX connector for connecting auxiliary equipment such as a portable MP3 player. Starting in the spring of 2007, an adapter for connecting an iPod or a USB flash drive will also be available as an accessory.

The 2008 model year brings some minor changes, mostly adapting the interior to the facelifted S40/V50 and including as standard an Aux audio socket.

The 2009 model year moved the Volvo badge from the hatch handle to the glass area above it, enlarged the font and increased the space between the letters. It also brought other small changes such as including the hard load cover as standard.

=== Engines and transmissions ===
Globally, Volvo C30 was offered with 9 different engines.

Petrol engines
Model	Years	Engine type, code	Max power @ rpm	Max torque @ rpm	Transmissions
1.6	2006–2013	1,596 cc (1.6 L; 97.4 cu in) I4, B4164S3	100 PS (74 kW; 99 hp) @6000	150 N⋅m (111 lb⋅ft) @4000	5-speed manual (Ford IB5)
1.8	2006–2009	1,798 cc (1.8 L; 109.7 cu in) I4, B4184S11	125 PS (92 kW; 123 hp) @6000	165 N⋅m (122 lb⋅ft) @4000	5-speed manual (Ford MTX-75)
2.0	2006–2013	1,999 cc (2.0 L; 122.0 cu in) I4, B4204S3	145 PS (107 kW; 143 hp) @6000	185 N⋅m (136 lb⋅ft) @4500	5-speed manual (Ford MTX-75), 6-speed PowerShift (Ford MPS6)
2.4i	2006–2013	2,435 cc (2.4 L; 148.6 cu in) I5, B5244S4	170 PS (125 kW; 168 hp) @6000	230 N⋅m (170 lb⋅ft) @4400	5-speed manual (Getrag M56), 5-speed Geartronic (Aisin AW55-51)
T5	2006–2007	2,521 cc (2.5 L; 153.8 cu in) I5 turbo, B5254T3	220 PS (162 kW; 217 hp)	320 N⋅m (236 lb⋅ft) @1500–4800	6-speed manual (Getrag M66), 5-speed Geartronic (Aisin AW55-51)
T5	2007–2013	2,521 cc (2.5 L; 153.8 cu in) I5 turbo, B5254T7	230 PS (169 kW; 227 hp) @5000	320 N⋅m (236 lb⋅ft) @1500–5000	6-speed manual, 5-speed Geartronic
Polestar Limited Edition	2012–2013	2,521 cc (154 cu in) I5 turbo, B5254T7	253 PS (186 kW; 250 hp) @5500	370 N⋅m (273 lb⋅ft) @3000	6-speed manual, 5-speed Geartronic automatic
Diesel engines
Model	Years	Engine type, code	Max power @ rpm	Max torque @ rpm	Transmissions
1.6D, 1.6D DRIVe	2006–2010	1,560 cc (1.6 L; 95.2 cu in) I4 turbo, D4164T	109 PS (80 kW; 108 hp) @4000	240 N⋅m (177 lb⋅ft) @1750	5-speed manual (Ford MTX-75)
D2	2010–2013	1,560 cc (95 cu in) I4 turbo, D4162T	115 PS (85 kW; 113 hp) @3600	270 N⋅m (199 lb⋅ft) @1750-2500	6-speed manual (Ford B6)
2.0D	2006–2010	1,997 cc (2.0 L; 121.9 cu in) I4 turbo, D4204T	136 PS (100 kW; 134 hp) @4000	320 N⋅m (236 lb⋅ft) @2000	6-speed manual (Getrag MMT6), 6-speed Powershift (Ford MPS6)
D3	2010–2013	1,984 cc (121 cu in) I5 turbo, D5204T5	150 PS (110 kW; 148 hp) @3500	350 N⋅m (258 lb⋅ft) @1500-2750	6-speed manual, 6-speed Geartronic automatic
D4	2010–2013	1,984 cc (121 cu in) I5 turbo, D5204T	177 PS (130 kW; 175 hp) @3500	400 N⋅m (295 lb⋅ft) @1750-2750	6-speed manual, 6-speed Geartronic automatic
D5 (automatic)	2006–2010	2,401 cc (2.4 L; 146.5 cu in) I5 turbo, D5244T8	180 PS (132 kW; 178 hp) @4000	350 N⋅m (258 lb⋅ft) @1750–3250	5-speed GearTronic
D5 (manual)	2006–2010	2,401 cc (2.4 L; 146.5 cu in) I5 turbo, D5244T13	180 PS (132 kW; 178 hp) @4000	400 N⋅m (295 lb⋅ft) @2000–2750	6-speed manual (Getrag M66)
Petrol/E85 engines
Model	Years	Engine type, code	Max power @ rpm	Max torque @ rpm	Transmissions
1.8F	2006–2009	1,798 cc (1.8 L; 109.7 cu in) I4, B4184S8	125 PS (92 kW; 123 hp) @6000	165 N⋅m (122 lb⋅ft)@4000	5-speed manual (Ford MTX-75)
2.0F	2010–2013	1,999 cc (122 cu in) I4, B4204S4	145 PS (107 kW; 143 hp) @6000	185 N⋅m (136 lb⋅ft) @4500	5-speed manual
Electric engines
Model	Year(s)	Engine type, code	Max power @ rpm	Max torque @ rpm	Transmissions
Electric	2012	E400V1	110 PS (81 kW; 108 hp)	223 N⋅m (164 lb⋅ft)	
Electric	2012	E400V2	110 PS (81 kW; 108 hp)	223 N⋅m (164 lb⋅ft)	

=== Safety ===
The C30 continues Volvo's marketing strategy to put safety as a primary concern (IntelliSafe). This is demonstrated through some recently developed safety features, including a method of overcoming the "blind spots" in the driver's view to the rear through a system known as BLIS (Blind Spot Information System).

The C30 also features a four-wheel anti-lock braking system (ABS), electronic stability program (ESP), traction control system and front, side and curtain airbags, front and rear crumple zones, and a stiff occupant cell.

The Insurance Institute for Highway Safety (IIHS) awarded the Volvo C30 their Top Safety Pick award. The C30 was granted its highest rating of "good" in front, side, rear and roof strength tests and has Electronic Stability Control as standard equipment to receive the award.

The Volvo C30 has a patented front and rear structure using four different grades of steel to absorb and redistribute impact energy around the body of the coupe. Volvo's Whiplash Protection System and Side Impact Protection System with side airbags and Inflatable Curtain are also standard. The seat belts have pretensioners to protect the occupants against unexpected accidents.

The car also uses Volvo's Intelligent Driver Information System (IDIS) which continuously monitors the car's preemptive systems such as steering wheel angle, pedal depressions, and overall factors that help the vehicle's computer to decide if the driver is busy or distracted merging or turning, and will then accordingly delay certain data or alerts that are unimportant.

The C30 has been criticized because in an effort to make it more responsive in curves it has become less reliable on ice or snow where the rear end can more easily lose its grip compared to other Volvo models.

ANCAP test results* Volvo C30 (2007)
Test	Score
Overall	5 /5 stars
Frontal offset	14.99/16
Side impact	16/16
Pole	2/2
Seat belt reminders	2/3
Whiplash protection	Not Assessed
Pedestrian protection	Poor
Electronic stability control	Optional

=== 2010 update ===
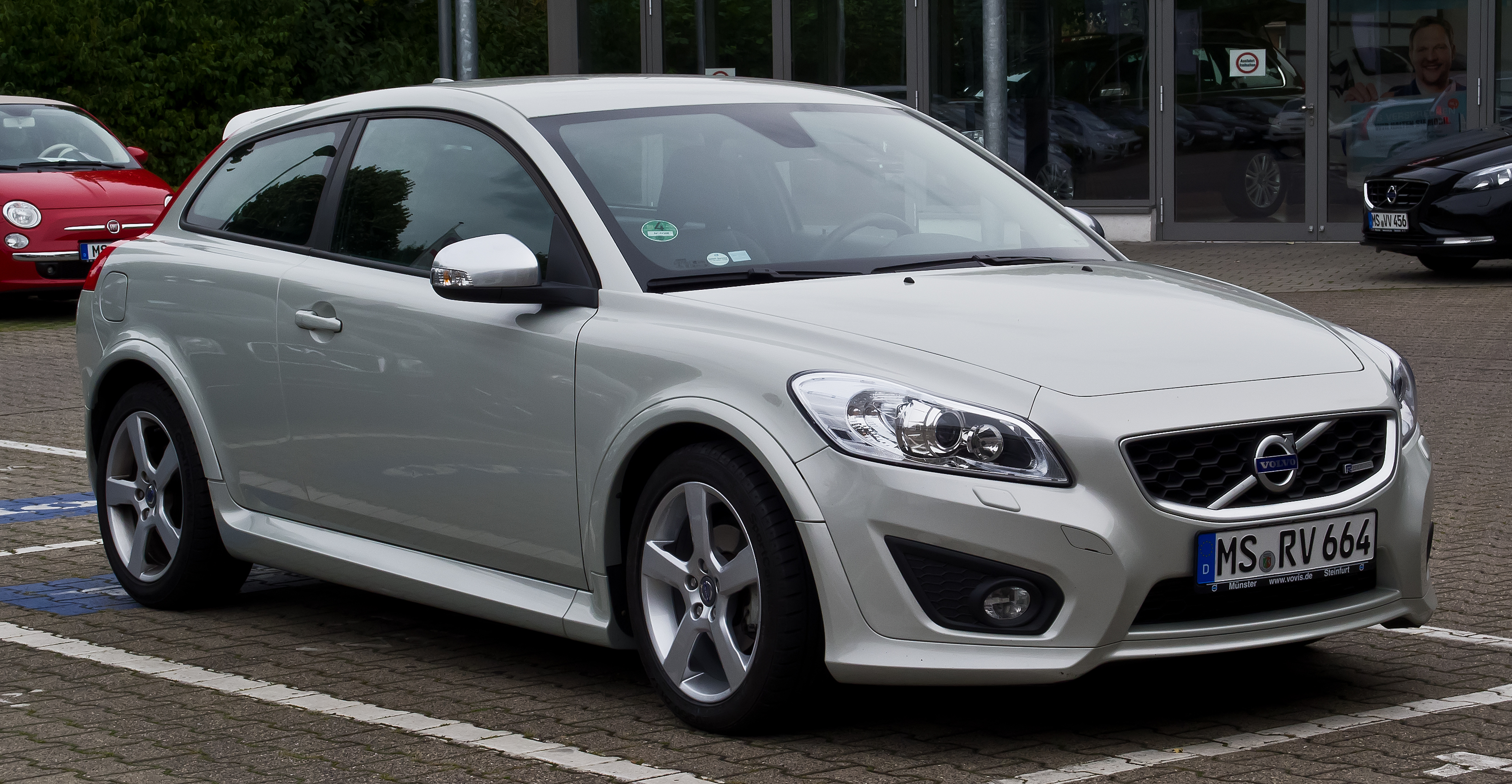
2010–2012 Volvo C30 (EU)

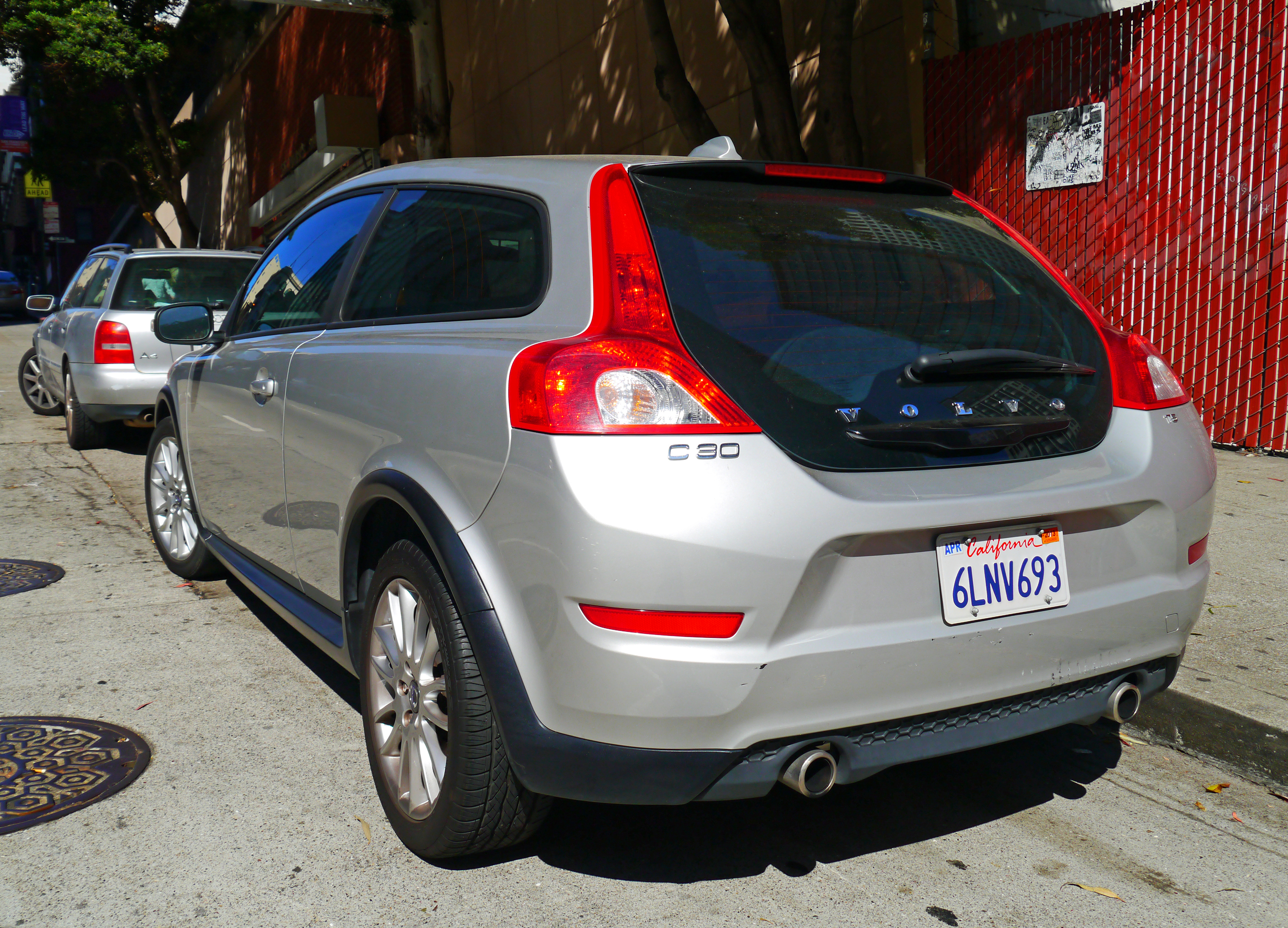
2011–2012 Volvo C30 (US)

Volvo C30 was updated in early 2010. New exterior features include:

- Redesigned front, including body panels such as the front wings
- New, larger iron mark found in the rest of the Volvo range
- Wavier and more dynamic rear
- New body colour, Orange Flame Metallic
- Visible exhaust tailpipe in the T5 and D5 models
- Two new wheel options – and for the first time, white wheels are available
- The option to choose five different colours on the lower trim – the C30 Contrast Colour Collection.

New interior features include:

- All-new colour combination known as Espresso/Blond, consisting of a dark brown upper section and a blond, fresh shade on the lower door sides. The blond tone is somewhere between grey and beige and is an expression of Volvo's strong Scandinavian design tradition.
- Luggage compartment cover in the rear, which uses a new material and a new graphic pattern to further enhance the car's modern image.
- Oyster Burst Déco centre stack option

New accessory styling kit includes foglamp décor, a front skidplate, side scuff plates with engraved C30 logo and a rear skidplate with a stylish aluminium look. For D5 and T5 two 90 mm tail pipes in polished stainless steel are added to underline the engine.

Optional sport chassis, available in all models except 1.6D DRIVe, includes lower steering ratio, giving 10% faster response to steering wheel input. Spring stiffness has been increased by no less than 30% in order to increase the car's poise in enthusiastic driving.

In spring 2009, the Volvo C30 1.6D DRIVe was available with an advanced start/stop function (as 1.6D DRIVe start/stop).

The updated vehicles were unveiled at the 2009 Frankfurt Motor Show.

The updated C30 went on sale in early 2010, as a 2011 model in North America and Australia. Early models include T5 (2.5 litres), 2.4i, 2.0, 2.0F (Flexifuel), 1.6, D5 (2.4 litres), 2.0D, 1.6D DRIVe, 1.6D DRIVe start/stop. Delivery began in early 2010.

Beginning in the 2011 model year, D3 and D4 engine options were added to the product line. Other changes include a new body colour (Flamenco Red). Cars with Volvo On Call have the option of activating the cabin heater remotely via SMS text messaging.

== Special editions ==
=== Volvo C30 Efficiency (2007) ===
The Volvo C30 Efficiency is a version of the 1.6D rated at 105 PS (104 hp; 77 kW) with reduced chassis height, a new rear roof spoiler, a new rear bumper, underbody panels, optimised engine cooling, aerodynamically optimised 16-inch wheel rims, low friction tyres, revised gearing on third through fifth gears, low-friction transmission oil, optimisation of steering servo assistance and engine management optimisation.

The vehicle was unveiled at the 2007 Frankfurt Motor Show.

=== C30 R-Design (2008) ===
The C30 R-Design is a limited version of the C30 T5 for the North American market limited to 400 units. It included a choice of four body colours (Black Sapphire, Titanium Grey, Orinoco Blue and Passion Red), Sport Body kit, off-black Flex-tech seat upholstery, cushions and backrests trimmed in contrasting crème-colored leather, blue-face instrument cluster, center console with subtle circular patterns and aluminum inlay, wrapped steering with aluminum inlays, sport pedals, sport shifter, floor mats, 18" Atreus wheels, Sirius Satellite Radio with a 6-month introductory subscription. Other options include 5-speed Geartronic transmission, DVD-based navigation system with real time traffic, power driver's seat, Climate Package, power glass moonroof, bi-xenon headlights, Serapis alloy wheels and Dynaudio premium sound system.

=== Boston Red Sox Edition (2008) ===
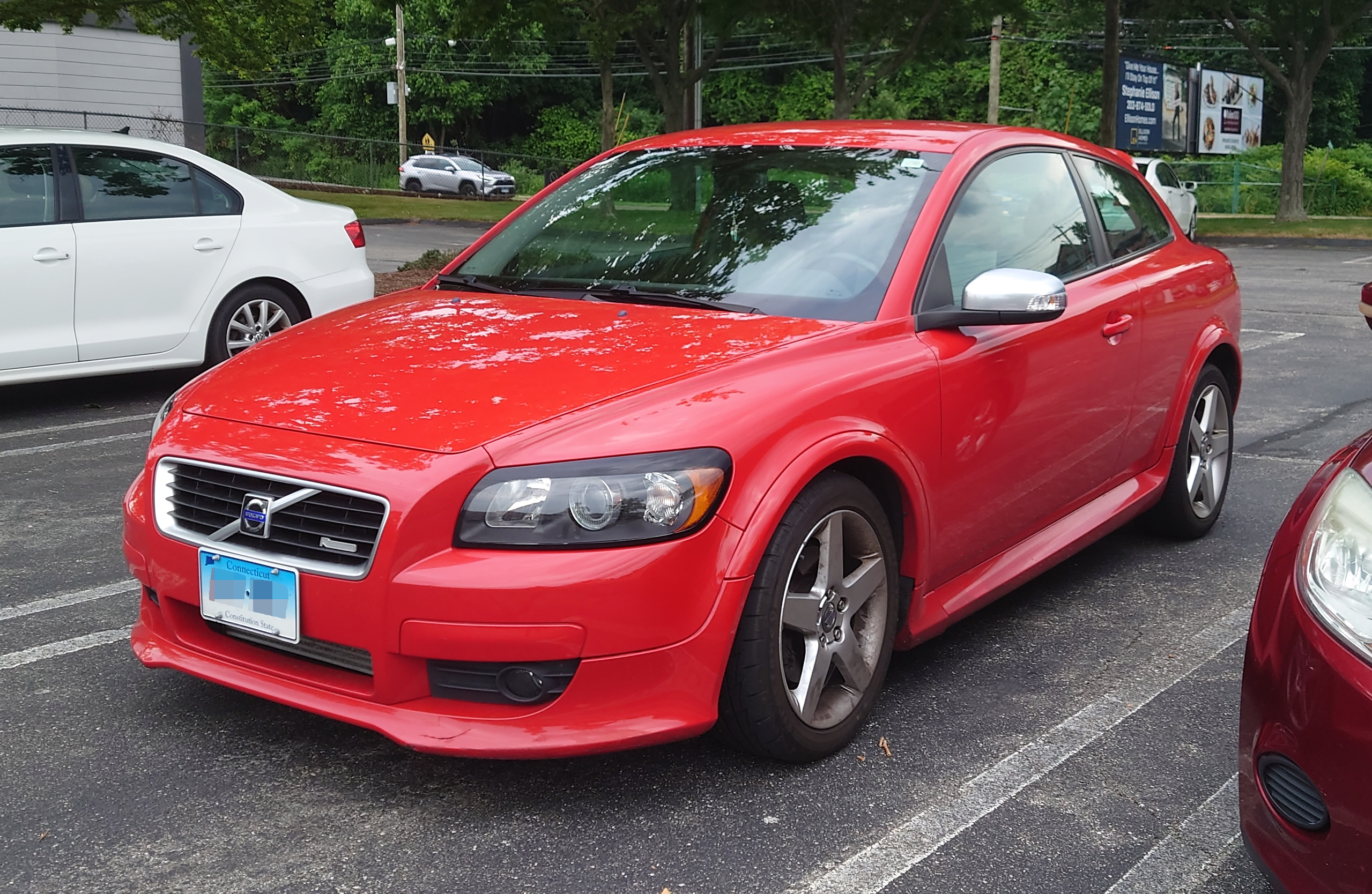
A 2008 Volvo C30 Boston Red Sox Edition

To commemorate the Boston Red Sox's 107 victories in 2007, a special edition of the C30 T5 R-Design limited to 107 units was released for the US market. It was sold with either a five-speed automatic transmission or 6 speed manual transmission with Geartronic. It included a red exterior color, a Boston Red Sox logo on the rear hatch glass, Red Sox logo floor mats, and Boston Red Sox fender badges.

The vehicle was unveiled at the 2008 New York Auto Show. The production version went on sale in April 2008.

=== C30 R-Design (2010–2013) ===
It is a version of C30 with following:

- R-Design badge in the grille
- Grille and door mirror housings in special silk metal finish
- Body kit with front and rear spoilers, lower door trim moulding and side-skirts colour-matched to the rest of the body, 10 mm reduction in ride height
- New 17-inch five-spoke Cratus aluminium wheels (18-inch optional)
- Tailgate spoiler
- Visible chrome-plated sports tailpipes (90 mm)
- Upholstery in two colour combinations: cream-coloured leather with sides in dark grey Flex-Tec, or off-black leather with edges in off-black (new)
- Embossed R-Design emblem in the front seats
- R-Design centre stack and panel inserts
- Gear lever knob trimmed in leather and aluminium
- Sports pedals in aluminium, with rubber ribs
- Sports steering wheel trimmed in leather, with R-Design emblem
- Blue speedometer and rev counter gauges
- Textile floor mats with contrasting piping

=== C30 Black Design (2011) ===
It is a limited (600 units) version of the C30 1.6 D2 (115PS), 1.6 DRIVe (115PS), 2.0 D3 (150PS) or 2.0 (145PS) for Italy market, designed by Eidon and Berman. It included DI-NOC film (3M) carbon fiber surface finish at roof, side frames, the frame of the grille and door mirrors, Fondmetal 17-inch rims in matte black (optional Fondmetal 17-inch rims in matte black), a choice of 5 body colors ( bianco ghiacciato(white), grigio titanio(anthracite), argento electrico metallizzato, orange flame metallizzato (orange flame metallic), argento metallizzato).

=== 2013 C30 Polestar Limited Edition (2012–2013) ===
The 2013 C30 Polestar Limited Edition is a limited (250 units) version of the C30 T5 R-Design for the US market. It included increase engine power via increasing airflow into the combustion chambers and advancing spark timing, 17-inch Styx alloy wheels in matte black, Polestar badges on the rear and sides of the vehicle, Rebel Blue body color, leather seating surfaces in a choice of Off-Black or two-tone Off-Black and Calcite color, C30 T5 R-Design Premium Plus equipment (power glass sunroof, power driver's seat with memory, soft loadcover, auto-dimming rearview mirror with compass, power passenger's seat, LED daytime running lights, Keyless Drive and active dual Xenon headlights), optional Platinum trim (Dolby Pro Logic II Surround Sound, 10 loudspeakers rated 650 watts, navigation system with real time traffic, remote control and map care plus Sirius/XM satellite radio), color-coordinated body kit, front grille R-Design logo, R-Design watch dial instrument cluster, unique aluminum inlays, R-Design sport steering wheel and sport pedals; standard rain sensor windshield wipers and headlight washers, optional Climate Package (heated front seats, Electronic Climate Control (ECC) and Interior Air Quality System (IAQS)), spring stiffness increased by 30 percent, mono-tube design dampers with 20 percent increased low-speed damping, stiffer bushings and a 10-percent-quicker steering ratio.

The vehicle went on sale beginning in October 2012.

=== C30 Polestar Performance Concept Prototype (2010) ===
It is a version of C30 inspired by the Polestar STCC race car based on T5, designed by Polestar Performance. It included 2.5L Turbo engine with larger intercooler and KK & K 26 turbo, modified pistons, conrods and inlet camshaft, rated at 405 PS (298 kW; 399 hp) and 510 N⋅m (376 lb⋅ft); Haldex AWD with Quaife mechanical differential brake front and rear, Öhlins shock absorbers and springs with 2.25 ratio steering rack, Brembo 380 mm front brake discs with six piston calipers, Brembo 330 mm rear brake discs with four piston calipers, BBS FI 19x8,19-inch wheels with Pirelli P Zero 235/35 ZR 19 tires, racing seats with Ternsjö leather and four point harness, aerodynamic body derived from the STCC race car.

The vehicle was unveiled at the 2010 Gothenburg Motor show.

The official build for C30 PCP is as follows:

Standard Volvo T5: 2.5L Turbo with Volvo Diesel Intercooler and 3K K26 Turbocharger. Max Boost 23psi. S60R Pistons, Connecting Rods and Exhaust Camshsaft from a Naturally Aspirated 5 -Cylinder Engine. Valve Springs from a 3.2L Naturally Aspirated 6-Cylinder Engine. Bosch 550cc Injectors. Volvo 850 Flywheel. Sachs Performance Clutch. 3" Ferrita Stainless Steel Exhaust.

Drivetrain: Haldex Gen 4 AWD. Quaife Mechanical Differential Front and Rear.

Chassis: Olins Shock Absorbers and Springs. High Ratio Steering Rack with 2,25 turns lock-to-lock.

Performance: Weight- 1365kg Power - 455hp. Torque 391ft.lbs. Max RPM 7800 for 3seconds, then 7500. 0-60 - 3.9s

Brakes: Brembo Front 380mm Discs 6 Piston Calipers Brembo Rear 330mm Discs 4 Piston Calipers

Wheels: BBS FI 19x8.75"

Interior: Recaro Seats with Ternsjö Leather

Exterior: Aerodynamics Derived from the Polestar STCC Race Car

Colour: Polestar Blue

=== Range Extenders concepts (2011) ===
Volvo C30 with series-connected Range Extender is based on C30 Electric with a three-cylinder combustion engine producing 60 PS (44 kW; 59 hp) installed under the rear load compartment floor. The car also has a 40-litre fuel tank. The combustion engine is connected to a 40 kW generator. The combined power is used to drive the car's 111 PS (82 kW; 109 hp) electric motor, but the driver can also choose to let the generator charge the battery, thus increasing the car's operating range on electricity. This Range Extender increases the electric car's range by up to 1,000 km – on top of the 110 km range provided by the car's battery pack.

Volvo C30 with parallel-connected Range Extender includes a turbocharged three-cylinder combustion engine rated at 190 PS (140 kW; 187 hp) at the rear and a 40-litre fuel tank, six-speed automatic transmission. 40 kW generator the battery can also be charged to give the car increased range on electricity alone. The electric motor is same as series-connected Range Extender car. The combined power is rated 300 PS (221 kW; 296 hp). This Range Extender increases the electric car's range by up to 1,000 km – on top of the 75 km range provided by the car's battery pack.

Production of fuel cells began in 2010.

== C30 DRIVe Electric (2011–2013) ==
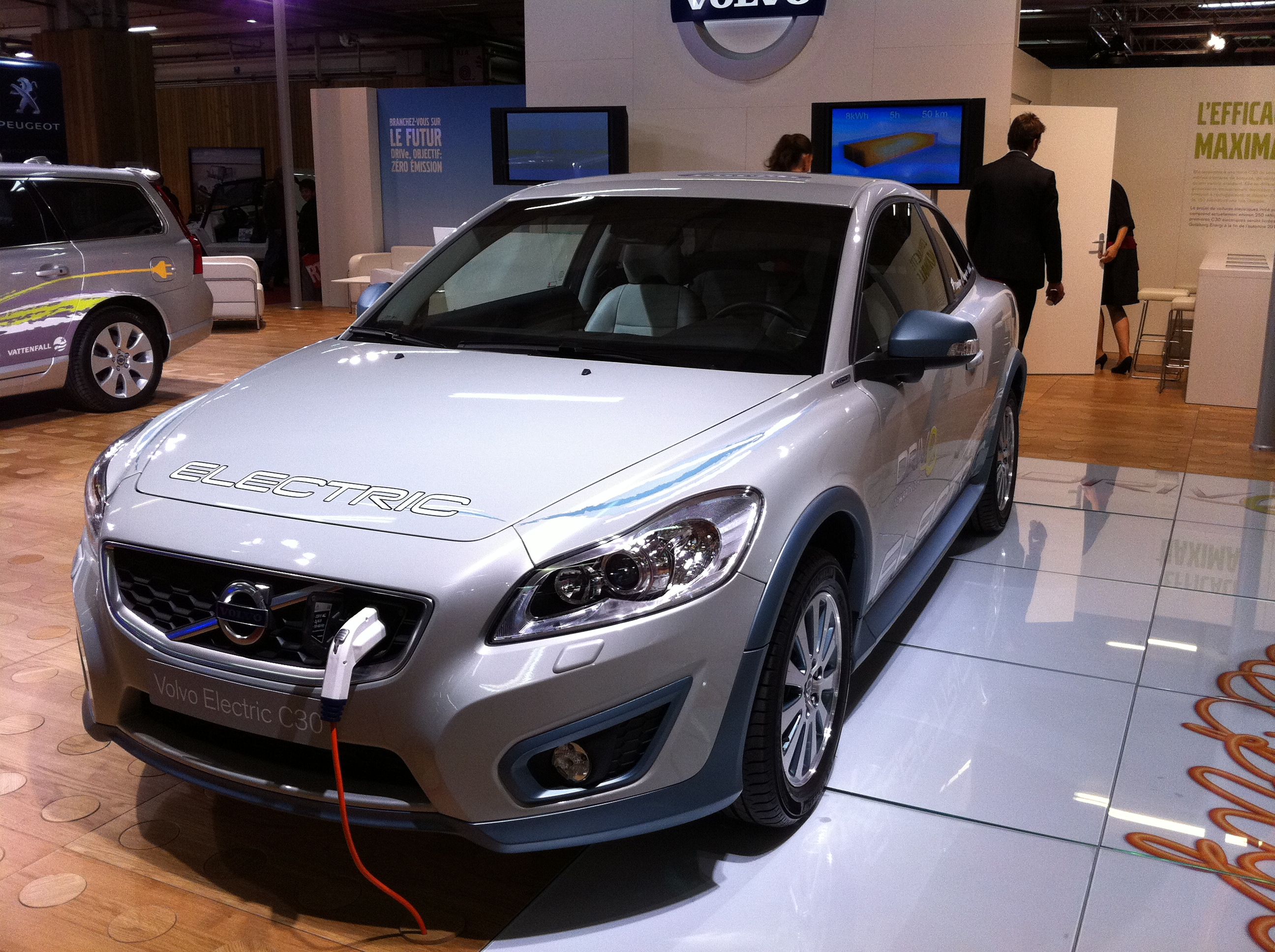
Volvo C30 Electric exhibited at the 2010 Paris Motor Show.

The Volvo C30 Electric was a limited-production battery electric car produced in the mid-2010s.

The prototype C30 electric car used an 82 kW electric motor, and had a 24 kWh lithium-ion battery pack installed in the propshaft tunnel and in the space normally occupied by the fuel tank, outside the passenger compartment and away from the deformations zones. The C30 electric delivers up to 150 km (93 mi) under the NEDC cycle.

A drivable C30 prototype was presented in September 2009. An updated prototype (with complete interior and full instrumentation, and enhanced battery packaging) was unveiled in the 2010 North American International Auto Show.

The C30 DRIVe Electric concept car was exhibited in the 2010 Paris Motor Show and presented as the C30 DRIVe.

Field testing of about 50 C30 electric cars was conducted in Sweden beginning the fourth quarter of 2010, mainly internally at the Volvo Car Corporation. A Volvo C30 Electric was also part of the One Tonne Life project in which a family was given the task of living as climate-smart as possible for a period of six months. In July 2012 Volvo delivered 15 Volvo C30 electric cars as part of an open road test-drive project in Shanghai.

The electric C30 has a 24 kWh lithium-ion battery, supplied by US manufacturer EnerDel. The electric motor, the motor controller, the charger and other drivetrain components were supplied by Swiss manufacturer BRUSA Elektronik AG. Top speed was estimated by Volvo to be 130 km/h (81 mph), with acceleration from 0–50 km/h (0–31 mph) in 4 seconds. The C30 Electric can be recharged from a regular household power socket and a full charge takes about 7 hours. The all-electric range is up to 150 kilometres (93 mi). The batteries are installed where the fuel tank normally sits and also in a special compartment in the C30's central tunnel, and as a result, the luggage compartment is unchanged. In August 2012 Volvo ordered a second supply of battery packs from EnerDel to build an internal test fleet together with Siemens.

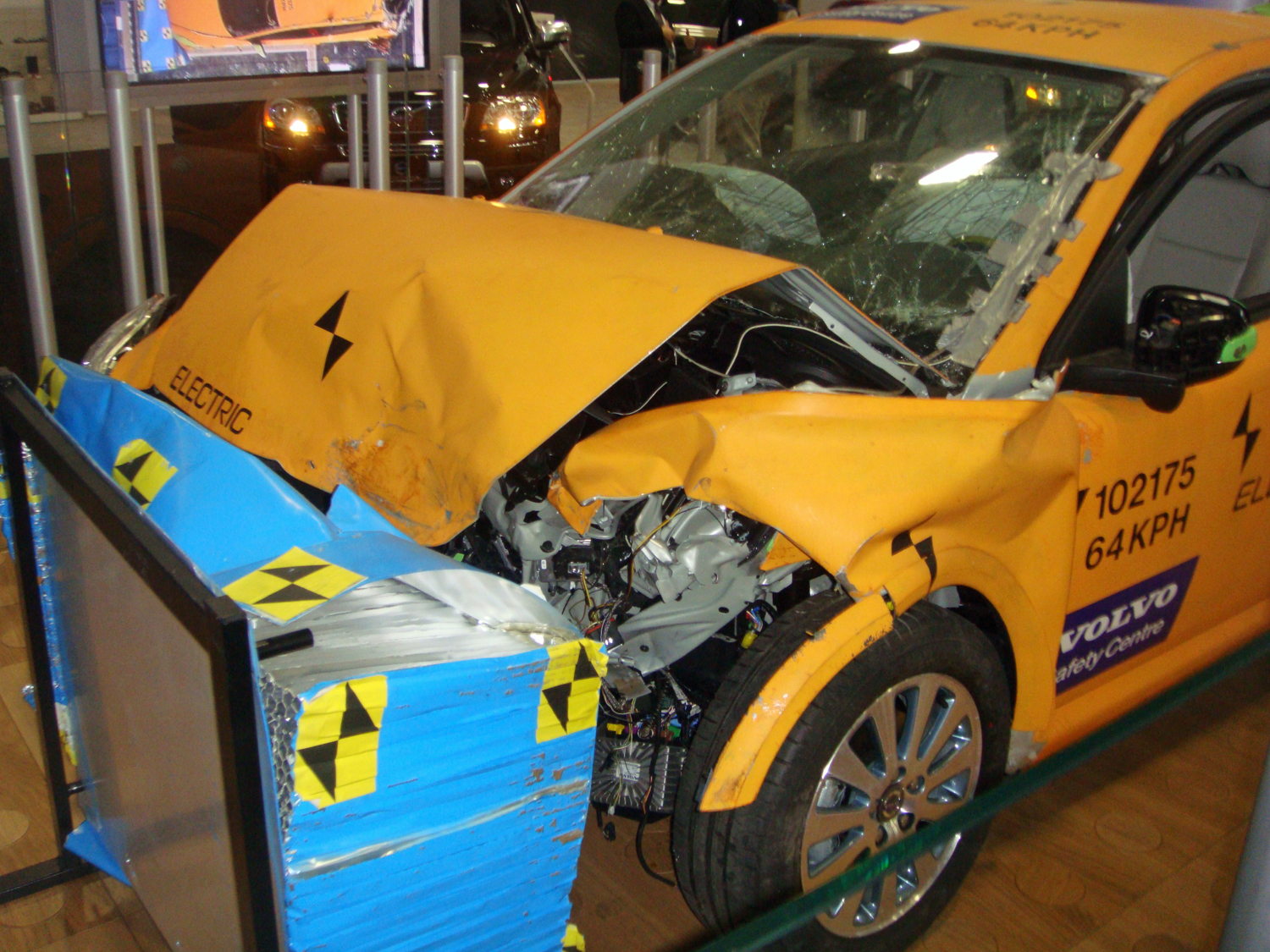
Frontal crash test of the C30 Electric to assess the safety of the battery pack.

The Volvo C30 Electric is equipped with three climate systems: one supplies the passengers with heating or cooling; one cools or warms the battery pack as necessary; and the electric motor and power electronics are water-cooled. The climate control in the passenger cabin features a bioethanol-powered heater, a solution chosen by Volvo to get heating without compromising the battery driving range, but the driver has the option to run the climate unit on electricity from the batteries. Ethanol is the default mode and the ethanol tank can carry 14.5 litres (3.8 US gal) of bio-ethanol. Volvo tested the C30 in winter conditions in temperatures as low as −20 °C (−4 °F) in 2011.

=== Awards ===
The C30 DRIVe was one of the five finalists to the 2011 Green Car Vision Award. In July 2012, the Volvo C30 electric was named the "Green Car of the Year" in China at the 4th China New Energy Mobility Summit.

=== Production ===
The Volvo C30 Electric body was built on the regular assembly line in the Ghent, Belgium factory, and then the glider is transported to Gothenburg for installation of the motor, batteries and other C30 Electric-specific assemblies.

As a low production car, Volvo intended to lease the Volvo C30 Electric only to corporate customers, mainly companies, authorities and government agencies. Initial deliveries were scheduled for the third quarter of 2011 throughout Europe, including in Sweden, Belgium, the Netherlands and Norway. Volvo planned to build about 250 cars by the end of 2012, and possibly more if market interest occasioned. Volvo also planned to allocate a total of 100 Volvo C30 Electrics for the US, half of which would be offered on the West Coast and the other half on the East Coast. Volvo targeted the leases to corporate and government fleet users at a price of around US$2,100 per month in the U.S. and €1,500 per month in Europe on a three-year lease. As this pricing was much higher than other electric cars available in the market by 2011, demand was expected to be low, and Volvo explained that their prices reflect the actual cost of the limited-production car. During 2011, 6 units were registered in France. A total of 126 units have been leased in Sweden through September 2012 since 2011. As of July 5, 2013, the C30 was no longer available to order from Volvo, nor did it remain the model line up on the Volvo Cars website. The last C30's from current stock were intended to be registered by the end of 2013, but none were produced after July 2013.

Production of the C30 Electric began in June 2011. Delivery of first ten C30 Electric went to the energy company Göteborg Energi with deliveries starting at the autumn of 2010. Leasing to fleet customers in Sweden, Belgium, the Netherlands and Norway began in the third quarter of 2011. A total of 209 units have been leased in Europe through October 2012, Sweden is the top selling market with 149 units delivered since 2011 through March 2013.

Production ceased in December 2012 and the C30 line was discontinued in 2013.

=== Marketing ===
In the 'DRIVe Around the World' C30 DRIVe campaign, a Facebook game was created to challenge users to virtually drive a Volvo C30 DRIVe to a Facebook friend who lives as close to 1,333 kilometres away from Sweden to Egypt as possible. The challenge began in 2009-11-16 and ended in 2010-02-05. The game was promoted with an animated trailer, which received 569,000 views worldwide in 169 countries. The Volvo fan page (www.facebook.com/volvo) was rewarded by a donation from Volvo Cars of 15,000 EURO in the Volvo Fans' team name to a Gold Standard certified wind farm project in Izmir, Turkey.

In the One Tonne Life project, the Lindell family lived in a temporary home from A-hus and drove Volvo C30 Electric. The project house was designed by architect Gert Wingårdh.

== Motorsport ==
Volvo Polestar driver Robert Dahlgren won the 2010 Scandinavian Touring Car Championship. In addition, after 8 of 9 rounds of STCC Driver's Championship 2010, Robert Dahlgren lead the tournament, and Volvo Polestar placed 2nd in the team championship.

Robert Dahlgren won the 2010 STCC Driver's Championship, while Volvo Polestar won the 2010 STCC Team Championship.

In the 2011 World Touring Car Championship season, the Polestar Racing team used Volvo C30 DRIVe as their race car.

Volvo C30 Electric shared first place in the 130-kilometre Michelin Challenge Bibendum rally plus awards for handling, well to wheel CO_{2} emissions and local emissions.

Polestar Racing entered 2011 WTCC season with one Volvo C30 DRIVe racer driven by Robert Dahlgren.

In 2011 World Touring Car Championship, Robert Dahlgren crashed out of qualifying in Macau race, ending the Polestar Racing team's season career.

The C30 won 5 races during the 2011 Pirelli World Challenge season.

=== STCC-Volvo (2010) ===
It is a race car version of C30 designed for the 2010 Swedish Touring Car Championship.

== Marketing ==
As part of the European C30 launch, a series of 16 different television commercials were created by Fuel London (part of Euro RSCG Worldwide) under the campaign's theme, "A Product of Free Will."

As part of the US C30 launch, Volvo C30's configuration site featured a fluctuating price quote for the identically equipped vehicles. Volvo's intention was to determine what potential buyers are willing to pay and how many vehicles they should ship to the States.

In Stephenie Meyer's popular Twilight novel series, it is suggested that Edward drives a "shiny" and "silver" Volvo S60-R, a fast sleeper car that doesn't call attention to the Cullen family's wealth. The film series partnered with Volvo to place a Volvo C30 in the 2008 Twilight film, feeling that the C30 better suited the persona of a 108 year old vampire pretending to be a 17-year-old high school student. Volvo reported an increase in the sale of the C30 in the US market following the film's release, and helped change the perception of Volvo as a "cool" car in a younger generation of buyers.

== Sales ==
Calendar year	United States	Canada	Global
2006	0	0	1,596
2007	2,103	1,143	46,726
2008	4,299	1,142	39,966
2009	4,266	906	32,409
2010	3,906	755	35,981
2011	3,471	682	27,090
2012	2,827	607	19,256
2013	1,361	310	5,628
Total	22,233	5,545	208,652

== See also ==
- Volvo S40
- Volvo V50
- Volvo C70
