= Volvo R =

High-performance cars by Volvo

Volvo R, R-Design
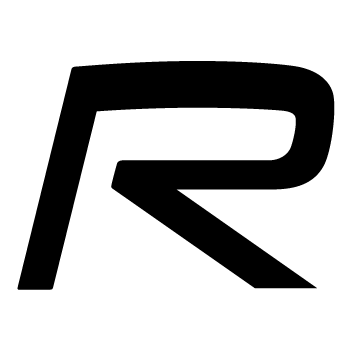
- Type: Marque
- Industry: Automotive industry
- Founded: 1995
- Successor: Polestar (as Volvo's performance line)
- Products: Performance engines and cars; Automotive sports accessories
- Services: Research and development
- Owner: Geely
- Parent: Volvo Cars

The Volvo R marque represents the high-performance division of cars produced by Volvo. The R marque refers to an unknown adjective, since Volvo markets R-designated vehicles as being the most performance-oriented trim level. The first vehicle in the Volvo R marque lineup, the Volvo 850 T-5R, was introduced in 1995 (rebranded to the 850 R in 1996), followed by the Volvo S70 R and Volvo V70 R in 1998. A related performance trim line, Volvo R-Design, was launched for 2008. Volvo's high-performance vehicles are now developed by their Polestar division, although most Volvo models are offered in an R-Design trim level.

== R marque models ==
=== Volvo 850 T-5R ===
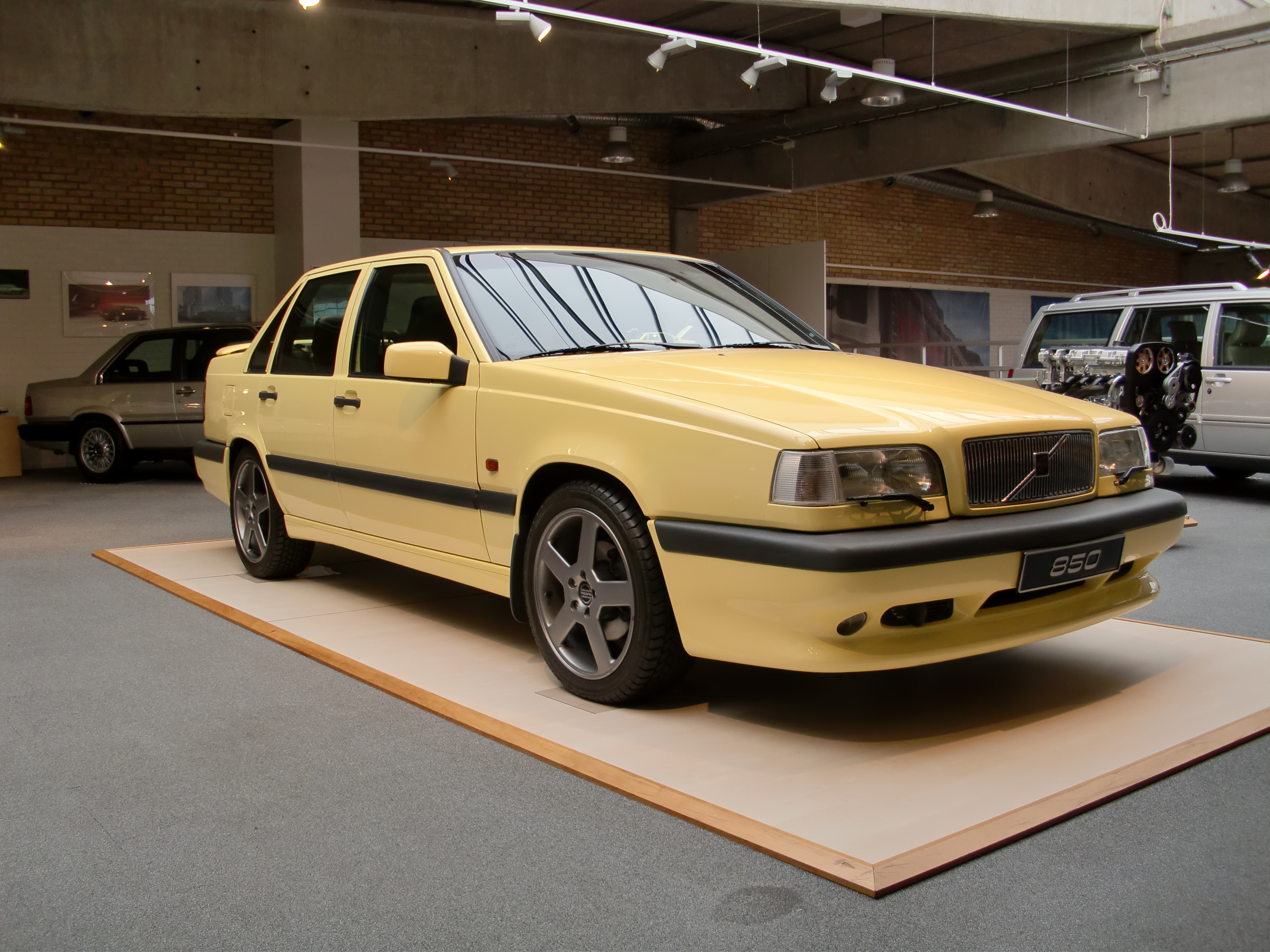
The 1995 Volvo 850 T5-R was the first Volvo branded with the R marque.

For 1995, the special limited edition 850 T-5R was offered, and was a commercial success, leading Volvo to produce a second run in 1996. Originally, it was to be called 850 Plus 5. The vehicle was based on the 850 Turbo, utilizing the B5234T4 engine with a special ECU (Bosch #628 in U.S and #629 in EU) that added an additional 2 psi (0.1 bar) of turbocharger boost pressure, giving the engine an extra 18 hp (13 kW; 18 PS) for a total of 243 hp (181 kW) and 250 lb⋅ft (340 N⋅m) of torque. The engine was mated to a 4-speed automatic transmission or 5-speed manual transmission, the latter of which was not available in the United States. The T-5R was renowned as a sleeper car; despite its boxy, understated appearance, it boasted a drag coefficient of 0.29 and was capable of accelerating from 0 to 60 mph (97 km/h) in 6.8 - 7.0 seconds (depending on transmission and body type). The top speed was electronically limited to 152.2 mph (244.9 km/h). The vehicle came standard with Pirelli P-Zero tyres, providing lateral grip of 0.88 g. The engine tuning was co-developed with Porsche, and the transmission and other powertrain components. Porsche also aided in designing some of the interior, such as the Alcantara seat inserts. These cars came as standard with nearly every feature available, only a handful of options - such as heated rear seats - were available. On the North American market only two options could be chosen, a trunk-mounted Alpine 6-CD changer and no-cost 16-inch wheels for a smoother, more comfortable ride and driveability in snow when using all-season tires.

=== Volvo 850 R ===
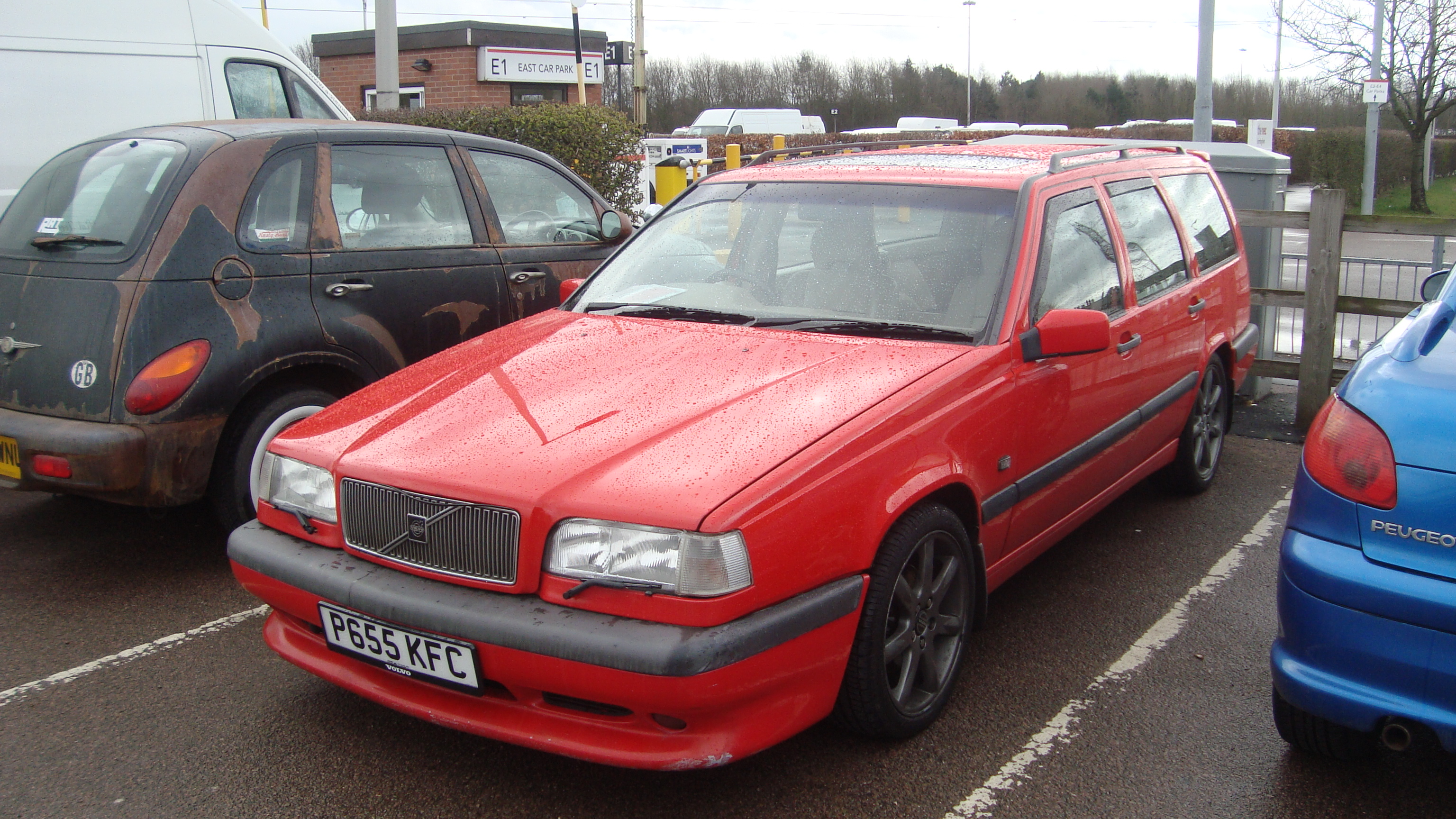
The Volvo 850 R was produced as both a sedan and a wagon.

In the spring of 1996, Volvo introduced a new high-performance Volvo 850 as a replacement for the hugely successful limited edition T-5R. Volvo initially decided there would be no direct successor to the T-5R, but due to its success, instead decided to develop a new high-performance model. The new car, based on the T-5R, was called the 850 R, which again came in either saloon or sport wagon editions.

=== Volvo S70 R ===
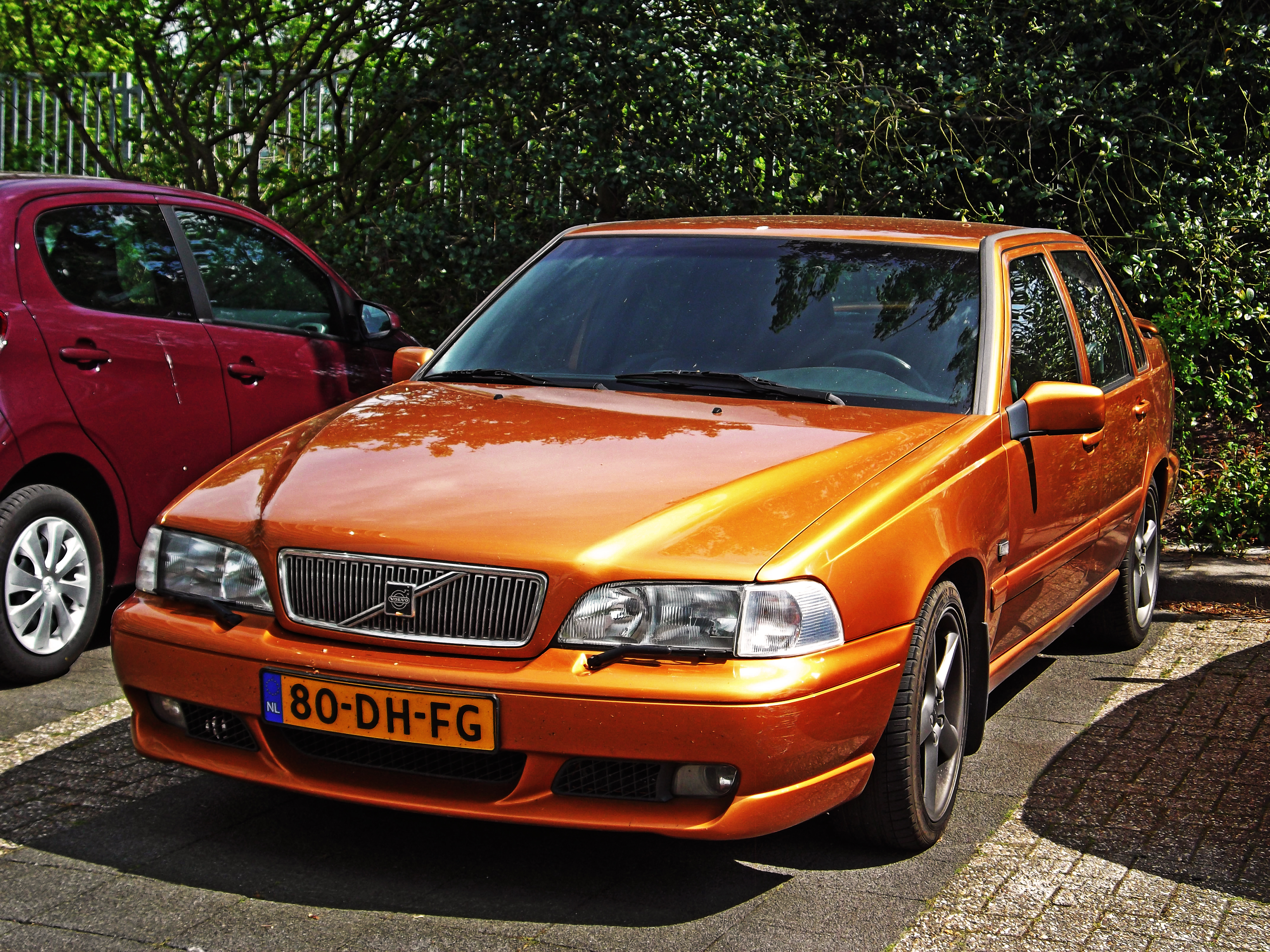
The Volvo S70 R was produced for the 1998 model year.

An S70 'R' version was introduced in 1997 for the 1998 model year and offered the highest performance of all S70 models. The engine was rated at 250 metric horsepower (184 kW; 247 hp) and 350 newton-metres (258 lbf⋅ft) for models fitted with a five-speed manual gearbox and limited-slip differential. Models fitted with a four-speed automatic gearbox were rated at 240 metric horsepower (177 kW; 237 hp) and 330 N⋅m (240 lb⋅ft). Only FWD versions were produced. The model was only available in Europe and few select other countries.

=== Volvo S60 R ===
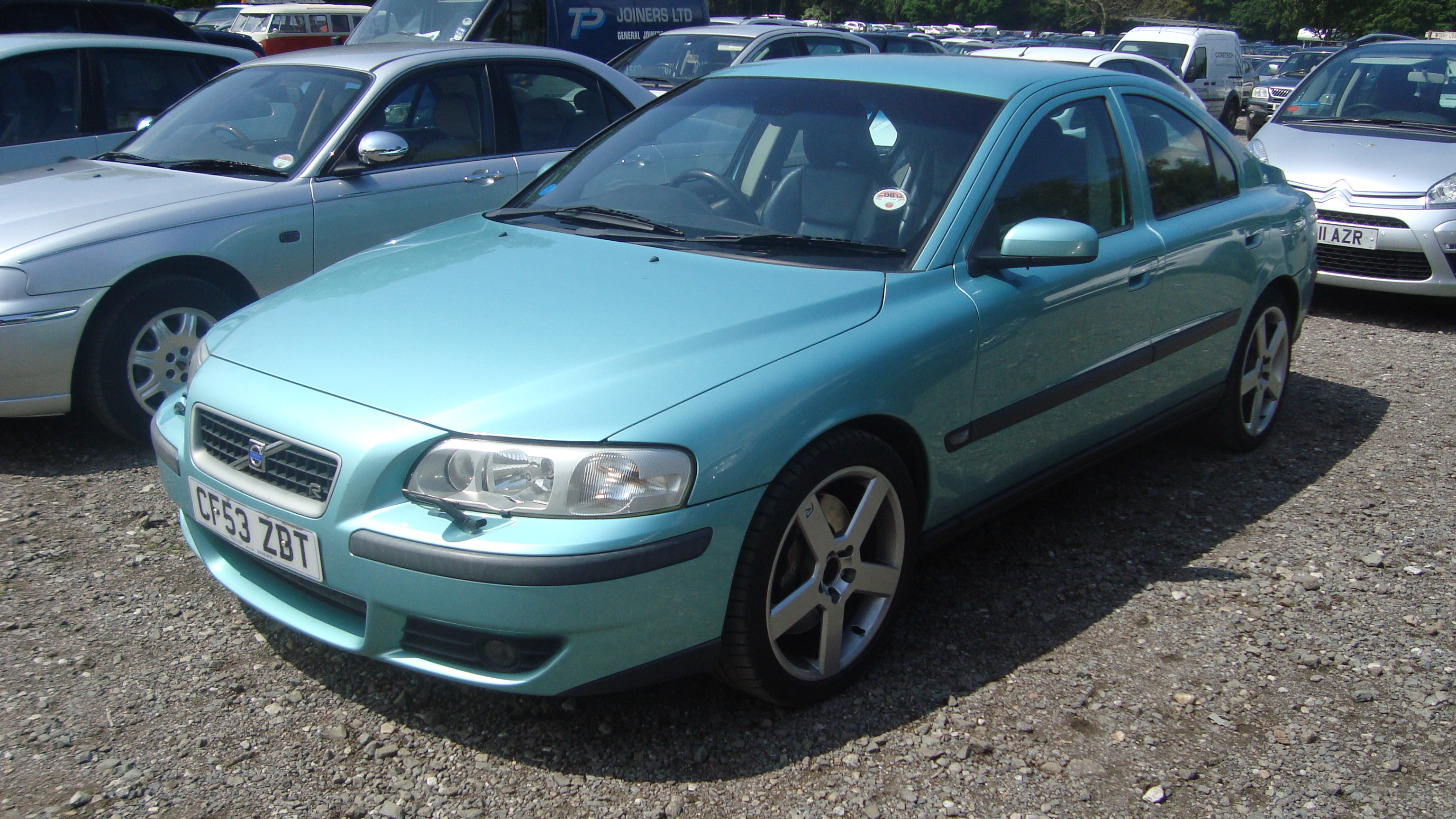
The Volvo S60 R was the replacement for the Volvo S70 R

First introduced in 2004, Volvo's S60 R used a Haldex all-wheel drive system mated to a 300 PS (221 kW; 296 hp) / 400 N⋅m (300 lbf⋅ft) inline-5. The 2004–2005 models came with a 6-speed manual transmission, or an available 5-speed automatic which allowed only 258 lb⋅ft (350 N⋅m) torque in 1st and 2nd gears. The 2006–2007 models came with a 6-speed manual or 6-speed automatic transmission (which was no longer torque-restricted).

=== Volvo V70 R ===
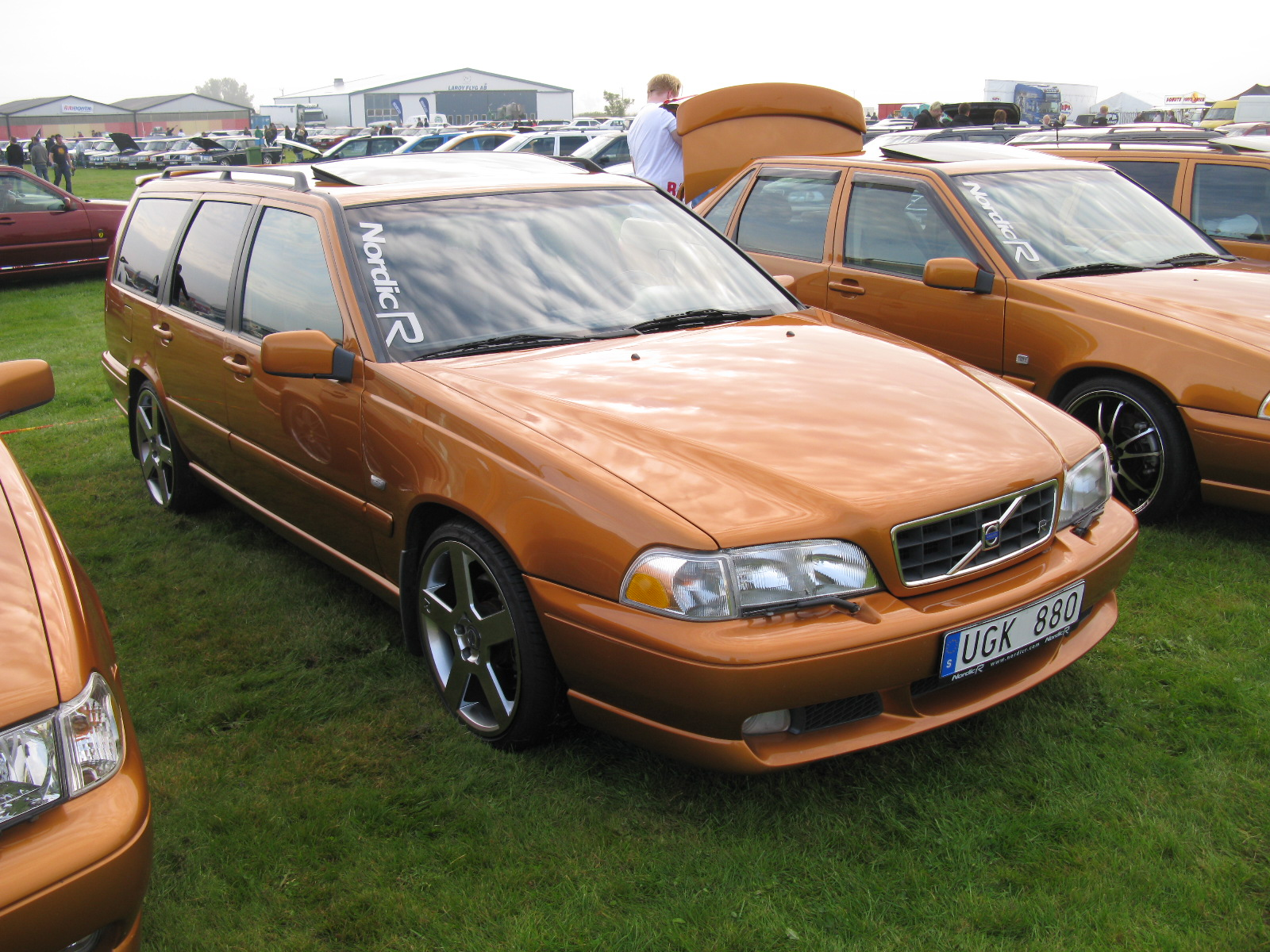
First generation Volvo V70 R

As the replacement for the popular 850 T-5R and 850 R, the V70 R was unveiled in May 1997. Similar to the previous generation R models it featured a unique leather/alcantara interior with diamond stitching on the seats. Further styling touches were a special front bumper, blue gauge faces for the instrument cluster, two special colours and special alloy wheels. All US cars were equipped with 16-inch alloy wheels, other markets had 17-inch wheels available at extra cost or as standard equipment. Standard equipment was substantially upgraded over normal models with a few options available such as a trunk mounted CD-changer, Volvo's self developed Road and Traffic Information (RTI) navigation system, or an upgraded stereo system.

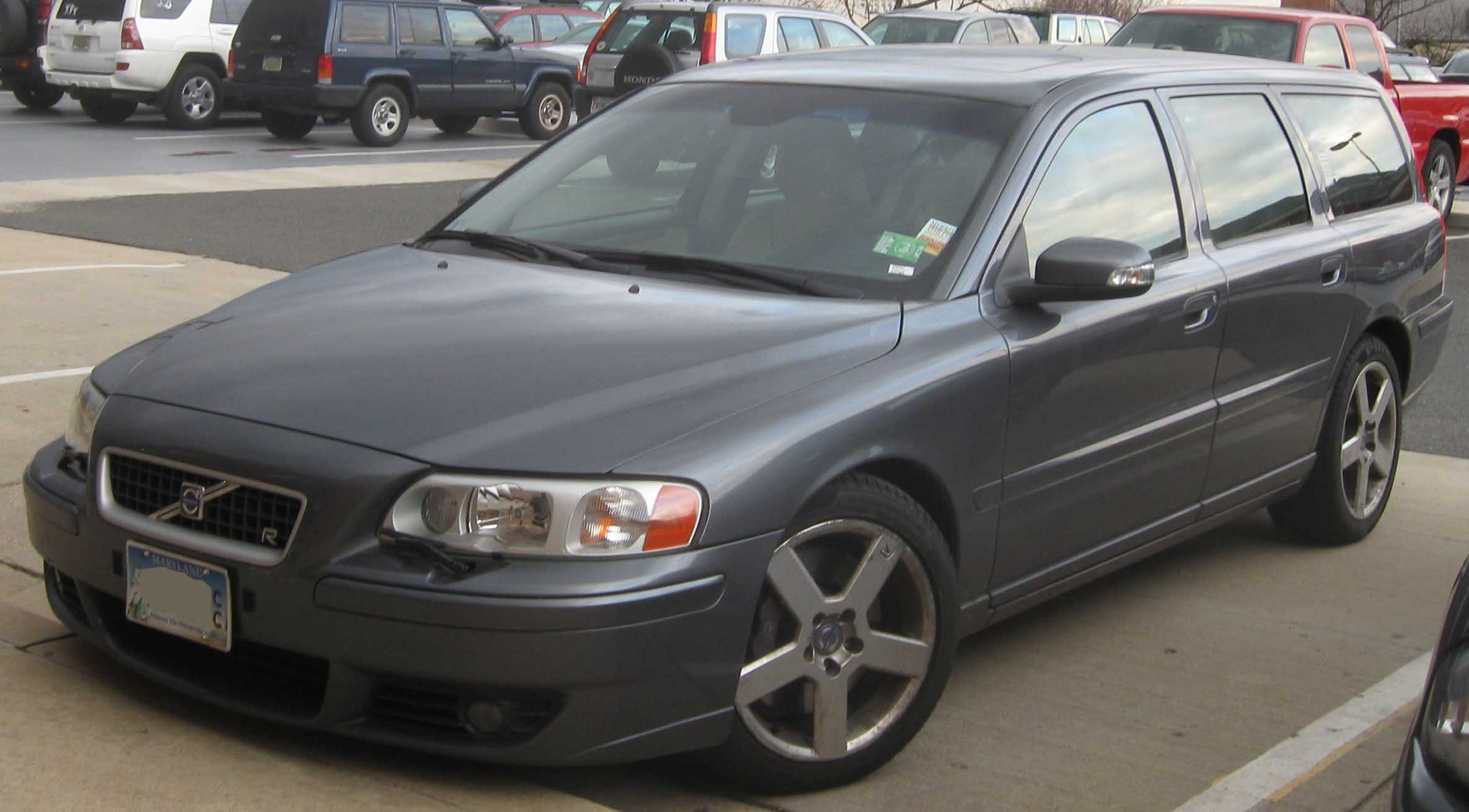
Second generation Volvo V70 R

As with the previous generation, Volvo offered a high-performance variant called the V70 R AWD. Based on the PCC2 concept car from 2001, the model was unveiled at the 2002 Paris Motor Show on 26 September. Released in 2003, the model pioneered many firsts for Volvo. It was only available with a Haldex based all-wheel drive system and a 2.5L turbocharged five cylinder engine rated at 300 metric horsepower (221 kW; 296 hp) and 400 newton-metres (295 lbf⋅ft) of torque. This allowed for a 0–60 mph (0–97 km/h) time of 5.9 seconds. It had an electronically limited top speed of 250 kilometres per hour (155 mph). The R was available with a six-speed manual or a five-speed automatic transmission. The 2005 facelift saw the five-speed automatic replaced by a more modern six-speed unit. Large brakes made by Brembo provided high-performance braking capabilities in line with the car's high-performance characteristics. The V70 R came as standard with Volvo's 4C multi-mode suspension developed with suspension experts Öhlins. The driver could choose from three different settings to vary the car's handling depending on driving style and conditions.

== R-Design ==
In 2008, Volvo began offering an R-Design variant on most of their vehicles, which includes sportier styling on both the exterior and interior, slightly more horsepower, and a firmer suspension. Most R-Design models are designated by an R-Design badge on the right of the grille, as well as silver or black side view mirror caps.

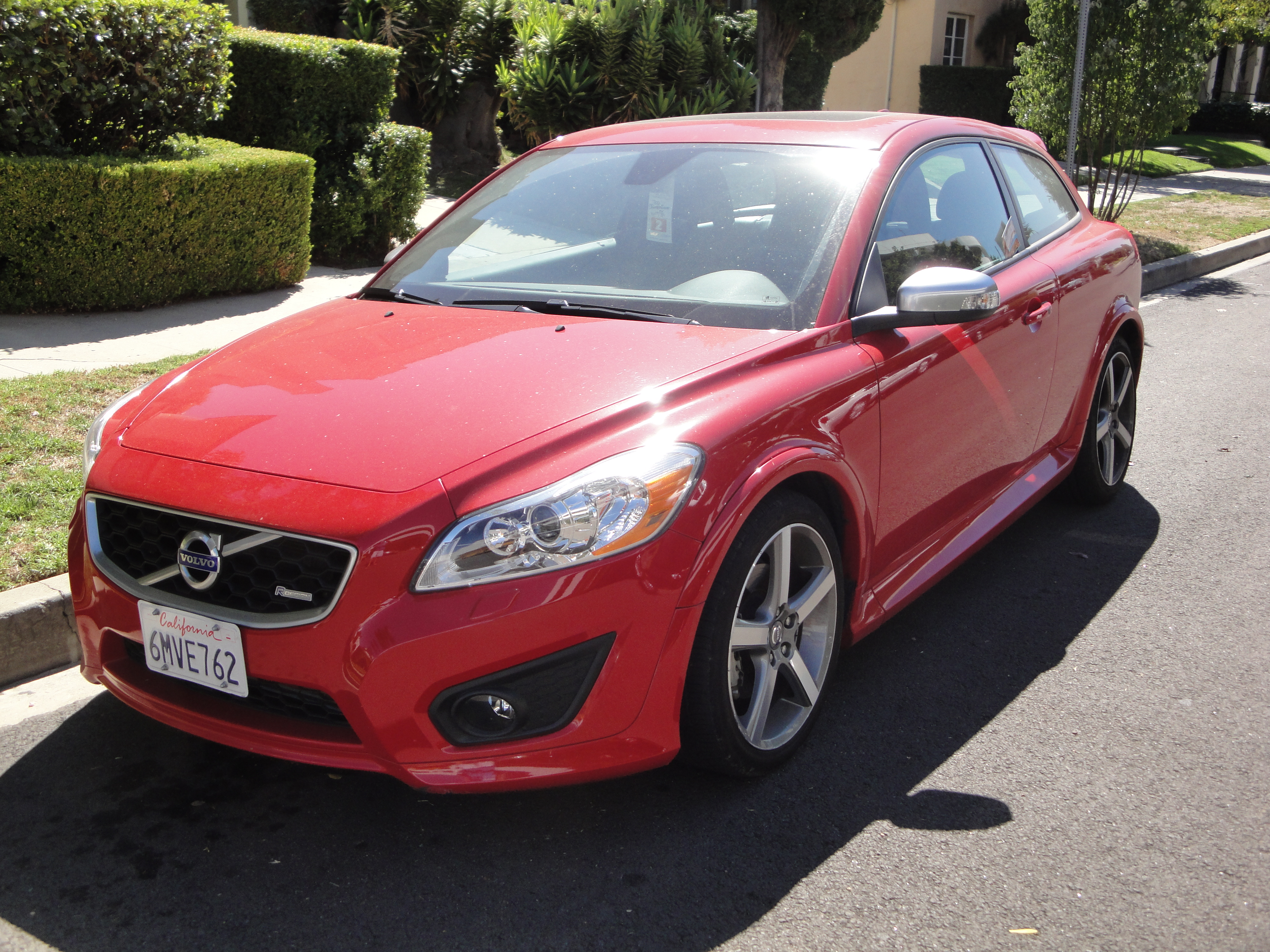
Volvo C30 T5 R-Design

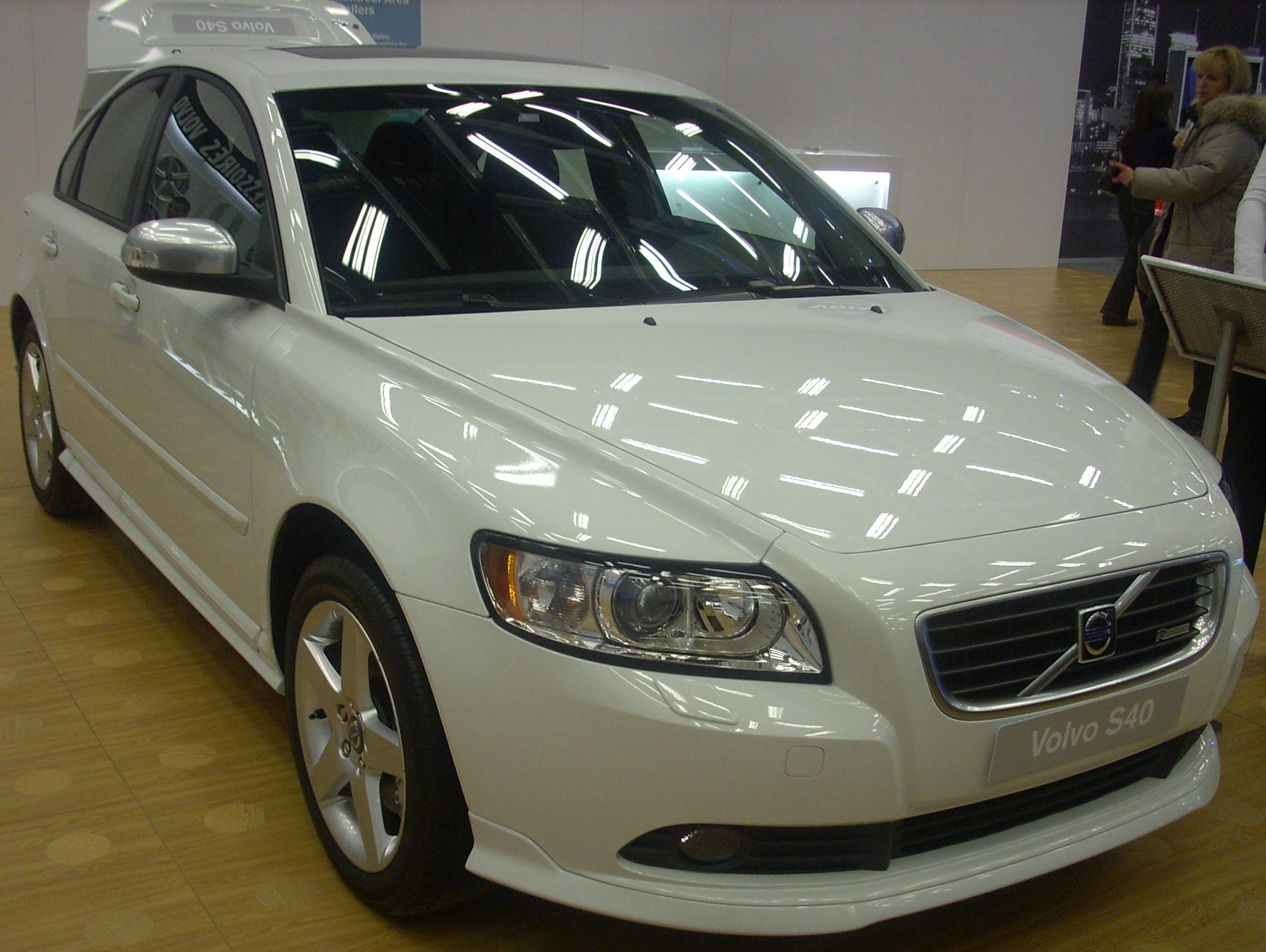
Volvo S40 T5 R-Design

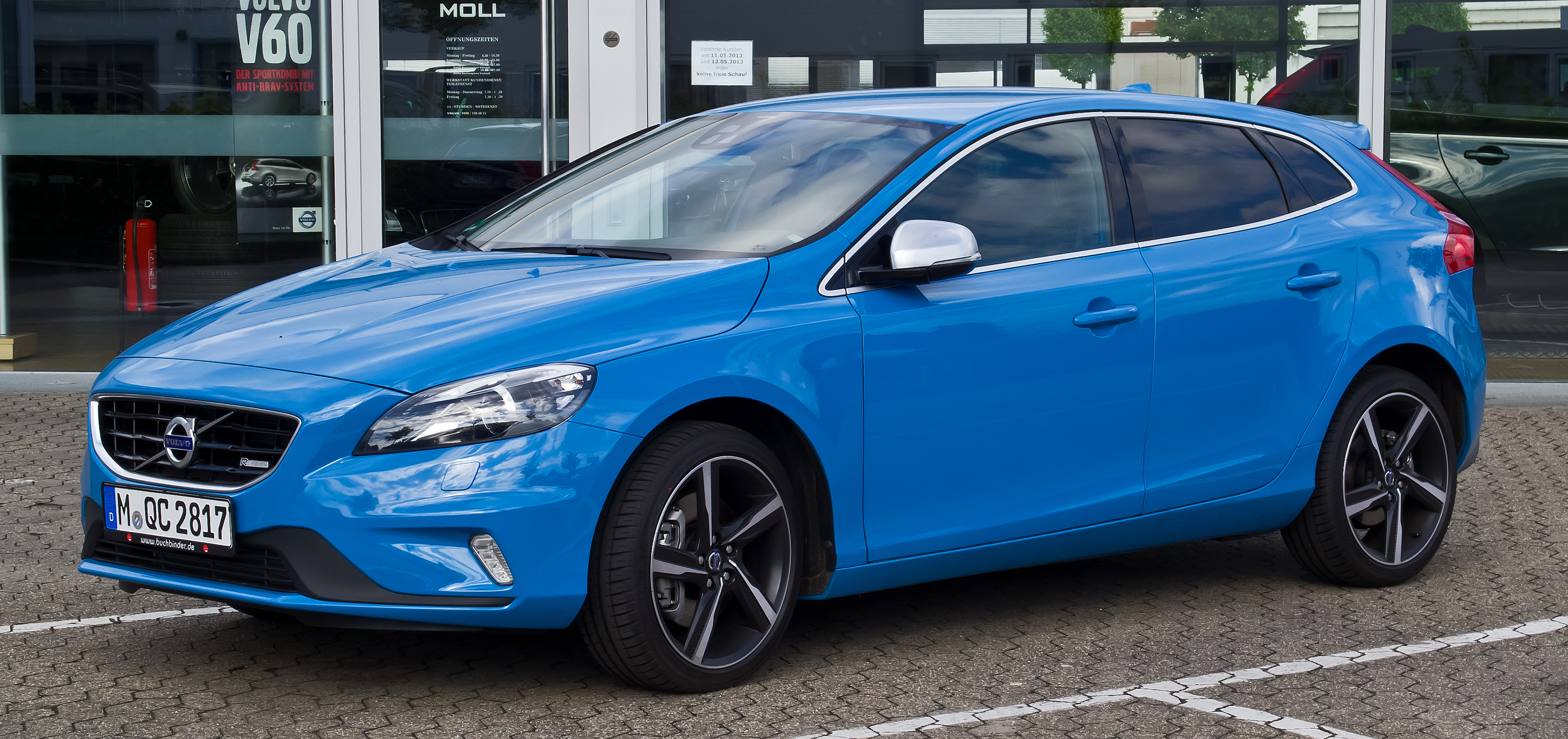
Volvo V40 T4 R-Design

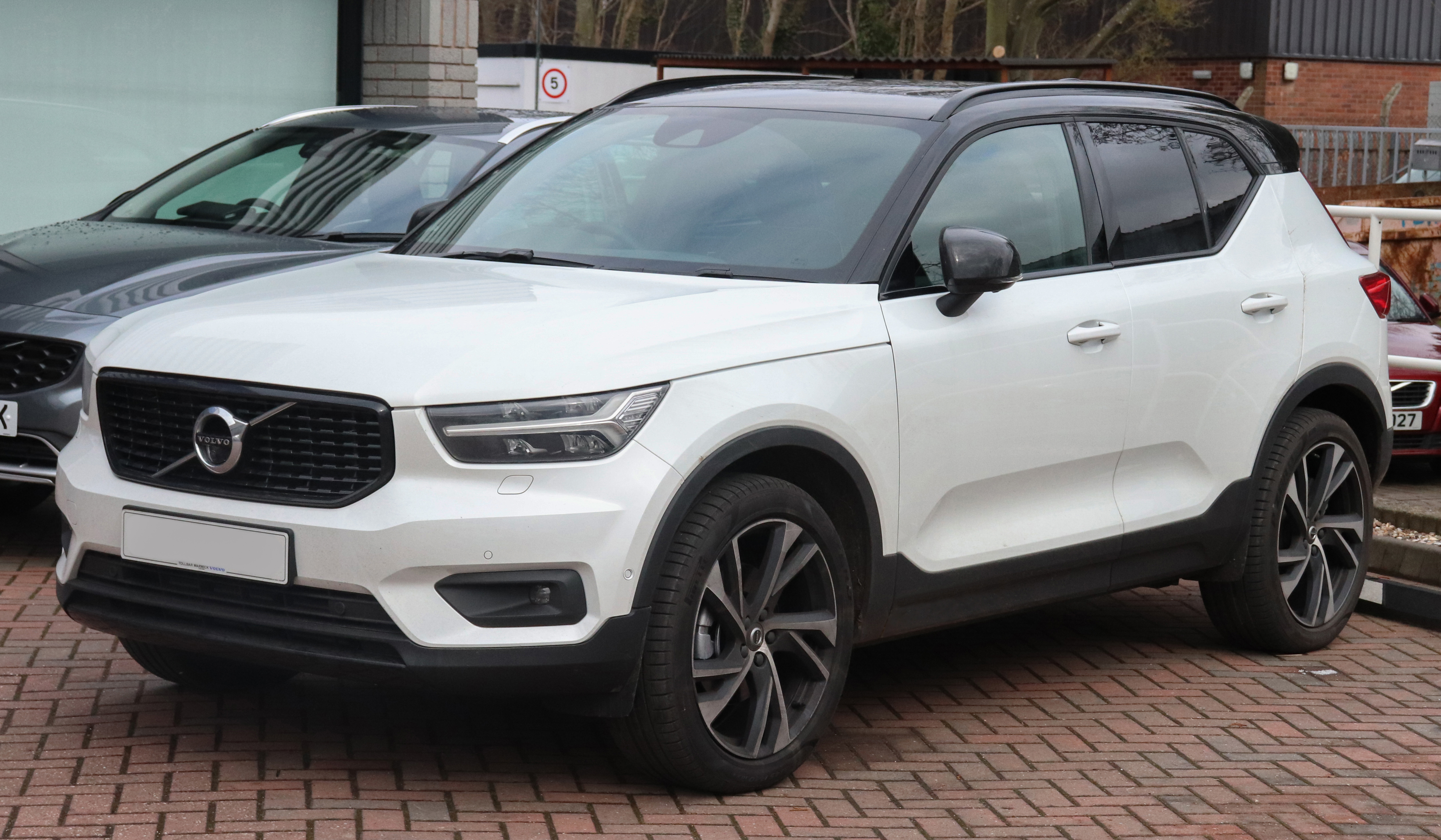
Volvo XC40 T5 R-Design

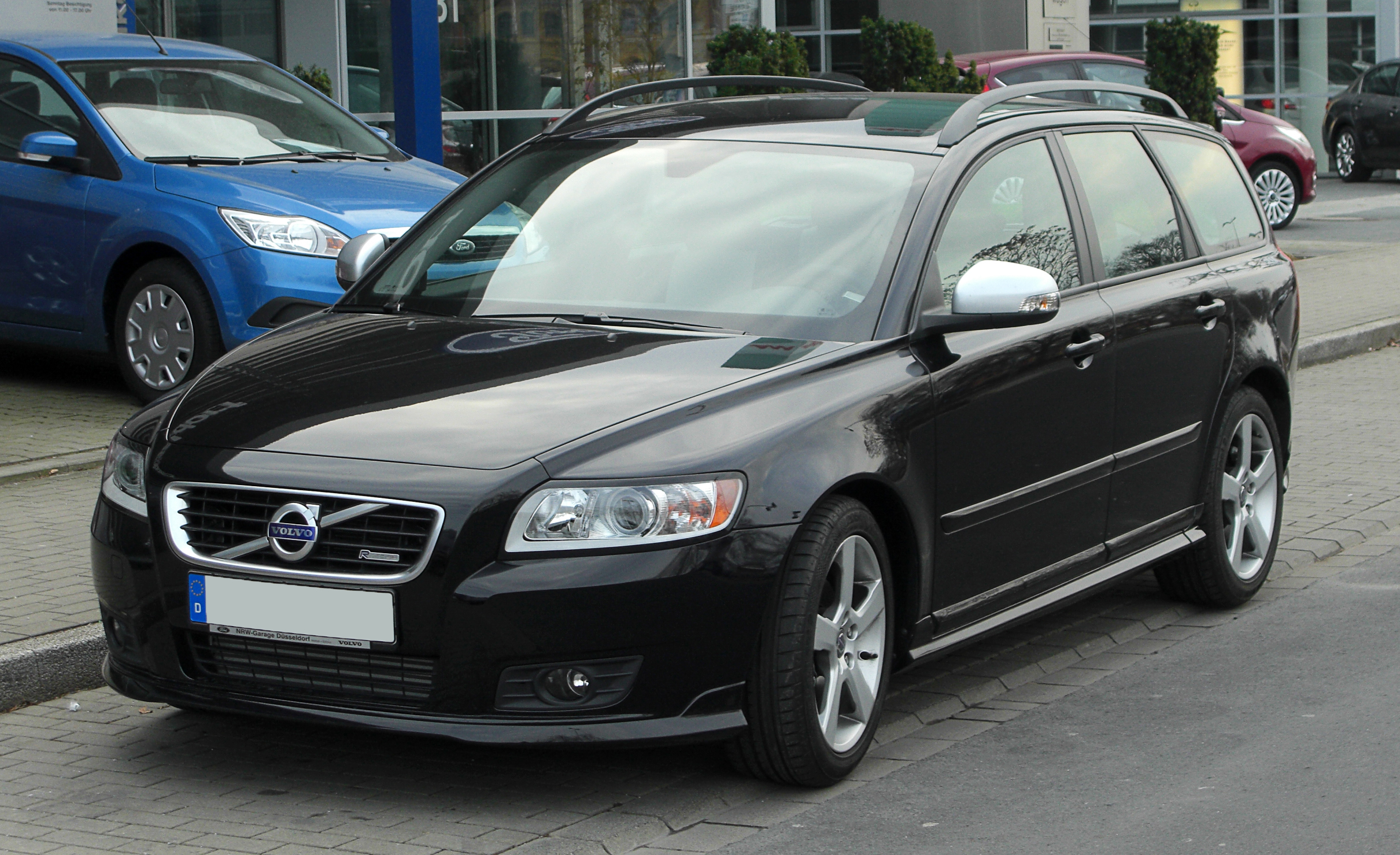
Volvo V50 T5 R-Design

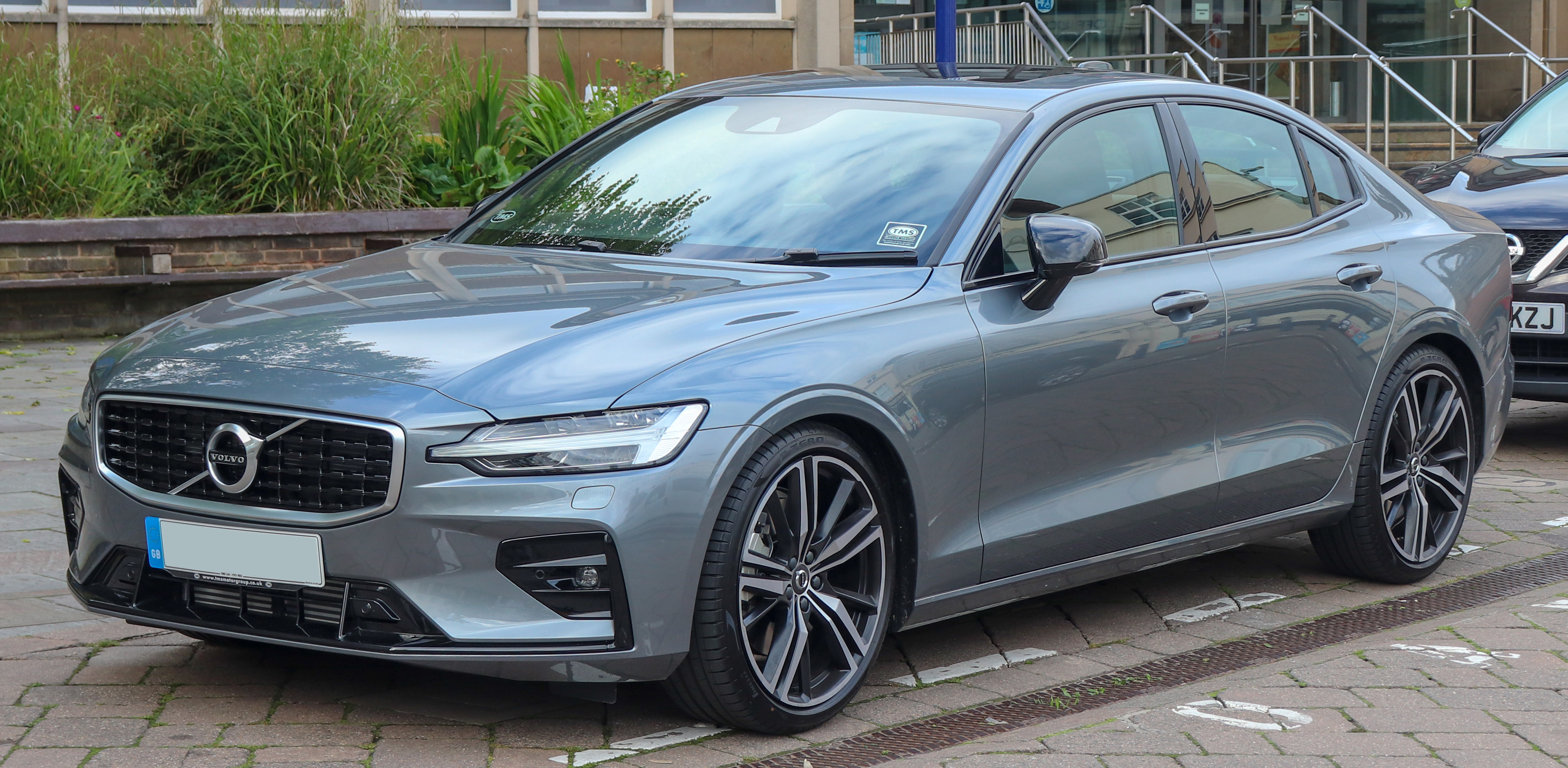
Volvo S60 T5 R-Design

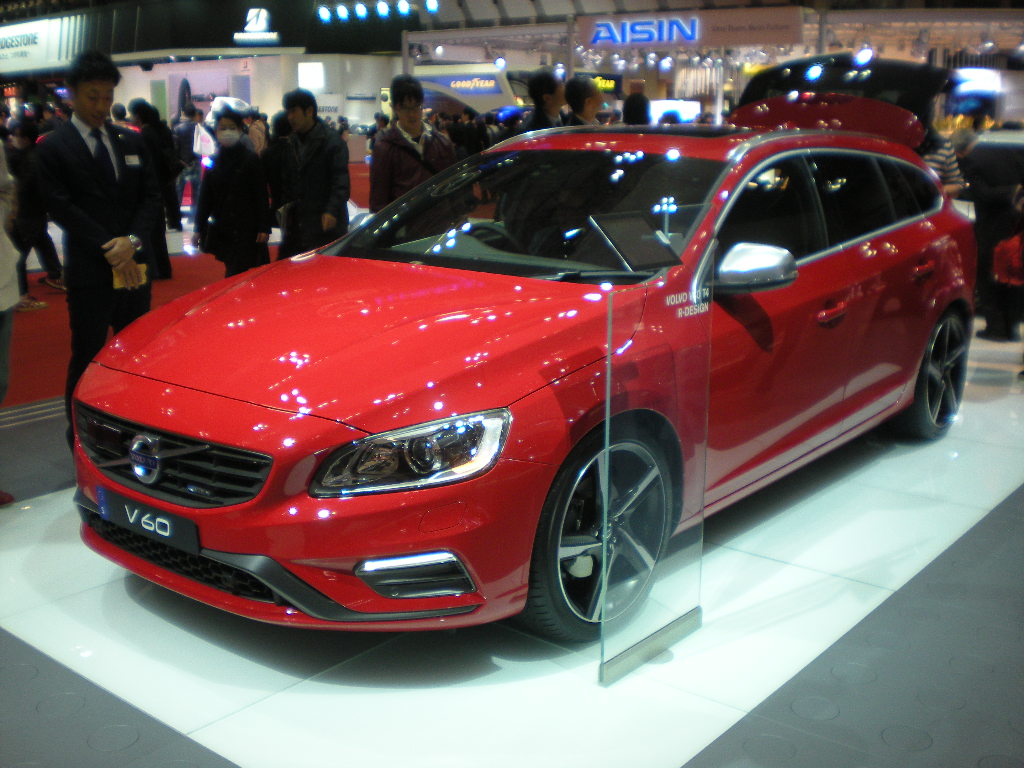
Volvo V60 T4 R-Design

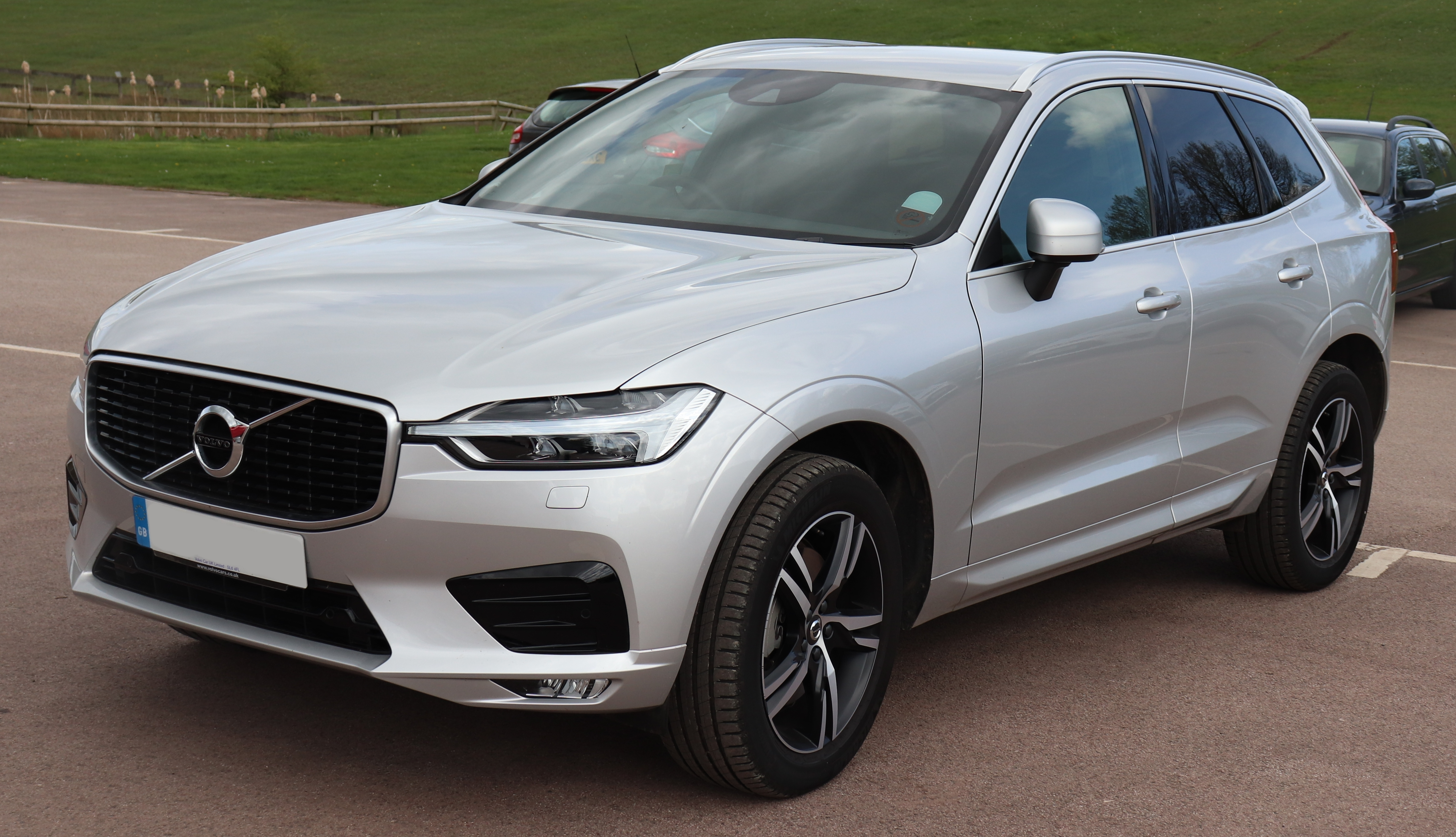
Volvo XC60 D5 R-Design

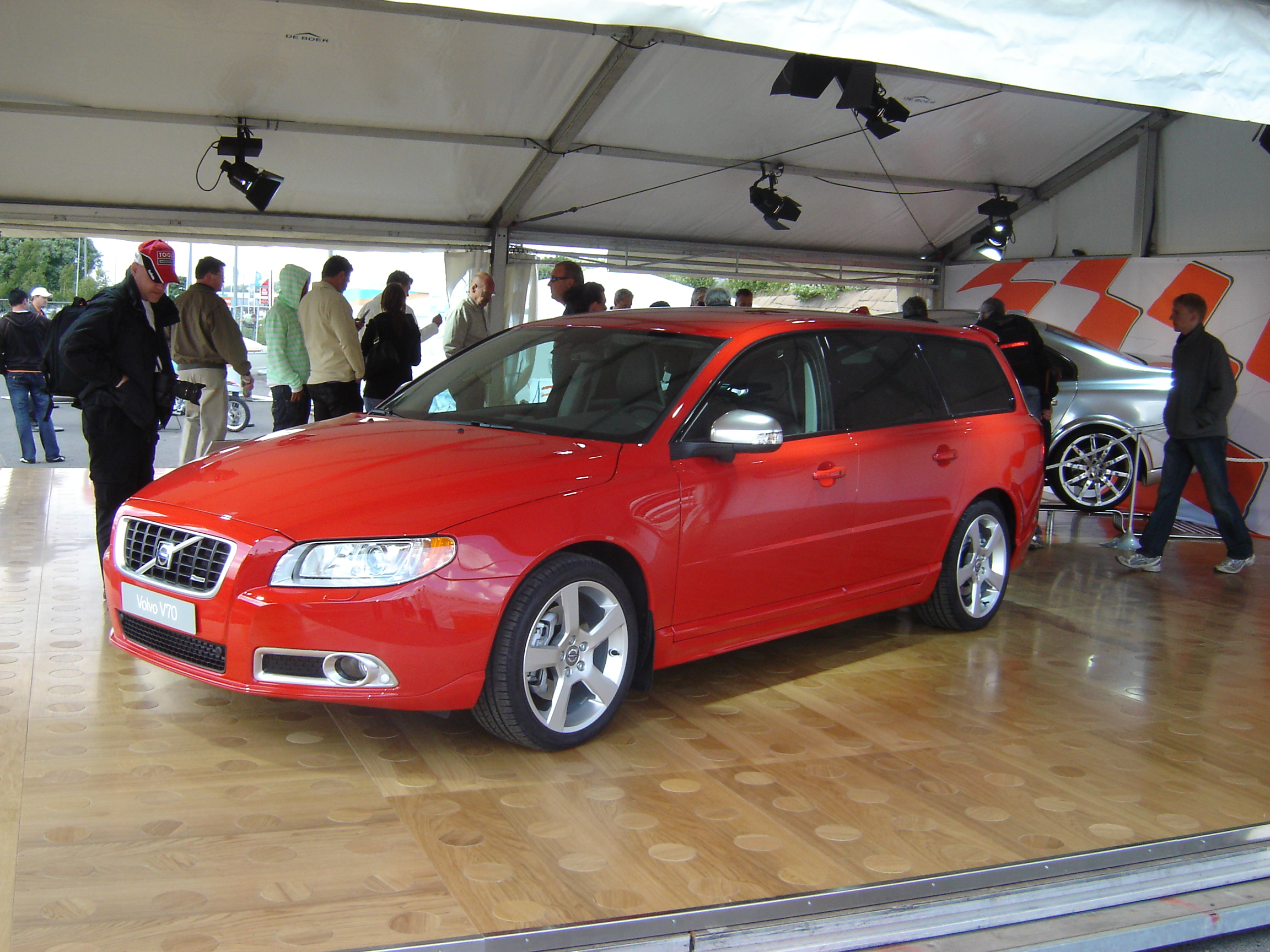
Volvo V70 3.2 R-Design

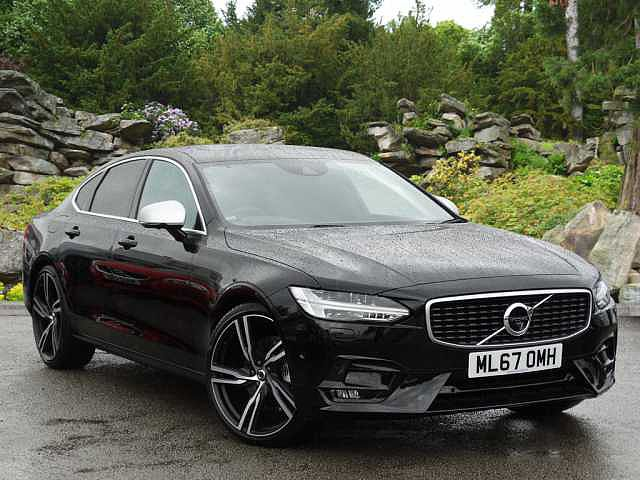
Volvo S90 D4 R-Design

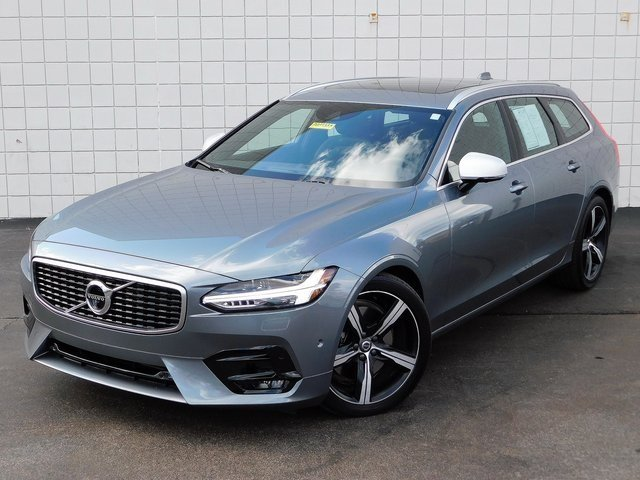
Volvo V90 T6 R-Design

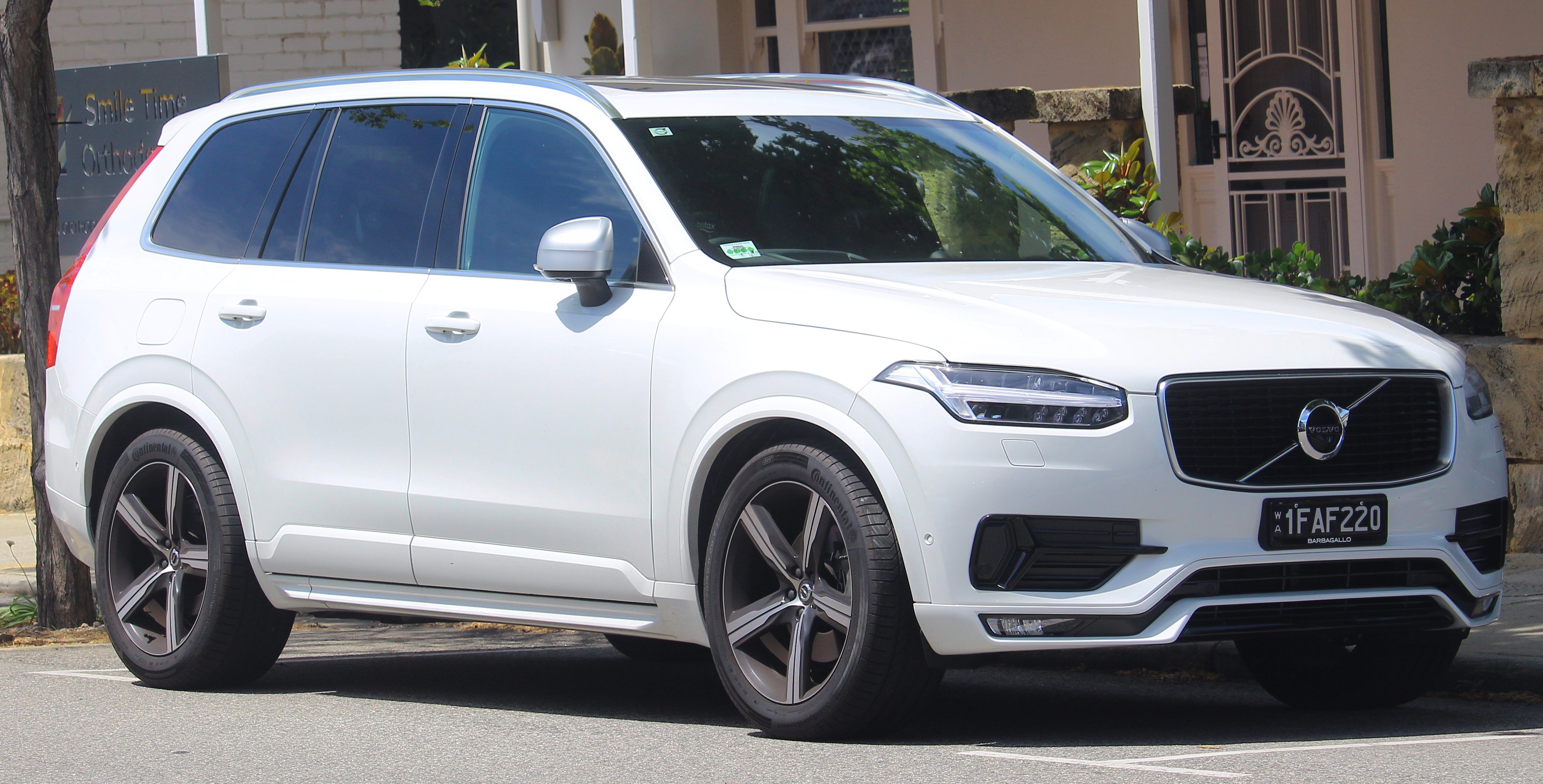
Volvo XC90 T8 R-Design
