= ZF 5HP transmission =

5-speed automatic from 1990

5HP 18 · 5HP 19 · 5HP 30 · 5HP 24

Overview
- Manufacturer: ZF Friedrichshafen
- Production: 1990–2008
- Model years: 1991–2008

Body and chassis
- Class: 5-Speed longitudinal automatic transmission
- Related: MB 5G-Tronic

Chronology
- Predecessor: ZF 4HP transmission family
- Successor: ZF 6HP

5HP is ZF Friedrichshafen AG's trademark name for its 5-speed automatic transmission models (5-speed transmission with Hydraulic converter and Planetary gearsets) for longitudinal engine applications, designed and built by ZF's subsidiary in Saarbrücken.

== Key data ==
Gear ratios (Note: Differences in gear ratios have a measurable, direct impact on vehicle dynamics, performance, waste emissions as well as fuel mileage)
Model	First Deliv- ery	Gear						Total Span			Avg. Step	Components		Nomenclature			
Model	First Deliv- ery	R	1	2	3	4	5	Nomi- nal	Effec- tive	Cen- ter	Avg. Step	Total	per Gear (Note: Forward gears only)	Gears Count	Cou- pling	Gear- sets	Input Shaft Diameter
Ravigneaux types														5	H (Note: Hydraulic torque converter · German: Hydraulischer Wandler oder Drehmomentwandler)	P (Note: Planetary gearing · German: Planetenradsätze)	
5HP 18 5HP 19	1990; 1997	−4.096	3.665	1.995	1.407	1.000	0.742	4.936	4.936	1.650	1.491	3 Gearsets; 3 Brakes; 4 Clutches	2.000	5	H	P	18 mm 19 mm
Simpson types														5	H	P	
5HP 30	1992	−3.684	3.553	2.244	1.545	1.000	0.787	4.517	4.517	1.672	1.458	3 Gearsets; 3 Brakes; 3 Clutches	1.800	5	H	P	30 mm
5HP 24	1996	−4.095	3.571	2.200	1.505	1.000	0.804	4.444	4.444	1.694	1.452	3 Gearsets; 3 Brakes; 3 Clutches	1.800	5	H	P	24 mm

== 1990: 5HP 18 & 1997: 5HP 19 — Ravigneaux planetary gearset types — ==
=== History ===
The Ravigneaux planetary gearset types were ZF's first 5-speed automatic transmission and introduced in 1990. They were produced through 2008 in different versions and were used in a wide range of vehicles. Since the successor model, the 6HP, could be manufactured at a significantly lower cost, most of the gearboxes were replaced shortly after its launch in 2000.

=== Planetary gearset concept ===
==== Improved fuel economy ====
The main objective in replacing the predecessor model was to improve vehicle fuel economy with extra speeds and a wider gear span to allow the engine speed level to be lowered (downspeeding), which is a decisive factor in improving energy efficiency and thus reducing fuel consumption. In addition, the lower engine speed level improves the noise-vibration-harshness comfort and the exterior noise is reduced.

==== Increased manufacturing complexity ====
The 5HP 18 and 19 are a transmission family with purely serial power flow: components were simply added to enable more gears. This makes these transmissions larger, heavier, and more expensive. With 10 main components, progress was unsatisfactory: an obvious transitional solution. It is therefore the last conventionally designed transmission from ZF. All subsequent transmissions from ZF including the 8-speed transmission 8HP require fewer main components.

Planetary gearset concept: manufacturing complexity (Note: Progress increases cost-effectiveness and is reflected in the ratio of forward gears to main components. It depends on the power flow: parallel: using the two degrees of freedom of planetary gearsets; to increase the number of gears; with unchanged number of components; serial: in-line combined planetary gearsets without using the two degrees of freedom; to increase the number of gears; a corresponding increase in the number of components is unavoidable)
With Assessment	Output: Gear Ratios	Innovation Elasticity (Note: Innovation elasticity classifies progress and market position: Automobile manufacturers drive forward technical developments primarily in order to remain competitive or to achieve or defend technological leadership. This technical progress has therefore always been subject to economic constraints; Only innovations whose relative additional benefit is greater than the relative additional resource input, i.e. whose economic elasticity is greater than 1, are considered for realization; The required innovation elasticity of an automobile manufacturer depends on its expected return on investment. The basic assumption that the relative additional benefit must be at least twice as high as the relative additional resource input helps with orientation; negative, if the output increases and the input decreases, is perfect; 2 or above is good; 1 or above is acceptable (red); below this is unsatisfactory (bold)) Δ Output : Δ Input	Input: Main Components			
With Assessment	Output: Gear Ratios	Innovation Elasticity Δ Output : Δ Input	Total	Gearsets	Brakes	Clutches
5HP 18/19 Ref. Object	$n_{O1}$ $n_{O2}$	Topic	$n_I= n_G+$ $n_B+ n_C$	$n_{G1}$ $n_{G2}$	$n_{B1}$ $n_{B2}$	$n_{C1}$ $n_{C2}$
Δ Number	$n_{O1}- n_{O2}$	Topic	$n_{I1}- n_{I2}$	$n_{G1}- n_{G2}$	$n_{B1}- n_{B2}$	$n_{C1}- n_{C2}$
Relative Δ	Δ Output $\tfrac{n_{O1}- n_{O2}} {n_{O2}}$	$\tfrac{n_{O1}- n_{O2}} {n_{O2}}: \tfrac{n_{I1}- n_{I2}} {n_{I2}}$ $=\tfrac{n_{O1}- n_{O2}} {n_{O2}}$·$\tfrac{n_{I2}} {n_{I1}- n_{I2}}$	Δ Input $\tfrac{n_{I1}- n_{I2}} {n_{I2}}$	$\tfrac{n_{G1}- n_{G2}} {n_{G2}}$	$\tfrac{n_{B1}- n_{B2}} {n_{B2}}$	$\tfrac{n_{C1}- n_{C2}} {n_{C2}}$
5HP 18/19 4HP 14/16/18 (Note: Direct predecessor: To reflect the progress of the specific model change)	5 (Note: plus 1 reverse gear); 4	Progress	10; 7	3 (Note: of which 2 gearsets are combined as a compound Ravigneaux gearset); 2	3; 2	4; 3
Δ Number	1	Progress	3	1	1	1
Relative Δ	0.250 $\tfrac{1} {4}$	0.583 $\tfrac{1} {4}: \tfrac{3} {7}= \tfrac{1} {4}$·$\tfrac{7} {3}= \tfrac{7} {12}$	0.429 $\tfrac{3} {7}$	0.500 $\tfrac{1} {2}$	0.500 $\tfrac{1} {2}$	0.333 $\tfrac{1} {3}$
5HP 18/19 4HP 20/22/24	5; 4	Progress	10; 10	3; 3	3; 4	4; 3
Δ Number	1	Progress	0	0	–1	1
Relative Δ	0.250 $\tfrac{1} {4}$	∞ $\tfrac{1} {4}: \tfrac{0} {10}= \tfrac{1} {4}$·$\tfrac{10} {0}= \tfrac{10} {0}$	0.000 $\tfrac{0} {10}$	0.000 $\tfrac{0} {3}$	−0.250 $\tfrac{-1} {4}$	0.333 $\tfrac{1} {3}$
5HP 18/19 3-Speed (Note: Reference standard (benchmark): 3-speed transmissions with torque converters have established the modern market for automatic transmissions and thus made it possible in the first place, as this design proved to be a particularly successful compromise between cost and performance; It became the archetype and dominated the world market for around 3 decades, setting the standard for automatic transmissions. It was only when fuel consumption became the focus of interest that this design reached its limits, which is why it has now completely disappeared from the market; What has remained is the orientation that it offers as a reference standard (point of reference, benchmark) for this market for determining progressiveness and thus the market position of all other, later designs; All transmission variants consist of 7 main components; Typical examples are; Turbo-Hydramatic from GM; Cruise-O-Matic from Ford; TorqueFlite from Chrysler; Detroit Gear from BorgWarner for Studebaker; BW-35 from BorgWarner and as T35 from Aisin; 3N 71 from Nissan/Jatco; 3 HP from ZF Friedrichshafen; W3A 040 and W3B 050 from Mercedes-Benz)	5; 3	Market Position	10; 7	3; 2	3; 3	4; 2
Δ Number	2	Market Position	3	1	0	2
Relative Δ	0.667 $\tfrac{2} {3}$	1.556 $\tfrac{2} {3}: \tfrac{3} {7}= \tfrac{2} {3}$·$\tfrac{7} {3}= \tfrac{14} {9}$	0.429 $\tfrac{3} {7}$	0.500 $\tfrac{1} {2}$	0.000 $\tfrac{0} {3}$	1.000 $\tfrac{2} {2}$

==== Quality ====
Planetary gearset concept: gear ratio quality (Note: Revised 14 January 2026 Nomenclature: $S_n =$ sun gear: number of teeth; $R_n =$ ring gear: number of teeth; $\color{gray}{C_n = }$ carrier or planetary gear carrier (not needed); $s_n =$ sun gear: shaft speed; $r_n =$ ring gear: shaft speed; $c_n =$ carrier or planetary gear carrier: shaft speed; With $n =$ gear is: $i_n =$ gear ratio or transmission ratio; $\omega_{1;n} = \omega_t =$ shaft speed shaft 1: input (turbine) shaft; $\omega_{2;n} =$ shaft speed shaft 2: output shaft; $T_{1;n} = T_t =$ torque shaft 1: input (turbine) shaft; $T_{2;n} =$ torque shaft 2: output shaft; $\mu_n =$ torque ratio or torque conversion ratio; $\eta_n =$ efficiency; $i_0 =$ stationary gear ratio; $\eta_0 =$ (assumed) stationary gear efficiency)
In-Depth Analysis (Note: Gear ratio (transmission ratio) $i_n$ — speed conversion —: The gear ratio $i_n$ is the ratio of; input shaft speed $\omega_{1;n}$; to output shaft speed $\omega_{2;n}$; and therefore corresponds to the reciprocal of the shaft speeds; $i_n = \frac{1} {\frac{\omega_{2;n}} {\omega_{1;n}}} = \frac{\omega_{1;n}} {\omega_{2;n}} = \frac{\omega_t} {\omega_{2;n}}$) With Assessment And Torque Ratio (Note: Torque ratio (torque conversion ratio) $\mu_n$ — torque conversion —: The torque ratio $\mu_n$ is the ratio of; output torque $T_{2;n}$; to input torque $T_{1;n}$; minus efficiency losses; and therefore corresponds (apart from the efficiency losses) to the reciprocal of the shaft speeds too; $\mu_n = i_n \eta_{n;\eta_0} = \frac{\omega_{1;n} \eta_{n;\eta_0}} {\omega_{2;n}} = \frac{T_{2;n} \eta_{n;\eta_0}} {T_{1;n}}$; whereby $\eta_{n;\eta_0}$ may vary from gear to gear according to the formulas listed in this table and $0 \le \eta_{n;\eta_0} \le 1$) And Efficiency Calculation (Note: Efficiency: The efficiency $\eta_n$ is calculated; from the torque ratio; in relation to the gear ratio (transmission ratio); $\eta_n = \frac{\mu_n} {i_n}$; Power loss for single meshing gears; is in the range of 1 % to 1.5 %; helical gear pairs, which are used to reduce noise in passenger cars, are in the upper part of the loss range; spur gear pairs, which are limited to commercial vehicles due to their poorer noise comfort, are in the lower part of the loss range; Corridor for torque ratio and efficiency: in planetary gearsets, the stationary gear ratio $i_0$ is formed via the planetary gears and thus by two meshes; for reasons of simplification, the efficiency for both meshes together is commonly specified there; the efficiencies $\eta_0$ specified here are based on assumed efficiencies for the stationary ratio $i_0$; of $\eta_0 = 0.9800$ (upper value); and $\eta_0 = 0.9700$ (lower value); for both interventions together; The corresponding efficiency; for single-meshing gear pairs is ${\eta_0}^\tfrac {1}{2}$; at $0.9800^\tfrac{1} {2} = 0.98995$ (upper value); and $0.9700^\tfrac{1} {2} = 0.98489$ (lower value))		Planetary Gearset: Teeth (Note: Layout: Input and output are on opposite sides; Planetary gearset 2 (the outer Ravigneaux gearset) is on the input (turbine) side; Input (turbine) shafts are, if actuated, S_{1}, C_{1}/C_{2} (the common carrier of the compound Ravigneaux gearset), and R_{1}/S_{2}; Output shaft is C_{3})			Count	Nomi- nal (Note: Total ratio span (total gear ratio/total transmission ratio) nominal: $\frac{\omega_{2;n}} {\omega_{2;1}} = \frac{\frac{\omega_{2;n}} {\omega_{2;1} \omega_{2;n}}} {\frac{\omega_{2;1}} {\omega_{2;1} \omega_{2;n}}} = \frac{\frac{1} {\omega_{2;1}}} {\frac{1} {\omega_{2;n}}} = \frac{\frac{\omega_t} {\omega_{2;1}}} {\frac{\omega_t} {\omega_{2;n}}} = \frac{i_1} {i_n}$; A wider span enables the; downspeeding when driving outside the city limits; increase the climbing ability; when driving over mountain passes or off-road; or when towing a trailer) Effec- tive (Note: Total ratio span (total gear ratio/total transmission ratio) effective: $\frac{\omega_{2;n}} {max(\omega_{2;1};|\omega_{2;R}|)} = \frac{min(i_1;|i_R|)} {i_n}$; The span is only effective to the extent that; the reverse gear ratio; matches that of 1st gear; see also Standard R:1; Digression Reverse gear: is usually longer than 1st gear; the effective span is therefore of central importance for describing the suitability of a transmission; because in these cases, the nominal spread conveys a misleading picture; which is only unproblematic for vehicles with high specific power; Market participants: Manufacturers naturally have no interest in specifying the effective span; Users have not yet formulated the practical benefits that the effective span has for them; The effective span has not yet played a role in research and teaching; Contrary to its significance: the effective span has therefore not yet been able to establish itself; either in theory; or in practice.; End of digression)	Cen- ter (Note: Ratio span's center: $(i_1 i_n)^\frac{1} {2}$; The center indicates the speed level of the transmission; Together with the final drive ratio; it gives the shaft speed level of the vehicle)
In-Depth Analysis With Assessment And Torque Ratio And Efficiency Calculation		Ravigneaux		Simple	Count	Nomi- nal Effec- tive	Avg. (Note: Average gear step: $\left( \frac{\omega_{2;n}} {\omega_{2;1}} \right) ^\frac{1} {n-1} = \left( \frac{i_1} {i_n} \right) ^\frac{1} {n-1}$; There are $n-1$ gear steps between $n$ gears; with decreasing step width; the gears connect better to each other; shifting comfort increases)
Model Type	Version First Delivery	S_{1} (Note: Sun 1: sun gear of gearset 1: inner Ravigneaux gearset) R_{1} (Note: Ring 1: ring gear of gearset 1: inner Ravigneaux gearset)	S_{2} (Note: Sun 2: sun gear of gearset 2: outer Ravigneaux gearset) R_{2} (Note: Ring 2: ring gear of gearset 2: outer Ravigneaux gearset)	S_{3} (Note: Sun 3: sun gear of gearset 3) R_{3} (Note: Ring 3: ring gear of gearset 3)	Brakes Clutches	Ratio Span	Gear Step (Note: Standard 50:50 — 50 % is above and 50 % is below the average gear step —: With steadily decreasing gear steps (yellow highlighted line Step); and a particularly large step from 1st to 2nd gear; the lower half of the gear steps (between the small gears; rounded down, here the first 2) is always larger; and the upper half of the gear steps (between the large gears; rounded up, here the last 2) is always smaller; than the average gear step (cell highlighted yellow two rows above on the far right); lower half: smaller gear steps are a waste of possible ratios (red bold); upper half: larger gear steps are unsatisfactory (red bold))
Gear	R		1	2	3	4	5
Gear Ratio	${i_R}$		${i_1}$	${i_2}$	${i_3}$	${i_4}$	${i_5}$
Step	$-\frac{i_R} {i_1}$ (Note: Standard R:1 — reverse and 1st gear have the same ratio —: The ideal reverse gear has the same transmission ratio as 1st gear; no impairment when maneuvering; especially when towing a trailer; a torque converter can only partially compensate for this deficiency; Plus 11.11 % minus 10 % compared to 1st gear is good; Plus 25 % minus 20 % is acceptable (red); Above this is unsatisfactory (bold); see also Total ratio span (total gear ratio/total transmission ratio) effective)		$\frac{i_1} {i_1}$	$\frac{i_1} {i_2}$ (Note: Standard 1:2 — gear step 1st to 2nd gear as small as possible —: With continuously decreasing gear steps (yellow marked line Step); the largest gear step is the one from 1st to 2nd gear, which; for a good speed connection and; a smooth gear shift; must be as small as possible; A gear ratio of up to 1.6667 : 1 (5 : 3) is good; Up to 1.7500 : 1 (7 : 4) is acceptable (red); Above is unsatisfactory (bold))	$\frac{i_2} {i_3}$	$\frac{i_3} {i_4}$	$\frac{i_4} {i_5}$
Δ Step (Note: From large to small gears (from right to left)) (Note: Standard STEP — from large to small gears: steady and progressive increase in gear steps —: Gear steps should; increase: Δ Step (first green highlighted line Δ Step) is always greater than 1; As progressive as possible: Δ Step is always greater than the previous step; Not progressively increasing is acceptable (red); Not increasing is unsatisfactory (bold))				$\tfrac{i_1} {i_2} : \tfrac{i_2} {i_3}$	$\tfrac{i_2} {i_3} : \tfrac{i_3} {i_4}$	$\tfrac{i_3} {i_4} : \tfrac{i_4} {i_5}$	
Shaft Speed	$\frac{i_1} {i_R}$		$\frac{i_1} {i_1}$	$\frac{i_1} {i_2}$	$\frac{i_1} {i_3}$	$\frac{i_1} {i_4}$	$\frac{i_1} {i_5}$
Δ Shaft Speed (Note: Standard SPEED — from small to large gears: steady increase in shaft speed difference —: Shaft speed differences should; increase: Δ Shaft Speed (second line marked in green Δ (Shaft) Speed) is always greater than the previous one; 1 difference smaller than the previous one is acceptable (red); 2 consecutive ones are a waste of possible ratios (bold))	$0 - \tfrac{i_1} {i_R}$		$\tfrac{i_1} {i_1} - 0$	$\tfrac{i_1} {i_2} - \tfrac{i_1} {i_1}$	$\tfrac{i_1} {i_3} - \tfrac{i_1} {i_2}$	$\tfrac{i_1} {i_4} - \tfrac{i_1} {i_3}$	$\tfrac{i_1} {i_5} - \tfrac{i_1} {i_4}$
Torque Ratio	$\mu_R$		$\mu_1$	$\mu_2$	$\mu_3$	$\mu_4$	$\mu_5$
Efficiency $\eta_n$	$\frac{\mu_R} {i_R}$		$\frac{\mu_1} {i_1}$	$\frac{\mu_2} {i_2}$	$\frac{\mu_3} {i_3}$	$\frac{\mu_4} {i_4}$	$\frac{\mu_5} {i_5}$
5HP 18	310 N⋅m (229 lb⋅ft); 1990	38; 34 (Note: inner and outer sun gears of the Ravigneaux planetary gearset are inverted)	34; 98	32; 76	3; 4	4.9363; 4.9363	1.6495
5HP 18	310 N⋅m (229 lb⋅ft); 1990	38; 34	34; 98	32; 76	3; 4	4.9363; 4.9363	1.4906
Gear	R		1	2	3	4	5
Gear Ratio	−4.0960 $-\tfrac{1,323}{323}$		3.6648 $\tfrac{1,323}{361}$	1.9990 $\tfrac{7,938}{3,971}$	1.4067 $\tfrac{294}{209}$	1.0000 $\tfrac{1}{1}$	0.7424 $\tfrac{49}{66}$
Step	1.1176		1.0000	1.8333	1.4211	1.4067	1.3469
Δ Step				1.2901	1.0102	1.0444	
Speed	–0.8947		1.0000	1.8333	2.6053	3.6648	4.9363
Δ Speed	0.8947		1.0000	0.8333	0.7719	1.0596	1.2715
Torque Ratio	–3.9903 –3.9378		3.5344; 3.4700	1.9581; 1.9377	1.3861; 1.3758	1.0000	0.7385; 0.7366
Efficiency $\eta_n$	0.9742; 0.9614		0.9644; 0.9468	0.9795; 0.9693	0.9854; 0.9780	1.0000	0.9948; 0.9921
5HP 19	325 N⋅m (240 lb⋅ft); 1997	38; 34	34; 98	32; 76	3; 4	4.9363; 4.9363	1.6495
5HP 19	325 N⋅m (240 lb⋅ft); 1997	38; 34	34; 98	32; 76	3; 4	4.9363; 4.9363	1.4906
Gear	R		1	2	3	4	5
Gear Ratio	−4.0960		3.6648	1.9990	1.4067	1.0000	0.7424
Actuated shift elements
Brake A (Note: Blocks R_{1} (ring gear of the inner Ravigneaux gearset) and S_{2} (sun gear of the outer Ravigneaux gearset))				❶	❶		❶
Brake B (Note: Blocks C_{1}/C_{2} (the common carrier of the compound Ravigneaux gearset))	❶		❶				
Brake C (Note: Blocks S_{3})	❶		❶	❶			
Clutch D (Note: Couples S_{1} (sun of the inner Ravigneaux gearset) with the input (turbine))			❶	❶	❶	❶	
Clutch E (Note: Couples R_{1} (ring gear of the inner Ravigneaux gearset) and S_{2} (sun gear of the outer Ravigneaux gearset) with the input (turbine))	❶						
Clutch F (Note: Connects C_{1}/C_{2} (the common carrier of the compound Ravigneaux gearset) with the input (turbine))						❶	❶
Clutch G (Note: Couples S_{3} with R_{3})					❶	❶	❶
Geometric ratios: speed conversion
Gear Ratio R & 1 Ordinary (Note: Ordinary noted: For direct determination of the gear ratio) Elementary Noted (Note: Elementary noted: Alternative representation for determining the transmission ratio; Contains only operands; With simple fractions of both central gears of a planetary gearset; Or with the value 1; As a basis; For reliable; And traceable; Determination of torque conversion ratio and efficiency)	$i_R = -\frac{R_2 (S_3+ R_3)} {S_2 R_3}$			$i_1 = \frac{R_1 R_2 (S_3+ R_3)} {S_1 S_2 R_3}$			
Gear Ratio R & 1 Ordinary Elementary Noted	$i_R = -\tfrac{R_2} {S_2} \left(1+ \tfrac{S_3} {R_3} \right)$			$i_1 = \tfrac{R_1 R_2} {S_1 S_2} \left(1+ \tfrac{S_3} {R_3} \right)$			
Gear Ratio 2 & 3 Ordinary Elementary Noted	$i_2 = \frac{R_2 (S_1+ R_1) (S_3+ R_3)} {S_1 R_3 (S_2+ R_2)}$				$i_3 = \frac{R_2 (S_1+ R_1)} {S_1 (S_2+ R_2)}$		
Gear Ratio 2 & 3 Ordinary Elementary Noted	$i_2 = \tfrac{\left(1+ \tfrac{R_1} {S_1} \right) \left(1+ \tfrac{S_3} {R_3} \right)} {1+ \tfrac{S_2} {R_2}}$				$i_3 = \tfrac{1+ \tfrac{R_1} {S_1}} {1+ \tfrac{S_2} {R_2}}$		
Gear Ratio 4 & 5 Ordinary Elementary Noted	$i_4 = \frac{1} {1}$			$i_5 = \frac{R_2} {S_2+ R_2}$			
Gear Ratio 4 & 5 Ordinary Elementary Noted	$i_4 = \frac{1} {1}$			$i_5 = \tfrac{1} {1+ \tfrac{S_2} {R_2}}$			
Kinetic ratios: torque conversion
Torque Ratio R & 1	$\mu_R = -\tfrac{R_2} {S_2} \eta_0 \left(1+ \tfrac{S_3} {R_3} \eta_0 \right)$			$\mu_1 = \tfrac{R_1 R_2} {S_1 S_2} {\eta_0}^\tfrac{3} {2} \left(1+ \tfrac{S_3} {R_3} \eta_0 \right)$			
Torque Ratio 2 & 3	$\mu_2 = \tfrac{ \left(1+ \tfrac{R_1} {S_1} \eta_0 \right) \left(1+ \tfrac{S_3} {R_3} \eta_0 \right)} {1+ \tfrac{S_2} {R_2} \cdot \tfrac{1} {\eta_0}}$				$\mu_3 = \tfrac{1+ \tfrac{R_1} {S_1} \eta_0} {1+ \tfrac{S_2} {R_2} \cdot \tfrac{1} {\eta_0}}$		
Torque Ratio 4 & 5	$\mu_4 = \tfrac{1} {1}$			$\mu_5 = \tfrac{1} {1+ \tfrac{S_2} {R_2} \cdot \tfrac{1} {\eta_0}}$			

== 1992: 5HP 30 & 1996: 5HP 24 — Simpson planetary gearset types — ==
=== History ===
The Simpson planetary gearset types were ZF's second 5-speed automatic transmission and introduced in 1992. They were produced through 2000 in different versions and were used in a wide range of vehicles. Since the successor model, the 6HP, could be manufactured at a significantly lower cost, most of the gearboxes were replaced shortly after its launch in 2000.

=== Planetary gearset concept ===
==== Improved fuel economy ====
The main objective in replacing the predecessor model was to improve vehicle fuel economy with extra speeds and a wider gear span to allow the engine speed level to be lowered (downspeeding), which is a decisive factor in improving energy efficiency and thus reducing fuel consumption. In addition, the lower engine speed level improves the noise-vibration-harshness comfort and the exterior noise is reduced.

==== Reduced manufacturing complexity ====
The 5HP 30 and 24 are the first transmission family with combined parallel and serial power flow to prevent these transmission from becoming larger, heavier, and more expensive. In order to avoid a further increase in manufacturing complexity while expanding the number of gear ratios, ZF switched from the conventional design method—in which the planetary gearset concept was limited to a purely serial or in-line power flow—to a more modern design method that utilizes a planetary gearset concept with combined parallel and serial power flow. This was only possible thanks to computer-aided design and has resulted in a globally patented gearset concept. The resulting progress is reflected in a better ratio of the number of gears to the number of components used compared to existing layouts. The 8HP has become the new reference standard (benchmark) for automatic transmissions.

Planetary gearset concept: manufacturing complexity (Note: Progress increases cost-effectiveness and is reflected in the ratio of forward gears to main components. It depends on the power flow: parallel: using the two degrees of freedom of planetary gearsets; to increase the number of gears; with unchanged number of components; serial: in-line combined planetary gearsets without using the two degrees of freedom; to increase the number of gears; a corresponding increase in the number of components is unavoidable)
With Assessment	Output: Gear Ratios	Innovation Elasticity (Note: Innovation elasticity classifies progress and market position: Automobile manufacturers drive forward technical developments primarily in order to remain competitive or to achieve or defend technological leadership. This technical progress has therefore always been subject to economic constraints; Only innovations whose relative additional benefit is greater than the relative additional resource input, i.e. whose economic elasticity is greater than 1, are considered for realization; The required innovation elasticity of an automobile manufacturer depends on its expected return on investment. The basic assumption that the relative additional benefit must be at least twice as high as the relative additional resource input helps with orientation; negative, if the output increases and the input decreases, is perfect; 2 or above is good; 1 or above is acceptable (red); below this is unsatisfactory (bold)) Δ Output : Δ Input	Input: Main Components			
With Assessment	Output: Gear Ratios	Innovation Elasticity Δ Output : Δ Input	Total	Gearsets	Brakes	Clutches
5HP 30/24 Ref. Object	$n_{O1}$ $n_{O2}$	Topic	$n_I= n_G+$ $n_B+ n_C$	$n_{G1}$ $n_{G2}$	$n_{B1}$ $n_{B2}$	$n_{C1}$ $n_{C2}$
Δ Number	$n_{O1}- n_{O2}$	Topic	$n_{I1}- n_{I2}$	$n_{G1}- n_{G2}$	$n_{B1}- n_{B2}$	$n_{C1}- n_{C2}$
Relative Δ	Δ Output $\tfrac{n_{O1}- n_{O2}} {n_{O2}}$	$\tfrac{n_{O1}- n_{O2}} {n_{O2}}: \tfrac{n_{I1}- n_{I2}} {n_{I2}}$ $=\tfrac{n_{O1}- n_{O2}} {n_{O2}}$·$\tfrac{n_{I2}} {n_{I1}- n_{I2}}$	Δ Input $\tfrac{n_{I1}- n_{I2}} {n_{I2}}$	$\tfrac{n_{G1}- n_{G2}} {n_{G2}}$	$\tfrac{n_{B1}- n_{B2}} {n_{B2}}$	$\tfrac{n_{C1}- n_{C2}} {n_{C2}}$
5HP 30/24 4HP 14/16/18 (Note: Direct predecessor: To reflect the progress of the specific model change)	5 (Note: plus 1 reverse gear); 4	Progress	9; 7	3; 2 (Note: of which 2 gearsets are combined as a compound Ravigneaux gearset)	3; 2	3; 3
Δ Number	1	Progress	2	1	1	0
Relative Δ	0.250 $\tfrac{1} {4}$	0.875 $\tfrac{1} {4}: \tfrac{2} {7}= \tfrac{1} {4}$·$\tfrac{7} {2}= \tfrac{7} {8}$	0.286 $\tfrac{2} {7}$	0.500 $\tfrac{1} {2}$	0.500 $\tfrac{1} {2}$	0.000 $\tfrac{0} {3}$
5HP 30/24 4HP 20/22/24	5; 4	Progress	9; 10	3; 3	3; 4	3; 3
Δ Number	1	Progress	–1	0	–1	0
Relative Δ	0.250 $\tfrac{1} {4}$	−2.500 $\tfrac{1} {4}: \tfrac{-1} {10}= \tfrac{1} {4}$·$\tfrac{10} {-1}= \tfrac{10} {-4}$	−0.100 $\tfrac{-1} {10}$	0.000 $\tfrac{0} {3}$	−0.250 $\tfrac{-1} {4}$	0.000 $\tfrac{0} {3}$
5HP 30/24 3-Speed (Note: Reference standard (benchmark): 3-speed transmissions with torque converters have established the modern market for automatic transmissions and thus made it possible in the first place, as this design proved to be a particularly successful compromise between cost and performance; It became the archetype and dominated the world market for around 3 decades, setting the standard for automatic transmissions. It was only when fuel consumption became the focus of interest that this design reached its limits, which is why it has now completely disappeared from the market; What has remained is the orientation that it offers as a reference standard (point of reference, benchmark) for this market for determining progressiveness and thus the market position of all other, later designs; All transmission variants consist of 7 main components; Typical examples are; Turbo-Hydramatic from GM; Cruise-O-Matic from Ford; TorqueFlite from Chrysler; Detroit Gear from BorgWarner for Studebaker; BW-35 from BorgWarner and as T35 from Aisin; 3N 71 from Nissan/Jatco; 3 HP from ZF Friedrichshafen; W3A 040 and W3B 050 from Mercedes-Benz)	5; 3	Market Position	9; 7	3; 2	3; 3	3; 2
Δ Number	2	Market Position	2	1	0	1
Relative Δ	0.667 $\tfrac{2} {3}$	2.333 $\tfrac{2} {3}: \tfrac{2} {7}= \tfrac{2} {3}$·$\tfrac{7} {2}= \tfrac{7} {3}$	0.286 $\tfrac{2} {7}$	0.500 $\tfrac{1} {2}$	0.000 $\tfrac{0} {3}$	0.500 $\tfrac{1} {2}$

==== Quality ====
Planetary gearset concept: gear ratio quality (Note: Revised 14 January 2026 Nomenclature: $S_n =$ sun gear: number of teeth; $R_n =$ ring gear: number of teeth; $\color{gray}{C_n = }$ carrier or planetary gear carrier (not needed); $s_n =$ sun gear: shaft speed; $r_n =$ ring gear: shaft speed; $c_n =$ carrier or planetary gear carrier: shaft speed; With $n =$ gear is: $i_n =$ gear ratio or transmission ratio; $\omega_{1;n} = \omega_t =$ shaft speed shaft 1: input (turbine) shaft; $\omega_{2;n} =$ shaft speed shaft 2: output shaft; $T_{1;n} = T_t =$ torque shaft 1: input (turbine) shaft; $T_{2;n} =$ torque shaft 2: output shaft; $\mu_n =$ torque ratio or torque conversion ratio; $\eta_n =$ efficiency; $i_0 =$ stationary gear ratio; $\eta_0 =$ (assumed) stationary gear efficiency)
In-Depth Analysis (Note: Gear ratio (transmission ratio) $i_n$ — speed conversion —: The gear ratio $i_n$ is the ratio of; input shaft speed $\omega_{1;n}$; to output shaft speed $\omega_{2;n}$; and therefore corresponds to the reciprocal of the shaft speeds; $i_n = \frac{1} {\frac{\omega_{2;n}} {\omega_{1;n}}} = \frac{\omega_{1;n}} {\omega_{2;n}} = \frac{\omega_t} {\omega_{2;n}}$) With Assessment And Torque Ratio (Note: Torque ratio (torque conversion ratio) $\mu_n$ — torque conversion —: The torque ratio $\mu_n$ is the ratio of; output torque $T_{2;n}$; to input torque $T_{1;n}$; minus efficiency losses; and therefore corresponds (apart from the efficiency losses) to the reciprocal of the shaft speeds too; $\mu_n = i_n \eta_{n;\eta_0} = \frac{\omega_{1;n} \eta_{n;\eta_0}} {\omega_{2;n}} = \frac{T_{2;n} \eta_{n;\eta_0}} {T_{1;n}}$; whereby $\eta_{n;\eta_0}$ may vary from gear to gear according to the formulas listed in this table and $0 \le \eta_{n;\eta_0} \le 1$) And Efficiency Calculation (Note: Efficiency: The efficiency $\eta_n$ is calculated; from the torque ratio; in relation to the gear ratio (transmission ratio); $\eta_n = \frac{\mu_n} {i_n}$; Power loss for single meshing gears; is in the range of 1 % to 1.5 %; helical gear pairs, which are used to reduce noise in passenger cars, are in the upper part of the loss range; spur gear pairs, which are limited to commercial vehicles due to their poorer noise comfort, are in the lower part of the loss range; Corridor for torque ratio and efficiency: in planetary gearsets, the stationary gear ratio $i_0$ is formed via the planetary gears and thus by two meshes; for reasons of simplification, the efficiency for both meshes together is commonly specified there; the efficiencies $\eta_0$ specified here are based on assumed efficiencies for the stationary ratio $i_0$; of $\eta_0 = 0.9800$ (upper value); and $\eta_0 = 0.9700$ (lower value); for both interventions together; The corresponding efficiency; for single-meshing gear pairs is ${\eta_0}^\tfrac {1}{2}$; at $0.9800^\tfrac{1} {2} = 0.98995$ (upper value); and $0.9700^\tfrac{1} {2} = 0.98489$ (lower value))		Planetary Gearset: Teeth (Note: Layout: Input and output are on opposite sides; Planetary gearset 1 is on the input (turbine) side; Input shafts are, if actuated, S_{1}, C_{2}, S_{3}, and R_{1}; Output shaft is C_{3})			Count	Nomi- nal (Note: Total ratio span (total gear ratio/total transmission ratio) nominal: $\frac{\omega_{2;n}} {\omega_{2;1}} = \frac{\frac{\omega_{2;n}} {\omega_{2;1} \omega_{2;n}}} {\frac{\omega_{2;1}} {\omega_{2;1} \omega_{2;n}}} = \frac{\frac{1} {\omega_{2;1}}} {\frac{1} {\omega_{2;n}}} = \frac{\frac{\omega_t} {\omega_{2;1}}} {\frac{\omega_t} {\omega_{2;n}}} = \frac{i_1} {i_n}$; A wider span enables the; downspeeding when driving outside the city limits; increase the climbing ability; when driving over mountain passes or off-road; or when towing a trailer) Effec- tive (Note: Total ratio span (total gear ratio/total transmission ratio) effective: $\frac{\omega_{2;n}} {max(\omega_{2;1};|\omega_{2;R}|)} = \frac{min(i_1;|i_R|)} {i_n}$; The span is only effective to the extent that; the reverse gear ratio; matches that of 1st gear; see also Standard R:1; Digression Reverse gear: is usually longer than 1st gear; the effective span is therefore of central importance for describing the suitability of a transmission; because in these cases, the nominal spread conveys a misleading picture; which is only unproblematic for vehicles with high specific power; Market participants: Manufacturers naturally have no interest in specifying the effective span; Users have not yet formulated the practical benefits that the effective span has for them; The effective span has not yet played a role in research and teaching; Contrary to its significance: the effective span has therefore not yet been able to establish itself; either in theory; or in practice.; End of digression)	Cen- ter (Note: Ratio span's center: $(i_1 i_n)^\frac{1} {2}$; The center indicates the speed level of the transmission; Together with the final drive ratio; it gives the shaft speed level of the vehicle)
In-Depth Analysis With Assessment And Torque Ratio And Efficiency Calculation		Simpson		Simple	Count	Nomi- nal Effec- tive	Avg. (Note: Average gear step: $\left( \frac{\omega_{2;n}} {\omega_{2;1}} \right) ^\frac{1} {n-1} = \left( \frac{i_1} {i_n} \right) ^\frac{1} {n-1}$; There are $n-1$ gear steps between $n$ gears; with decreasing step width; the gears connect better to each other; shifting comfort increases)
Model Type	Version First Delivery	S_{1} (Note: Sun 1: sun gear of gearset 1) R_{1} (Note: Ring 1: ring gear of gearset 1)	S_{2} (Note: Sun 2: sun gear of gearset 2) R_{2} (Note: Ring 2: ring gear of gearset 2)	S_{3} (Note: Sun 3: sun gear of gearset 3) R_{3} (Note: Ring 3: ring gear of gearset 3)	Brakes Clutches	Ratio Span	Gear Step (Note: Standard 50:50 — 50 % is above and 50 % is below the average gear step —: With steadily decreasing gear steps (yellow highlighted line Step); and a particularly large step from 1st to 2nd gear; the lower half of the gear steps (between the small gears; rounded down, here the first 2) is always larger; and the upper half of the gear steps (between the large gears; rounded up, here the last 2) is always smaller; than the average gear step (cell highlighted yellow two rows above on the far right); lower half: smaller gear steps are a waste of possible ratios (red bold); upper half: larger gear steps are unsatisfactory (red bold))
Gear	R		1	2	3	4	5
Gear Ratio	${i_R}$		${i_1}$	${i_2}$	${i_3}$	${i_4}$	${i_5}$
Step	$-\frac{i_R} {i_1}$ (Note: Standard R:1 — reverse and 1st gear have the same ratio —: The ideal reverse gear has the same transmission ratio as 1st gear; no impairment when maneuvering; especially when towing a trailer; a torque converter can only partially compensate for this deficiency; Plus 11.11 % minus 10 % compared to 1st gear is good; Plus 25 % minus 20 % is acceptable (red); Above this is unsatisfactory (bold); see also Total ratio span (total gear ratio/total transmission ratio) effective)		$\frac{i_1} {i_1}$	$\frac{i_1} {i_2}$ (Note: Standard 1:2 — gear step 1st to 2nd gear as small as possible —: With continuously decreasing gear steps (yellow marked line Step); the largest gear step is the one from 1st to 2nd gear, which; for a good speed connection and; a smooth gear shift; must be as small as possible; A gear ratio of up to 1.6667 : 1 (5 : 3) is good; Up to 1.7500 : 1 (7 : 4) is acceptable (red); Above is unsatisfactory (bold))	$\frac{i_2} {i_3}$	$\frac{i_3} {i_4}$	$\frac{i_4} {i_5}$
Δ Step (Note: From large to small gears (from right to left)) (Note: Standard STEP — from large to small gears: steady and progressive increase in gear steps —: Gear steps should; increase: Δ Step (first green highlighted line Δ Step) is always greater than 1; As progressive as possible: Δ Step is always greater than the previous step; Not progressively increasing is acceptable (red); Not increasing is unsatisfactory (bold))				$\tfrac{i_1} {i_2} : \tfrac{i_2} {i_3}$	$\tfrac{i_2} {i_3} : \tfrac{i_3} {i_4}$	$\tfrac{i_3} {i_4} : \tfrac{i_4} {i_5}$	$\tfrac{i_4} {i_5} : \tfrac{i_5} {i_6}$
Shaft Speed	$\frac{i_1} {i_R}$		$\frac{i_1} {i_1}$	$\frac{i_1} {i_2}$	$\frac{i_1} {i_3}$	$\frac{i_1} {i_4}$	$\frac{i_1} {i_5}$
Δ Shaft Speed (Note: Standard SPEED — from small to large gears: steady increase in shaft speed difference —: Shaft speed differences should; increase: Δ Shaft Speed (second line marked in green Δ (Shaft) Speed) is always greater than the previous one; 1 difference smaller than the previous one is acceptable (red); 2 consecutive ones are a waste of possible ratios (bold))	$0 - \tfrac{i_1} {i_R}$		$\tfrac{i_1} {i_1} - 0$	$\tfrac{i_1} {i_2} - \tfrac{i_1} {i_1}$	$\tfrac{i_1} {i_3} - \tfrac{i_1} {i_2}$	$\tfrac{i_1} {i_4} - \tfrac{i_1} {i_3}$	$\tfrac{i_1} {i_5} - \tfrac{i_1} {i_4}$
Torque Ratio	$\mu_R$		$\mu_1$	$\mu_2$	$\mu_3$	$\mu_4$	$\mu_5$
Efficiency $\eta_n$	$\frac{\mu_R} {i_R}$		$\frac{\mu_1} {i_1}$	$\frac{\mu_2} {i_2}$	$\frac{\mu_3} {i_3}$	$\frac{\mu_4} {i_4}$	$\frac{\mu_5} {i_5}$
5HP 30	560 N⋅m (413 lb⋅ft); 1992	40; 100	32; 108	38; 97	3; 3	4.5169; 4.5169	1.6716
5HP 30	560 N⋅m (413 lb⋅ft); 1992	40; 100	32; 108	38; 97	3; 3	4.5169; 4.5169	1.4578
Gear	R		1	2	3	4	5
Gear Ratio	−3.6842 $-\tfrac{70}{19}$		3.5526 $\tfrac{135}{38}$	2.2436 $\tfrac{175}{78}$	1.5449 $\tfrac{275}{178}$	1.0000 $\tfrac{1}{1}$	0.7865 $\tfrac{70}{89}$
Step	1.0370		1.0000	1.5835	1.4522	1.5449	1.2714
Δ Step				1.0904	0.9400	1.2151	
Speed	–0.9643		1.0000	1.5835	2.2995	3.5526	4.5169
Δ Speed	0.9643		1.0000	0.5835	0.7161	1.2531	0.9643
Torque Ratio	–3.5078 –3.4217		3.5016; 3.4761	2.2059; 2.1870	1.5272; 1.5183	1.0000	0.7782; 0.7738
Efficiency $\eta_n$	0.9521; 0.9288		0.9856; 0.9784	0.9832; 0.9748	0.9885; 0.9827	1.0000	0.9894; 0.9839
5HP 24	440 N⋅m (325 lb⋅ft); 1996	36; 93	32; 100	35; 90	3; 3	4.4435; 4.4435	1.6943
5HP 24	440 N⋅m (325 lb⋅ft); 1996	36; 93	32; 100	35; 90	3; 3	4.4435; 4.4435	1.4519
Gear	R		1	2	3	4	5
Gear Ratio	−4.0952 $-\tfrac{86}{21}$		3.5714 $\tfrac{25}{7}$	2.2000 $\tfrac{11}{5}$	1.5047 $\tfrac{161}{107}$	1.0000 $\tfrac{1}{1}$	0.8037 $\tfrac{86}{107}$
Step	1.1467		1.0000	1.6234	1.4621	1.5047	1.2419
Δ Step				1.1103	0.9717	1.2094	
Speed	–0.8721		1.0000	1.6234	2.3736	3.5714	4.4435
Δ Speed	0.8721		1.0000	0.6234	0.7502	1.1979	0.8721
Torque Ratio	–3.8985 –3.8025		3.5200; 3.4943	2.1630; 2.1445	1.4880; 1.4795	1.0000	0.7959; 0.7918
Efficiency $\eta_n$	0.9520; 0.9285		0.9856; 0.9784	0.9832; 0.9748	0.9889; 0.9833	1.0000	0.9902; 0.9851
Actuated shift elements
Brake A (Note: Blocks S_{1})					❶		❶
Brake B (Note: Blocks C_{1})				❶			
Brake C (Note: Blocks R_{3})	❶		❶				
Clutch D (Note: Connects S_{2} and S_{3} with the input (turbine))			❶	❶	❶	❶	
Clutch E (Note: Connects R_{1} with the input (turbine))						❶	❶
Clutch F (Note: Connects C_{1} with the input (turbine))	❶						
Geometric ratios: speed conversion
Gear Ratio R & 2 Ordinary (Note: Ordinary Noted: For direct determination of the gear ratio) Elementary Noted (Note: Elementary Noted: Alternative representation for determining the transmission ratio; Contains only operands; With simple fractions of both central gears of a planetary gearset; Or with the value 1; As a basis; For reliable; And traceable; Determination of the torque conversion ratio and efficiency)	$i_R = -\frac{S_2 (S_1+ R_1)(S_3+ R_3)}{S_1 R_2 S_3}$			$i_2 = \frac{(S_2+ R_2)(S_3+ R_3)}{S_2 R_3+ S_3(S_2+ R_2)}$			
Gear Ratio R & 2 Ordinary Elementary Noted	$i_R = -\tfrac{S_2} {R_2} \left(1+ \tfrac{R_1} {S_1} \right) \left(1+ \tfrac{R_3} {S_3} \right)$			$i_2 = \tfrac{1} {\tfrac{1} {1+ \tfrac{R_3} {S_3}} + \tfrac{1} {\left(1+ \tfrac{R_2} {S_2} \right) \left(1+ \tfrac{S_3} {R_3} \right)}}$			
Gear Ratio 1 & 5 Ordinary Elementary Noted	$i_1 = \frac{S_3+ R_3}{S_3}$		$i_5 = \frac{S_2 (S_1+ R_1)(S_3+ R_3)}{S_2 (S_1+ R_1) (S_3+ R_3)+ S_1 R_2 S_3}$				
Gear Ratio 1 & 5 Ordinary Elementary Noted	$i_1 = 1+ \tfrac{R_3} {S_3}$		$i_5 = \tfrac{1} {1+ \tfrac{\tfrac{R_2} {S_2}} {\left(1+ \tfrac{R_1} {S_1} \right) \left(1+ \tfrac{R_3} {S_3} \right)}}$				
Gear Ratio 3 & 4 Ordinary Elementary Noted	$i_3 = \frac{(S_1 (S_2+ R_2)+ R_1 S_2)(S_3+ R_3)}{S_2 (S_1+ R_1) (S_3+ R_3)+ S_1 R_2 S_3}$					$i_4 = \frac{1} {1}$	
Gear Ratio 3 & 4 Ordinary Elementary Noted	$i_3 = \tfrac{1} {\tfrac{1} {\tfrac{1} {1+ \tfrac{S_1} {R_1}}+ \tfrac{1+ \tfrac{R_2} {S_2}} {1+ \tfrac{R_1} {S_1}}} + \tfrac{1} {\left(1+ \tfrac{S_2} {R_2} \left(1+ \tfrac{R_1} {S_1} \right) \right) \left(1+ \tfrac{R_3} {S_3} \right)}}$					$i_4 = \frac{1} {1}$	
Kinetic ratios: torque conversion
Torque Ratio R & 1	$\mu_R = -\tfrac{S_2} {R_2} \eta_0 \left(1+ \tfrac{R_1} {S_1} \eta_0 \right) \left(1+ \tfrac{R_3} {S_3} \eta_0 \right)$				$\mu_1 = 1+ \tfrac{R_3} {S_3} \eta_0$		
Torque Ratio 2 & 5	$\mu_2 = \tfrac{1} {\tfrac{1} {1+ \tfrac{R_3} {S_3} \eta_0} + \tfrac{1} {\left(1+ \tfrac{R_2} {S_2} \eta_0 \right) \left(1+ \tfrac{S_3} {R_3} \eta_0 \right)}}$				$\mu_5 = \tfrac{1} {1+ \tfrac{\tfrac{R_2} {S_2} \cdot \tfrac{1} {\eta_0}} {\left(1+ \tfrac{R_1} {S_1} \eta_0 \right) \left(1+ \tfrac{R_3} {S_3} \eta_0 \right)}}$		
Torque Ratio 3 & 4	$\mu_3 = \tfrac{1} {\tfrac{1} {\tfrac{1} {1+ \tfrac{S_1} {R_1} \cdot \tfrac{1} {{\eta_0}^ \tfrac{1} {3}}} + \tfrac{1+ \tfrac{R_2} {S_2} {\eta_0}^ \tfrac{1} {2}} {1+ \tfrac{R_1} {S_1} \cdot \tfrac{1} {{\eta_0}^ \tfrac{1} {3}}}} + \tfrac{1} {\left(1+ \tfrac{S_2} {R_2} {\eta_0}^ \tfrac{1} {2} \left(1+ \tfrac{R_1} {S_1} {\eta_0}^ \tfrac{1} {3} \right) \right) \left(1+ \tfrac{R_3} {S_3} \eta_0 \right)}}$						$\mu_4 = \tfrac{1} {1}$

== Applications ==
Variants and applications
Model	Car Model (Note: w/o any claim of completeness)
1990: 5HP 18 · 1997: 5HP 19 · Ravigneaux planetary gearset types
5HP 18 (Note: 5HP 18: introduced in MY 1991 on the BMW E36 320i/325i and E34 5 Series; Maximum input torque: 310 N⋅m (229 lb⋅ft); Weight: ~75 kg (165 lb); Oil capacity: ~10.5 L (11.1 US qt))	1992–1993 BMW E32 — 730i M60B30; 1992–1995 BMW E34 — 525i M50B25TÜ; 1992–1995 BMW E34 — 530i M60B30; 1992–1995 BMW E34 — 525tds M51D25; 1995–2000 BMW E38 — 725tds M51D25; 1994–1996 BMW E38 — 730I M60B30; 1993–1996 BMW E36 — M3 S50B30US; 1995–1999 BMW E36 — 328i M52B28 - BMW Part No A5S 310Z; 1996–1998 BMW E38 — 728i/iL M52B28; 1997–1999 BMW E36 — M3 3.2 S52B32; 1995–1999 BMW E39 — 523i M52B25; 1995–1999 BMW E39 — 528i M52B28; 1995–1999 BMW E39 — 525tds M51D25; 1991–1999 BMW E36 — 320i
5HP 19 (Note: 5HP 19: Introduced in 1996, it has been used in a variety of cars from Audi, BMW, Porsche, and Volkswagen Passenger Cars; longitudinal engine, rear wheel drive; Maximum input torque: 300 N⋅m (221 lb⋅ft); Weight: ~79 kg (174 lb); Oil capacity: ~9.2 L (9.7 US qt))	2001–2003 BMW E46 — 330Ci M54B30; 2001–2003 BMW E46 — 330i M54B30; 2000–2003 BMW E46 — 320i M52TUB20/ M54B22; 2000– BMW E46 — 323Ci M52TUB25; 2000– BMW E46 — 323i M52TUB25; 2000– BMW E46 — 328i M52TUB28; 2000– BMW E38 — 728i M52TUB28; 2001–2003 BMW E46 — 325Ci M54B25; 2001–2003 BMW E46 — 325i M54B25; 1998–2000 BMW E39 — 520i M52TUB20; 1998–2000 BMW E39 — 523i M52TUB25; 1998–2000 BMW E39 — 528i M52TUB28; 2000–2004 BMW E39 — 520i M54B22; 2000–2004 BMW E39 — 525i M54B25; 2000–2004 BMW E39 — 530i M54B30; 2002–2005 BMW E85 — Z4 (M54 engine)
5HP 19FL (Note: 5HP 19FL: Volkswagen Group — longitudinal engine transaxle, front-wheel drive)	1996–2001 Audi A4 (B5) 2.8 V6; 1997–2003 Audi A4 (B5) 1.8T; 1997–1999 Audi A8 (D2) 3.7 V8; 1998–2001 Audi A6 (C5) 2.8 V6; 1998–2003 Volkswagen Passat GLS 1.8T; 1998–2003 Volkswagen Passat GLS 2.8 V6; 1998–2003 Volkswagen Passat GLX 2.8 V6; 2003– Volkswagen Passat GL 1.8T; 2004–2005 Volkswagen Passat GLS 2.0 TDI [ZF 1060 030106, VW GMR], [A73 Torque Converter]
5HP 19FLA (Note: 5HP 19FLA: Volkswagen Group — longitudinal engine, transaxle permanent four-wheel drive; 1999 (DRN/EKX) transmissions used induction speed sensors and 2000+ (FAS) transmissions used Hall effect sensors. These transmissions are mechanically the same, but are not interchangeable)	1996–2001 Audi A4 (B5) 2.8 V6 quattro; 1997–2001 Audi S4 (B5) 2.7 V6 'biturbo' quattro; 1997–2005 Audi A4 (B5) and Audi A4 (B6) 1.8 T quattro; 1998–2001 Audi A6 (C5) 2.8 V6 quattro; 2000–2003 Audi A6 2.7 V6 biturbo quattro; 2000–2003 Volkswagen Passat GLS V6 4motion 2.8 V6; 2000–2003 Volkswagen Passat GLX V6 4motion 2.8 V6; 2004–2005 Volkswagen Passat GLS 4motion 1.8T; 2001–2003 Audi allroad quattro 2.7 V6 biturbo; 2002–2005 Audi A4 (B6) 3.0 V6 quattro; 2002–2003 Audi A6 (C5) 3.0 V6 quattro; 2002–2003 Volkswagen Passat 4.0 W8 4motion
5HP 19HL (Note: 5HP 19HL: Porsche — longitudinal engine rear engine transaxle)	1998–2003 Porsche 911 Carrera 996 3.4; 2002–2003 Porsche 911 Targa 996 3.6
5HP 19HLA (Note: 5HP 19HLA: Porsche — longitudinal engine rear engine transaxle)	1999–2003 Porsche 911 Carrera 996 3.6; 1999–2003 Porsche 911 Carrera 4S 996 3.6 (Note: Porsche — mid-engine design flat-six engine, 5-speed tiptronic #1060, rear-wheel drive A87.01-xxx, A87.02-xxx, A87.21-xxx, [5HP19FL Valve Body, Solenoids, and Speed Sensor. Different Wiring Harness.] [Speed Sensor/Pulser part # ZF 0501314432]); 1997-2004 Porsche Boxster 986 2.5 6-cyl; 1997-2004 Porsche Boxster 986 2.7 6-cyl; 1997-2004 Porsche Boxster 986 3.2 6-cyl; 2005–2008 Porsche Boxster 987 2.7 6-cyl; 2005–2008 Porsche Boxster S 987 3.4 6-cyl; 2005–2008 Porsche Cayman 987 2.7 6-cyl; 2005–2008 Porsche Cayman S 987 3.4 6-cyl
1992: 5HP 30 · 1996: 5HP 24 · Simpson planetary gearset types
5HP 30 (Note: 5HP 30: Introduced in 1992, it was produced through 2003, and has been used in a variety of cars from Aston Martin, Bentley, BMW, and Rolls-Royce; Maximum input torque: 560 N⋅m (413 lb⋅ft); Weight: ~109 kg (240 lb); Oil capacity: ~13.5 L (14.3 US qt))	1992–1995 BMW E34 — 540i M60/B40; 1995–1997 BMW E39 — 540i M62/B44; 1998–2001 BMW E39 — 540i M62/B44TU; 1992–1994 BMW E32 — 740i M60/B40; 1994–1995 BMW E38 — 740i M60/B40; 1996–1997 BMW E38 — 740i M62/B44; 1992–1994 BMW E32 — 740iL M60/B40; 1994–1995 BMW E38 — 740iL M60/B40; 1996–1997 BMW E38 — 740iL M62/B44; 1998-2001 BMW E38 — 740d M67/D40; 1994–2001 BMW E38 — 750iL M73/B54; 1993–1995 BMW E31 — 840i M60/B40; 1995–1996 BMW E31 — 840Ci M62/B44; 1994–1997 BMW E31 — 850Ci M73/B54; 1998–2003 Rolls-Royce Silver Seraph 5.4 V12; 1998–2000 Bentley Arnage 4.4 V8; 1999–2003 Aston Martin DB7 Vantage 6.0 V12; 1999–2003 Aston Martin DB7 Vantage Volante 6.0 V12
5HP 24 (Note: 5HP 24': Introduced in 1996, it has been used in a variety of cars from Audi, BMW, Jaguar, and Land Rover – all with a front mounted longitudinal engine; Maximum input torque: 440 N⋅m (325 lb⋅ft); Weight: ~95 kg (209 lb); Oil capacity: ~9.9 L (10.5 US qt))	1996–1997 BMW E31 — 840Ci M62/B44; 1997–2001 BMW E38 — 735i M62/B35; 1997–2001 BMW E38 — 735iL M62/B35; 1997–2001 BMW E38 — 740i M62/B44; 1997–2001 BMW E38 — 740iL M62/B44; 1998–2001 BMW E38 — 730d M57; 1997–2003 BMW E39 — 540i M62/B44; 2000–2003 BMW E39 — Alpina D10 Bi-turbo; 1997-2003 Jaguar XJ Sport 3.2 V8; 1997–2002 Jaguar XK8 V8 4.0L; 1998–2003 BMW E53 — X5 4.4i; 1998–2002 Jaguar XJ8 4.0 V8; 1998–2001 Jaguar XJ8 Vanden Plas 4.0 V8; 1998–2001 Jaguar XJ8 L 4.0 V8; 2001–2003 BMW E53 — 4.6is V8; 2002–2003 BMW Z8 — Alpina 4.8 V8; 2002–2003 Jaguar XJ Sport 4.0 V8; 2003–2005 Range Rover (L322) — With BMW M62/B44 engine
5HP 24A (Note: 5HP 24A: Four-wheel drive version used in Audi (quattro) and Volkswagen Passenger Cars (4motion) marques of the Volkswagen Group; Maximum input torque: 430 N⋅m (317 lb⋅ft); Weight: ~142 kg (313 lb); Oil capacity: ~11 L (11.6 US qt))	1997–2003 Audi A8 (D2) 4.2 V8; 2001–2002 Audi A8 (D2) 6.0 W12; 1998–2003 Audi S8 (D2) 4.2 V8; 1999–2004 Audi A6 (C5) 4.2 V8; 1999–2004 Audi S6 (C5) 4.2 V8; 2000–2003 Audi A8L (D2) 4.2 V8; 2002–2004 Audi RS6 (C5) 4.2 biturbo V8; 2002–2011 Volkswagen Phaeton (Typ 3D)

== See also ==
- List of ZF transmissions
