= ZF 4HP transmission =

4-speed automatic from 1980

4HP 22 · 4HP 24 4HP 14 · 4HP 18 4HP 16 · 4HP 20

Overview
- Manufacturer: ZF Friedrichshafen
- Production: 1980 – 2010
- Model years: 1980 – 2010

Body and chassis
- Class: 4-speed longitudinal and transverse automatic transmission

Chronology
- Predecessor: ZF 3HP transmission family
- Successor: ZF 5HP transmission family

The 4HP is a 4-speed automatic transmission family from ZF with a hydrodynamic torque converter and with a hydraulic or electronic control for passenger cars. The Simpson planetary gearset types were first introduced in 1980, the Ravigneaux planetary gearset types in 1984 and were produced through 2003 in different versions and were used in a large number of vehicles. In 1995, a Simpson planetary gearset type with a much more compact design was introduced. These transmissions were available until 2010.

== Key data ==
Gear ratios (Note: Differences in gear ratios have a measurable, direct impact on vehicle dynamics, performance, waste emissions as well as fuel mileage)
Model	First Deliv- ery	Gear					Total Span			Avg. Step	Components		Nomenclature			
Model	First Deliv- ery	R	1	2	3	4	Nomi- nal	Effec- tive	Cen- ter	Avg. Step	Total	per Gear (Note: Forward gears only)	Gears Count	Cou- pling	Gear- sets	Input Shaft Diameter
Simpson planetary gearset types with 3 planetary gearsets													4	H (Note: Hydraulic torque converter · German: Hydraulischer Wandler oder Drehmomentwandler)	P (Note: Planetary gearing · German: Planetenradsätze)	
4HP 22 Large Engines	1980	−2.086	2.479	1.479	1.000	0.728	3.406	2.865	1.344	1.505	3 Gearsets; 4 Brakes; 3 Clutches	2.500	4	H	P	22 mm
4HP 22 Small Engines	1980	−2.086	2.733	1.562	1.000	0.728	3.754	2.865	1.411	1.554	3 Gearsets; 4 Brakes; 3 Clutches	2.500	4	H	P	22 mm
Ravigneaux planetary gearset types with 2 planetary gearsets combined in 1 compound planetary gearset													4	H	P	
4HP 14	1984	−2.828	2.412	1.369	1.000	0.739	3.265	3.265	1.335	1.483	2 Gearsets; 2 Brakes; 3 Clutches	1.750	4	H	P	14 mm
4HP 18	1987	−2.882	2.579	1.407	1.000	0.742	3.474	3.474	1.384	1.514	2 Gearsets; 2 Brakes; 3 Clutches	1.750	4	H	P	18 mm
Simpson planetary gearset types with 2 planetary gearsets													4	H	P	
4HP 16	2004	−2.529	2.719	1.487	1.000	0.717	3.795	3.529	1.396	1.560	2 Gearsets; 2 Brakes; 3 Clutches	1.750	4	H	P	16 mm
4HP 20	1995	−2.568	2.718	1.481	1.000	0.720	3.776	3.568	1.399	1.557	2 Gearsets; 2 Brakes; 3 Clutches	1.750	4	H	P	20 mm

Nomenclature
Position	Value	Meaning
4HP 22FLE	4	Number of gears
4HP 22FLE	H	Hydraulic converter German: Hydraulischer Wandler
4HP 22FLE	P	Planetary gearsets German: Planetenradsätze
4HP 22FLE		Torque rating (Note: 3HP to 6HP: specified indirectly via the input shaft diameter 8HP to 9HP: specified directly)
4HP 22FLE	F H	Front-engine · German: Frontmotor; Rear-engine · German: Heckmotor
4HP 22FLE	L Q	Longitudinal engine · German: Längsmotor; Transverse engine · German: Quermotor
4HP 22FLE	E A	Electronic control · German: Elektronische Steuerung; Four-wheel drive · German: Allradantrieb

== 1980: Simpson planetary gearset types — first design with 3 planetary gearsets — ==
=== Design ===
The 1979 oil crisis, as the second one after the 1973 oil crisis, called for a swift response. In 1980 ZF came up with a four-speed version by simply adding a 3rd planetary gearset, which is placed behind the original 3HP gearsets from 1973. This makes the transmission complex and costly to manufacture, long, and bulky, so it is only suitable for longitudinal installation.

=== 4HP 22 ===
Rear-wheel drive configuration. It was produced for vehicles with rear wheel drive or 4X4 layout. Introduced in 1980, it was produced through 2003, and has been used in a variety of cars from BMW, General Motors, Jaguar, Land Rover, Maserati, Peugeot, Porsche, and Volvo.

=== 4HP 22EH ===
Four-wheel drive configuration · Electronic control

=== 4HP 22HL ===
Rear-engine design · Rear-wheel drive configuration

=== 4HP 24 ===
Rear-wheel drive configuration. It was introduced in 1987 and was used in a variety of cars from Audi, BMW, Jaguar, and Land Rover.

=== 4HP 24A ===
Four-wheel drive version

== 1984: Ravigneaux planetary gearset types — design with 2 planetary gearsets combined in 1 compound planetary gearset — ==
=== Design ===
The overdrive is provided by an additional shift element, which is integrated in the original 3HP gearsets from 1963. This keeps the design compact, so it is suitable for different transmission models either for longitudinal or transverse installation.

=== 4HP 14 ===
Front-engine design. It was introduced in 1984 and produced through 2001 for Citroën, Peugeot, and Daewoo Front-wheel drive vehicles. The electronic control makes controlled power shifts and various shift programs possible.

=== 4HP 18 ===
Designed for both longitudinal and transverse installation. It was introduced in 1987, and produced through 1998, it was used in a variety of cars from Alfa Romeo, Audi, Citroën, Dodge, Eagle, Fiat, Lancia, Porsche and Saab.

=== 4HP 18FL ===
Front-engine design · Longitudinal engine

=== 4HP 18FLA ===
Front-engine design · longitudinal engine · quattro Four-wheel drive. Audi Quattro 4x4

=== 4HP 18FLE ===
Front-engine design · Longitudinal engine · Electronic control · Audi FWD, non-quattro

=== 4HP 18Q ===
Front-engine design · Transverse engine · Front-wheel drive

=== 4HP 18QE ===
Front-engine design · Transverse engine · Front-wheel drive · Electronic control

=== 4HP 18EH ===
Front-engine design · Transverse engine · Front-wheel drive · Electronic control

== 1995: Simpson planetary gearset types — second design with 2 planetary gearsets — ==
=== Design ===
In 1995, a new design made 4-speed transmissions in a Simpson planetary gearset layout without an additional planetary gearset possible, so the overdrive is provided by an additional shift element, which is integrated in the original 3HP gearsets from 1973. This keeps the design compact, so it is suitable for different transmission models either for longitudinal or transverse installation.

All models have an electronic control.

=== 4HP 16 ===
Designed for use in vehicles with Front-wheel drive and a Transverse engine. The transmission is operated via selector lever and possibly also via switch. It has a controller slip Lock-up clutch.

=== 4HP 20 ===
Front-engine design · Transverse engine · Front-wheel drive configuration. It was introduced in 1995 and has been used in a variety of cars from Citroën, Lancia, Mercedes-Benz, Peugeot, and Renault. The maximum torque capacity is 330 N⋅m (243 lb⋅ft).

== Applications ==
Variants and applications
Model	Car Model (Note: without any claim of completeness)
1980: Simpson planetary gearset types with 3 planetary gearsets
4HP 22	1984–1988 BMW E30 316 M10/B18; 1987–1988 BMW E30 316i M10/B18; 1988–1994 BMW E30 316i M40/B16; 1984–1987 BMW E30 318i M10/B18; 1987–1994 BMW E30 318i M40/B18; 1982–1993 BMW E30 320i M20/B20; 1982–1986 BMW E30 323i M20/B23; 1985–1990 BMW E30 324d M21/D24; 1987–1990 BMW E30 324td M21/D24; 1983–1988 BMW E30 325e M20/B27: Type A; 1985–1993 BMW E30 325i M20/B25: Type A; 1986–1992 BMW E30 325ix M20/B25: Type A; 1981–1987 BMW E28 518i M10/B18: Type B; 1981–1987 BMW E28 520i M20/B20: Type B; 1986–1988 BMW E28 524d M21/D24: Type B; 1983–1987 BMW E28 524td M21/D24: Type B; 1983–1988 BMW E28 525e M20/B27: Type A; 1981–1987 BMW E28 525i M30/B25: Type A; 1981–1987 BMW E28 528e M20/B27; 1981–1987 BMW E28 528i M30/B28: Type A; 1983–1984 BMW E28 533i M30/B32; 1984–1988 BMW E28 535i M30/B34: Type A; 1983–1989 BMW E24 633CSi M30/B32; 1983–1987 BMW E24 635CSi M30/B34; 1983–1984 BMW E23 733i M30/B32; 1984–1987 BMW E23 735i M30/B34: Type A; 1984–1987 BMW E23 745i (South African version) M88/3: Type A; 1988–1992 BMW E34 520i M20/B20: Type A; 1988–1992 BMW E34 524td M21/D24: Type B; 1988–1990 BMW E34 525i M20/B25: Type A; 1988–1992 BMW E34 530i M30/B30: Type A; 1988–1993 BMW E34 535i M30/B35: Type A; 1986–1994 BMW E32 730i M30/B30: Type A; 1986–1992 BMW E32 735i M30/B35: Type A; 1986–1992 BMW E32 735iL M30/B35: Type A; 1988–1992 Chevrolet Opala 2.5 (151): Type A; 1988–1992 Chevrolet Opala 4.1 (250): Type A; 1987–1993 Jaguar XJ40 3.6; 1994–1997 Jaguar X300 3.2; 1987–1991 Jaguar XJS 3.6; 1997 Land Rover Defender 90 V8 4.0 L North America Spec; 1998 Land Rover Defender 90 V8 4.0 L Defender 50th Special Edition; 1992–1999 Land Rover Discovery (Series I) V8 3.9 L; 1999–2002 Land Rover Discovery (Series II) V8 4.0 L; 1987–2002 Range Rover (except 4.6 L); 1984–1985 Lincoln Continental 2.4 L (BMW-Steyr turbodiesel); 1986–1991 Lotus Excel SA Twin Cam 4 Cyl Lotus 2.2 L 180 bhp; 1988–1997 Maserati Biturbo 2.5 V6; 1988–1997 Maserati Biturbo 2.8 V6; 1994–1998 Maserati Quattroporte IV 2.8 V6; 1986–1997 Peugeot 505 2.0 (XN): Type A; 1986–1997 Peugeot 505 2.0 (ZEJ): Type A; 1986–1997 Peugeot 505 2.2 (N9T): Type A; 1986–1997 Peugeot 505 2.2 (ZDJ): Type A; 1986–1997 Peugeot 505 2.5 (XD3): Type A; 1986–1997 Peugeot 505 2.8 (ZN3J): Type A; 1987–1989 Peugeot 604 2.5; 1984–1985 Volvo 740 GL, GLE 2.3 (non turbo) B230F: Type B; 1986– Volvo 740 GL, GLE 2.3 (non turbo) B230F: Type A; 1984–1987 Volvo 740 2.4 L Turbo-Diesel D24T; 1986–1991 Volvo 760 2.3 L; 1985–1989 Volvo 760 2.3 Turbo B230ET; 1983–1989 Volvo 760 GLE 2.4 Turbo-Diesel D24T/D24TIC; 1990–1994 Volvo 940 2.3 (non turbo, Europe & Australia) B230FB; 1990–1998 Volvo 940 2.4 L Turbo-Diesel D24TIC
4HP 22EH	1999–2004 Land Rover Discovery (Series II) TD5 Diesel
4HP 22HL	1989–1993 Porsche 911 Carrera II 3.6; 1993–1998 Porsche 993 3.6
4HP 24	1986–1994 BMW E32 750i M70/B50; 1986–1994 BMW E32 750iL M70/B50; 1986–1994 Jaguar XJ40; 1989–1994 BMW E31 850Ci M70/B50; 1989–1994 BMW E31 850i M70/B50; 1989–1996 Jaguar XJS 4.0; 1995–1997 Jaguar XJ6 (X300) 4.0; 1994–2002 Range Rover V8 4.6 L; 1999–2002 Range Rover V8 4.0 L; 2003–2004 Land Rover Discovery V8 4.6 L
4HP 24A	1990–1991 Audi V8 3.6 V8; 1992–1994 Audi V8 4.2 V8; 1994–1996 Audi D2 A8 4.2 V8 quattro; 1995–1997 Audi S6 4.2 V8 C4 100
1984: Ravigneaux planetary gearset types with 2 planetary gearsets combined in 1 compound planetary gearset
4HP 14	1984–1993 Citroën BX 1.6; 1985–1993 Citroën BX 1.9; 1987–1993 Peugeot 205 1.6; 1987–1993 Peugeot 205 1.9; 1987–1989 Peugeot 305 1.5; 1987–1996 Peugeot 309 1.6; 1987–1996 Peugeot 309 1.9; 1987–1997 Peugeot 405 1.6; 1987–1997 Peugeot 405 1.8; 1987–1997 Peugeot 405 1.9; 1990–1996 Volvo 400 series; 1991–1998 Rover 800 (XX/R17); 1992–1993 Citroën ZX 1.6; 1992–1998 Citroën ZX 1.8; 1993–1998 Citroën Xantia 1.8; 1993–1998 Citroën Xantia 2.0; 1993–2001 Peugeot 306 1.8; 1993–2001 Peugeot 306 2.0; 1996–1997 Daewoo Nubira 1.5; 1996–1997 Daewoo Nubira 1.8; 1996–1997 Daewoo Leganza 1.8; 1996–1997 Daewoo Leganza 2.0
4HP 18FL	1988–1992 Renault 25 V6 2.8; 1988–1992 Eagle Premier/Dodge Monaco V6 3.0
4HP 18FLA (Note: Audi Quattro 4x4)	1992–1994 Audi S4 (C4) 5-cyl 2.2 Turbo; 1992–1994 Audi 100 (C4) CS 2.8 V6; 1995–1997 Audi A6 (C4) quattro 2.8 V6; 1995–1997 Audi S6 (C4) quattro 5-cyl 2.2 Turbo
4HP 18FLE (Note: Audi FWD)	1991–1994 Porsche 968 4-cyl 3.0; 1992–1993 Audi 100 2.8 V6; 1992–1994 Audi 100 CS 2.8 V6; 1992–1994 Audi 100 S 2.8 V6; 1995–1997 Audi A6 2.8 V6; 1995–1997 Audi A6 2.5 TDI (AEL) (AAT)
4HP 18Q	1987–1989 Fiat Croma 2.0; 1987–1989 Fiat Croma 2.5; 1987–1998 Saab 9000; 1989–1993 Alfa Romeo 164 V6 3.0; 1989–1998 Citroën XM 2.0; 1989–1998 Citroën XM V6 3.0; 1989–1994 Fiat Croma 2.0; 1989–1994 Lancia Thema 2.0; 1989–1992 Lancia Thema V6 3.0; 1989–1999 Peugeot 605 2.0; 1989–1999 Peugeot 605 V6 3.0
4HP 18QE	1993–1997 Alfa Romeo 164 V6 3.0; 1993–1994 Lancia Thema V6 3.0
4HP 18EH	1994–1998 Lancia Kappa V6 3.0
1995: Simpson planetary gearset types with 2 planetary gearsets
4HP 16	2004–2008 Suzuki Reno 2.0L 4L; 2004–2008 Suzuki Forenza 2.0L 4L; 2004–2006 Suzuki Verona 2.0L 4L
4HP 20	1996–2004 Peugeot 406 V6 3.0; 1996–2003 Mercedes-Benz Vito; 1996–2003 Mercedes-Benz V-Class; 1997–2001 Citroën Xantia V6 2.9; 1997–2001 Citroën XM V6 2.9; 1997–1999 Peugeot 605 V6 2.9; 1998–2002 Alfa Romeo 166 V6 2.5, V6 3.0; 1998–2005 Lancia Kappa, Phedra V6 3.0; 1998–2008 Renault Laguna 3.0; 1998–2002 Renault Espace V6 3.0; 1999–2000 Renault Safrane V6 3.0 24V; 2001–2008 Citroën C5 and Citroën C8 V6 2.9, Peugeot 807 V6 2.9 and Peugeot 607 with DW12 2.2 HDi; 2004–2010 Peugeot 407 with DW12 2.2 HDi; 2003–2006 Fiat Ducato 2.8 JTD (244 Series)

== See also ==
- List of ZF transmissions
