= List of ZF transmissions =

Motor vehicle automatic and manual transmissions

ZF Friedrichshafen AG is a German technology manufacturing company that supplies systems, in particular transmissions for all kind of passenger cars and SUVs, light commercial vehicles such as vans and light trucks, as well as all types of heavy and special vehicles like trucks and buses.

Basically there are two types of motor vehicle transmissions:

- Manual – the driver has to perform each gear change using a manually operated clutch
- Automatic – once placed in drive (or any other 'automatic' selector position), it automatically selects the gear ratio dependent on engine speed and load

Basically there are two types of engine installation:

- In the longitudinal direction, the gearbox is usually designed separately from the final drive (including the differential). The transaxle configuration combines the gearbox and final drive in one housing and is only built in individual cases
- In the transverse direction, the gearbox and final drive are very often combined in one housing due to the much more restricted space available

Every type of transmission occurs in every type of installation.

== Passenger cars and light commercial vehicles ==
=== Manual transmissions ===
==== 4-speed longitudinal ====
- S4-12 – Lotus Elite type 14 (optional), Autocars/Reliant Sabra sports
- S4-18 – Bedford Van, Opel Blitz Van, Volvo C303 (TGB11), Volvo C304 (TGB13)
- 4 DS-10 – Transaxle as fitted to the Hanomag F20-F36 and Mercedes L206/L306/L307 FWD Vans
- 4 DS-10/2 – Transaxle as fitted to the Hanomag F20-F36 and Mercedes L206/L306/L307 FWD Vans

==== 5-speed longitudinal ====
- 5 DS 25 – transaxle as fitted to the Ford GT40 MK1 and MK3, De Tomaso Mangusta, De Tomaso Pantera, Maserati Bora, Abarth SE030, Lancia 037, BMW M1, Michelotti Pura
- S5D 310Z – as fitted to the BMW E36 M3 3.0
- S5D 320Z – as fitted to the BMW E36 328i
- S5-16 - 1984-1991 BMW E30 318i, 320i
- S5-17 - Alvis TD 21, Alvis TE 21, Alvis TF 21, Maserati 3500GT (S5-17-2), Maserati Sebring I and II, Maserati Quattroporte I, Maserati Mistral
- S5-18 – Alfa Romeo Alfa 6, BMW 2002 turbo, Fiat Dino, Fiat 130, Maserati Biturbo, Maserati Quattroporte, Opel Kadett C GTE, Talbot Sunbeam Lotus, Renault Master van
- S5-20 – Maserati Mistral, Maserati Sebring, Maserati Mexico, Maserati Quattroporte I, Mercedes-Benz W112 and Mercedes-Benz W113
- S5-325 – Aston Martin DB5 DB6, Maserati Ghibli, Iso
- S5-24 – 1967–1990 Aston Martin DBS, Maserati Quattroporte III
- S5-31 – 1990–2006
- S5-39 – BMW 3 Series (E46), BMW 5 Series (E39), BMW 7 Series (E38), BMW X5 (E53)
- S5-42 – 1987–1995 (Ford F-250 and F-350 Pickups, F-Super Duty Chassis-Cab Truck)
- S5-47 – 1995–1997 (Ford F-250 and F-350 Pickups, F-Super Duty Chassis-Cab Truck)

==== 6-speed longitudinal ====
- S6-37 – 1998–2015 (BMW 3 Series (E46), 4 Series, 5 Series, 6 Series)
- S6-40 – 1989–1996 (Aston Martin Vantage V550, Lotus Carlton/Omega, Chevrolet Corvette, VN Holden Commodore SS Group A)
- S6-45 – (Jaguar F-Type V6, BMW 135i/235i/335i)
- S6-53 – 1999–Present – (Alfa Romeo Giulia Quadrifoglio, Jaguar S-Type Diesel, Land Rover Discovery 3/4, BMW 5 series E60 530d)
- S6-650 – 1999–2010 (Ford F-Series Super Duty pickup Trucks, GM 2500HD & 3500 pickup trucks)

==== 7-speed longitudinal ====
- S7-45 – 2011–Present (Porsche 911 applications)

=== Automatic transmissions ===
==== Nomenclature ====
Nomenclature
Position	Value	Meaning
4HP 22FLE	4	Number of gears (Note: Forward gears only)
4HP 22FLE	H	Hydraulic converter German: Hydraulischer Wandler
4HP 22FLE	P	Planetary gearsets German: Planetenradsätze
4HP 22FLE	2–3 digits	Torque rating (Note: Torque rating: 3HP to 6HP: specified indirectly via the input shaft diameter in mm (25.4 mm equals 1 inch); 8HP to 9HP: specified directly in decanewton metres)
4HP 22FLE	F H	Front-engine · German: Frontmotor; Rear-engine · German: Heckmotor
4HP 22FLE	L Q	Longitudinal engine · German: Längsmotor; Transverse engine · German: Quermotor
4HP 22FLE	E A	Electronic control · German: Elektronische Steuerung; Four-wheel drive · German: Allradantrieb

==== Specifications ====
3- to 9-speed longitudinal and transverse
Model Gener- ation (Note: for the applications refer to the individual pages)	Version	Pro- duction Period	Engine Orien- tation	Gear Ratios (Note: Differences in gear ratios have a measurable, direct impact on vehicle dynamics, performance, waste emissions as well as fuel mileage Nomenclature With $n =$ gear is: $i_n =$ gear ratio or transmission ratio; $\omega_{1;n} = \omega_t =$ shaft speed shaft 1: input (turbine) shaft; $\omega_{2;n} =$ shaft speed shaft 2: output shaft)			Span	Layout		Cou- pling	Control
Model Gener- ation	Version	Pro- duction Period	Engine Orien- tation	$i_1$ $i_R$	$i_n$ Avg. Step (Note: Average gear step: $\left( \frac{\omega_{2;n}} {\omega_{2;1}} \right) ^\frac{1} {n-1} = \left( \frac{i_1} {i_n} \right) ^\frac{1} {n-1}$; There are $n-1$ gear steps between $n$ gears; with decreasing step width; the gears connect better to each other; shifting comfort increases)	Count (Note: plus 1 reverse gear (unless otherwise specified)) Gear- sets (Note: Epicyclic gearing (unless otherwise specified))	Nomi- nal (Note: Total ratio span (total gear ratio/total transmission ratio) nominal: $\frac{\omega_{2;n}} {\omega_{2;1}} = \frac{\frac{\omega_{2;n}} {\omega_{2;1} \omega_{2;n}}} {\frac{\omega_{2;1}} {\omega_{2;1} \omega_{2;n}}} = \frac{\frac{1} {\omega_{2;1}}} {\frac{1} {\omega_{2;n}}} = \frac{\frac{\omega_t} {\omega_{2;1}}} {\frac{\omega_t} {\omega_{2;n}}} = \frac{i_1} {i_n}$; A wider span enables the; downspeeding when driving outside the city limits; increase the climbing ability; when driving over mountain passes or off-road; or when towing a trailer) Effec- tive (Note: Total ratio span (total gear ratio/total transmission ratio) effective: $\frac{\omega_{2;n}} {max(\omega_{2;1};|\omega_{2;R}|)} = \frac{min(i_1;|i_R|)} {i_n}$; The span is only effective to the extent that; the reverse gear ratio; matches that of 1st gear; Digression Reverse gear: is usually longer than 1st gear; the effective span is therefore of central importance for describing the suitability of a transmission; because in these cases, the nominal spread conveys a misleading picture; which is only unproblematic for vehicles with high specific power; Market participants: Manufacturers naturally have no interest in specifying the effective span; Users have not yet formulated the practical benefits that the effective span has for them; The effective span has not yet played a role in research and teaching; Contrary to its significance: the effective span has therefore not yet been able to establish itself; either in theory; or in practice.; End of digression)	Power Flow (Note: Progress increases cost-effectiveness and is reflected in the ratio of forward gears to main components. It depends on the power flow: parallel: using the two degrees of freedom of planetary gearsets; to increase the number of gears; with unchanged number of components; serial: in-line combined planetary gearsets without using the two degrees of freedom; to increase the number of gears; a corresponding increase in the number of components is unavoidable) Cost Ratio	Brakes Clutches	Cou- pling	Control
3HP 12	20 kg⋅m (196 N⋅m; 145 lb⋅ft)	1963 – 1977	Longitudinal	2.5600 −2.0000	1.0000; 1.6000	3; 2	2.5600; 2.0000	S 2.0000	2; 2	Torque converter	Hydraulic
3HP 12	TBD	1963 – 1977	Longitudinal	2.2857 −2.0000	1.0000; 1.5119	3; 2	2.2857; 2.0000	S 2.0000	2; 2	Torque converter	Hydraulic
3HP 20	TBD	1967 –	Longitudinal	TBD; TBD	1.0000; TBD	3; 2	TBD	S 2.0000	2; 2	Torque converter	Hydraulic
3HP 22	TBD	1973 – 1990	Longitudinal	2.7331 −2.0857	1.0000; 1.6532	3; 2	2.7331; 2.0857	S 2.3333	3; 2	Torque converter	Hydraulic
3HP 22	30 kg⋅m (294 N⋅m; 217 lb⋅ft)	1973 – 1990	Longitudinal	2.4795 −2.0857	1.0000; 1.5746	3; 2	2.4795; 2.0857	S 2.3333	3; 2	Torque converter	Hydraulic
4HP 22	380 N⋅m (280 lb⋅ft)	1980 – 2003	Longitudinal	2.7331 −2.0857	0.7281; 1.5541	4; 3	3.7539; 2.8647	S 2.5000	4; 3	Torque converter w/ lockup	Hydraulic
4HP 22	380 N⋅m (280 lb⋅ft)	1980 – 2003	Longitudinal	2.4795 −2.0857	0.7281; 1.5045	4; 3	3.4055; 2.8647	S 2.5000	4; 3	Torque converter w/ lockup	Hydraulic
4HP 18FL (Note: 4HP 18FL: Front-wheel drive · FL: front longitudinal (German: front längs)); 4HP 18Q (Note: 4HP 18Q: Front-wheel drive · Q: transverse (German: quer), without additional F, as transverse installation only occurs with front-wheel drive (even as part of all-wheel drive))	350 N⋅m (258 lb⋅ft)	1984 – 1998	Longitudinal; Transverse	2.5789 −2.8824	0.7424; 1.5145	4; 3	3.4737; 3.4737	S 2.0000	2; 3	Torque converter w/ lockup	Hydraulic
4HP 14	TBD	1987 – 2001	Transverse	2.4118 −2.8276	0.7387; 1.4835	4; 3	3.2647; 3.2647	S 2.0000	2; 3	Torque converter	Hydraulic
4HP 24	400 N⋅m (295 lb⋅ft)	1987 – 2004	Longitudinal	2.7331 −2.0857	0.7281; 1.5541	4; 3	3.7539; 2.8647	S 2.0000	4; 3	Torque converter w/ lockup	Hydraulic
4HP 24	400 N⋅m (295 lb⋅ft)	1987 – 2004	Longitudinal	2.4795 −2.0857	0.7281; 1.5045	4; 3	3.4055; 2.8647	S 2.5000	4; 3	Torque converter w/ lockup	Hydraulic
4HP 20	330 N⋅m (243 lb⋅ft)	1995 – 2010	Transverse	2.7177 −2.5676	0.7197; 1.5572	4; 2	3.7762; 3.5676	S 1.7500	2; 3	Torque converter w/ lockup	Electronic
4HP 16	330 N⋅m (243 lb⋅ft)	2004 – 2008	Transverse	2.7195 −2.5294	0.7167; 1.5598	4; 2	3.7946; 3.5294	S 1.7500	2; 3	Torque converter w/ lockup	Electronic
5HP 18	310 N⋅m (229 lb⋅ft)	1990 – 1997	Longitudinal	3.6648 −4.0960	0.7424; 1.4906	5; 3	4.9363; 4.9363	S 2.0000	3; 4	Torque converter w/ lockup	Electronic
5HP 19	325 N⋅m (240 lb⋅ft)	1997 – 2002	Longitudinal	3.6648 −4.0960	0.7424; 1.4906	5; 3	4.9363; 4.9363	S 2.0000	3; 4	Torque converter w/ lockup	Electronic
5HP 30	560 N⋅m (413 lb⋅ft)	1992 – 2000	Longitudinal	3.5526 −3.6842	0.7865; 1.4578	5; 3	4.5169; 4.5169	P & S 1.8000	3; 3	Torque converter w/ lockup	Electronic
5HP 24	440 N⋅m (325 lb⋅ft)	1996 – 2002	Longitudinal	3.5714 −4.0952	0.8037; 1.4519	5; 3	4.4435; 4.4435	P & S 1.8000	3; 3	Torque converter w/ lockup	Electronic
6HP 26; 1st (Note: 6HP: Lepelletier gear mechanism)	600 N⋅m (443 lb⋅ft)	2000 – 2007	Longitudinal	4.1708 −3.4025	0.6911; 1.4327	6; 3	6.0354; 4.9236	P & S 1.3333	2; 3	Torque converter w/ lockup	Electronic
6HP 19; 1st	350 N⋅m (258 lb⋅ft)	2000 – 2007	Longitudinal	4.1708 −3.4025	0.6911; 1.4327	6; 3	6.0354; 4.9236	P & S 1.3333	2; 3	Torque converter w/ lockup	Electronic
6HP 32; 1st	750 N⋅m (553 lb⋅ft)	2000 – 2007	Longitudinal	4.1708 −3.4025	0.6911; 1.4327	6; 3	6.0354; 4.9236	P & S 1.3333	2; 3	Torque converter w/ lockup	Electronic
6HP 28; 2nd	600 N⋅m (443 lb⋅ft)	2007 – 2014	Longitudinal	4.1708 −3.4025	0.6911; 1.4327	6; 3	6.0354; 4.9236	P & S 1.3333	2; 3	Torque converter w/ lockup	Electronic
6HP 21; 2nd	350 N⋅m (258 lb⋅ft)	2007 – 2014	Longitudinal	4.1708 −3.4025	0.6911; 1.4327	6; 3	6.0354; 4.9236	P & S 1.3333	2; 3	Torque converter w/ lockup	Electronic
6HP 34; 2nd (Note: 6HP 34: planned, but never went into production)	750 N⋅m (553 lb⋅ft)	2007 – 2014	Longitudinal	4.1708 −3.4025	0.6911; 1.4327	6; 3	6.0354; 4.9236	P & S 1.3333	2; 3	Torque converter w/ lockup	Electronic
CFT 23 (Note: ZF CFT 23 (https://gearboxlist.com/zf/cft23/ · Retrieved 2024-11-16))	230 N⋅m (170 lb⋅ft)	2003 – 2007	Transverse	2.42 −2.42	0.42; 1.000 (CVT)	∞ (CVT)	5.762; 5.762	S 1	— —	Torque converter w/ lockup	Electronic
CFT 30 (Note: CFT 30: Ford Motor Company: 2005 – 2007 Ford Five Hundred; 2005 – 2007 Mercury Montego; 2005 – 2007 Ford Freestyle) (Note: ZF CFT 30 (https://gearboxlist.com/zf/cft30/ · Retrieved 2024-11-16))	310 N⋅m (229 lb⋅ft)	2004 – 2007	Transverse	2.47 −2.47	0.42; 1.000 (CVT)	∞ (CVT)	5.881; 5.881	S 1	— —	Torque converter w/ lockup	Electronic
7DT-45 (Note: 7DT-45: Porsche PDK (Porsche dual-clutch gearbox · German: Porsche Doppelkupplungsgetriebe) (Note: ZF 7DT-45 (https://gearboxlist.com/zf/7dt-45/ · Retrieved 2024-11-16)): 2009 Porsche 911 Carrera; 2009 Porsche 997 Carrera and Carrera S; 2009 Porsche Cayman; 2009 Porsche Boxster; See also: https://newsroom.porsche.com/en_US/media-resources/technical-specifications.html)	500 N⋅m (369 lb⋅ft)	2009 –	Longitudinal; RR	3.91 −3.55	0.62; 1.359	7; 7	6.306; 5.726	S 7 (Note: helical gear)	— —	Dual- Clutch	Electronic
7DT-70 (Note: 7DT-70: Porsche PDK (Porsche dual-clutch gearbox · German: Porsche Doppelkupplungsgetriebe) (Note: ZF 7DT-70 (https://gearboxlist.com/zf/7dt-70/ · Retrieved 2024-11-16)): 2010 Porsche 911 Turbo)	780 N⋅m (575 lb⋅ft)	2010 –	Longitudinal; RR	3.91 −3.55	0.62; 1.359	7; 7	6.306; 5.726	S 7	— —	Dual- Clutch	Electronic
7DT-75 (Note: 7DT-75: Porsche PDK (Porsche dual-clutch gearbox · German: Porsche Doppelkupplungsgetriebe) (Note: ZF 7DT-75 (https://gearboxlist.com/zf/7dt-75/ · Retrieved 2024-11-16)): 2009 Porsche Panamera)	750 N⋅m (553 lb⋅ft)	2010 –	Longitudinal	5.97 −4.57	0.59; 1.471	7; 7	10.119; 7.746	S 7	— —	Dual- clutch	Electronic
8DT-80 (Note: 8DT-80: Porsche PDK (Porsche dual-clutch gearbox · German: Porsche Doppelkupplungsgetriebe) (Note: ZF 8DT-80 (https://gearboxlist.com/zf/8dt-80/ · Retrieved 2024-11-16)): 2016 Porsche Panamera; 2018 Bentley Continental GT; 2019 Aston Martin Valhalla V6 Hybrid Limited Edition)	1,000 N⋅m (738 lb⋅ft)	2016 –	Longitudinal	5.966 −5.220	0.534; 1.412	8; 8	11.172; 9.775	S 8	— —	Dual- Clutch	Electronic
8DT-55 (Note: 8DT-55: Porsche PDK (Porsche dual-clutch gearbox · German: Porsche Doppelkupplungsgetriebe) (Note: ZF 8DT-55 (https://gearboxlist.com/zf/8dt-55/ · Retrieved 2024-11-16)): 2020 Porsche 911 Carrera S Cabriolet (8th gear missing); 2020 Porsche 911 Carrera S)	600 N⋅m (443 lb⋅ft)	2019 –	Longitudinal; RR	4.89 −3.99	0.61; 1.346	8; 8	8.016; 6.541	S 8	— —	Dual- Clutch	Electronic
8HP 70; Pilot	700 N⋅m (516 lb⋅ft)	2008 – 2011	Longitudinal	4.6957 −3.2968	0.6667; 1.3216	8; 4	7.0435; 4.9452	P & S 1.1250	2; 3	Torque converter w/ lockup	Electronic
8HP 30; 1st	300 N⋅m (221 lb⋅ft)	2010 – 2015	Longitudinal	4.7143 −3.2952	0.6667; 1.3224	8; 4	7.0714; 4.9429	P & S 1.1250	2; 3	Torque converter w/ lockup	Electronic
8HP 45; 1st	450 N⋅m (332 lb⋅ft)	2010 – 2015	Longitudinal	4.7143 −3.2952	0.6667; 1.3224	8; 4	7.0714; 4.9429	P & S 1.1250	2; 3	Torque converter w/ lockup	Electronic
8HP 55; 1st	650 N⋅m (479 lb⋅ft)	2010 –	Longitudinal	4.7143 −3.3168	0.6667; 1.3224	8; 4	7.0714; 4.9752	P & S 1.1250	2; 3	Torque converter w/ lockup	Electronic
8HP 65; 1st	650 N⋅m (479 lb⋅ft)	2010 –	Longitudinal	4.7143 −3.3168	0.6667; 1.3224	8; 4	7.0714; 4.9752	P & S 1.1250	2; 3	Torque converter w/ lockup	Electronic
8HP 70; 1st	700 N⋅m (516 lb⋅ft)	2010 – 2015	Longitudinal	4.7143 −3.3168	0.6667; 1.3224	8; 4	7.0714; 4.9752	P & S 1.1250	2; 3	Torque converter w/ lockup	Electronic
8HP 90; 1st	900 N⋅m (664 lb⋅ft) (Note: 8HP: 900 N⋅m (664 lb⋅ft) Otto (petrol) engines · 1,000 N⋅m (738 lb⋅ft) Diesel engines)	2010 – 2015	Longitudinal	4.7143 −3.3168	0.6667; 1.3224	8; 4	7.0714; 4.9752	P & S 1.1250	2; 3	Torque converter w/ lockup	Electronic
8HP 75/I; 2nd	740 N⋅m (546 lb⋅ft)	2014 – 2018	Longitudinal	4.7143 −3.3168	0.6667; 1.3224	8; 4	7.0714; 4.9752	P & S 1.1250	2; 3	Torque converter w/ lockup	Electronic
8HP 30; 2nd	300 N⋅m (221 lb⋅ft)	2014 – 2019	Longitudinal	5.0000 −3.4560	0.6400; 1.3413	8; 4	7.8125; 5.4000	P & S 1.1250	2; 3	Torque converter w/ lockup	Electronic
8HP 50; 2nd	500 N⋅m (369 lb⋅ft)	2014 – 2019	Longitudinal	5.0000 −3.4560	0.6400; 1.3413	8; 4	7.8125; 5.4000	P & S 1.1250	2; 3	Torque converter w/ lockup	Electronic
8HP 75/II; 2nd	740 N⋅m (546 lb⋅ft)	2014 – 2019	Longitudinal	5.0000 −3.4783	0.6400; 1.3413	8; 4	7.8125; 5.4348	P & S 1.1250	2; 3	Torque converter w/ lockup	Electronic
8HP 95; 2nd	900 N⋅m (664 lb⋅ft)	2014 – Present	Longitudinal	5.0000 −3.4783	0.6400; 1.3413	8; 4	7.8125; 5.4348	P & S 1.1250	2; 3	Torque converter w/ lockup	Electronic
8P 45R (Note: 8P 45R: developed for racing cars)	450 N⋅m (332 lb⋅ft)	2016 – Present	Longitudinal	TBD; TBD	TBD; 1.2275	8; 4	TBD; 4.2000	P & S 1.1250	2; 3	integrated	Electronic
9HP 28	280 N⋅m (207 lb⋅ft)	2013 – Present	Transverse	4.7001 −3.8049	0.4792; 1.3303	9; 4	9.8085; 7.9402	P & S 1.1111	3; 3	Torque converter w/ lockup	Electronic
9HP 48	480 N⋅m (354 lb⋅ft)	2013 – Present	Transverse	4.7001 −3.8049	0.4792; 1.3303	9; 4	9.8085; 7.9402	P & S 1.1111	3; 3	Torque converter w/ lockup	Electronic
Automatic transmissions with components for hybrid drive on request
8HP 76/I; 3rd	900 N⋅m (664 lb⋅ft)	2018 – Present	Longitudinal	5.0000 −3.4783	0.6400; 1.3413	8; 4	7.8125; 5.4348	P & S 1.1250	2; 3	Torque converter w/ lockup	Electronic
8HP 30; 3rd	300 N⋅m (221 lb⋅ft)	2018 – Present	Longitudinal	5.2500 −3.7120	0.6400; 1.3507	8; 4	8.2031; 5.8000	P & S 1.1250	2; 3	Torque converter w/ lockup	Electronic
8HP 51; 3rd	500 N⋅m (369 lb⋅ft)	2018 – Present	Longitudinal	5.2500 −3.7120	0.6400; 1.3507	8; 4	8.2031; 5.8000	P & S 1.1250	2; 3	Torque converter w/ lockup	Electronic
8HP 76/II; 3rd	750 N⋅m (553 lb⋅ft)	2018 – Present	Longitudinal	5.5000 −3.9930	0.6400; 1.3597	8; 4	8.5938; 6.2391	P & S 1.1250	2; 3	Torque converter w/ lockup	Electronic
Automatic transmissions with integrated, versatile component system for hybrid drive
8HP 100; 4th (Note: 8HP 100: narrow total ratio span · preferebly for Otto (petrol) engines, sports cars, and high performance engines · The first-ever BMW XM · Market launch September 2022 The all-new BMW M5 · Market launch June 2024)	1,000 N⋅m (738 lb⋅ft)	2022 – Present	Longitudinal	5.0000 −3.9680	0.6400; 1.3413	8; 4	7.8125; 6.2000	P & S 1.1250	2; 3	Torque converter w/ lockup	Electronic
8HP 80; 4th (Note: 8HP 80: wide total ratio span · preferebly for Diesel engines, offroad cars, and low performance engines · Progress and efficiency with added variety: additional drive system variants and innovations for the new BMW 7 Series · Market launch 2022/2023 Alpina XB7 AWD · Technical Data)	800 N⋅m (590 lb⋅ft)	2022 – Present	Longitudinal	5.5000 −4.5440	0.6400; 1.3597	8; 4	8.5938; 7.1000	P & S 1.1250	2; 3	Torque converter w/ lockup	Electronic

== Heavy vehicles ==
These are for heavy motor vehicles; such as large goods vehicles (trucks), buses, motorcoaches, agricultural machinery, plant equipment (such as earth movers), or specialist military vehicles such as tanks.

=== Manual synchromesh transmissions for trucks ===
TD: Truck transmission with direct drive top gear
TO: Truck transmission with overdrive top gear

==== 5-speed & 6-speed (ZF Ecolite) ====
- ZF S5-35/2 manual transmission
- S 5–42
- ZF S635
- 6 S 700 TO
- 6 S 850 TO
- 6 S 1000 TO

==== 9-speed (ZF Ecomid) ====
- 9 S 1110 TD
- 9 S 1110 TO
- 9 S 1310 TO

==== 12-speed & 16-speed (ZF Ecosplit) ====
- 12 S 2130 TD
- 12 S 2330 TD
- 12 S 2833 TD
- 16S 221 OD
- 16 S 1620 TD
- 16 S 1630 TD
- 16S 1685 TD
- 16 S 1820 TO
- 16 S 1830 TO
- 16 S 1920 TD
- 16 S 1930 TD
- 16 S 2220 TO
- 16 S 2220 TD
- 16 S 2230 TO
- 16 S 2230 TD
- 16 S 2320 TD
- 16 S 2330 TD
- 16 S 2520 TO
- 16 S 2530 TO
- 16 S 2730 TO

=== Manual synchromesh transmissions for tanks ===
==== 6-speed ====
- SSG 76 Aphon
- SSG 77 Aphon

==== 7-speed ====
- AK 7–200

=== Automatic transmissions ===
==== 2-speed automatic transmission ====
- Busmatic – 1963–1979

==== 4- to 6-speed Ecomat series ====
- 4, 5 or 6-speed with Hydraulic Retarder and Neutral on Vehicle Stop (4/5/6 HP 500/590/600) – 1980–2002
- 4, 5 or 6-speed with Hydraulic Retarder and Neutral on Vehicle Stop (4/5/6 HP 502/592/602/C) – 1997–2007
- 5, or 6-speed with Hydraulic Retarder and Neutral on Vehicle Stop (5/6 HP 504C/594C/604C) – 2006–2016

==== 6- & 7-speed EcoLife series ====
- 1st generation 6-speed with Hydraulic Retarder (6APxx0x B/C/BS/SP series) – 2008–2019
- 2nd generation 6-speed with Hydraulic Retarder (6APxx2x B/S series) – 2019–
- Off-Road 7-speed with Hydraulic Retarder (7APxx0x and 7APxx2x (S) series)
- Off-Road 6-speed with Hydraulic Retarder and Power Take-Off (6APxx2x SK series)

==== 8-speed PowerLine series ====
PowerLine specifications
Model Gener- ation	Version	Pro- duction Period	Engine Orien- tation	Gear Ratios (Note: Differences in gear ratios have a measurable, direct impact on vehicle dynamics, performance, waste emissions as well as fuel mileage Nomenclature With $n =$ gear is: $i_n =$ gear ratio or transmission ratio; $\omega_{1;n} = \omega_t =$ shaft speed shaft 1: input (turbine) shaft; $\omega_{2;n} =$ shaft speed shaft 2: output shaft)			Span	Layout		Cou- pling	Control
Model Gener- ation	Version	Pro- duction Period	Engine Orien- tation	$i_1$ $i_R$	$i_n$ Avg. Step (Note: Average gear step: $\left( \frac{\omega_{2;n}} {\omega_{2;1}} \right) ^\frac{1} {n-1} = \left( \frac{i_1} {i_n} \right) ^\frac{1} {n-1}$; There are $n-1$ gear steps between $n$ gears; with decreasing step width; the gears connect better to each other; shifting comfort increases)	Count (Note: plus 1 reverse gear (unless otherwise specified)) Gear- sets (Note: Epicyclic gearing (unless otherwise specified))	Nomi- nal (Note: Total ratio span (total gear ratio/total transmission ratio) nominal: $\frac{\omega_{2;n}} {\omega_{2;1}} = \frac{\frac{\omega_{2;n}} {\omega_{2;1} \omega_{2;n}}} {\frac{\omega_{2;1}} {\omega_{2;1} \omega_{2;n}}} = \frac{\frac{1} {\omega_{2;1}}} {\frac{1} {\omega_{2;n}}} = \frac{\frac{\omega_t} {\omega_{2;1}}} {\frac{\omega_t} {\omega_{2;n}}} = \frac{i_1} {i_n}$; A wider span enables the; downspeeding when driving outside the city limits; increase the climbing ability; when driving over mountain passes or off-road; or when towing a trailer) Effec- tive (Note: Total ratio span (total gear ratio/total transmission ratio) effective: $\frac{\omega_{2;n}} {max(\omega_{2;1};|\omega_{2;R}|)} = \frac{min(i_1;|i_R|)} {i_n}$; The span is only effective to the extent that; the reverse gear ratio; matches that of 1st gear; Digression Reverse gear: is usually longer than 1st gear; the effective span is therefore of central importance for describing the suitability of a transmission; because in these cases, the nominal spread conveys a misleading picture; which is only unproblematic for vehicles with high specific power; Market participants: Manufacturers naturally have no interest in specifying the effective span; Users have not yet formulated the practical benefits that the effective span has for them; The effective span has not yet played a role in research and teaching; Contrary to its significance: the effective span has therefore not yet been able to establish itself; either in theory; or in practice.; End of digression)	Power Flow (Note: Progress increases cost-effectiveness and is reflected in the ratio of forward gears to main components. It depends on the power flow: parallel: using the two degrees of freedom of planetary gearsets; to increase the number of gears; with unchanged number of components; serial: in-line combined planetary gearsets without using the two degrees of freedom; to increase the number of gears; a corresponding increase in the number of components is unavoidable) Cost Ratio	Brakes Clutches	Cou- pling	Control
8AP; 600 T (Note: 8AP T: Automatic Powershift Transmission for Trucks)	600 N⋅m (443 lb⋅ft)	2017 – Present	Longitudinal	4.8889 −4.2501	0.6389; 1.3374	8; 4	7.6522; 6.6523	P & S 1.1250	2; 3	Torque converter w/ lockup	Electronic
8AP; 800 T	800 N⋅m (590 lb⋅ft)	2017 – Present	Longitudinal	4.8889 −4.2501	0.6389; 1.3374	8; 4	7.6522; 6.6523	P & S 1.1250	2; 3	Torque converter w/ lockup	Electronic
8AP; 1000 T	1,000 N⋅m (738 lb⋅ft)	2017 – Present	Longitudinal	4.8889 −4.2501	0.6389; 1.3374	8; 4	7.6522; 6.6523	P & S 1.1250	2; 3	Torque converter w/ lockup	Electronic
8AP; 1200 T	1,200 N⋅m (885 lb⋅ft) (Note: higher torque on demand)	2017 – Present	Longitudinal	4.8889 −4.2501	0.6389; 1.3374	8; 4	7.6522; 6.6523	P & S 1.1250	2; 3	Torque converter w/ lockup	Electronic
8AP; 1200 S (Note: 8AP S: Automatic Powershift Transmission for Special Vehicles)	1,200 N⋅m (885 lb⋅ft)	2017 – Present	Longitudinal	4.8889 −3.7569	0.6389; 1.3374	8; 4	7.6522; 5.8803	P & S 1.1250	2; 3	Torque converter w/ lockup	Electronic

==== 12-speed AMT ====
- AS Tronic – automated manual (AMT) with Hydraulic Retarder – 1997–

== See also ==
- List of Voith transmissions
