= ZF 3HP transmission =

3-speed automatic from 1963

3HP 12 · 3HP 22

Overview
- Manufacturer: ZF Friedrichshafen
- Production: 1963–1975 · 1973–1990
- Model years: 1963–1975 · 1973–1990

Body and chassis
- Class: 3-Speed automatic transmission for longitudinal and transverse engines

Chronology
- Successor: ZF 4HP transmission family

The 3HP is a 3-speed Automatic transmission family with a hydrodynamic Torque converter with hydraulic control for passenger cars from ZF Friedrichshafen AG. In selector level position "P", the output is locked mechanically.

== Key data ==
Gear ratios (Note: Differences in gear ratios have a measurable, direct impact on vehicle dynamics, performance, waste emissions as well as fuel mileage)
Model	Version	First Deliv- ery	Gear				Total Span			Avg. Step	Components		Nomenclature			
Model	Version	First Deliv- ery	R	1	2	3	Nomi- nal	Effec- tive	Cen- ter	Avg. Step	Total	per Gear (Note: Forward gears only)	Gears Count	Cou- pling	Gear- sets	Input Shaft Diameter
Ravigneaux types													3	H (Note: Hydraulic torque converter · German: Hydraulischer Wandler oder Drehmomentwandler)	P (Note: Planetary gearing · German: Planetenradsätze)	
3HP 12	Small Engines	1963	−2.000	2.560	1.520	1.000	2.560	2.000	1.600	1.600	2 Gearsets; 3 Brakes; 2 Clutches	2.333	3	H	P	12 mm
3HP 12	Large Engines	1963	−2.000	2.286	1.429	1.000	2.286	2.000	1.512	1.512	2 Gearsets; 3 Brakes; 2 Clutches	2.333	3	H	P	12 mm
Simpson types													3	H	P	
3HP 22	Large Engines	1973	−2.086	2.479	1.479	1.000	2.479	2.086	1.575	1.575	2 Gearsets; 3 Brakes; 2 Clutches	2.333	3	H	P	22 mm
3HP 22	Small Engines	1973	−2.086	2.733	1.562	1.000	2.733	2.086	1.653	1.653	2 Gearsets; 3 Brakes; 2 Clutches	2.333	3	H	P	22 mm
3HP 22	Porsche 944	1981	−2.429	2.714	1.500	1.000	2.714	2.429	1.648	1.648	2 Gearsets; 3 Brakes; 2 Clutches	2.333	3	H	P	22 mm

== 1963: 3HP 12 — Ravigneaux planetary gearset types — ==
=== History ===
The Ravigneaux planetary gearset types were first introduced in 1963 and produced through the mid-seventies and has been used in a wide range of cars. There are versions for longitudinal and transverse engines.

=== Planetary gearset concept ===
Planetary gearset concept: gear ratio quality (Note: Revised 14 January 2026 Nomenclature: $S_n =$ sun gear: number of teeth; $R_n =$ ring gear: number of teeth; $\color{gray}{C_n = }$ carrier or planetary gear carrier (not needed); $s_n =$ sun gear: shaft speed; $r_n =$ ring gear: shaft speed; $c_n =$ carrier or planetary gear carrier: shaft speed; With $n =$ gear is: $i_n =$ gear ratio or transmission ratio; $\omega_{1;n} = \omega_t =$ shaft speed shaft 1: input (turbine) shaft; $\omega_{2;n} =$ shaft speed shaft 2: output shaft; $T_{1;n} = T_t =$ torque shaft 1: input (turbine) shaft; $T_{2;n} =$ torque shaft 2: output shaft; $\mu_n =$ torque ratio or torque conversion ratio; $\eta_n =$ efficiency; $i_0 =$ stationary gear ratio; $\eta_0 =$ (assumed) stationary gear efficiency)
In-Depth Analysis (Note: Gear ratio (transmission ratio) $i_n$ — speed conversion —: The gear ratio $i_n$ is the ratio of; input shaft speed $\omega_{1;n}$; to output shaft speed $\omega_{2;n}$; and therefore corresponds to the reciprocal of the shaft speeds; $i_n = \frac{1} {\frac{\omega_{2;n}} {\omega_{1;n}}} = \frac{\omega_{1;n}} {\omega_{2;n}} = \frac{\omega_t} {\omega_{2;n}}$) With Assessment And Torque Ratio (Note: Torque ratio (torque conversion ratio) $\mu_n$ — Torque Conversion —: The torque ratio $\mu_n$ is the ratio of; output torque $T_{2;n}$; to input torque $T_{1;n}$; minus efficiency losses; and therefore corresponds (apart from the efficiency losses) to the reciprocal of the shaft speeds too; $\mu_n = i_n \eta_{n;\eta_0} = \frac{\omega_{1;n} \eta_{n;\eta_0}} {\omega_{2;n}} = \frac{T_{2;n} \eta_{n;\eta_0}} {T_{1;n}}$; whereby $\eta_{n;\eta_0}$ may vary from gear to gear according to the formulas listed in this table and $0 \le \eta_{n;\eta_0} \le 1$) And Efficiency Calculation (Note: Efficiency: The efficiency $\eta_n$ is calculated; from the torque ratio; in relation to the gear ratio (transmission ratio); $\eta_n = \frac{\mu_n} {i_n}$; Power loss for single meshing gears; is in the range of 1 % to 1.5 %; helical gear pairs, which are used to reduce noise in passenger cars, are in the upper part of the loss range; spur gear pairs, which are limited to commercial vehicles due to their poorer noise comfort, are in the lower part of the loss range; Corridor for torque ratio and efficiency: in planetary gearsets, the stationary gear ratio $i_0$ is formed via the planetary gears and thus by two meshes; for reasons of simplification, the efficiency for both meshes together is commonly specified there; the efficiencies $\eta_0$ specified here are based on assumed efficiencies for the stationary ratio $i_0$; of $\eta_0 = 0.9800$ (upper value); and $\eta_0 = 0.9700$ (lower value); for both interventions together; The corresponding efficiency; for single-meshing gear pairs is ${\eta_0}^\tfrac {1}{2}$; at $0.9800^\tfrac{1} {2} = 0.98995$ (upper value); and $0.9700^\tfrac{1} {2} = 0.98489$ (lower value))		Planetary Gearset: Teeth (Note: Layout: Input and output are on opposite sides; Planetary gearset 2 (the outer Ravigneaux gearset) is on the input (turbine) side; Input (turbine) shafts is, if actuated S_{1} or S_{2}; Output shaft is R_{2} (ring gear of the outer Ravigneaux gearset))		Count	Nomi- nal (Note: Total ratio span (total gear ratio/total transmission ratio) nominal: $\frac{\omega_{2;n}} {\omega_{2;1}} = \frac{\frac{\omega_{2;n}} {\omega_{2;1} \omega_{2;n}}} {\frac{\omega_{2;1}} {\omega_{2;1} \omega_{2;n}}} = \frac{\frac{1} {\omega_{2;1}}} {\frac{1} {\omega_{2;n}}} = \frac{\frac{\omega_t} {\omega_{2;1}}} {\frac{\omega_t} {\omega_{2;n}}} = \frac{i_1} {i_n}$; A wider span enables the; downspeeding when driving outside the city limits; increase the climbing ability; when driving over mountain passes or off-road; or when towing a trailer) Effec- tive (Note: Total ratio span (total gear ratio/total transmission ratio) effective: $\frac{\omega_{2;n}} {max(\omega_{2;1};|\omega_{2;R}|)} = \frac{min(i_1;|i_R|)} {i_n}$; The span is only effective to the extent that; the reverse gear ratio; matches that of 1st gear; see also Standard R:1; Digression Reverse gear: is usually longer than 1st gear; the effective span is therefore of central importance for describing the suitability of a transmission; because in these cases, the nominal spread conveys a misleading picture; which is only unproblematic for vehicles with high specific power; Market participants: Manufacturers naturally have no interest in specifying the effective span; Users have not yet formulated the practical benefits that the effective span has for them; The effective span has not yet played a role in research and teaching; Contrary to its significance: the effective span has therefore not yet been able to establish itself; either in theory; or in practice.; End of digression)	Cen- ter (Note: Ratio span's center: $(i_1 i_n)^\frac{1} {2}$; The center indicates the speed level of the transmission; Together with the final drive ratio; it gives the shaft speed level of the vehicle)
In-Depth Analysis With Assessment And Torque Ratio And Efficiency Calculation		Ravigneaux		Count	Nomi- nal Effec- tive	Avg. (Note: Average gear step: $\left( \frac{\omega_{2;n}} {\omega_{2;1}} \right) ^\frac{1} {n-1} = \left( \frac{i_1} {i_n} \right) ^\frac{1} {n-1}$; There are $n-1$ gear steps between $n$ gears; with decreasing step width; the gears connect better to each other; shifting comfort increases)
Model Type	Version First Delivery	S_{1} (Note: Sun 1: sun gear of gearset 1: inner Ravigneaux gearset) R_{1} (Note: Ring 1: ring gear of gearset 1: inner Ravigneaux gearset)	S_{2} (Note: Sun 2: sun gear of gearset 2: outer Ravigneaux gearset) R_{2} (Note: Ring 2: ring gear of gearset 2: outer Ravigneaux gearset)	Brakes Clutches	Ratio Span	Gear Step (Note: Standard 50:50 — 50 % is above and 50 % is below the average gear step —: With steadily decreasing gear steps (yellow highlighted line Step); and a particularly large step from 1st to 2nd gear; the lower half of the gear steps (between the small gears; rounded down, here the first 1) is always larger; and the upper half of the gear steps (between the large gears; rounded up, here the last 1) is always smaller; than the average gear step (cell highlighted yellow two rows above on the far right); lower half: smaller gear steps are a waste of possible ratios (red bold); upper half: larger gear steps are unsatisfactory (red bold))
Gear		R		1	2	3
Gear Ratio		${i_R}$		${i_1}$	${i_2}$	${i_3}$
Step		$-\frac{i_R} {i_1}$ (Note: Standard R:1 — reverse and 1st gear have the same ratio —: The ideal reverse gear has the same transmission ratio as 1st gear; no impairment when maneuvering; especially when towing a trailer; a torque converter can only partially compensate for this deficiency; Plus 11.11 % minus 10 % compared to 1st gear is good; Plus 25 % minus 20 % is acceptable (red); Above this is unsatisfactory (bold); see also Total ratio span (total gear ratio/total transmission ratio) effective)		$\frac{i_1} {i_1}$	$\frac{i_1} {i_2}$ (Note: Standard 1:2 — gear step 1st to 2nd gear as small as possible —: With continuously decreasing gear steps (yellow marked line Step); the largest gear step is the one from 1st to 2nd gear, which; for a good speed connection and; a smooth gear shift; must be as small as possible; A gear ratio of up to 1.6667 : 1 (5 : 3) is good; Up to 1.7500 : 1 (7 : 4) is acceptable (red); Above is unsatisfactory (bold))	$\frac{i_2} {i_3}$
Δ Step (Note: From large to small gears (from right to left)) (Note: Standard STEP — from large to small gears: steady and progressive increase in gear steps —: Gear steps should; increase: Δ Step (first green highlighted line Δ Step) is always greater than 1; As progressive as possible: Δ Step is always greater than the previous step; Not progressively increasing is acceptable (red); Not increasing is unsatisfactory (bold))					$\tfrac{i_1} {i_2} : \tfrac{i_2} {i_3}$	
Shaft Speed		$\frac{i_1} {i_R}$		$\frac{i_1} {i_1}$	$\frac{i_1} {i_2}$	$\frac{i_1} {i_3}$
Δ Shaft Speed (Note: Standard SPEED — from small to large gears: steady increase in shaft speed difference —: Shaft speed differences should; increase: Δ Shaft Speed (second line marked in green Δ (Shaft) Speed) is always greater than the previous one; 1 difference smaller than the previous one is acceptable (red); 2 consecutive ones are a waste of possible ratios (bold))		$0 - \tfrac{i_1} {i_R}$		$\tfrac{i_1} {i_1} - 0$	$\tfrac{i_1} {i_2} - \tfrac{i_1} {i_1}$	$\tfrac{i_1} {i_3} - \tfrac{i_1} {i_2}$
Torque Ratio		$\mu_R$		$\mu_1$	$\mu_2$	$\mu_3$
Efficiency $\eta_n$		$\frac{\mu_R} {i_R}$		$\frac{\mu_1} {i_1}$	$\frac{\mu_2} {i_2}$	$\frac{\mu_3} {i_3}$
3HP 12	160 N⋅m (118 lb⋅ft); Small engines 1963	25; 32	32; 64	3; 2	2.5600; 2.0000	1.6000
3HP 12	160 N⋅m (118 lb⋅ft); Small engines 1963	25; 32	32; 64	3; 2	2.5600; 2.0000	1.6000
Gear		R		1	2	3
Gear Ratio		−2.0000 $-\tfrac{2} {1}$		2.5600 $\tfrac{64}{25}$	1.5200 $\tfrac{38} {25}$	1.0000 $\tfrac{1}{1}$
Step		0.7825		1.0000	1.6842	1.5200
Δ Step					1.1080	
Speed		-1.2800		1.0000	1.6842	2.5600
Δ Speed		1.2800		1.0000	0.6842	0.8758
Torque Ratio		–1.9600 –1.9400		2.4836; 2.4457	1.4928; 1.4792	1.0000
Efficiency $\eta_n$		0.9800; 0.9700		0.9702; 0.9553	0.9821; 0.9731	1.0000
3HP 12	Large Engines; 1963	28; 32	32; 64	3; 2	2.2857; 2.0000	1.5119
3HP 12	Large Engines; 1963	28; 32	32; 64	3; 2	2.2857; 2.0000	1.5119
Gear		R		1	2	3
Gear Ratio		−2.0000 $-\tfrac{2} {1}$		2.2857 $\tfrac{16}{7}$	1.4286 $\tfrac{10} {7}$	1.0000 $\tfrac{1}{1}$
Step		0.8750		1.0000	1.6000	1.4286
Δ Step					1.1280	
Speed		-1.1429		1.0000	1.6000	2.2857
Δ Speed		1.1429		1.0000	0.6000	0.6842
Torque Ratio		–1.9600 –1.9400		2.2175; 2.1836	1.4038; 1.3914	1.0000
Efficiency $\eta_n$		0.9800; 0.9700		0.9702; 0.9553	0.9826; 0.9740	1.0000
Actuated shift elements
Brake A (Note: Blocks R_{1} (ring gear of the inner Ravigneaux gearset) and S_{2} (sun gear of the outer Ravigneaux gearset))					❶	
Brake B (Note: Supports link with freewheel · blocks R_{1} (ring gear of the inner Ravigneaux gearset) and S_{2} (sun gear of the outer Ravigneaux gearset) in one direction)					❶	
Brake C (Note: Blocks C_{1} and C_{2} (the common carrier of the compound Ravigneaux gearset))		❶		❶		
Clutch D (Note: Couples S_{1} (sun gear of the inner Ravigneaux gearset) with the input (turbine))				❶	❶	❶
Clutch E (Note: Couples S_{2} (sun gear of the outer Ravigneaux gearset) with the input (turbine))		❶				❶
Geometric ratios: speed conversion
Gear Ratio Ordinary (Note: Ordinary noted: For direct determination of the ratio) Elementary Noted (Note: Elementary noted: Alternative representation for determining the transmission ratio; Contains only operands; With simple fractions of both central gears of a planetary gearset; Or with the value 1; As a basis; For reliable; And traceable; Determination of specific torque and efficiency)	$i_R = -\frac{R_2} {S_2}$	$i_1 = \frac{R_2} {S_1}$		$i_2 = \frac{R_2 (S_1+ R_1)} {S_1 (S_2+ R_2)}$		$i_3 = \frac{1} {1}$
Gear Ratio Ordinary Elementary Noted	$i_R = -\tfrac{R_2} {S_2}$	$i_1 = \tfrac{R_2} {S_1}$		$i_2 = \tfrac{1+ \tfrac{S_2} {S_1}} {1+ \tfrac{S_2} {R_2}}$		$i_3 = \frac{1} {1}$
Kinetic ratios: torque conversion
Torque Ratio	$\mu_R = -\tfrac{R_2} {S_2} \eta_0$	$\mu_1 = \tfrac{R_2} {S_1} {\eta_0}^ \tfrac{3} {2}$		$\mu_2 = \tfrac{1+ \tfrac{S_2} {S_1} \eta_0} {1+ \tfrac{S_2} {R_2} \cdot \tfrac{1} {\eta_0}}$		$\mu_3 = \tfrac{1} {1}$

== 1973: 3HP 22 — Simpson planetary gearset types — ==
=== History ===
The all new Simpson planetary gearset was introduced in 1973 and was produced through 1990 and has been used in a wide range of cars from Alfa Romeo, BMW, Citroën, Peugeot, and Fiat. There are versions for longitudinal and transverse engines.

=== Specifications ===
Specifications
Weight	45 kg (99 lb) with converter
Control	mechanical · hydraulic

=== Planetary gearset concept ===
Planetary gearset concept: gear ratio quality (Note: Revised 14 January 2026 Nomenclature: $S_n =$ sun gear: number of teeth; $R_n =$ ring gear: number of teeth; $\color{gray}{C_n = }$ carrier or planetary gear carrier (not needed); $s_n =$ sun gear: shaft speed; $r_n =$ ring gear: shaft speed; $c_n =$ carrier or planetary gear carrier: shaft speed; With $n =$ gear is: $i_n =$ gear ratio or transmission ratio; $\omega_{1;n} = \omega_t =$ shaft speed shaft 1: input (turbine) shaft; $\omega_{2;n} =$ shaft speed shaft 2: output shaft; $T_{1;n} = T_t =$ torque shaft 1: input (turbine) shaft; $T_{2;n} =$ torque shaft 2: output shaft; $\mu_n =$ torque ratio or torque conversion ratio; $\eta_n =$ efficiency; $i_0 =$ stationary gear ratio; $\eta_0 =$ (assumed) stationary gear efficiency)
In-Depth Analysis (Note: Gear ratio (transmission ratio) $i_n$ — speed conversion —: The gear ratio $i_n$ is the ratio of; input shaft speed $\omega_{1;n}$; to output shaft speed $\omega_{2;n}$; and therefore corresponds to the reciprocal of the shaft speeds; $i_n = \frac{1} {\frac{\omega_{2;n}} {\omega_{1;n}}} = \frac{\omega_{1;n}} {\omega_{2;n}} = \frac{\omega_t} {\omega_{2;n}}$) With Assessment And Torque Ratio (Note: Torque ratio (torque conversion ratio) $\mu_n$ — torque conversion —: The torque ratio $\mu_n$ is the ratio of; output torque $T_{2;n}$; to input torque $T_{1;n}$; minus efficiency losses; and therefore corresponds (apart from the efficiency losses) to the reciprocal of the shaft speeds too; $\mu_n = i_n \eta_{n;\eta_0} = \frac{\omega_{1;n} \eta_{n;\eta_0}} {\omega_{2;n}} = \frac{T_{2;n} \eta_{n;\eta_0}} {T_{1;n}}$; whereby $\eta_{n;\eta_0}$ may vary from gear to gear according to the formulas listed in this table and $0 \le \eta_{n;\eta_0} \le 1$) And Efficiency Calculation (Note: Efficiency: The efficiency $\eta_n$ is calculated; from the torque ratio; in relation to the gear ratio (transmission ratio); $\eta_n = \frac{\mu_n} {i_n}$; Power loss for single meshing gears; is in the range of 1 % to 1.5 %; helical gear pairs, which are used to reduce noise in passenger cars, are in the upper part of the loss range; spur gear pairs, which are limited to commercial vehicles due to their poorer noise comfort, are in the lower part of the loss range; Corridor for torque ratio and efficiency: in planetary gearsets, the stationary gear ratio $i_0$ is formed via the planetary gears and thus by two meshes; for reasons of simplification, the efficiency for both meshes together is commonly specified there; the efficiencies $\eta_0$ specified here are based on assumed efficiencies for the stationary ratio $i_0$; of $\eta_0 = 0.9800$ (upper value); and $\eta_0 = 0.9700$ (lower value); for both interventions together; The corresponding efficiency; for single-meshing gear pairs is ${\eta_0}^\tfrac {1}{2}$; at $0.9800^\tfrac{1} {2} = 0.98995$ (upper value); and $0.9700^\tfrac{1} {2} = 0.98489$ (lower value))		Planetary Gearset: Teeth (Note: Layout: Input and output are on opposite sides; Planetary gearset 1 is on the input (turbine) side; Input (turbine) shaft is, if actuated, S_{1} or R_{2}; Output shaft is R_{1})		Count	Nomi- nal (Note: Total ratio span (total gear ratio/total transmission ratio) nominal: $\frac{\omega_{2;n}} {\omega_{2;1}} = \frac{\frac{\omega_{2;n}} {\omega_{2;1} \omega_{2;n}}} {\frac{\omega_{2;1}} {\omega_{2;1} \omega_{2;n}}} = \frac{\frac{1} {\omega_{2;1}}} {\frac{1} {\omega_{2;n}}} = \frac{\frac{\omega_t} {\omega_{2;1}}} {\frac{\omega_t} {\omega_{2;n}}} = \frac{i_1} {i_n}$; A wider span enables the; downspeeding when driving outside the city limits; increase the climbing ability; when driving over mountain passes or off-road; or when towing a trailer) Effec- tive (Note: Total ratio span (total gear ratio/total transmission ratio) effective: $\frac{\omega_{2;n}} {max(\omega_{2;1};|\omega_{2;R}|)} = \frac{min(i_1;|i_R|)} {i_n}$; The span is only effective to the extent that; the reverse gear ratio; matches that of 1st gear; see also Standard R:1; Digression Reverse gear: is usually longer than 1st gear; the effective span is therefore of central importance for describing the suitability of a transmission; because in these cases, the nominal spread conveys a misleading picture; which is only unproblematic for vehicles with high specific power; Market participants: Manufacturers naturally have no interest in specifying the effective span; Users have not yet formulated the practical benefits that the effective span has for them; The effective span has not yet played a role in research and teaching; Contrary to its significance: the effective span has therefore not yet been able to establish itself; either in theory; or in practice.; End of digression)	Cen- ter (Note: Ratio span's center: $(i_1 i_n)^\frac{1} {2}$; The center indicates the speed level of the transmission; Together with the final drive ratio; it gives the shaft speed level of the vehicle)
In-Depth Analysis With Assessment And Torque Ratio And Efficiency Calculation		Simpson		Count	Nomi- nal Effec- tive	Avg. (Note: Average gear step: $\left( \frac{\omega_{2;n}} {\omega_{2;1}} \right) ^\frac{1} {n-1} = \left( \frac{i_1} {i_n} \right) ^\frac{1} {n-1}$; There are $n-1$ gear steps between $n$ gears; with decreasing step width; the gears connect better to each other; shifting comfort increases)
Model Type	Version First Delivery	S_{1} (Note: Sun 1: sun gear of gearset 1: inner Ravigneaux gearset) R_{1} (Note: Ring 1: ring gear of gearset 1: inner Ravigneaux gearset)	S_{2} (Note: Sun 2: sun gear of gearset 2: outer Ravigneaux gearset) R_{2} (Note: Ring 2: ring gear of gearset 2: outer Ravigneaux gearset)	Brakes Clutches	Ratio Span	Gear Step (Note: Standard 50:50 — 50 % is above and 50 % is below the average gear step —: With steadily decreasing gear steps (yellow highlighted line Step); and a particularly large step from 1st to 2nd gear; the lower half of the gear steps (between the small gears; rounded down, here the first 1) is always larger; and the upper half of the gear steps (between the large gears; rounded up, here the last 1) is always smaller; than the average gear step (cell highlighted yellow two rows above on the far right); lower half: smaller gear steps are a waste of possible ratios (red bold); upper half: larger gear steps are unsatisfactory (red bold))
Gear		R		1	2	3
Gear Ratio		${i_R}$		${i_1}$	${i_2}$	${i_3}$
Step		$-\frac{i_R} {i_1}$ (Note: Standard R:1 — reverse and 1st gear have the same ratio —: The ideal reverse gear has the same transmission ratio as 1st gear; no impairment when maneuvering; especially when towing a trailer; a torque converter can only partially compensate for this deficiency; Plus 11.11 % minus 10 % compared to 1st gear is good; Plus 25 % minus 20 % is acceptable (red); Above this is unsatisfactory (bold); see also Total ratio span (total gear ratio/total transmission ratio) effective)		$\frac{i_1} {i_1}$	$\frac{i_1} {i_2}$ (Note: Standard 1:2 — gear step 1st to 2nd gear as small as possible —: With continuously decreasing gear steps (yellow marked line Step); the largest gear step is the one from 1st to 2nd gear, which; for a good speed connection and; a smooth gear shift; must be as small as possible; A gear ratio of up to 1.6667 : 1 (5 : 3) is good; Up to 1.7500 : 1 (7 : 4) is acceptable (red); Above is unsatisfactory (bold))	$\frac{i_2} {i_3}$
Δ Step (Note: From large to small gears (from right to left)) (Note: Standard STEP — from large to small gears: steady and progressive increase in gear steps —: Gear steps should; increase: Δ Step (first green highlighted line Δ Step) is always greater than 1; As progressive as possible: Δ Step is always greater than the previous step; Not progressively increasing is acceptable (red); Not increasing is unsatisfactory (bold))					$\tfrac{i_1} {i_2} : \tfrac{i_2} {i_3}$	
Shaft Speed		$\frac{i_1} {i_R}$		$\frac{i_1} {i_1}$	$\frac{i_1} {i_2}$	$\frac{i_1} {i_3}$
Δ Shaft Speed (Note: Standard SPEED — from small to large gears: steady increase in shaft speed difference —: Shaft speed differences should; increase: Δ Shaft Speed (second line marked in green Δ (Shaft) Speed) is always greater than the previous one; 1 difference smaller than the previous one is acceptable (red); 2 consecutive ones are a waste of possible ratios (bold))		$0 - \tfrac{i_1} {i_R}$		$\tfrac{i_1} {i_1} - 0$	$\tfrac{i_1} {i_2} - \tfrac{i_1} {i_1}$	$\tfrac{i_1} {i_3} - \tfrac{i_1} {i_2}$
Torque Ratio		$\mu_R$		$\mu_1$	$\mu_2$	$\mu_3$
Efficiency $\eta_n$		$\frac{\mu_R} {i_R}$		$\frac{\mu_1} {i_1}$	$\frac{\mu_2} {i_2}$	$\frac{\mu_3} {i_3}$
3HP 22	320 N⋅m (236 lb⋅ft); 1973	35; 73	35; 73	3; 2	2.4795; 2.0857	1.5746
3HP 22	320 N⋅m (236 lb⋅ft); 1973	35; 73	35; 73	3; 2	2.4795; 2.0857	1.5746
Gear		R		1	2	3
Gear Ratio		−2.0857 $-\tfrac{2} {1}$		2.4795 $\tfrac{181} {73}$	1.4795 $\tfrac{108} {73}$	1.0000 $\tfrac{1} {1}$
Step		0.8412		1.0000	1.6759	1.4795
Δ Step					1.1328	
Speed		-1.1888		1.0000	1.6759	2.4795
Δ Speed		1.1888		1.0000	0.6759	0.8035
Torque Ratio		–2.0440 –2.0231		2.4303; 2.4060	1.4699; 1.4651	1.0000
Efficiency $\eta_n$		0.9800; 0.9700		0.9802; 0.9704	0.9935; 0.9903	1.0000
3HP 22	Small Engines; 1973	35; 73	41; 73	3; 2	2.7331; 2.0857	1.6532
3HP 22	Small Engines; 1973	35; 73	41; 73	3; 2	2.7331; 2.0857	1.6532
Gear		R		1	2	3
Gear Ratio		−2.0857 $-\tfrac{73} {35}$		2.7331 $\tfrac{6,983}{2,555}$	1.5616 $\tfrac{114} {73}$	1.0000 $\tfrac{1}{1}$
Step		0.7631		1.0000	1.7501	1.5616
Δ Step					1.1207	
Speed		-1.3103		1.0000	1.7501	2.7331
Δ Speed		1.3103		1.0000	0.7501	0.9829
Torque Ratio		–2.0440 –2.0231		2.6755; 2.6470	1.5504; 1.5448	1.0000
Efficiency $\eta_n$		0.9800; 0.9700		0.9789; 0.9685	0.9928; 0.9892	1.0000
3HP 22	Porsche 944; 1981	28; 68	32; 64	3; 2	2.7143; 2.4286	1.6475
3HP 22	Porsche 944; 1981	28; 68	32; 64	3; 2	2.7143; 2.4286	1.6475
Gear		R		1	2	3
Gear Ratio		−2.4286 $-\tfrac{17} {7}$		2.7143 $\tfrac{19}{7}$	1.5000 $\tfrac{3} {2}$	1.0000 $\tfrac{1}{1}$
Step		0.8947		1.0000	1.8095	1.5000
Δ Step					1.2063	
Speed		-1.1176		1.0000	1.8095	2.7143
Δ Speed		1.1176		1.0000	0.8095	0.9048
Torque Ratio		–2.3800 –2.3557		2.6562; 2.6275	1.4900; 1.4850	1.0000
Efficiency $\eta_n$		0.9800; 0.9700		0.9786; 0.9680	0.9933; 0.9900	1.0000
Actuated shift elements
Brake A (Note: Blocks S_{1})					❶	
Brake B (Note: Supports link with freewheel · blocks S_{1} in one direction)					❶	❶
Brake C (Note: Blocks C_{1})		❶		❶		
Clutch D (Note: Couples S_{1} with the input (turbine))				❶	❶	❶
Clutch E (Note: Couples R_{2} with the input (turbine))		❶				❶
Geometric ratios: speed conversion
Gear Ratio R & 2 Ordinary (Note: Ordinary noted: For direct determination of the gear ratio) Elementary Noted (Note: Elementary noted: Alternative representation for determining the transmission ratio; Contains only operands; With simple fractions of both central gears of a planetary gearset; Or with the value 1; As a basis; For reliable; And traceable; Determination of the torque conversion ratio and efficiency)	$i_R = -\frac{R_1} {S_1}$		$i_2 = \frac{S_2+ R_2} {R_2}$			
Gear Ratio R & 2 Ordinary Elementary Noted	$i_R = -\tfrac{R_1} {S_1}$		$i_2 = 1+ \tfrac{S_2} {R_2}$			
Gear Ratio 1 & 3 Ordinary Elementary Noted	$i_1 = \frac{S_1 (S_2+ R_2)+ R_1 S_2} {S_1 R_2}$				$i_3 = \frac{1} {1}$	
Gear Ratio 1 & 3 Ordinary Elementary Noted	$i_1 = 1+ \tfrac{S_2} {R_2} \left( 1+ \tfrac{R_1} {S_1} \right)$				$i_3 = \frac{1} {1}$	
Kinetic ratios: torque conversion
Torque Ratio R & 2	$\mu_R = -\tfrac{R_1} {S_1} \eta_0$		$\mu_2 = 1+ \tfrac{S_2} {R_2} \eta_0$			
Torque Ratio 1 & 3	$\mu_1 = 1+ \tfrac{S_2} {R_2} \eta_0 \left( 1+ \tfrac{R_1} {S_1} \eta_0 \right)$				$\mu_3 = \tfrac{1} {1}$	

== See also ==
- list of ZF transmissions
