= Front-engine design =

Front-engine, rear-wheel-drive layout

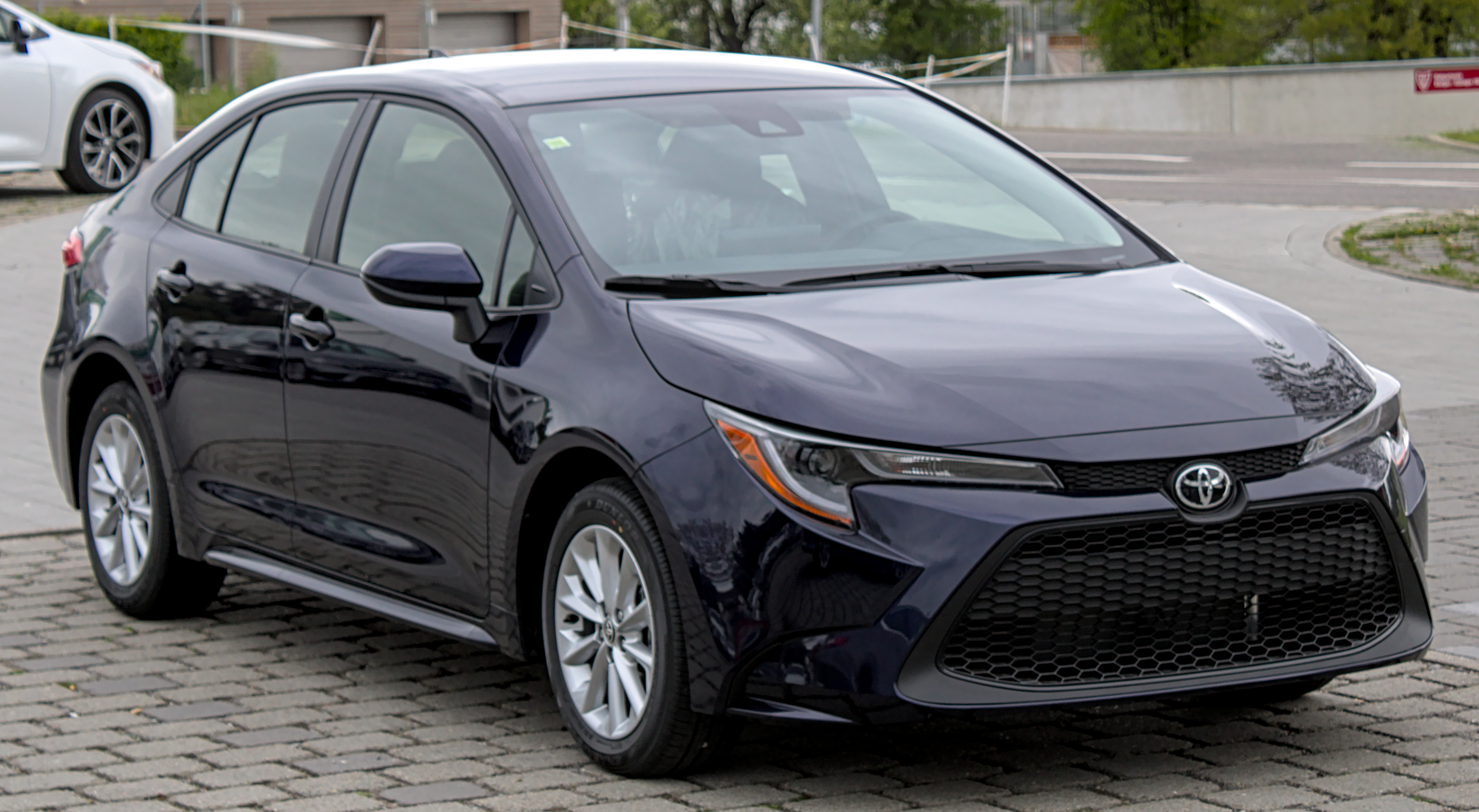
Latest Toyota Corolla uses front engine design.

Front-engine design is an automotive design where the engine is in the front side of the car, connected to the wheels via a drive shaft. The main types of Front engine design are:

- Front-engine, rear-wheel-drive layout, the traditional automotive layout for most of the 20th century.
- Front-engine, front-wheel-drive layout, which became dominant in passenger cars by the late 20th century.
- Front-engine, four-wheel-drive layout.

Advantages of front engine design include better cabin space for passengers and bigger boot space. Another advantage of putting the engine in the front is that less work is needed to reach the engine for maintenance. However, tradeoffs include the weight of the car going on the front wheels and less weight going on the rear wheels, causing understeer.

== See also ==
- Mid-engine design
- Rear-engine design
