= Simpson planetary gearset =

Type of 3- or 4-speed epicyclic gearset

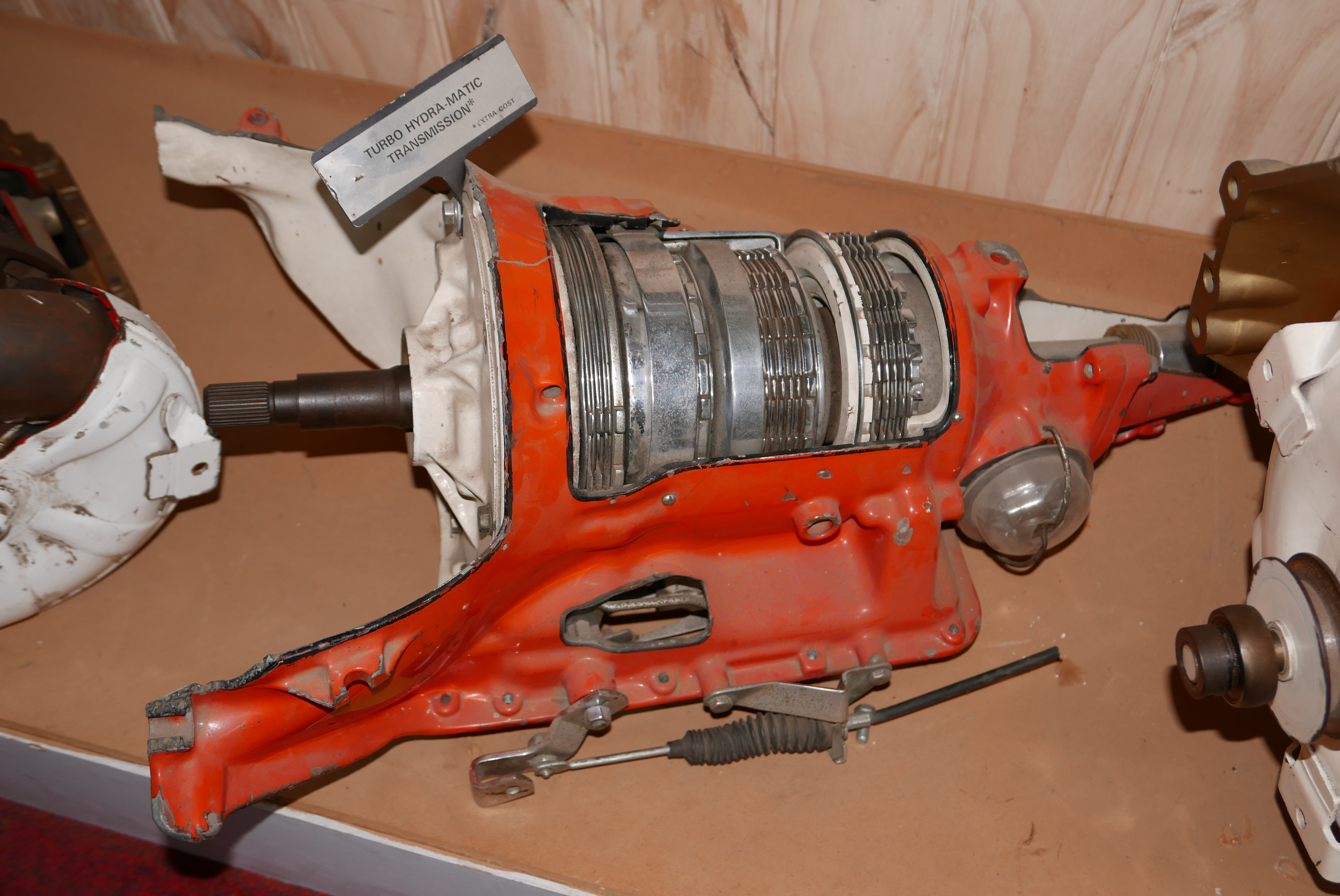
Turbo Hydra-Matic mates a torque converter to a Simpson planetary gearset

The Simpson planetary gearset is a compound gear train consisting of two planetary gearsets with a common sun gear and a coupled ring gear and carrier. A Simpson gearset delivers three or four forward gears and one reverse, plus neutral, and is commonly employed in three- and four-speed automatic transmissions. It is one of the several designs invented by American engineer Howard Simpson.

== Three-speed transmission ==
=== 1950s: three-speed design ===
Simpson Planetary Gearset Schematic Diagram

The two planetary gearsets are coupled to each other via two fixed connections, which typically—but not necessarily—use the same gearsets and gear ratios. The first connection links the sun gears together: In most cases, both gearsets share a common sun gear. The second connection links the carrier of the first gearset ("first" means closer to the input shaft) to the second gearset's ring gear. Owing to these linkages, only two brakes and two clutches are needed to command the gearsets.

Gearset Command Configurations
	First Gearset			Second Gearset		
	Sun	Carrier	Ring	Sun	Carrier	Ring
Low	-receive	output	input	-send	braked	
Reduced	braked	output	input			
Direct	input	output	input			
Reverse				input	braked	output

Beside ZF all major manufacturer obtained a license for this design too.

=== First gear ===
The first gearset actuates on the second gearset and output shaft; the second gearset reacts and makes the sun gear turn in reverse, causing the first gearset to increase the reduction ratio.

The input is coupled with the first ring gear. The first carrier is coupled with the output and second ring gear. The second carrier is braked so its ring gear motion causes the common sun to spin retrograde. The retrograde spin reduces the first carriers reaction to its ring gear motion thereby doubling the reduction of the output of the first gearset.

=== Second gear ===
The command is much simpler: the second carrier is released and the sun gear is braked. The input is coupled to the first ring gear, and the output is coupled to the first carrier.

=== Third gear ===
It is always direct drive (1:1), by coupling the input to both the first sun gear and the first ring gear, each gearset is effectively blocked and rotates as a single unit, so the input directly drives the output.

=== Reverse gear ===
The second sun gear is the input and the second carrier is braked, so the second ring gear is the output.

=== Gear changing ===
One problem of changing from first to second gear is that two shift elements must actuate in synchrony: the planet carrier of the second gearset must release at the same time as the first sun gear is braked. Sprag clutches mitigate roughness when a shift requires a combination of elements to be released or actuated.

GM's Turbo Hydra-Matic 350 and 400 transmissions utilized overrunning clutches in both the low and intermediate gears, allowing for fully progressive shifting with no "overlap". Gear changing patterns in some Simpson gearboxes, including modern four-speed units, avoid first gear as much as they can, going up to second as soon as possible, and avoiding reducing to first unless absolutely necessary (very slow speed plus floored throttle).

== Four-speed transmissions ==
=== 1960s – 1990s: first designs with 3 planetary gearsets ===
==== Overview ====
The first four-speed transmissions with Simpson gearsets need 3 planetary gearsets to get four speeds. The third planetary gearset adds an overdrive or slows down the Simpson gearset.

==== 1964: slowed down Simpson gearset ====
Mercedes-Benz slowed down the Simpson gearset and obtained a licence for a variant—featuring cross-coupled ring gears and carriers instead of coupled sun gears and only one coupled ring gear and carrier—for its 2nd automatic transmission generation with four speeds, which was launched in 1964 for the 600 and was gradually introduced with slightly different ratios in all passenger cars from 1967 onwards. The 2nd automatic transmission generation variant with three speeds (1971–1980) was not based on a Simpson gearset design, but on the Detroit Gear.

==== 1980: overdrive ====
The 1979 oil crisis, as the second one after the 1973 oil crisis, called for a swift response. In 1980 ZF came up with a four-speed version by simply adding a third planetary gearset to the 3HP from 1973, which is placed behind the original Simpson gearsets. This makes the transmission complex and costly to manufacture, long, and bulky, so it is only suitable for longitudinal installation.

Beside ZF all major manufacturer offered transmissions of this design too.

=== 1995: second design with 2 planetary gearsets ===
In 1995 ZF came up with a new design, which makes four-speed transmissions with overdrive possible in a Simpson planetary gearset layout without an additional planetary gearset: the overdrive is provided by an additional shift element, which is integrated in the original Simpson gearsets. This keeps the design cost efficient and compact, so it is suitable for different transmission models either for longitudinal or transverse installation.

Beside ZF all major manufacturer offered transmissions of this design too.

For niche applications some transmissions are kept in production because they are compact, cheap, reliable, well-known, and good enough for the target application.

== Modern transmissions ==
In the 2000s, the Simpson gearset went out of fashion and was replaced by more complex transmissions. A Ravigneaux planetary gearset was combined with a simple planetary gearset to form a Lepelletier planetary gearset, that offers six useful forward gears.

Modern eight-, nine- or ten-speed transmissions have four gearsets. In some of the gears offered by these transmissions, two of them operate according to the Simpson principle.
