= Aisin–Toyota 8-speed automatic transmission =

World's first 8-speed automatic from 2006

AA 80E/F · AE 80E/F · AL 80E/F TR-80SD · TR-81SD · TR-82SD AW F8 F35 · AW F8 F45
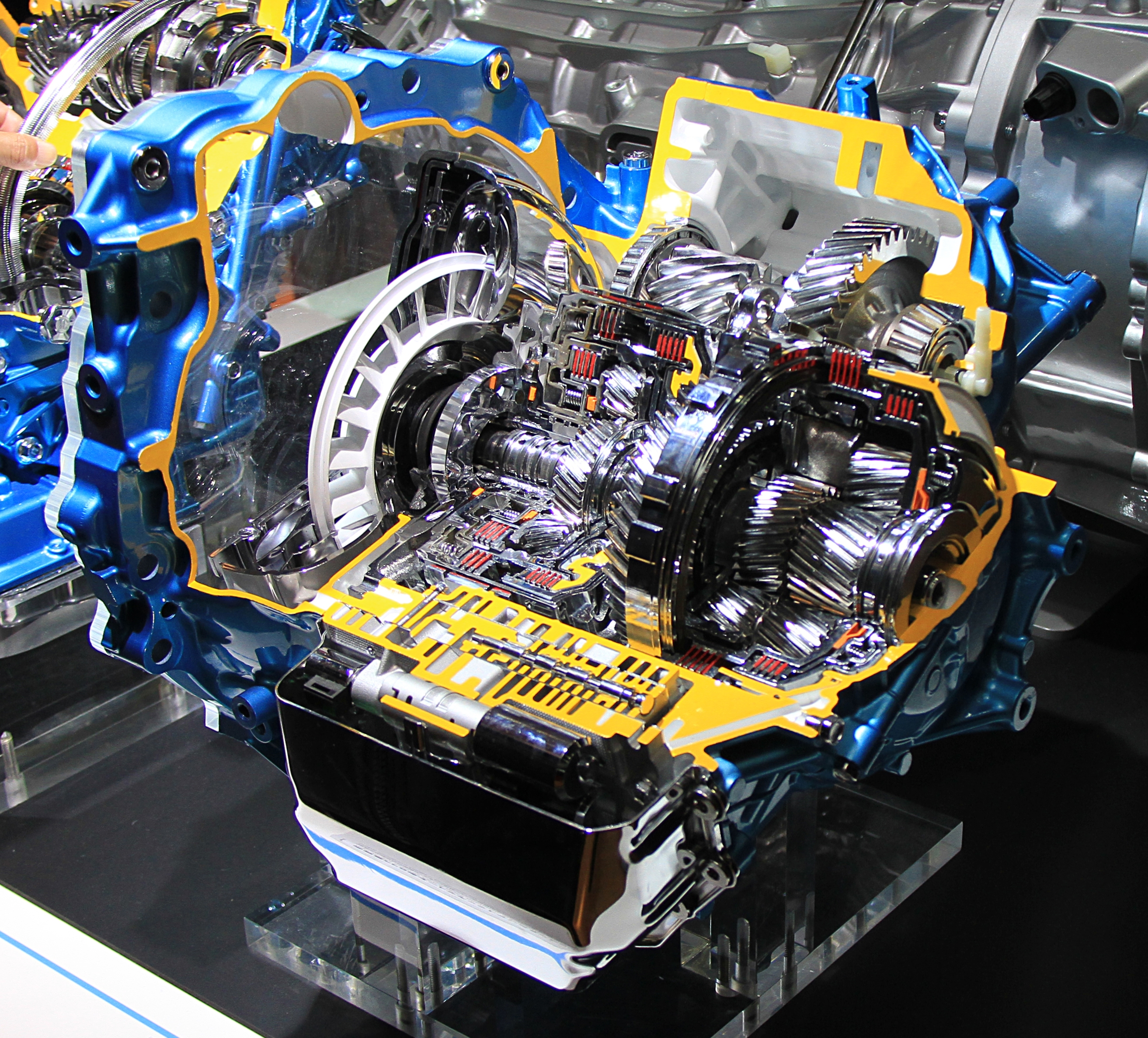
- Cutaway of an AW F8 F35

Overview
- Manufacturer: Toyota · Aisin AW
- Also called: BMW/Mini GA 8F 22AW; Volvo TG-81SC/SD; GM AW F8 F45 & AF50-8; VW AQ 450; PSA EAT8
- Production: 2006–present

Body and chassis
- Class: 8-speed automatic transmission
- Related: ZF 8HP · GM 8L · ZF 9HP

Chronology
- Predecessor: AWTF-80 SC transmission

Aisin and Toyota offer various 8-speed automatic transmissions for use with both longitudinal (Note: See also Toyota A transmission) and transverse (Note: See also Toyota U transmission) engine vehicles, based on a common, globally patented gearset concept.

== Key data ==
Gear ratios (Note: Differences in gear ratios have a measurable, direct impact on vehicle dynamics, performance, waste emissions as well as fuel mileage)
| Aisin | Toyota | First Deliv- ery | Gear | | | | | | | | | | Total Span | | | Avg. Step | Components | | Nomenclature | | | |
| Aisin | Toyota | First Deliv- ery | R2 (Note: Logically, the gearset concept (layout) provides for this 2nd reverse gear, but it will most likely not be used in the transmissions that the car manufacturers eventually bring to market. In some data sheets, the gear ratio of R2 is given, presumably a careless error) | R1 | 1 | 2 | 3 | 4 | 5 | 6 | 7 | 8 | Nomi- nal | Effec- tive | Cen- ter | Avg. Step | Total | per Gear (Note: Forward gears only) | Instal- lation | Drive | Gears Count | Maximum Input Torque |
|---|---|---|---|---|---|---|---|---|---|---|---|---|---|---|---|---|---|---|---|---|---|---|
| Longitudinal engines | | | | | | | | | | | | | | | | | 3 Gearsets; 2 Brakes; 4 Clutches | 1.125 | | | | |
| TL-80SN | AA 80E/F | 2006 | −2.176 | −4.056 | 4.597 | 2.724 | 1.864 | 1.464 | 1.231 | 1.000 | 0.824 | 0.685 | 6.709 | 5.920 | 1.775 | 1.312 | 3 Gearsets; 2 Brakes; 4 Clutches | 1.125 | A (Note: Longitudinal engine) | A (Note: Rear-wheel drive); B (Note: Four-wheel drive) | 8 | 550 N⋅m (406 lb⋅ft) |
| — | AB 80E/F | 2015 | −2.053 | −3.786 | 4.796 | 2.811 | 1.844 | 1.429 | 1.214 | 1.000 | 0.818 | 0.672 | 7.132 | 5.630 | 1.796 | 1.324 | 3 Gearsets; 2 Brakes; 4 Clutches | 1.125 | A | A B | 8 | 550 N⋅m (406 lb⋅ft) |
| TR-80SD | AE 80E/F | 2010 | −2.053 | −3.825 | 4.845 | 2.8404 | 1.864 | 1.4369 | 1.217 | 1.000 | 0.816 | 0.672 | 7.206 | 5.689 | 1.805 | 1.326 | 3 Gearsets; 2 Brakes; 4 Clutches | 1.125 | A | A B | 8 | 550 N⋅m (406 lb⋅ft) |
| TR-81SD | — | 2010 | −2.182 | −4.066 | 4.970 | 2.8398 | 1.864 | 1.4370 | 1.210 | 1.000 | 0.825 | 0.686 | 7.247 | 5.930 | 1.846 | 1.327 | 3 Gearsets; 2 Brakes; 4 Clutches | 1.125 | A | A B | 8 | 600 N⋅m (443 lb⋅ft) |
| TR-82SD | — | 2010 | −2.182 | −4.024 | 4.919 | 2.811 | 1.844 | 1.429 | 1.207 | 1.000 | 0.827 | 0.686 | 7.173 | 5.869 | 1.836 | 1.325 | 3 Gearsets; 2 Brakes; 4 Clutches | 1.125 | A | A B | 8 | 850 N⋅m (627 lb⋅ft) |
| — | AL 80E/F | 2023 | −1.870 | −3.646 | 4.413 | 2.808 | 1.950 | 1.511 | 1.274 | 1.000 | 0.793 | 0.652 | 6.774 | 5.596 | 1.696 | 1.314 | 3 Gearsets; 2 Brakes; 4 Clutches | 1.125 | A | A B | 8 | TBD |
| Transverse engines | | | | | | | | | | | | | | | | | 3 Gearsets; 2 Brakes; 4 Clutches | 1.125 | | | | |
| AW F8 F45 | UA 80E/F | 2016 | −2.059 | −4.221 | 5.519 | 3.184 | 2.050 | 1.492 | 1.235 | 1.000 | 0.801 | 0.673 | 8.200 | 6.271 | 1.927 | 1.351 | 3 Gearsets; 2 Brakes; 4 Clutches | 1.125 | U (Note: Transverse engine) | A (Note: Front-wheel drive); B | 8 | 380 N⋅m (280 lb⋅ft) |
| AW F8 F35 | UB 80E/F | 2016 | −2.059 | −4.015 | 5.250 | 3.029 | 1.950 | 1.457 | 1.221 | 1.000 | 0.809 | 0.673 | 7.800 | 5.965 | 1.880 | 1.341 | 3 Gearsets; 2 Brakes; 4 Clutches | 1.125 | U | A B | 8 | 280 N⋅m (207 lb⋅ft) |
| TG-80LS | UB 80E/F | 2017 | −2.053 | −4.003 | 5.070 | 2.972 | 1.950 | 1.4698 | 1.231 | 1.000 | 0.808 | 0.672 | 7.540 | 5.953 | 1.846 | 1.335 | 3 Gearsets; 2 Brakes; 4 Clutches | 1.125 | U | A B | 8 | 350 N⋅m (258 lb⋅ft) |
| TBD | TBD | TBD | −2.182 | −4.255 | 5.200 | 2.971 | 1.950 | 1.4700 | 1.224 | 1.000 | 0.817 | 0.686 | 7.583 | 6.205 | 1.888 | 1.336 | 3 Gearsets; 2 Brakes; 4 Clutches | 1.125 | U | A B | 8 | TBD |

== History ==
=== 2006: Aisin TL-80SN for longitudinal engines ===
The Aisin TL-80SN (Toyota AA 80E/AA 80F/AA 81E) series is the world's first 8-speed automatic transmission for passenger cars. It is designed for longitudinal engines (Note: See also Toyota A transmission) and was first used in the 2007 model year Lexus LS 460.

=== 2016: Aisin AW F8 for transverse engines ===
Beginning with the AW F8 transmission Aisin and Toyota derived a transverse engine variant (Note: See also Toyota U transmission) by adapting this globally patented gearset concept to fit into the same space as the previous generation U6xx Lepelletier planetary gearset-based 6-speed transmissions to increase the overall ratio spread, reduce gear steps, and increase the torque capacity for transverse engine vehicles as well.

The Aisin AW F8 F45 (Toyota UA 80E/UA 80F) series is the world's first 8-speed automatic transmission designed for use in transverse engine applications. It is also called EAT8 (PSA), GA 8F 22AW (BMW/Mini), TG-81SC (Volvo), AF50-8 (Opel/Vauxhall), AW F8 F45 (Cadillac), and AQ 450 (Volkswagen Group).

=== Toyota ===
Toyota’s marketing name for the transmission is "Direct Shift – 8AT 8-speed automatic transmission". In contrast to the UB 80E/F transmission, which was developed by Aisin AW for Toyota, the UA 80E/F was developed in a joint venture between Toyota and Aisin AW and rated for 380 N⋅m (280 lb⋅ft). Due to its worldwide application, development was carried out in a global manner involving R&D resources in Japan and the US. The Aisin AW F8 F35 (Toyota UB 80E/F) transmissions are used for lower torque applications, such as 4-cylinder engines, and rated for 280 N⋅m (207 lb⋅ft).

== Drivetrain ==
Drivetrain
| Model | Final Drive |
|---|---|
| AA 80E | 2.937; 2.85; 2.69 |
| AA 80F | 3.133 |
| AW F8 F35 AW F8 F45 | 4.398 |
| AW F8 F45 | 3.075; 3.200 |
| AW F8 F45 | 2.561 |

== Planetary gearset concept ==
=== Uniquely compact gearset design ===
Among all 7-, 8-, 9-, and 10-speed automatic transmissions, it is the only one that requires just three gearsets, making it so compact that it is suitable for both engine installations.

=== Improved fuel economy ===
The main objective in replacing the predecessor model was to improve vehicle fuel economy with extra speeds and a wider gear span to allow the engine speed level to be lowered (downspeeding), which is a decisive factor in improving energy efficiency and thus reducing fuel consumption. In addition, the lower engine speed level improves the noise-vibration-harshness comfort and the exterior noise is reduced. The Lexus IS F and LS 460 (with sport package) use Sport Direct Shift (SPDS) which allows for faster shift times. The torque converter can lockup from 2nd to 8th gears.

=== Reduced manufacturing complexity ===
In order to avoid a further increase in manufacturing complexity while expanding the number of gear ratios, Aisin switched from the conventional design method—in which the planetary gearset concept was limited to a purely serial or in-line power flow—to a more modern design method that utilizes a planetary gearset concept with combined parallel and serial power flow. This was only possible thanks to computer-aided design and has resulted in a globally patented gearset concept. After gaining additional gear ratios only with additional components, this time the number of components has to decrease while the number of ratios still increase. The resulting progress is reflected in a much better ratio of the number of gears to the number of components used compared to existing layouts.

Smaller parts and a hydraulic circuit with fewer components allow the transmission to maintain the same size as the previous LS 430's 6-speed transmission. The aluminum die-cast case is 10% lighter, yet 30% more rigid, even with two additional gears and a 22% greater torque capacity. The new transmission weighs 95 kg (209 lb) or 10% more than the previous unit. With new micro-laser technology gear tooth production tolerances have been reduced by 50%. Aluminum has also replaced steel on gear tooth surfaces. Shift times are as low as 0.35 seconds or 41% faster than the previous LS 430's unit.

=== Two reverse gears ===
The gearset concept offers two reverse gears. Due to the increasing electronic control of automatic transmissions and engines, a fast reverse gear (i.e. designed to reduce wheel spin) is no longer necessary for problem-free starting in icy conditions (winter mode). It is therefore unlikely that car manufacturers will make use of this special option of a dedicated winter mode with an additional reverse gear R2. For this reason, the representation of R2 in the tables is shaded gray throughout. In some data sheets, the gear ratio of R2 is given, presumably a careless error.

The direction is reversed in gearset 3, the outer one of the Ravigneaux gearset. In the fast reverse gear R2, this part of the Ravigneaux gearset is directly connected to the input (turbine) side. To reduce the shaft speed for an appropriate reverse gear R1, the input (turbine) is put through gearset 1 first. This reduction corresponds to the ratio of the 3rd gear. Therefore, the gear step between the two reverse gears reflects the ratio of the 3rd gear.

=== Quality ===
All 8-speed automatic transmissions from Aisin and Toyota for passenger cars are based on the same layout in both engines orientations. For transverse installation, the layout of the longitudinal installation was merely mirrored. Gearset 1 is not an ordinary one, but a reversed one. It consists of 2 pinions that mesh with each other. One of these pinions meshes with the sun gear, the other with the ring gear. As a results, the gearset generates different ratios and the sun gear rotates in the same direction as the ring gear when the planetary gear carrier is stationary. This made it possible to manage 8 speeds with 3 gearsets. As a result, the transmission is more compact than 8-speed transmissions from competitors. This means that an 8-speed automatic transmission was also possible for transverse engines.

== UA 80E/F failures and problems ==
The UA 80E/F family of 8-speed transmissions has had some issues which led to class action lawsuits, a Customer Support Program and numerous technical service bulletins. Starting in 2017, some Highlander and Sienna customers starting complaining of harsh or delayed shifting, delayed acceleration, hesitation, jerking, unintended acceleration, lurching and excessive revving before upshifting.

Additional issues arose when 2017 and 2018 Highlander and Sienna customers experienced whining, master warning lights/check engine lights and transmission failures. This prompted Toyota to initiate a Customer Support Program (ZJC). This program covered certain 2017 and early 2018 built Highlanders and Sienna under specific VIN parameters and transmission build dates. However, this issue has been problematic beyond the scope of the ZJC program. This is causing out of pocket costs for customers outside of the standard 6 yrs./60K mls. powertrain warranty.

More whine or grind issues have been documented in 2021 Avalon, Camry and Highlanders equipped with the UA 80E/F transmission prompting T-SB-0008-21.

In December 2024, Gears Magazine published an article which has a more in depth look at some of the UA80's shortcomings. This includes a nut which retains the races that comes loose and allows the transfer gear to move. Another common issue is fluid contamination due to clutch debris from the torque converter.

== Applications ==
Variants and applications
| Model | Car Model (Note: without any claim of completeness) |
Longitudinal engines
| AA 80E (Note: AA 80E: RWD Toyota A transmission for Toyota & Lexus) | 2007–2017 Lexus LS 460; 2008–2011 Lexus GS 460; 2008–2014 Lexus IS F; 2009–2013 Toyota Crown Majesta; 2015–present Lexus RC F (3.133 final drive); 2016–2020 Lexus GS F (2.937 final drive); 2021–present Lexus IS 500 F Sport Performance (3.133 final drive) |
| AA 80F (Note: AA 80F: AWD Toyota A transmission for Toyota & Lexus) | Lexus LS 460 |
| AA 81E (Note: AA 81E: RWD Toyota A transmission that pairs with Toyota 2GR-FSE and 2GR-FKS V6 engines) | 2014–2020 Lexus GS 350 (2.937 final drive); 2014–present Lexus IS 350 RWD (3.133 final drive); 2015–present Lexus RC 350; 2013–present Toyota Crown Athlete; 2013–2015 Lexus RX 350 F Sport; 2016–2022 Lexus RX 350 |
| AE 80F (Note: AE 80F: AWD Toyota A transmission for Toyota & Lexus) | 2015–2021 Land Cruiser 5.7 L; 2015–present Mitsubishi Pajero Sport |
| AL 80E/F (Note: AL 80E: RWD Toyota A transmission for Toyota & Lexus) (Note: AL 80F: AWD Toyota A transmission for Toyota & Lexus) | 2023–present Tacoma 2.4 L Turbo 2WD |
| TL-80SN (Note: TL-80SN: FWD Aisin transmission for other manufacturer) | 2014–2019 Cadillac CTS (with a 2.85 final drive ratio); 2010–2015 Audi Q7 1st generation (type 4L) 3.0 L TFSI · 3.6 L FSI · 4.2 L FSI; 2010–2015 Audi Q7 1st generation (type 4L) 3.0 L TDi; 2010–2015 Audi Q7 1st generation (type 4L) 4.2 L TDi; 2019–2023 Hongqi HS7 1st generationI; 2023–present Hongqi HS7 2nd generation |
| TR-80SD (Note: TR-80SD: AWD Aisin transmission for Porsche & Volkswagen) | 2010–2017 Porsche Cayenne 2nd generation (type E2 92A) 3.0 L TFSI · 3.6 L FSI · 4.2 L FSI; 2010–2018 Porsche Cayenne 2nd generation (type E2 92A) 3.0 L TDi; 2010–2017 Porsche Cayenne 2nd generation (type E2 92A) 4.2 TDi · 4.8 L Turbo; 2013–2017 Porsche Panamera 1st generation (type G1 970) facelift 3.0 L TDi; 2010–2018 Volkswagen Touareg 2nd generation (type 7P) 3.0 L TFSI · 3.6 L FSI · 4.2 L FSI; 2010–2018 Volkswagen Touareg 2nd generation (type 7P) 3.0 L TDi; 2010–2015 Volkswagen Touareg 2nd generation (type 7P) 4.2 L TDi |
Transverse engines
| UA 80E/F (Note: UA 80E: FWD Toyota U transmission for Toyota & Lexus) (Note: UA 80F: AWD Toyota U transmission for Toyota & Lexus) | 2018–present Toyota Avalon (non-hybrid engines); 2018–present Toyota Alphard/Vellfire; 2018–present Toyota Camry (non-hybrid engines); 2017–2020 Toyota Sienna; 2019–present Toyota RAV4 (non-hybrid); 2020–2022 Toyota Highlander/Grand Highlander |
| UC 80E/F (Note: UA 80E: FWD Toyota U transmission for Toyota) (Note: UA 80F: AWD Toyota U transmission for Toyota) | 2024–present Toyota GR Yaris; 2024–present Toyota GR Corolla |
| UA 80E/F | 2012–present Lexus RX (V6 AL10 F-Sport, AL20 & AL30 non Hybrids); 2018–present Lexus ES (non-hybrid engines); 2020–2023 Lexus LM (LM350); 2022–present Lexus NX (non-hybrid engines); 2024–present Lexus LBX (Morizo RR) |
| UB 80E/F (Note: UB 80E: FWD Toyota U transmission for Toyota & Lexus) (Note: UB 80F: AWD Toyota U transmission for Toyota & Lexus) | 2018–present Toyota Camry 2.5; 2019–present Toyota RAV4 2.5; 2012–2015 Lexus RX V6 F-Sport North America |
| UB 81E/F (Note: UB 81E: FWD Toyota U transmission for Lexus & other manufacturer) (Note: UB 81F: AWD Toyota U transmission for Lexus & other manufacturer) | 2016–present Lexus RX; 2015–present BMW 2 Series Active Tourer (F45) and Gran Tourer (F46) with 4-cylinder engines; 2016–present BMW X1 (F48) with 4-cylinder engines; 2016–present Mini Clubman (F54) with 4-cylinder engines; 2016–present Mini Countryman (F60) with 4-cylinder engines (and B38 with AWD); 2018–present Mini Cooper SD (F55/F56) and JCW (F56) due to torque output over 300Nm; 2018–present BMW X2 (F39) with 4-cylinder engines; 2019–present BMW 1 Series (F40) with 4-cylinder engines; 2020–present BMW 2 Series Gran Coupé with 4-cylinder engines; 2019–present Oshan COS1° GT; 2019–present Changan CS85; 2020–present Changan UNI-K; 2021–present Changan UNI-V; 2022–present Changan CS75; 2023–present Chery Tiggo 9 (AWD); 2017–present Citroën C5 Aircross; 2018–present Citroën Grand C4 SpaceTourer; 2019–present Citroën Berlingo; 2020–present Citroën C4; 2021–present Citroën C5 X; 2024–present Citroën Spacetourer EAT8; 2018–present DS 7; 2019–present DS 3; 2020–present DS 9; 2021–present DS 4; 2023–present Exeed Lanyue; 2019–present Xingyue S/ Xingyue L; 2020–present Geely Xingrui; 2016 Chevrolet Malibu; 2017 Buick LaCrosse; 2017–2019 Cadillac XT5; 2018–2020 Buick Regal TourX (I4 AWD only); 2020–present Jaguar E-Pace (1.5t 3-cylinder engines); 2020–present Discovery Sport (1.5t 3-cylinder engines); 2020–present Evoque (1.5t 3-cylinder engines); 2017–present 01; 2018–present 03; 2020–present 05; 2021–present 02; 2021–present 09; 2017–present Mitsubishi Eclipse Cross (diesel engines); 2019–present Mitsubishi Delica (diesel engines); 2017–present Opel Insignia; 2017–present Opel Grandland X; 2018–present Opel Combo; 2020–present Opel Corsa; 2020–present Opel Mokka; 2021–present Opel Astra L; 2025–present Opel Zafira Life EAT8; 2017–present Peugeot 5008; 2017–present Peugeot 308; 2019–present Peugeot 3008 1.6 EAT8 & 2.0 EAT8; 2018–present Peugeot 508 EAT8; 2019–present Peugeot Rifter EAT8; 2019–present Peugeot 208; 2019–present Peugeot 2008; 2022–present Peugeot 408; 2024–present Peugeot Traveller EAT8; 2019–present Polestar 1; 2024–present Renault Grand Koleos (4WD); 2018–present Škoda Karoq (Australian market); 2020–present Škoda Octavia (some markets); 2017–present Volkswagen Crafter and MAN TGE (transversely mounted engine only); 2018–present Volkswagen Tiguan (US version only); 2018–present Volkswagen Atlas (US version only); 2018–present Volkswagen Golf (US MK7 & MK8 in some markets); 2019–present Volkswagen Jetta (US version only); 2019–present Volkswagen Arteon (US version only); 2022–present Volkswagen Taos (FWD models) |
| TG-81SC/SD (Note: TG 81SC: FWD Aisin transmission for Volvo) (Note: TG 81SD: AWD Aisin transmission for Volvo) | 2014–2016 Volvo S80 II; 2014–2016 Volvo V70 II; 2014–2016 Volvo XC70 II; 2014–2017 Volvo XC60; 2015–2018 Volvo S60 II; 2015–2018 Volvo V60; 2014–present Volvo XC90 II; 2016–present Volvo S90 II; 2016–present Volvo V90 II; 2016–present Volvo V40; 2017–present Volvo XC60 II; 2017–present Volvo XC40; 2018–present Volvo V60 II; 2018–present Volvo S60 III |

== See also ==
- List of Aisin transmissions
- List of Toyota transmissions
- Toyota A transmission
- Toyota U transmission
