= Toyota U transmission =

Motor vehicle automatic transmissions

Toyota Motor Corporation's U family is a family of automatic front-wheel drive/rear-wheel drive/four-wheel drive transmissions found in later vehicle models.

== U1xx ==
=== U140E ===
- This is the U140E for front-wheel drive V6 models.

Applications

- 1999–2001 Lexus ES 300
- 1999–2003 Lexus RX 300 (FWD)
- 2001–2003 Toyota Highlander (V6)
- 2002–2004 Toyota Camry (V6)
- 2008–2010 Toyota Corolla Altis
- 2009–2013 Toyota Corolla

1st	2nd	3rd	4th	Reverse	Final
3.938	2.194	1.411	1.019	3.141	3.480

=== U140F ===
Applications

- 1998–2002 Toyota Caldina ST215 (AWD)
- 1999–2003 Lexus RX 300 (AWD)
- 2000–2010 Toyota Previa/Estima/Tarago (4WD)
- 2001–2003 Toyota Highlander (AWD)
- 2001–2012 Toyota RAV4 (AWD)
- 2002–2007 Toyota Caldina GT-Four
- 2009–2014 Toyota Matrix (AWD)
- 2009–2010 Pontiac Vibe (AWD)

1st	2nd	3rd	4th	Reverse	Final
3.938	2.194	1.411	1.019	3.141	3.080

=== U142E ===
- 2001–2012 Toyota RAV4 FWD

=== U150E ===
5 speed automatic transaxle

Gear ratios for this transmission

1st	2nd	3rd	4th	5th	Reverse	Final
3.938	2.194	1.411	0.973	0.703	3.141	3.478

Applications

- 2002–2003 Lexus ES 300

=== U151E ===
- This is the U151E for V6 models.

5 speed automatic transaxle

Gear ratios

1st	2nd	3rd	4th	5th	Reverse	Final
4.235	2.360	1.517	1.047	0.756	3.378	Varies

Applications

- 2002-2003 Lexus ES 300 (1MZ)
- 2003–2006 Toyota Camry (1MZ/3MZ)
- 2004–2008 Toyota Camry Solara (3MZ)
- 2004–2010 Toyota Sienna (3MZ/2GR)
- 2004–2013 Toyota Highlander (3MZ/2GR)
- 2004–2006 Lexus RX 330 (3MZ)
- 2004–2006 Lexus ES 330 (3MZ)
- 2005–2007 Toyota Avalon (2GR-FE)
- 2005–2009 Toyota Avensis (2AZ-FSE)
- 2006–2012 Toyota RAV4 (2GR-FE)

U151E Final Drive Ratios

Camry/Solara	Highlander	Sienna/RAV4
3.291	3.478	3.080

=== U151F ===
5 speed automatic transaxle (4x4)

Applications

- 2003–2008 Lexus RX300, RX330, RX350 (V6 AWD)
- 2004–2010 Toyota Sienna (V6 AWD)
- 2004–2013 Toyota Highlander (V6 AWD)
- 2006–2012 Toyota RAV4 (V6 AWD)
- 2006–2010 Toyota Harrier (2GR-FE)

== U2xx ==
=== U240E ===
4 speed automatic transaxle

Gear ratios for this transmission.

1st	2nd	3rd	4th	Reverse	Final
3.943	2.197	1.413	1.020	3.145	3.120

Applications

- 2000–2006 Toyota RunX/Allex (2ZZ-GE)
- 2000–2001 Toyota Avensis VVT-i
- 2000–2005 Toyota Celica GT-S
- 2001–2004 Toyota Voltz
- 2003 Toyota Matrix XRS

=== U241E ===
Gear ratios

1st	2nd	3rd	4th	Reverse	Final
3.943	2.197	1.413	1.020	3.145	2.740

Applications

- 2001–2007 Toyota Highlander (2.4 FWD)
- 2001–2009 Toyota Ipsum (2.4 FWD Final 2.923)
- 2001–2012 Toyota RAV4 (2.0/2.4/2.5 FWD)
- 2002–2005 Toyota Camry (4 cyl.)
- 2002–2005 Toyota Avensis (4 cyl.)
- 2002–2005 Toyota Camry Solara (4 cyl.)
- 2002–2007 Toyota Alphard (4 cyl.)
- 2005–2010 Scion tC
- 2006–2009 Toyota Camry (Note: 4 cyl. "Aurion Version" in South east Asia 2.0 liter Previa)
- 2008–2015 Scion xB

=== U250E ===
Gear ratios

1st	2nd	3rd	4th	5th	Reverse	Final
3.943	2.197	1.413	0.975	0.703	3.145	3.391

Applications

- 2005–2009 Toyota Camry (4 cyl.)
- 2006–2009 Toyota Camry Solara (4 cyl.)
- 2009–2014 Toyota Matrix (2.4 L FWD)
- 2009–2010 Toyota Corolla XRS
- 2009–2010 Pontiac Vibe (2.4 L FWD)

== U3xx ==
=== U340E ===
4 speed automatic transaxle

Gear ratios

1st	2nd	3rd	4th	Reverse	Final
2.847	1.552	1.000	0.700	2.343	4.237

Applications

- 2000–2005 Toyota Echo
- 2002–2016 Toyota Vios (1.5 L 1NZ-FE)
- 2003 Toyota Corolla (1.5 L 1NZ-FE)
- 2004–2006 Scion xA
- 2004–2006 Scion xB
- 2006–2016 Toyota Yaris (1.5 L 1NZ-FE)

=== U341E ===
Gear ratios

1st	2nd	3rd	4th	Reverse	Final
2.847	1.552	1.000	0.700	2.343	4.237

Applications

- 2000–2005 Toyota Celica GT (1ZZ-FE)
- 2000-2005 Toyota Opa (1ZZ-FE)
- 2001–2010 Toyota Corolla Altis (1ZZ-FE)
- 2002–2007 Toyota Caldina (1ZZ-FE)
- 2003–2015 (2016 L model) Toyota Corolla (2ZR-FE)
- 2003–2008 Toyota Avensis (1.8 L) (1ZZ-FE)
- 2008–2012 Toyota Corolla CE (ZRE142 motor series)
- 2008–2014 Scion xD (2ZR-FE)
- 2009–2014 Toyota Matrix (2ZR-FE)

=== U341F ===
1st	2nd	3rd	4th	Reverse	Final
2.847	1.552	1.000	0.700	2.343	4.237

Applications

- 2003–2006 Toyota Matrix (AWD)
- 2003–2008 Pontiac Vibe (AWD)
- 2004 Toyota Corolla/Fielder (AWD)

== U540/U540E ==
=== U540/U540E ===
4 speed Automatic Transmission commonly used in Toyota/Daihatsu light vehicle

1st	2nd	3rd	4th	Reverse	Final
2.731	1.526	1.000	0.696	2.290	depending on the configuration

- in calya/sigra: 4.839
- in agya/ayla: 4.485
- in avanza/xenia 1.3L : 5.571
- in veloz 1.5L and Luxio: 5.125
- in rush/terios 1.5L : 5.857
- in sirion 1.3L : 4.032

== U6xx ==
Production of the U660E and U660F commenced in January 2006, Toyota's first 6-speed automatic transaxles for front-wheel-drive vehicles; transaxles feature a compact gear train that achieves six speeds using a single axis to produce a high torque of 400 Nm, and are as low cost, compact, and light as 4-speed automatic transaxles The transaxle is a Lepelletier design which uses a simple gear set to drive a Ravigneaux planetary gear set (with long and short pinion gears in the same planet carrier).

=== U660E ===
6 speed automatic transverse (V6) 6 speed version of the U151E and F

Applications

- 2006–2019 Toyota Previa/Tarago (V6)
- 2007–2017 Toyota Camry (V6)
- 2007–2018 Lexus ES 350
- 2007–2017 Toyota Aurion (V6)
- 2007–2012 Toyota Blade (V6)
- 2007–2013 Toyota Mark X Zio (V6)
- 2008–2018 Toyota Avalon
- 2008–2018 Toyota Alphard (V6)
- 2009–2017 Toyota Venza
- 2010–2015 Lexus RX350
- 2011–2016 Toyota Sienna
- 2012–2021 Lotus Evora ("IPS")
- 2012–2021 Lotus Exige
- 2019–2023 Lexus LM 350 (Hong Kong version)
- 2022– Lotus Emira

1st	2nd	3rd	4th	5th	6th	Reverse	Final
3.300	1.900	1.421	1.000	0.713	0.609	4.148	Varies

U660E Final Drive Ratios

Avalon 08-12	Avalon 13-15	Blade 07-12	Camry 08-11	Camry 12-15	Highlander 14-15	Sienna 11-15	Venza 09-15	Zio 07-13	Lotus Evora
3.685	3.238	3.685	3.685	3.458	4.154	3.935	4.398	3.685	3.685

=== U660F ===
Applications

- 2008–2012 Lexus RX 350 AWD
- 2009–2017 Toyota Venza AWD
- 2009–2018 Toyota RAV4 D-CAT A/T
- 2011–2016 Toyota Sienna AWD
- 2014–2016 Toyota Highlander AWD

=== U661E/F ===
6 speed automatic communicates with engine to calculate torque with reduced-friction clutch and thrust bearings multi-mode automatic transmission, electronically controlled transmission with intelligence (ECT-i).

Applications

- 2015–2021 Lexus NX 200t (NX 300 from 2019)
- 2016–2022 Lexus RX 200t (RX 300 from 2019)
- 2017–2020 Toyota Harrier turbo

1st	2nd	3rd	4th	5th	6th	Reverse	Final FWD	Final AWD
3.300	1.900	1.420	1.000	0.713	0.608	4.148	3.888	4.117

2WD	AWD
3.888	4.117

== U760E/F ==
=== U760E/F ===
6 speed automatic transaxle (I4) 6 speed version light duty version of the U660E/F

Applications

- 2008–2016 Toyota Venza (2.7 L FWD)
- 2008–2018 Toyota RAV4 (2.5 L FWD)
- 2009–2017, 2018–2021 Toyota Camry (2.5 L) (XV70 in some markets)
- 2010–2012 Toyota Sienna (2.7 L FWD)
- 2010–2019 Toyota Highlander (2.7 L FWD)
- 2011–2016 Scion tC
- 2012–2018 Toyota RAV4 (2.2 L FWD)

1st	2nd	3rd	4th	5th	6th	Reverse	Final
3.300	1.900	1.420	1.000	0.713	0.608	4.148	3.815

=== U761E ===
Application

- 2015–2024 Toyota Camry (I4)

=== U760F ===
Applications

- 2009–2018 Toyota Venza (I4/AWD)
- 2011–2012 Toyota Sienna (I4/AWD)
- 2013–2018 Toyota RAV4 (I4/AWD)

== UA80E/F, UB80E/F, UB81E/F ==
Production of the UA 80E and UA 80F commenced in August 2016. This transaxle features a compact gear train that achieves eight speeds using a single axis allowing for input torque up to 430Nm. It is a more compact and optimized version of the U880 automatic transmission structure with additional features for improved performance and efficiency. The marketing name for the transmission is the "Direct Shift – 8AT 8-speed automatic transmission" Unlike the UB 80 transmission, which was developed for Toyota by Aisin AW, the UA 80 was developed in a joint venture between Toyota and Aisin AW. Due to global application, development was done in a global fashion involving engineering resources in both Japan and the US. The UB 80E/F transmissions are used for lower torque applications, 4 cylinder engines, and rated at 280 N⋅m (207 lb⋅ft).

== Specifications ==
Gear Ratios (Note: Differences in gear ratios have a measurable, direct impact on vehicle dynamics, performance, waste emissions as well as fuel mileage)
Aisin	Toyota	First Delivery	Gear										Total Span			Avg. Step	Components	
Aisin	Toyota	First Delivery	R2 (Note: Logically, the gearset concept (layout) provides for this 2nd reverse gear, but it will most likely not be used in the transmissions that the car manufacturers eventually bring to market. In some data sheets, the gear ratio of R2 is given, presumably a careless error)	R1	1	2	3	4	5	6	7	8	Nomi- nal	Effec- tive	Cen- ter	Avg. Step	Total	per Gear (Note: Forward gears only)
AW F8 F45	UA 80E/F	2016	−2.059	−4.221	5.519	3.184	2.050	1.492	1.235	1.000	0.801	0.673	8.200	6.271	1.927	1.351	3 Gearsets; 2 Brakes; 4 Clutches	1.125
AW F8 F35	UB 80E/F	2016	−2.059	−4.015	5.250	3.029	1.950	1.457	1.221	1.000	0.809	0.673	7.800	5.965	1.880	1.341	3 Gearsets; 2 Brakes; 4 Clutches	1.125
TG-80LS	UB 80E/F	2017	−2.053	−4.003	5.070	2.972	1.950	1.4698	1.231	1.000	0.808	0.672	7.540	5.953	1.846	1.335	3 Gearsets; 2 Brakes; 4 Clutches	1.125
TBD	TBD	TBD	−2.182	−4.255	5.200	2.971	1.950	1.4700	1.224	1.000	0.817	0.686	7.583	6.205	1.888	1.336	3 Gearsets; 2 Brakes; 4 Clutches	1.125

=== UA80E ===
Based on Aisin–Toyota 8-speed automatic transmission. 8 speed direct shift automatic transverse for high torque (430 Nm) applications (V6).

Applications

- 2017–2024 Toyota Camry
- 2017–2018 Toyota Highlander V6
- 2017–2020 Toyota Sienna
- 2019–2022 Toyota Avalon
- 2019– Lexus ES 350

=== UA80F ===
Based on Aisin–Toyota 8-speed automatic transmission.

Applications

- 2017– Toyota Highlander 2.5 L
- 2017–2020 Toyota Sienna
- 2018–2023 Toyota Alphard V6
- 2019–2022 Toyota Highlander V6

=== UB80E ===
Based on Aisin–Toyota 8-speed automatic transmission. 8 speed direct shift automatic transverse for low torque (280 Nm) applications.

Applications

- 2018– Toyota Camry 2.5 L
- 2019– Toyota RAV4 2.5 L

=== UA80F ===
Based on Aisin–Toyota 8-speed automatic transmission. 8 speed automatic transaxle (V6).

Application

- 2012–2015 Lexus RX F-Sport (North America, V6)

=== UA81E/F ===
Based on Aisin–Toyota 8-speed automatic transmission. 8 speed automatic transaxle (V6).

Application

- 2023– Toyota Highlander 2.4 T
- 2024– Toyota Grand Highlander 2.4 T

== UA80E/F Drivability Complaints and Subsequent Lawsuits ==
Owners of 2017 and up Highlanders and Sienna models starting experiencing noises, harsh shifts, malfunction indications and reduced power. These issues lead to several Class Action lawsuits which prompted Toyota to issue numerous TSBs and the ZJC Customer Support Program. The ZJC Customer Support Program only covers a small number of 2017 & 2018 UA80 transmissions.

Similar, if not the same, issues that the ZJC Customer Support Program cover continue to occur in later model years of Highlander and Sienna models. This is leaving customers to believe the scope is larger than what Toyota is indicating.

In December 2024, Gears Magazine published an article shedding some light into the cause of the UA80 drivability issues. The main focus is the drive gear assembly support bearing area where the retaining nut comes loose and allows the transfer gear to move.

In December 2025, a $5 million class-action lawsuit was filed against Toyota in the U.S. District Court for the Central District of California, alleging failures of the UA80 transmission.

== UP3xx ==
=== P311 ===
CVT automatic transaxle

Applications

- 2007– Toyota Camry Hybrid
- 2009–2017 Toyota Sai
- 2009–2017 Lexus HS 250h

=== P410 ===
- 2010– Toyota Prius

== See also ==
- Toyota A transmission
- List of Toyota transmissions: automatic and manual transmissions
- List of Aisin transmissions
- List of Toyota engines
