= List of Aisin transmissions =

Motor vehicle automatic and manual transmissions

Aisin is a Japanese corporation that develops and produces components and systems for the automotive industry, in particular automobile transmissions for passenger cars and SUVs, light commercial vehicles such as vans and light trucks. Aisin is a member of the Toyota Group of companies. Therefore, the transmissions of both manufacturers are often based on identical gearset concepts.

Basically there are two types of motor vehicle transmissions:

- Manual – the driver has to perform each gear change using a manually operated clutch
- Automatic – once placed in drive (or any other 'automatic' selector position), it automatically selects the gear ratio dependent on engine speed and load

Basically there are two types of engine installation:

- In the longitudinal direction, the gearbox is usually designed separately from the final drive (including the differential). The transaxle configuration combines the gearbox and final drive in one housing and is only built in individual cases
- In the transverse direction, the gearbox and final drive are very often combined in one housing due to the much more restricted space available

Every type of transmission occurs in every type of installation.

== Automatic transmissions ==
=== History ===
Aisin automatic transmissions are manufactured by Aisin-Warner (AW) which was established in 1969 as a joint venture between Aisin and BorgWarner. While Aisin Seiki manufactures a variety of automotive components including automatic transmissions for heavy duty vehicle applications, Aisin AW manufactures automatic transmissions for light vehicle applications, including hybrid electric vehicle powertrains, as well as NAV Radio.

As of 2005, Aisin AW surpassed General Motors Powertrain Division as the largest producer of automatic transmissions in the world, producing 4.9 million units, with a market share of 16.4% of the global market for automatics. Toyota and Aisin Seiki are the two major shareholders of Aisin AW, with 51.9% and 42% respectively. Aisin AW, which was set up to be the sole source of RWD automatic transmissions to Toyota, subsequently developed FWD/AWD automatic transmissions. Aisin, as one of the major Toyota group suppliers, shares many designs and development activities with Toyota. See Toyota A transmission for a complete list of Toyota/Aisin models. Aisin AW supplies automatic transmissions to 55 automotive manufacturers around the world, virtually every major OEM. These include General Motors, Ford, Jeep, Mitsubishi, Nissan, Saab, VW, Volvo, Hyundai, MINI among others.

=== Longitudinal ===
- T35 - 3-speed longitudinal
- T65/T66 - 3-speed longitudinal
- Aisin A172 - 3-speed longitudinal class micro (Suzuki Samurai)
- Aisin A174 - 4-speed longitudinal class micro (Suzuki Jimny)
- Aisin TW-40E - 4-speed longitudinal class micro (Suzuki Jimny)
- Aisin 03-72LE (GM M41) — 4-speed longitudinal (Suzuki Escudo/Sidekick/Vitara, Chevrolet Tracker 4-door, Suzuki APV, Isuzu Panther, Suzuki X-90, Mazda MX-5 NB, Mazda Levante, Toyota Innova 2.0 (1st gen) & Toyota HiAce)
- Aisin 03-72LS — 4-speed longitudinal (Suzuki Grand Vitara 5-door)
- Aisin TB-50LS — 5-speed longitudinal (Suzuki Grand Vitara 3.2 V6 5-door, Isuzu MU-X 2.5), also known as Toyota A750F
- 450-43LE — 4-speed longitudinal (Isuzu NPR Cab-Over Truck)
- AW-4 (Similar to the A340H) 4-speed longitudinal
  - 1987–2001 Jeep Cherokee
  - 1993 Jeep Grand Cherokee
  - 1987–1992 Jeep Comanche
- AW70 Volvo 240, 740 and 940 series cars starting from 1982 up to 1998
- AW71 Volvo 760, 940, and some 740s and 240s with turbocharged and higher-output naturally aspirated engines
- AW72 Volvo 16-valve B234F 4-cylinder engine found in the 740 GLE
- AS68RC (2007-2012 Dodge Ram 6.7 L 3500/4500/5500 Cab Chassis) 6-speed longitudinal
- AS69RC (2013-current Dodge Ram 6.7 L 3500/4500/5500 Cab Chassis, and optional in some 3500 model trucks Dodge Ram 3500 Pickup) 6-speed longitudinal with more robust components and a new control system
- A466ND (2016- Nissan Titan XD) 6-speed longitudinal, similar ratios to the AS69RC but developed exclusively for the 2nd gen Titan
- AS66RC (2014-Current Dodge Ram 3500/4500/5500 Cab Chassis with Gasoline Engine) 6-speed longitudinal apparently derived from AS69RC
- Aisin B-600 transmission. 6-speed longitudinal (Hyundai Genesis 3.8)
- Aisin R6AWH / V6AWH transmission. 6-speed longitudinal
- Aisin TR-60SN/09D - 6-speed HD longitudinal used by the Volkswagen Group in SUVs: Volkswagen Touareg (2002-2010), Porsche Cayenne (2002-2010) and Audi Q7 (2005-2010) (Volkswagen transmission code: 09D)
- AW TB60-LS, 6-speed longitudinal
- TB-61SN, 6-speed longitudinal
- TB-68LS, 6-speed longitudinal
- Aisin AWR6B45, 6 speed longitudinal (Toyota Fortuner 2.4, Toyota Innova 2.4)
- Aisin AWR6B45-II, 6 speed longitudinal Isuzu MU-X 1.9 4x4
- Aisin TL-80SN - 8-speed longitudinal
- Aisin TR-80SD/TL-80NF - 8 speed longitudinal Volkswagen Touareg (2011-2017), Porsche Cayenne (2011-2016), Audi Q7 (2011-2015) (Volkswagen transmission code: 0C8) and Hongqi HS7, Toyota Land Cruiser (2015-2021), Lexus LX570 (2015-2021) and Mitsubishi Pajero Sport (2015-2021) (Toyota transmission code: AE80F)
- Aisin TR-81SD/TR-82SD - 8-speed HD longitudinal Volkswagen Touareg (2011-2017), Audi Q7 (2011-2015) Porsche Cayenne (2011-2017), Porsche Panamera (2011-2016) (Volkswagen transmission code: 0C8)
- Aisin LB500-Isuzu RevTronic - 8 speed longitudinal (Isuzu D-Max & Isuzu Mux)
- Aisin AWR10L65 - 10-speed Direct Shift-10A longitudinal (LS 350 & LS 500, LX (J310), Land Cruiser (J300), Tundra (XK70))
- Aisin AWRHM50 - 10-speed Multi-Stage Hybrid System longitudinal (LS 500h)

=== Transverse ===
- T35TB/T37TB - 3-speed transverse
- 50-40LE/50-42LE — 4-speed transverse
  - 1996—2002 Volvo C70
  - 1998—2003 Saab 9-3
- 60-40LE — 4-speed transverse
- 80-40LE — 4-speed transverse
  - 2002— Pontiac G3
  - 2002— Ford Fiesta/Ford Fusion (Europe) 1.6
  - 2004— Chevrolet Aveo
  - 2004— Daewoo Kalos
  - 2004— Suzuki Swift
  - 2004— Toyota Echo, Yaris, Vitz (Toyota U440E)
  - 2013 Chevrolet Spark
- Aisin AF23 transmission — 5-speed transverse
- 55-50SN/RE5F22A/AF33-5 — 5-speed transverse
- TF-60SN - 6-speed transverse
  - Volkswagen transmission code 09G, 09M, 09K
    - 2003—2010 Volkswagen Transporter T5
    - 2007 Volkswagen Jetta, US market
    - 2009 Volkswagen Tiguan, US market
    - various Seat, Skoda, Audi models
  - 2005—2011 Mini Cooper, Code 6F21WA
  - 2012— BMW 2 Series F45 ActiveTourer and F46 Gran Tourer with 3-cylinder engines, Code 6F21WA (8-speed models use the AW F8 F35 transmission)
  - Mini F54, F55, F56, F57, F60 with 6-speed automatic (8-speed models use the AW F8 F35 transmission)
  - BMW X1 (F48) with 3-cylinder engines 6-speed automatic (4-cylinder models use the 8-speed AW F8 F35 transmission, AW F8 45 and AW F8 22 AW)
- Aisin TF-70SC - 6-speed transverse
- Aisin AW60T-6F25 Automatic, Fiat 500 Abarth, Fiat 500L, Jeep Commander (2022)
- Aisin AWTF-80SC/TF-81SC/AF21 transmission — 6-speed transverse
- Aisin FF Series - 6-speed transverse
  - Aisin TM-60LS - 6-speed transverse
  - TF60-Series AWF6F16 - 6-speed transverse
  - TF70-Series Aisin AWF6F25 (300Nm) - 6-speed transverse
    - Groupe PSA transmission code AT6-III (EAT6)
      - Peugeot 208, 508 II, 308 II, 408 II, 2008, 3008 II, 5008 II
      - Citroën C3 III, C4 II, C4 Picasso II
      - DS DS3
  - TF80-Series Aisin AWF6F45 (450 N⋅m (332 lb⋅ft)) - 6-speed transverse
    - Groupe PSA transmission code AM6-III (EAT6)
- Aisin FF Series - 8-speed transverse
  - TG-Series
    - Aisin AW F8 G30 - Max Torque 300 N⋅m (221 lb⋅ft)
      - Groupe PSA transmission code AXN8 (EAT8)
        - Used with these engines:
      - - EB2ADTD - 1.2 PureTech 100 / EB2ADTS - 1.2 PureTech 130 / EB2ADTX - 1.2 PureTech 155
      - - EP6FADTXD - 1.6 PureTech 180 / EP6FADTX - 1.6 PureTech 225
      - - DV5RC - 1.5 BlueHDI 130
    - Aisin AW F8 F45 - 8-speed heavy-duty 430 N⋅m (317 lb⋅ft)

== e-CVT transmissions ==
- Aisin T-030 transmission — Hybrid Electric Planetary (Ford Escape Hybrid), transverse
- Aisin T-031 transmission — Hybrid Electric Planetary (Ford Escape Hybrid), transverse
- Aisin T-100 transmission — Hybrid Electric Planetary (Lexus GS450h), longitudinal
- Aisin K-111 transmission — Hybrid Electric Planetary (Toyota Camry Hybrid), transverse
- Aisin AWFHT15 (Toyota Prius)
- Aisin AWRHM50

== Manual transmissions ==
Aisin manual and automated manual transmissions are manufactured by Aisin AI.

=== Longitudinal rear-wheel drive ===
- 1984-1992– AX4 — 4-speed
  - 1984-1987 Jeep Cherokee
  - 1986-1992 Jeep Comanche
- 1984-2002– AX5 — 5-speed
  - 1984-2000 Jeep Cherokee
  - 1986-1992 Jeep Comanche
  - 1987-2002 Jeep Wrangler
- 1988-1999– AX15 — 5-speed
  - 1989-1999 Jeep Cherokee
  - 1989-1992 Jeep Comanche
  - 1993 Jeep Grand Cherokee
  - 1989-1999 Jeep Wrangler
- 2018-Present- AL6 (D478) — 6-speed
  - 2018- Jeep Wrangler (JL)
  - 2020- Jeep Gladiator (JT)
- May 1997– AH15/AH16 — 6-speed
  - Toyota Dyna, Toyota Coaster, Hino Dutro
- December 1997– AZ6 — 6-speed
  - Mazda MX-5/Roadster/Miata, Nissan Silvia, Mazda RX-8, Toyota Altezza/Lexus IS200, Toyota 86/Scion FR-S/Subaru BR-Z
- May 1999– AW5 — 5-speed
  - Toyota Hilux, Toyota Tacoma, Suzuki Grand Vitara/Escudo
- October 2003– AM15 — 5-speed
  - Toyota Dyna, Hino Dutro
- February 2004– AY6 — 6-speed longitudinal
  - Toyota Land Cruiser Prado, Toyota Tundra, Toyota Tacoma, Cadillac CTS, Holden Commodore
- 2005— AR5 — 5-speed longitudinal (GM RPO MA5)
  - Toyota Hilux, Toyota Land Cruiser/Prado, Isuzu Trooper/Bighorn, Suzuki Grand Vitara/Escudo, BMC Levend, Chevrolet Colorado, GMC Canyon, Hummer H3, Pontiac Solstice, Saturn Sky, Polaris Slingshot
- AH5 — 5-speed longitudinal
  - Toyota Land Cruiser
- AG5 — 5-speed longitudinal
  - Toyota Hilux, Toyota Hiace, Suzuki Grand Vitara/Escudo, Chevrolet Niva
- AM5 — 5-speed longitudinal
  - Toyota Dyna, Toyota Coaster, Hino Dutro

=== Transverse front-wheel drive ===
- December 1998– BC5 — 5-speed
  - Toyota Yaris/Vitz
- August 1999– BC16 — 6-speed
  - Toyota Celica, Toyota MR-2, Toyota Corolla
- December 2002– MC5 — 5-speed automated manual
  - Toyota Yaris/Vitz, Suzuki Swift
- June 2002– BE35 — 5-speed
  - Toyota Avensis, Toyota RAV4
- January 2004– MC25 — 5-speed automated manual
  - Toyota Corolla
- February 2005– BG6 — 6-speed
  - Toyota Avensis, Toyota Corolla, Toyota RAV4, Mazda6, Mazda5, Mitsubishi Eclipse, Mitsubishi Grandis, Jeep Compass, Jeep Patriot, Dodge Caliber, Dodge Journey, Lotus Exige, Lotus Evora
- 2005–present Aisin AWF-21, FWD - 5 & 6-speed
  - Ford Five Hundred, Ford Fusion -till 2009,Ford Mondeo 2007-2011, Mercury Montego, Mercury Milan -till 2009, Lincoln Zephyr/MKZ,2010-2014, MG6 Petrol & Diesel, Roewe 550, Mazda6, Mazda CX-7, Mazda CX-9, Land Rover LR2

=== Longitudinal rear-wheel drive (transaxle) ===
- SP6 — 6-speed
  - Porsche 997
- SA6 - 6-speed
  - Lexus LFA

=== Others ===
- April 1997– BC6 — 6-speed
- August 1998– AP2 — industrial

== See also ==
- List of Toyota transmissions
- Toyota A transmission
- Toyota U transmission
