= Hongqi HS7 =

Mid-size luxury crossover SUV

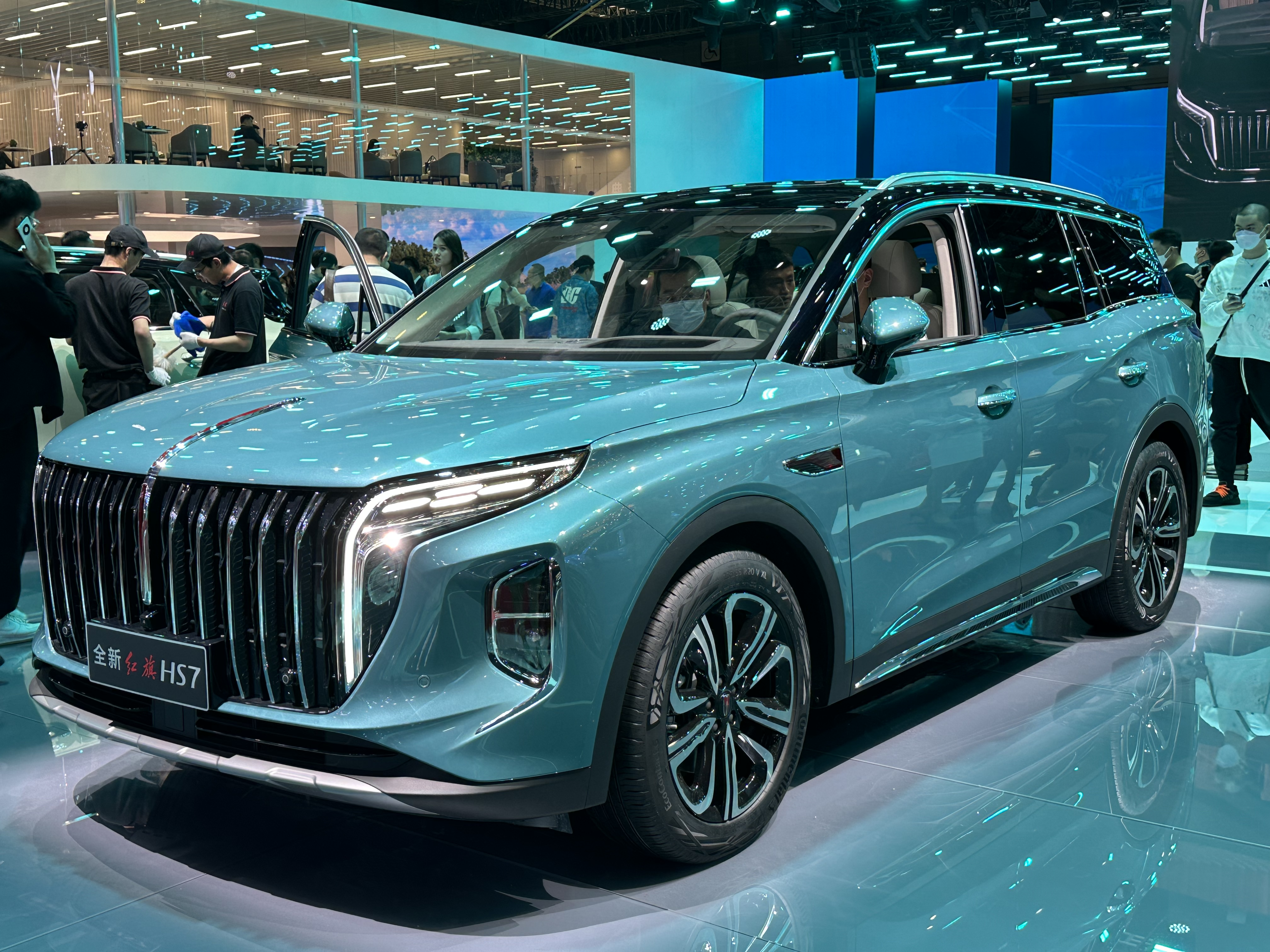

Overview
- Manufacturer: Hongqi (FAW Group)
- Production: 2019–present

Body and chassis
- Class: Mid-size luxury crossover SUV
- Body style: 5-door SUV

The Hongqi HS7 is a mid-size luxury crossover SUV produced by Chinese automobile manufacturer Hongqi, a subsidiary of FAW Group from 2019.

== First generation (2019–present) ==
First generation
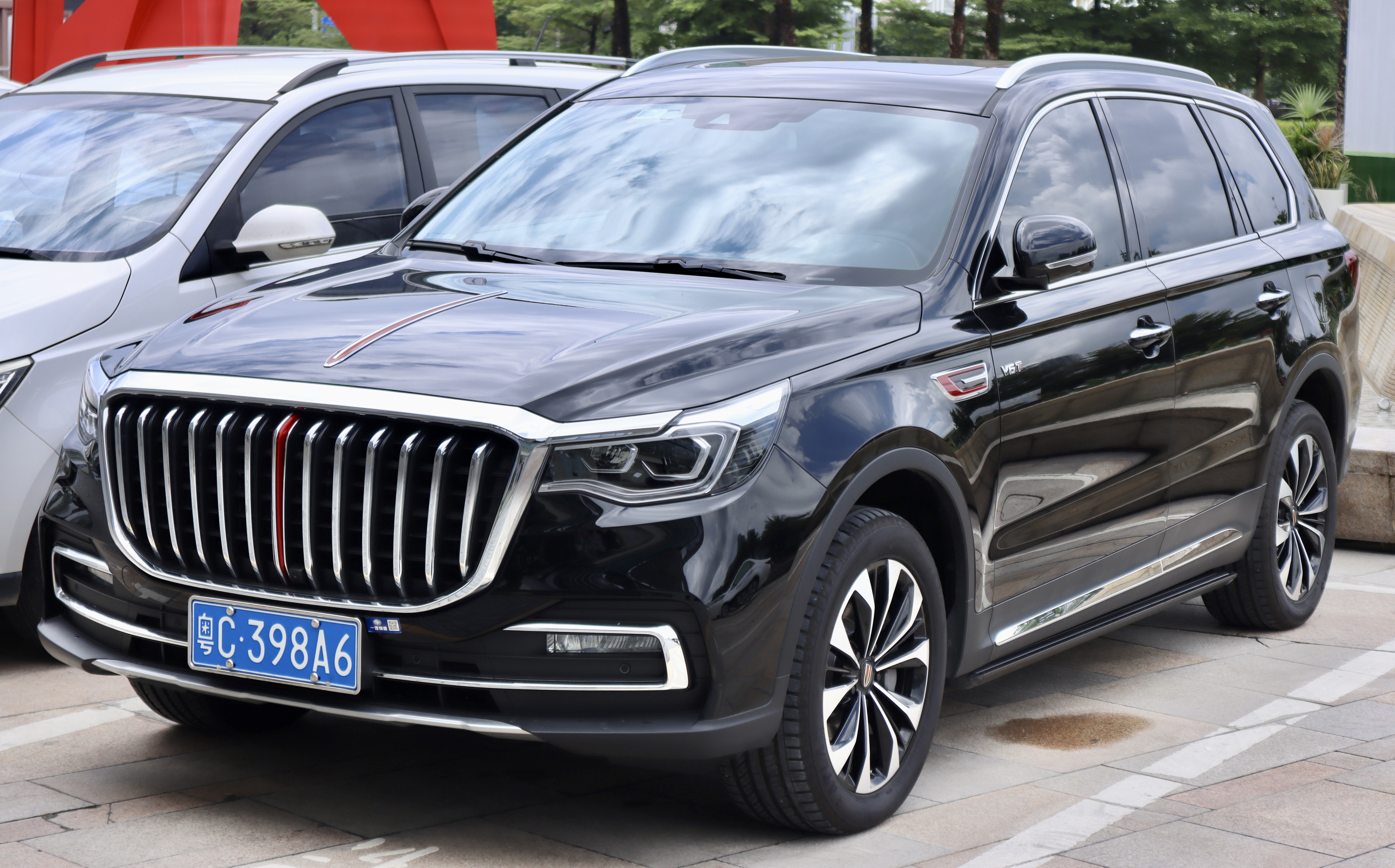

Overview
- Production: 2019–2023 (China); 2019–present (Middle East)
- Model years: 2019–present
- Assembly: China: Changchun, Jilin

Body and chassis
- Class: Mid-size luxury crossover SUV
- Body style: 5-door SUV
- Layout: Longitudinal FR layout Longitudinal F4 layout

Powertrain
- Engine: 2.0 L CA4GC20TD I4 (turbo petrol); 3.0 L CA6GV30TD V6 (supercharged petrol)
- Transmission: 7-speed dual-clutch transmission (2.0 L); 8-speed automatic (3.0 L)

Dimensions
- Wheelbase: 3,008 mm (118.4 in); 3,508 mm (138.1 in) (HS7+)
- Length: 5,035 mm (198.2 in); 5,535 mm (217.9 in) (HS7+)
- Width: 1,989 mm (78.3 in)
- Height: 1,778 mm (70.0 in)
- Kerb weight: 2,120–2,320 kg (4,670–5,110 lb)

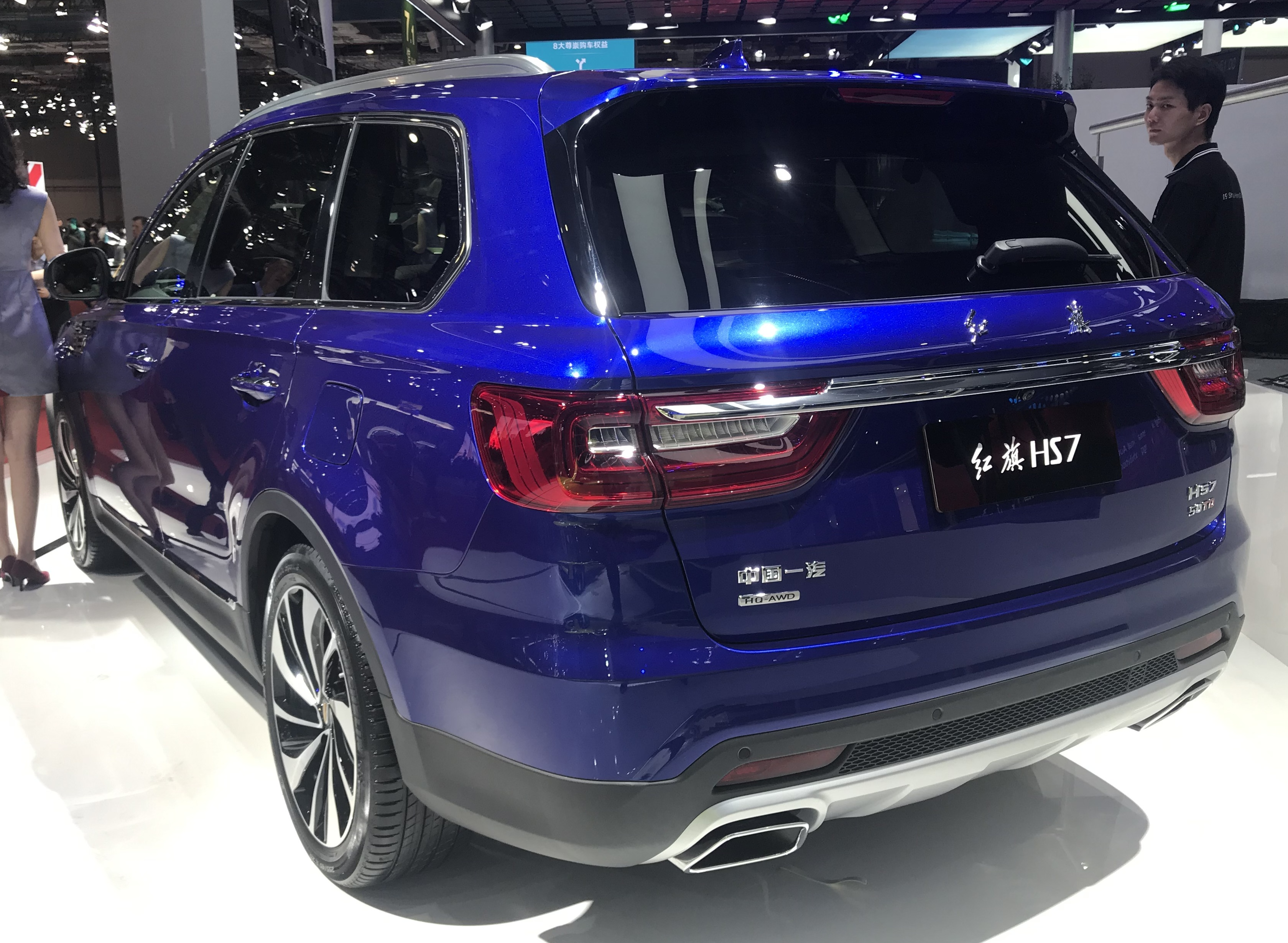
Hongqi HS7 rear

The Hongqi HS7 is powered by a 3.0 liter supercharged engine producing 337 horsepower and 445 N.m, mated to an 8-speed automatic gearbox. The 0 to 100 km/h (0-62 mph) acceleration time is 7.8 seconds. For the 2021 model year, a 2.0 liter turbocharged engine producing 252 horsepower and 380 N.m, mated to a 7-speed dual-clutch gearbox was added to the product line.

All 3.0 liter models came standard with full-time four-wheel drive system while all 2.0 liter models came standard with rear-wheel drive system.

The interior of the base model includes a 12.3 inch full LCD instrument and a 10.1 inch large central control screen. The price of the Hongqi HS7 ranged from 275,800 yuan to 459,800 yuan (~US$41,273 – US$68,809).

== Second generation (2023–present) ==
Second generation
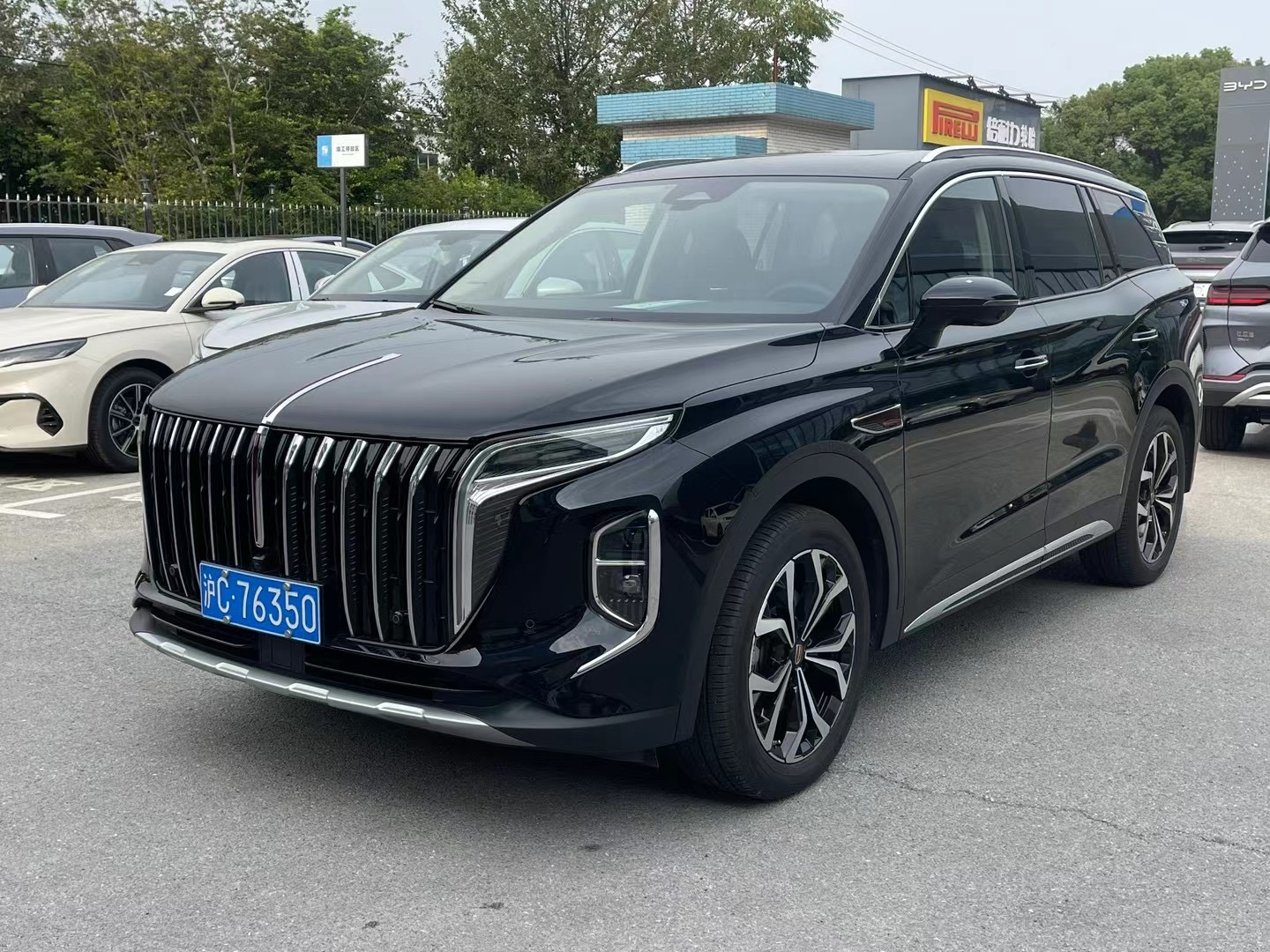

Overview
- Production: 2023–present
- Model years: 2023–present
- Assembly: China: Changchun, Jilin

Body and chassis
- Class: Mid-size luxury crossover SUV
- Body style: 5-door SUV
- Layout: Transverse FF layout/4WD

Powertrain
- Engine: 2.0 L CA4GC20TD-35 I4 (turbo petrol)
- Transmission: 8-speed Aisin AWF8F45 Automatic transmission

Dimensions
- Wheelbase: 2,920 mm (115.0 in)
- Length: 4,995 mm (196.7 in)
- Width: 1,960 mm (77.2 in)
- Height: 1,760 mm (69.3 in)
- Kerb weight: 2,070 kg (4,560 lb)

During the 2023 Auto Shanghai, the second generation Hongqi HS7 was unveiled. It received a significant redesign with enhancements in both its exterior and interior.

The interior has been changed comprehensively, featuring a 12.3-inch LCD instrument panel, paired with a 12.6-inch central control screen and a Head-Up Display (HUD).

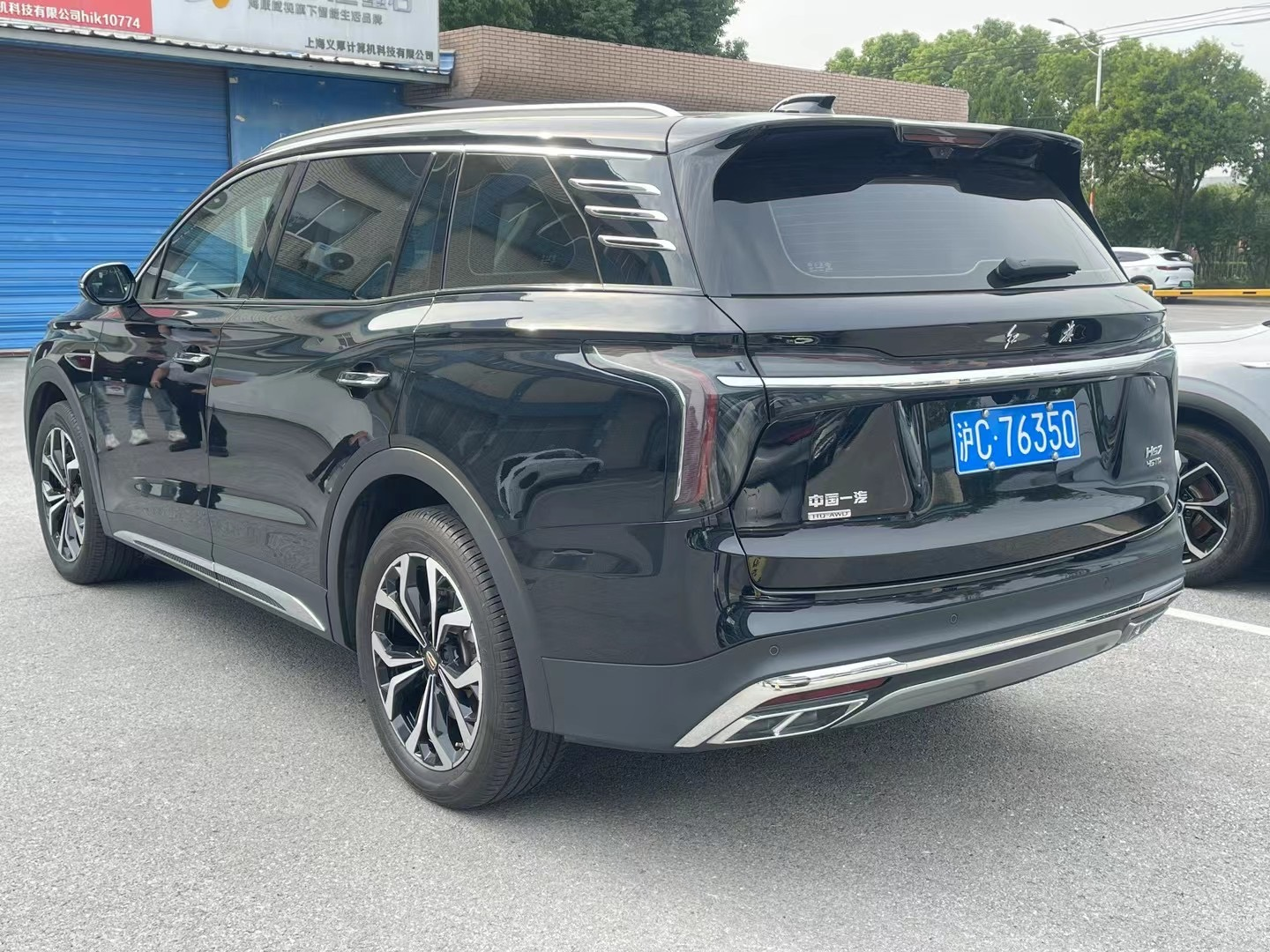
Rear view

It is equipped with the CA4GC20TD-35 2.0-liter I4 turbocharged engine from FAW, which has 350-bar high-pressure fuel injection system and dual-channel, low-inertia, high-response electronic boost control. It delivers a power of 185 kW and a peak torque of 380 N·m. Additionally, the vehicle benefits from a 48V mild hybrid system paired with Aisin's AWF8F45 8-speed automatic transmission. The 3.0-liter V6 engine option is cancelled in the second generation HS7.

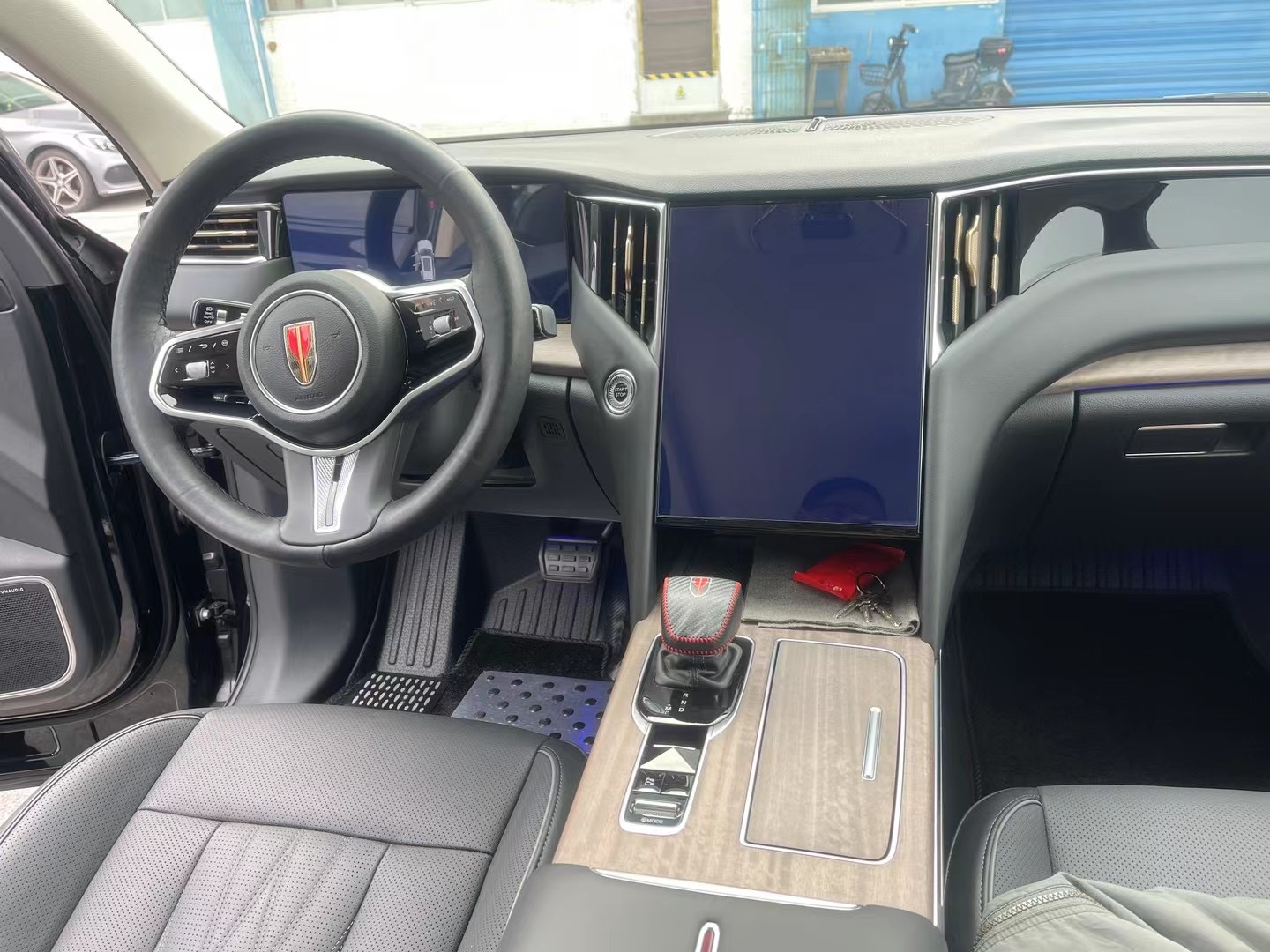
Interior

=== Sales ===
Year	China		
Year	HS7	PHEV	Total
2023	7,726	—	7,726
2024	2,084	4,579	6,663
2025	1,228	7,664	8,892
