= 1997 Aisin fire =

Building fire in Kariya, Japan

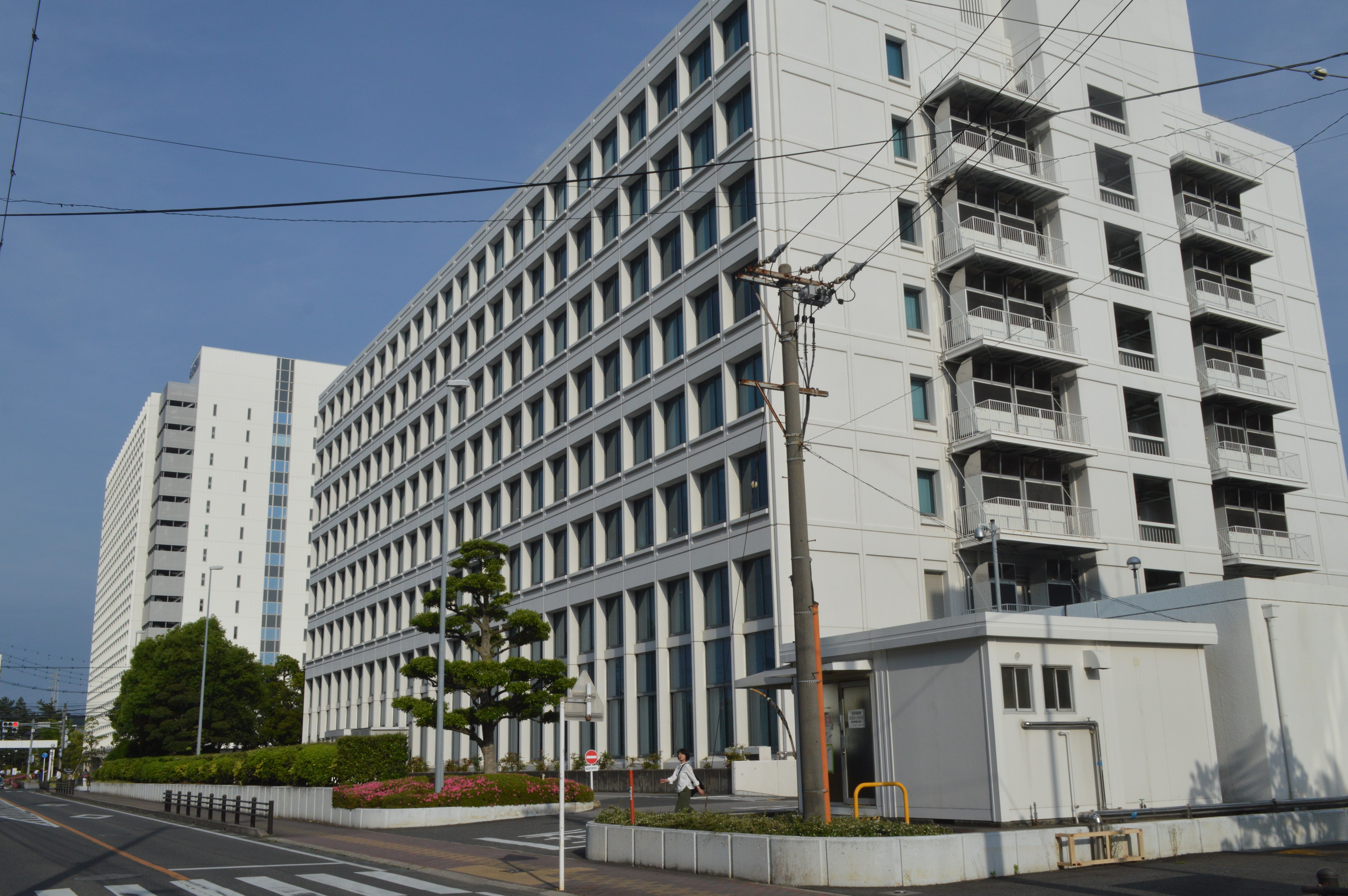
Headquarters of AISIN SEIKI Co., Ltd., Kariya city, Aichi prefecture, Japan.

The 1997 Aisin fire is the fire that shut down one of the production facilities of the Toyota-subsidiary Aisin Seiki Co. on February 1, 1997, a Saturday. The event was notable as the factory was the main supplier of a motor part for Toyota cars. Due to the just in time stock keeping philosophy of the Toyota Production System (TPS), Toyota's car factories reportedly only kept four-hour stocks of the part.

The event provided an example of successful business relationships between Toyota and its suppliers, allowing the company to quickly manufacture replacement parts and limit the halt in production of its cars, thereby minimizing the losses from this event.

== The fire ==
The fire broke out before dawn on February 1, 1997 at Factory No. 10 of Aisin Seiki Co. in Kariya, Japan. The cause of the fire was reportedly unknown.

The factory produced brake fluid proportioning valves (P-valves), which regulate pressure to the rear breaks to help prevent skidding and are used in the braking systems of all Toyota vehicles.

Approximately 99% of Toyota's P-valves were manufactured at this plant, with the remaining 1% produced by Nissin Kogyo Co. Production of P-valves was complex, requiring specialised tooling, and multiple variants of the component were manufactured simultaneously.

With the factory out of production, it was estimated that Toyota would have to halt car production for weeks. The economic impact of this would have been huge for Toyota, the local economy and for Japan. It was estimated that each day Toyota production was halted would lead to a 0.1% decrease in Japan's industrial output.

== Recovery ==
Aisin, along with Toyota, set up a crisis room to deal with the problem of manufacturing new P-valves. Toyota managed to get many of its suppliers to bring in additional engineers, and work overtime shifts, to help build machines to produce P-valves, as well as increase production of the components. Some of Toyota's suppliers, and their subcontractors, were persuaded to give priority to the production of P-valves. Even a sewing machine manufacturer was persuaded to help provide valves for Toyota.

The first usable valves were delivered to Toyota on the Wednesday (February 5) following the fire, allowing production of cars to resume. While observers initially predicted that Toyota would have to halt production for weeks, the incident ultimately set Toyota's production back only five days.

== Lessons from the fire ==
The fire and the subsequent production crisis held many lessons for Toyota. It showed them that their implementation of the Just In Time production system worked, and that they had "the right balance of efficiency and risk". Toyota also learned to reduce the number of variations in its parts to make production easier as well as to reduce risk. Toyota's suppliers also had the benefit of increasing efficiency in their production as well as learning the lessons of building redundancy into their production methods.

The efficiency with which production was re-established also showed the value of the Japanese keiretsu system, where businesses have "interlocking" relationships with each other. The loyalty shown by Toyota's suppliers to the company showed it the value of long-term business relationships: the suppliers reportedly did not ask what they would be paid for rushing out the valves; Aisin and Toyota later reimbursed them for the work, including the valves, overtime and re-tooling of their machines, as well as providing a $100 million bonus to the suppliers involved.

== See also ==
- Aisin Seiki Co.
- Toyota Production System
