= Changan UNI-V =

Compact sedan

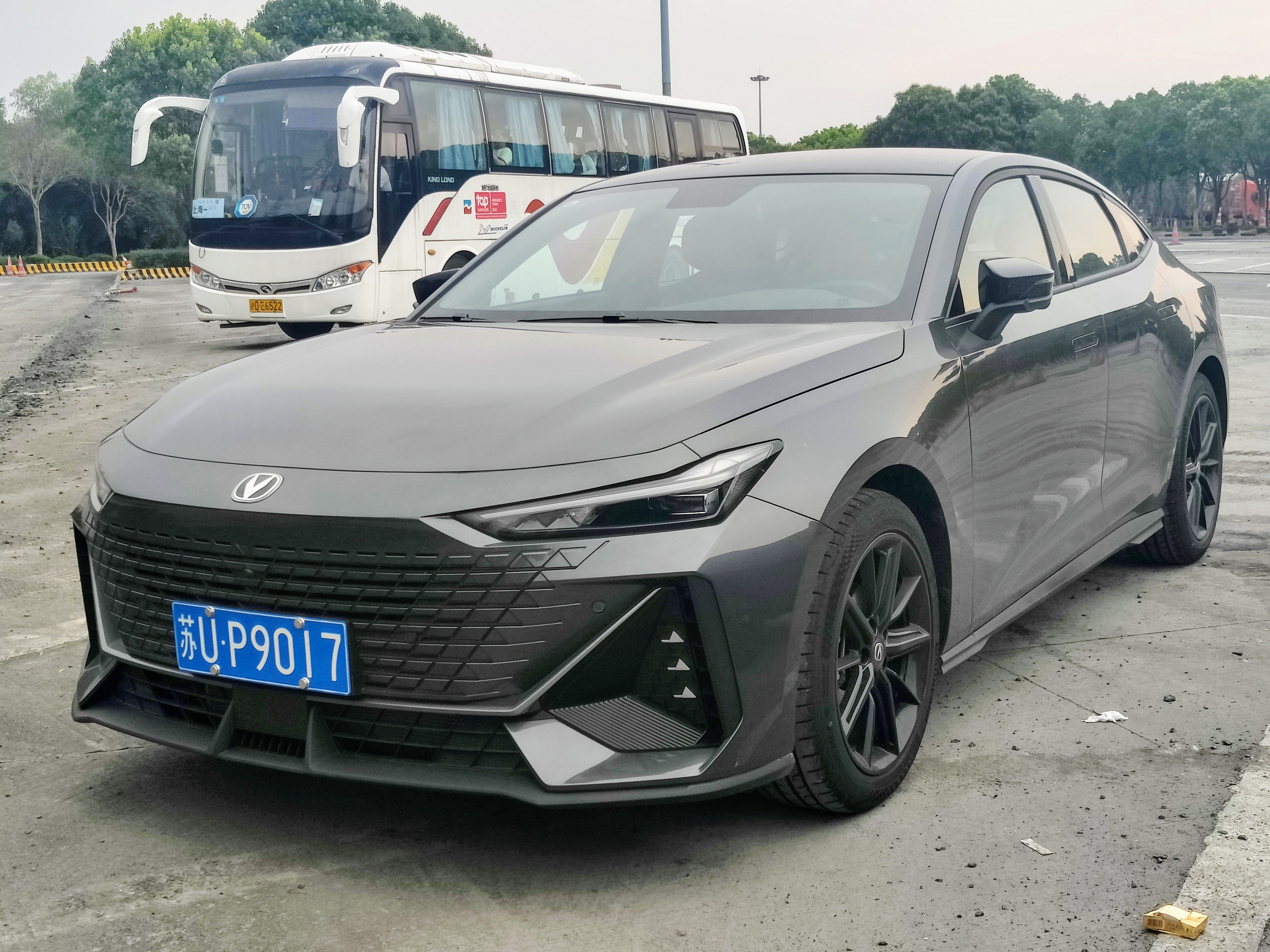

Overview
- Manufacturer: Changan
- Also called: Changan Nevo A06 (PHEV, cancelled)
- Production: 2021–present
- Model years: 2022–present
- Assembly: China: Chongqing

Body and chassis
- Class: Compact car (C)
- Body style: 5-door liftback
- Layout: Front-engine, front-wheel-drive
- Platform: Ark platform

Powertrain
- Engine: Petrol; 1.5 L Blue Whale I4 (turbo); 2.0 L Blue Whale I4; Petrol–PHEV; 1.5 L Blue Whale iDD I4 (turbo); 1.5 L Blue Whale I4 (81 kilowatts (109 hp; 110 PS) Generator)
- Electric motor: 123 kilowatts (165 hp; 167 PS) Permanent Magnet motor (UNI-V iDD); 140 kilowatts (188 hp; 190 PS) or 158 kilowatts (212 hp; 215 PS) Permanent Magnet motor (Changan Nevo A06)
- Transmission: 7-speed DCT; 6-speed automatic 8-speed Aisin AWF8F35 automatic
- Hybrid drivetrain: PHEV (Changan Nevo A06, UNI-V iDD)
- Battery: 18.4kWh LFP

Dimensions
- Wheelbase: 2,750 mm (108.3 in)
- Length: 4,680 mm (184.3 in)
- Width: 1,838 mm (72.4 in)
- Height: 1,430 mm (56.3 in)
- Curb weight: 1,400–1,680 kg (3,086–3,704 lb)

The Changan UNI-V is a compact sedan produced by Chinese auto manufacturer Changan.

== Overview ==
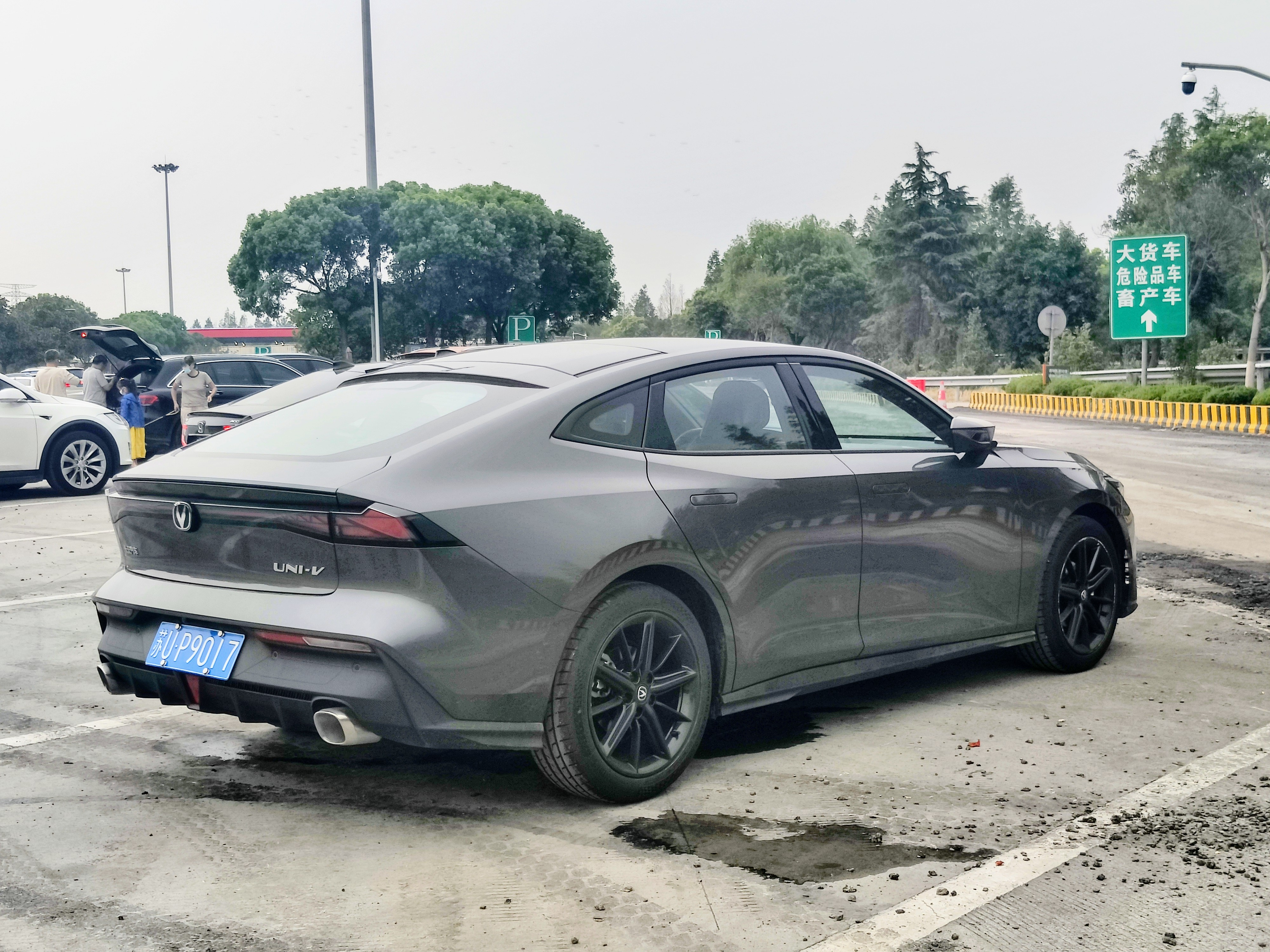
Rear view

The Changan UNI-V is the third product of the UNI-series, and also the first fastback of the series. It was first unveiled to the public during the 2021 Guangzhou Auto Show.

The Changan UNI-V was developed on the new lightweight Modular Platform Architecture, also called as Ark Architecture. The platform is the base of the highly rigid and lightweight body of the UNI-V according to Changan Automobile. The Ark architecture also offers six airbags and the white body chassis is 70% high-strength steel.

== Powertrain ==
The Changan UNI-V is powered by a 1.5 liter turbo engine developed by Changan Automobile inhouse with a maximum power of 138 kW (185 hp; 188 PS) and a maximum speed of 205 km/h (127 mph).

== Interior ==
The interior design of the UNI-V adopts a 3+1 quadruple screen layout design. The hovering instrument panel is placed above the steering wheel, displaying high-frequency interactive information such as speed and navigation from the instrument panel with a 10° eye movement when looking at the road ahead.

== Changan UNI-V iDD ==
The Changan UNI-V iDD launched in April 2024 is the plug-in hybrid version of the Changan UNI-V sedan featuring an upgraded powertrain and redesigned bumpers. The UNI-V iDD was originally planned to be a rebadged model sold under the Changan Nevo brand, called the A06. Images of the A06 were published, but plans were changed before launch and was sold as a variant of the UNI-V instead. The iDD plug-in hybrid system powertrain of the UNI-V iDD is composed of a 1.5 liter engine and a front positioned electric motor, mated to an E-CVT gearbox. The 1.5 liter engine has a maximum power output of 81 kW and a peak 143 Nm while the front positioned electric motor develops 158 kW and 330 Nm. The top speed of the UNI-V iDD is 185 km/h and the 0 to 100 km/h acceleration time is 6.9 seconds. The battery is a 18.99kWh or 18.4kWh lithium iron phosphate providing a CLTC pure electric range of 136 km while the combined CLTC range is 1,160 km. Charge the battery from 30% to 80% takes 30 minutes under DC fast charging.

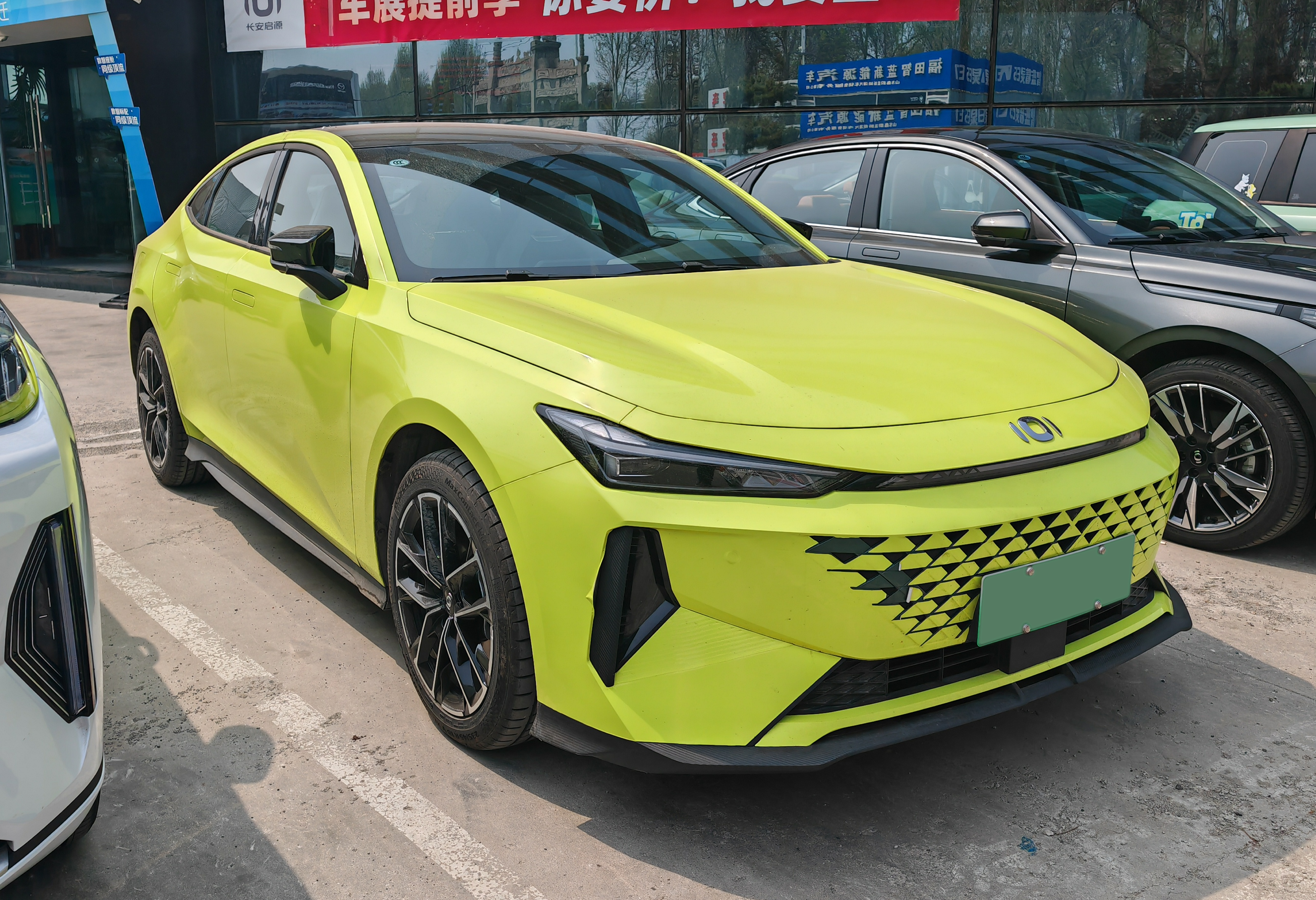
Changan Nevo A06 (cancelled)

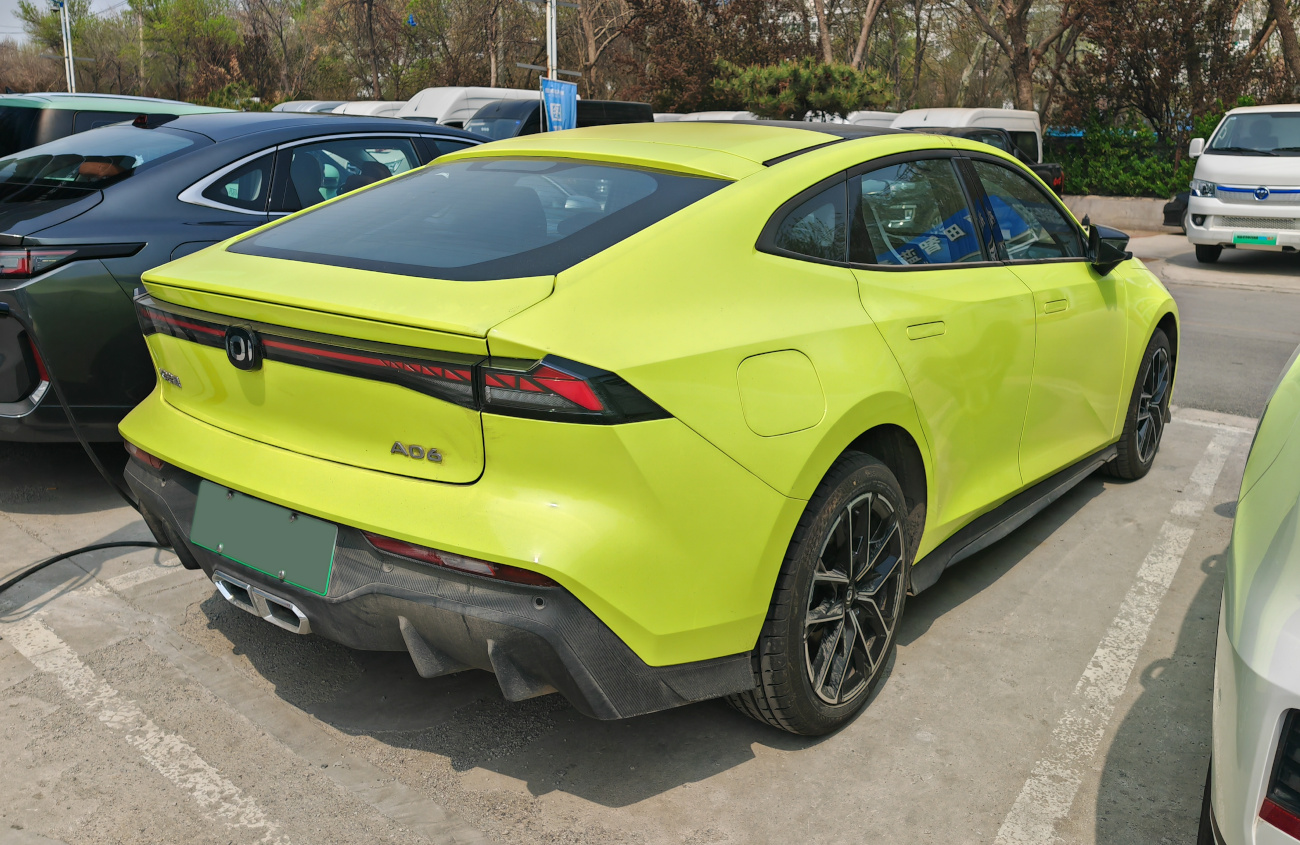
Rear view

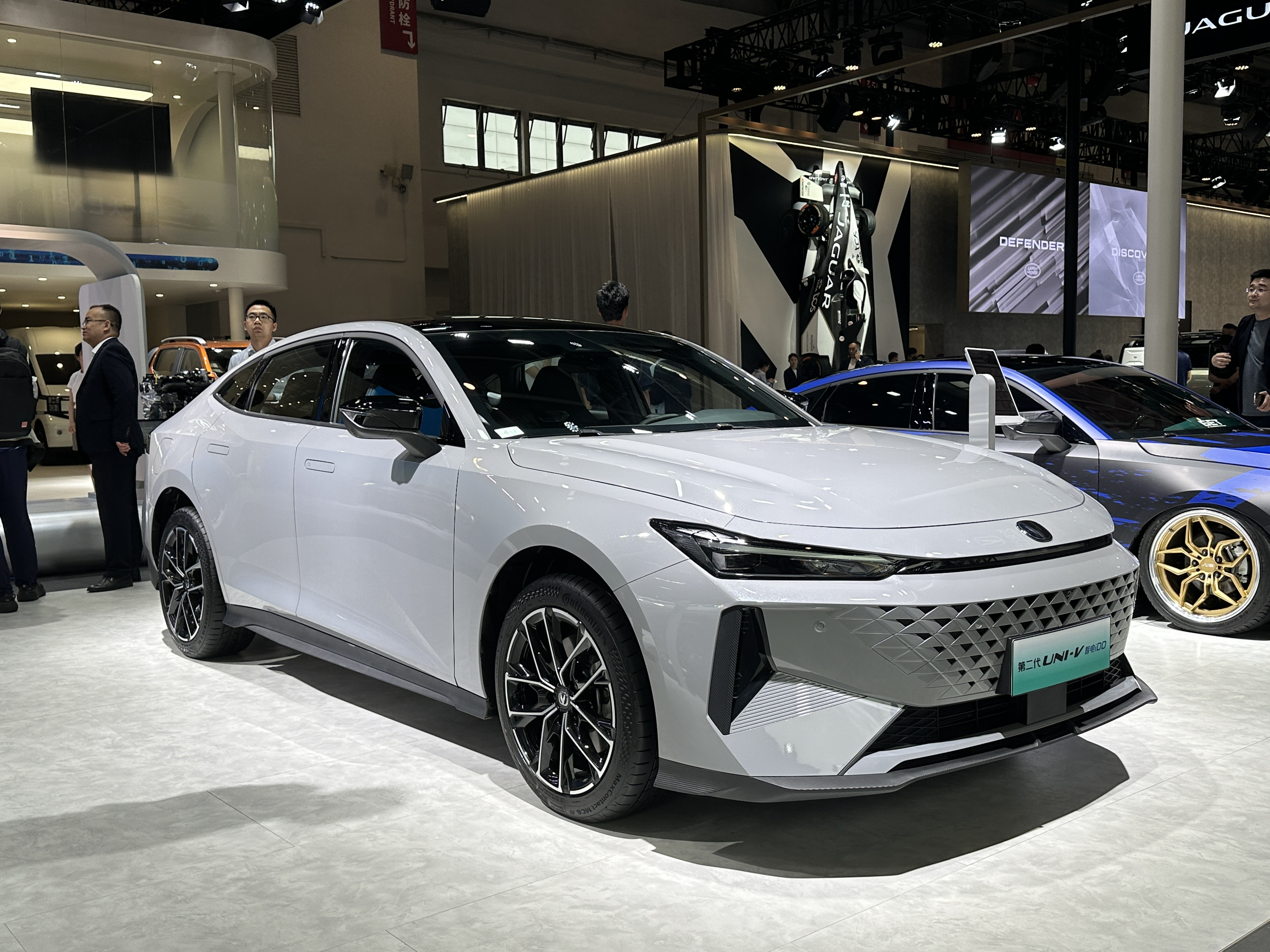
Changan UNI-V iDD

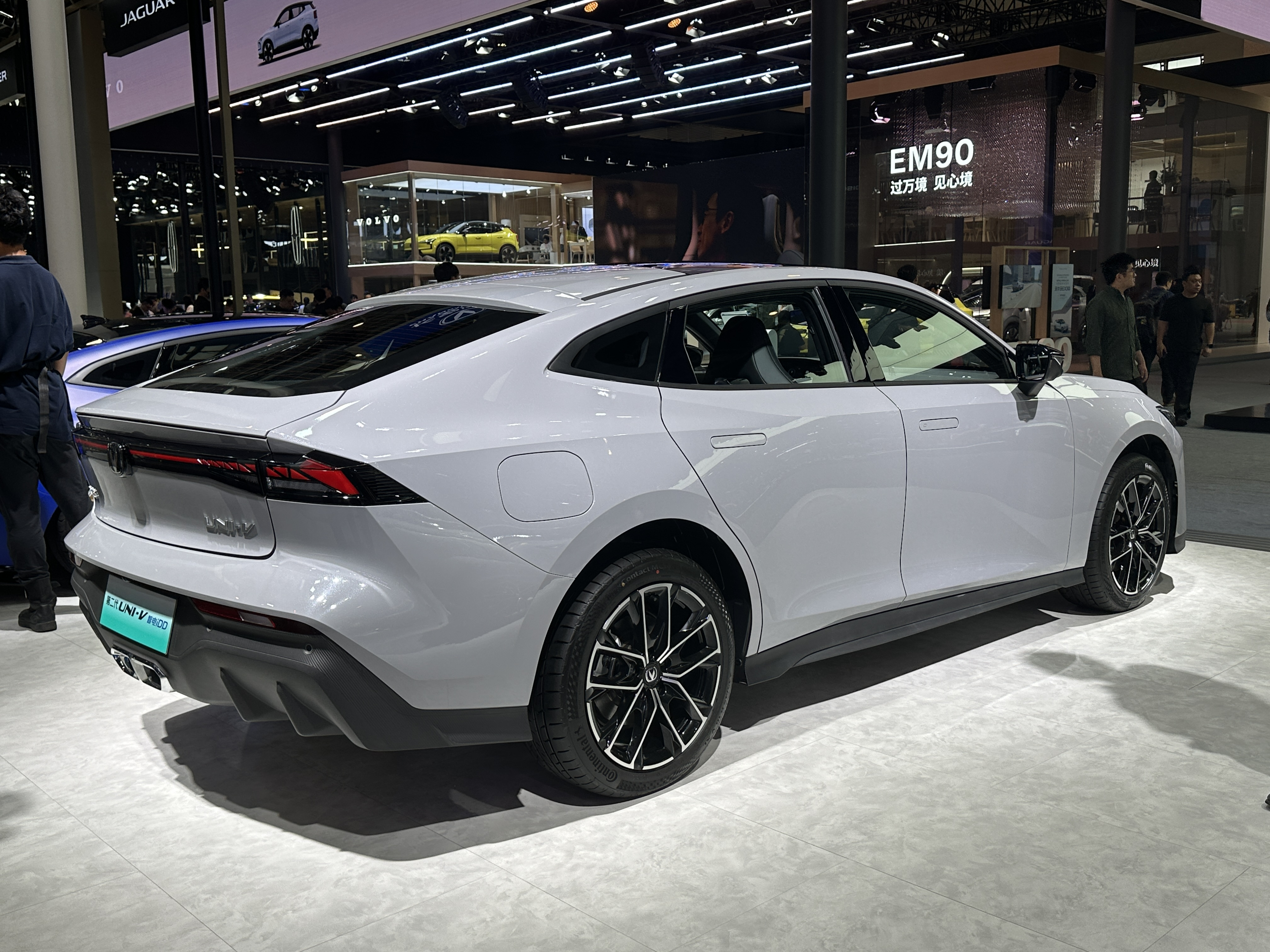
Rear view

== facelift (marketed as third generation) ==
A facelift was introduced in July 2025; renamed UNI-V third Generation (第三代UNI-V).

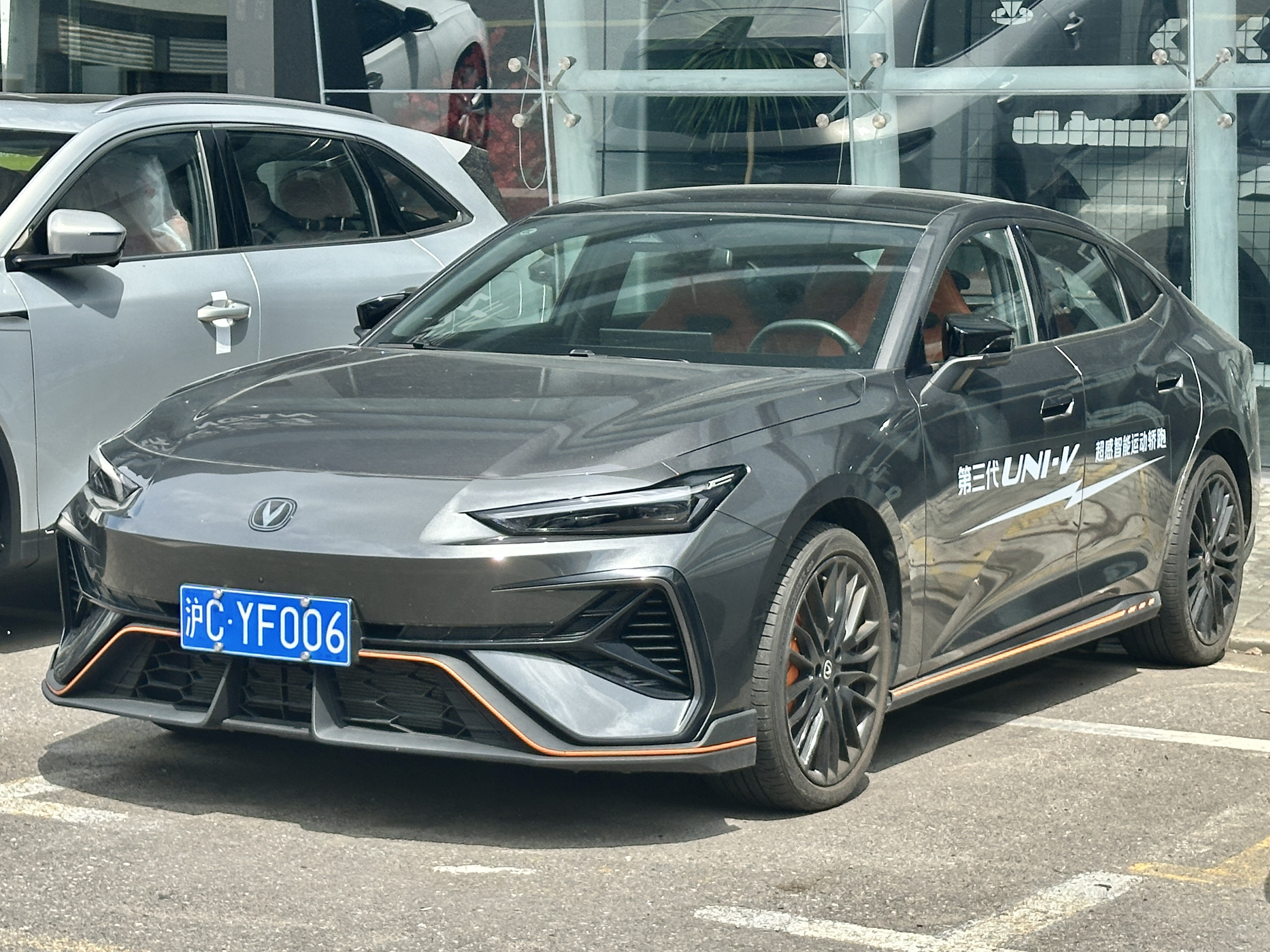
Changan UNI-V 2025 facelift

== Sales ==
Year	China			Total production
Year	UNI-V	iDD	Total	Total production
2022				108,845
2023	120,844	21,921	142,765	156,741
2024	79,246	6,064	85,310	107,447
2025	51,462	3,241	54,703	57,045
