= Changan CS85 =

Chinese mid-size crossover SUV

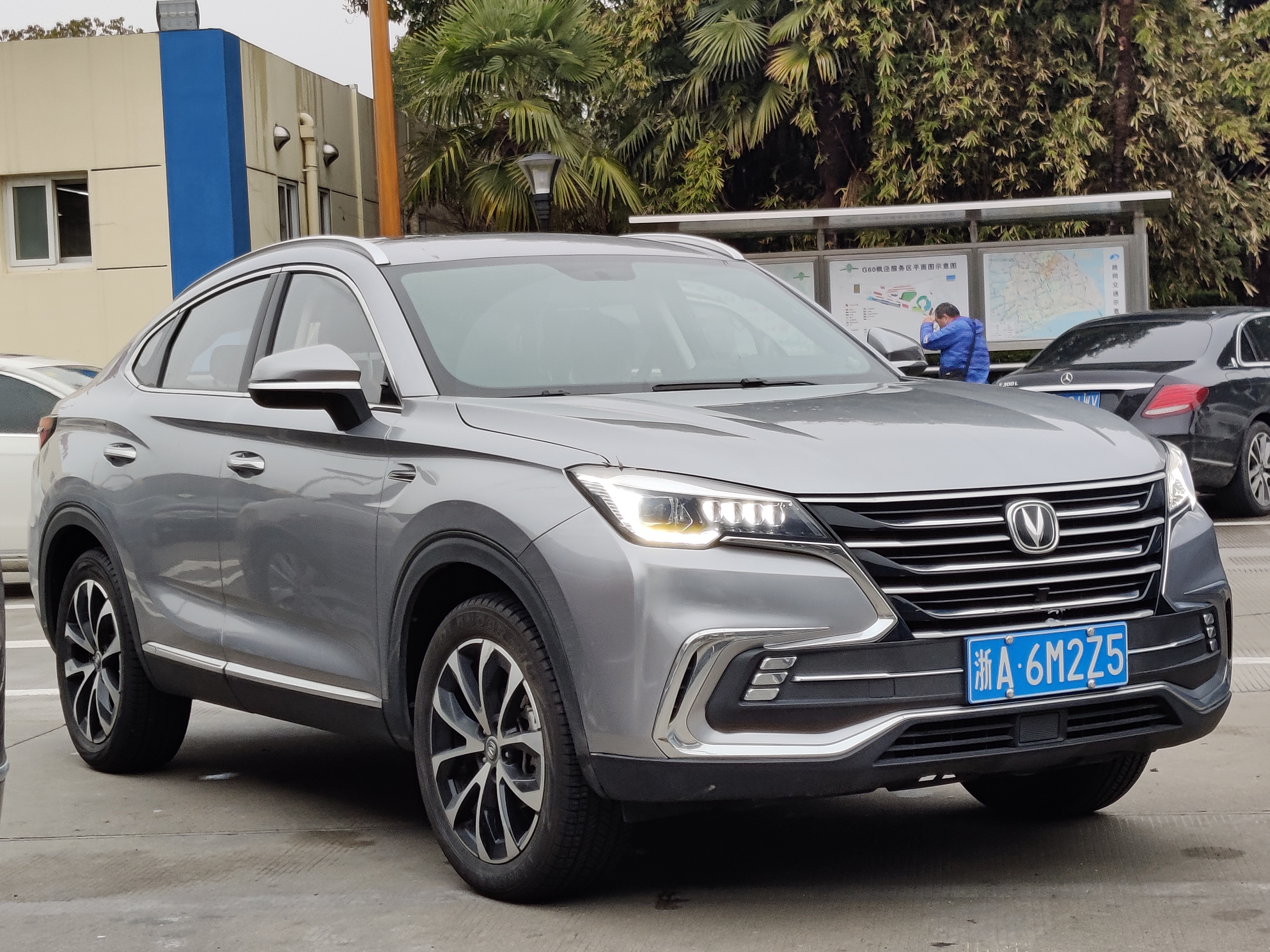

Overview
- Manufacturer: Changan Automobile
- Production: 2019–2025
- Assembly: China: Beijing

Body and chassis
- Class: mid-size SUV
- Body style: 5-door wagon
- Layout: FF layout

Powertrain
- Engine: 1.5 L JL476ZQCA I4 (turbo petrol); 2.0 L JL486ZQ3 I4 (turbo petrol)
- Transmission: 7-speed DCT; 8-speed automatic

Dimensions
- Wheelbase: 2,705 mm (106.5 in)
- Length: 4,720 mm (185.8 in)
- Width: 1,845 mm (72.6 in)
- Height: 1,665 mm (65.6 in)
- Curb weight: 1,685–1,730 kg (3,715–3,814 lb)

The Changan CS85 Coupe is a fastback mid-size SUV produced by Changan Automobile.

== Overview ==
The Changan CS85 Coupe was revealed during the 2019 Guangzhou Auto Show and was launched in China right after in March 2019.

The Changan CS85 Coupe is the Changan's first coupe SUV.

The CS85 mid-size CUV sits right below the CS95 mid-size CUV, the largest passenger car under the Changan product range, with the price range of the Changan CS85 ranging from 136,900 yuan to 169,900 yuan.

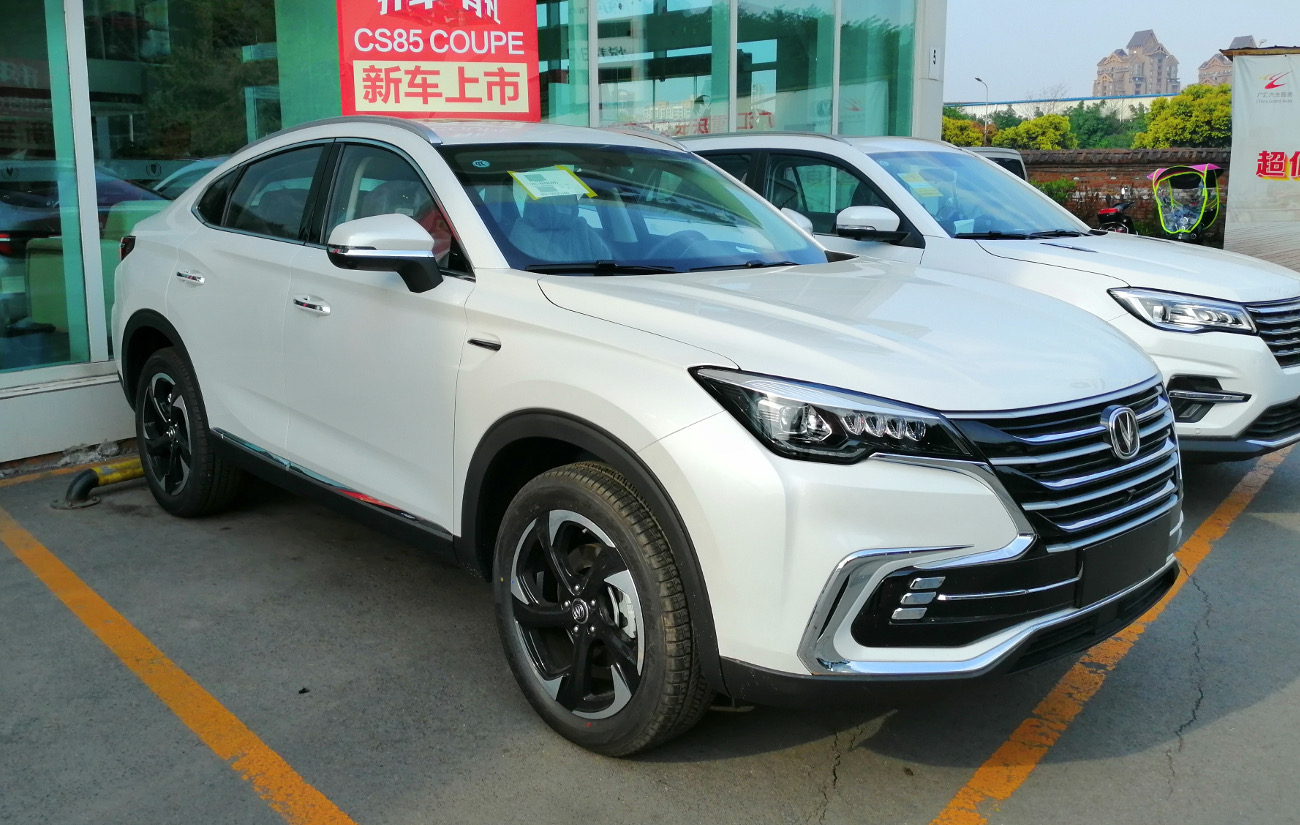
Chang'an CS85 Coupe (front)

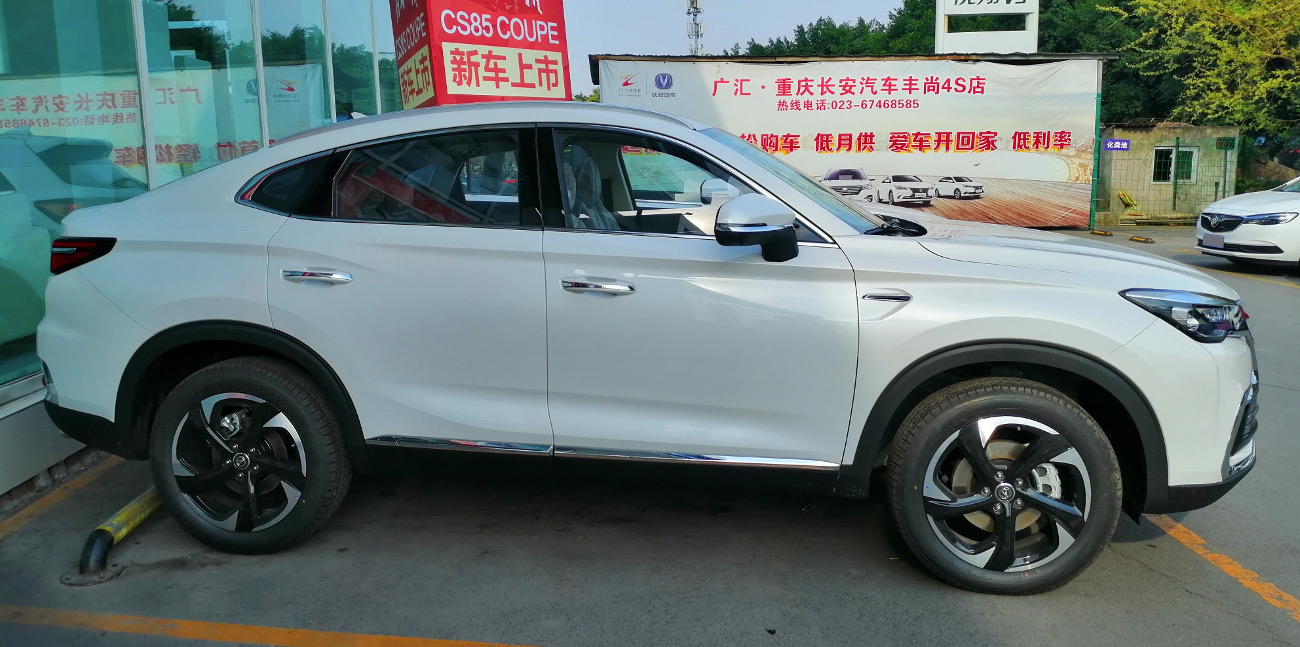
Chang'an CS85 Coupe (side)

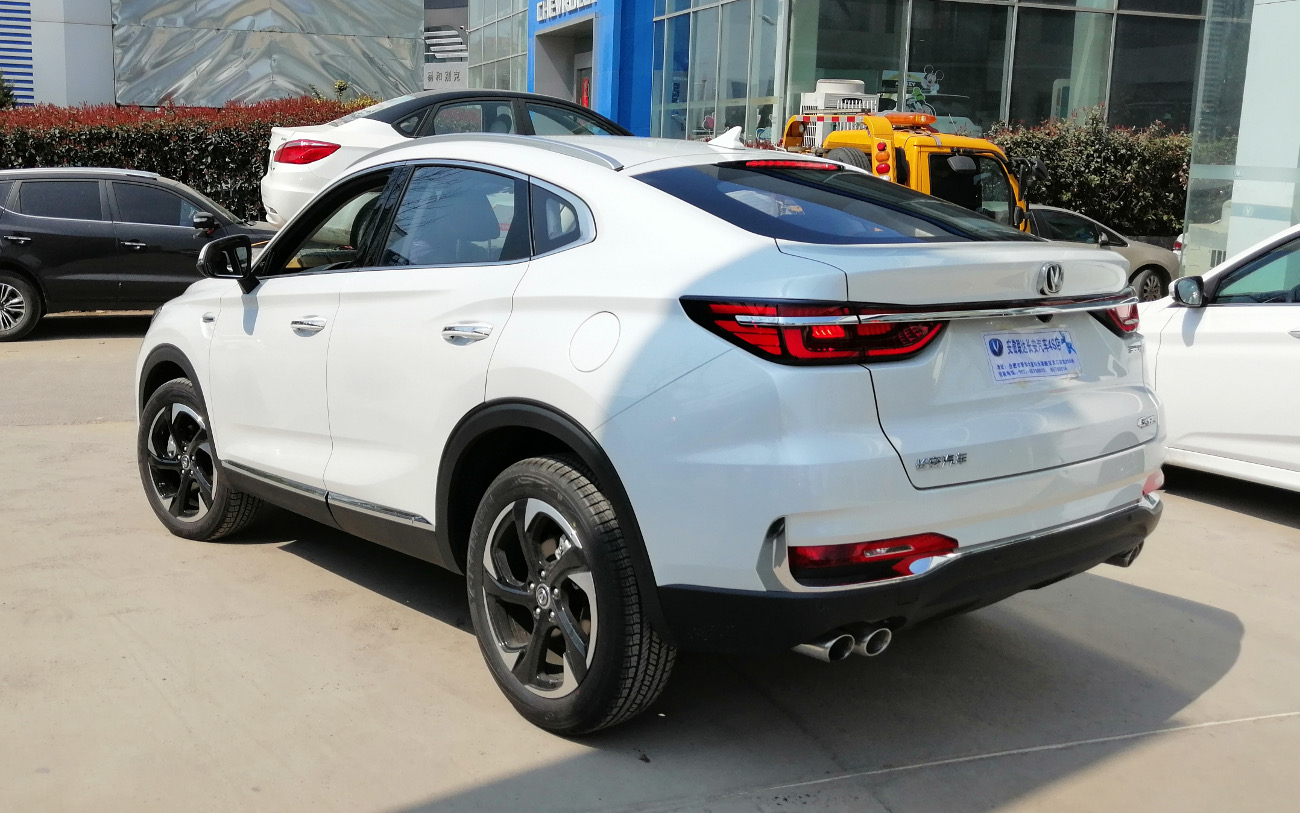
Chang'an CS85 Coupe (rear)

=== Specifications ===
The CS85 is available in a five-seater variant, and is powered by a 2.0-litre turbo with 233 hp (174 kW; 236 PS) and 360 N⋅m (266 lb⋅ft; 37 kg⋅m) of torque. A 1.5-litre turbo engine was added later. There is two options for the gearbox a 7-speed DCT or 8-speed automatic.
