= Aisin =

Japanese automotive component manufacturer

Aisin Corporation

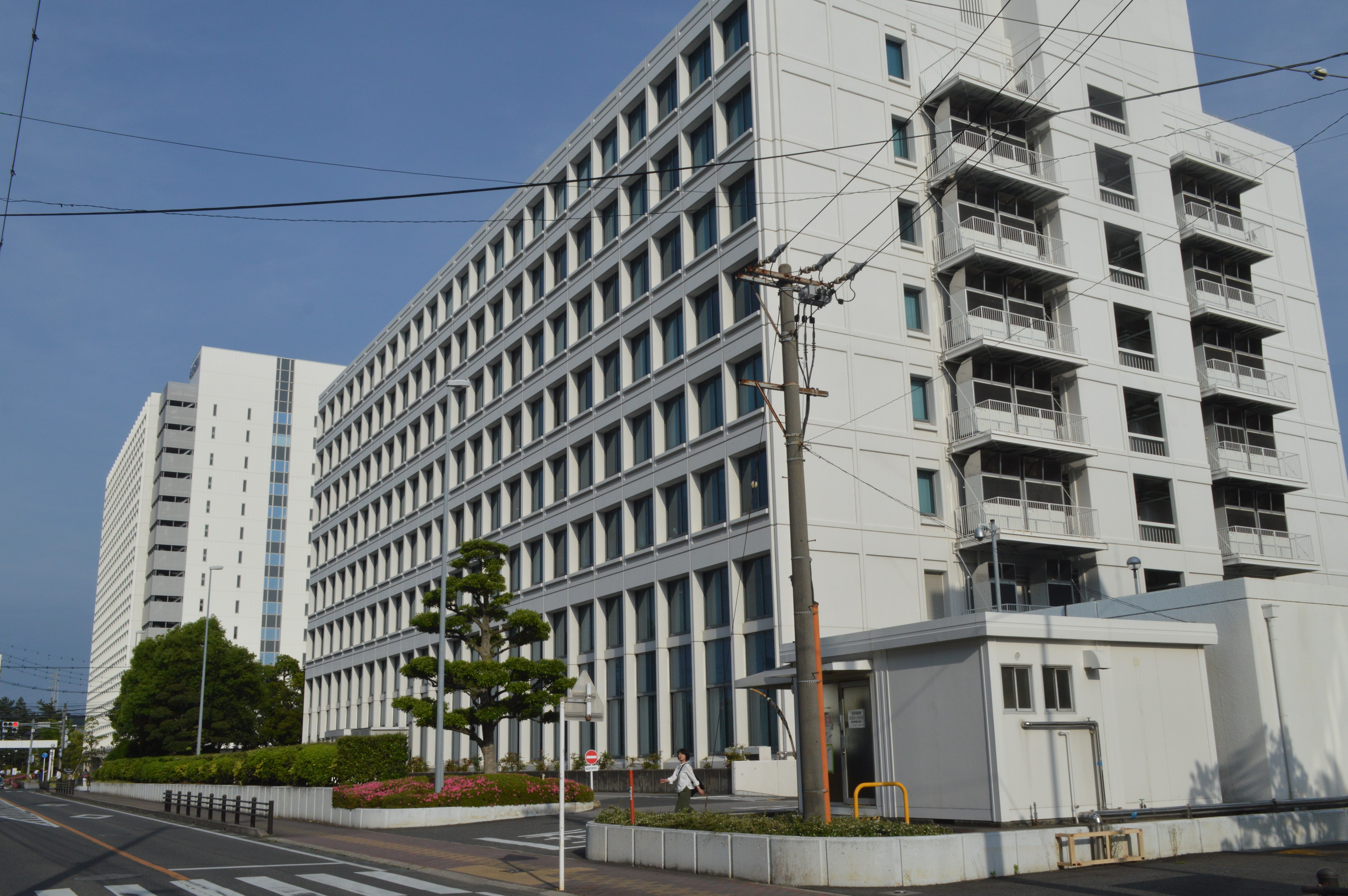
- Aisin headquarters in Kariya, Aichi, Japan
- Native name: 株式会社アイシン
- Romanized name: Kabushiki gaisha Aishin
- Type: Public K.K.
- Traded as: TYO: 7259; NAG: 7259
- Industry: Automotive
- Founded: 1949; 77 years ago (as Aichi Industries)
- Founder: Kiichiro Toyoda
- Headquarters: Kariya, Aichi, Japan
- Key people: Moritaka Yoshida (Chairman, President & CEO)
- Products: Automotive parts
- Revenue: ▲¥3.917 Trillion (Fiscal Year Ended March 31, 2022)
- Operating income: ▲¥182.011 Billion (Fiscal Year Ended March 31, 2022)
- Net income: ▲¥157.011 Billion (Fiscal Year Ended March 31, 2022)
- Total assets: ▲¥4.205 Trillion (Fiscal Year Ended March 31, 2022)
- Total equity: ▲¥1.996 Trillion (Fiscal Year Ended March 31, 2022)
- Owners: Toyota Motor Corporation (24.8%); Toyota Industries (7.68%); The Master Trust Bank of Japan (4.87%)
- Number of employees: 117,177 (as of March. 31, 2022)
- Website: aisin.com/en

Aisin Corporation (株式会社アイシン, Kabushiki gaisha Aishin) is a Japanese corporation that develops and produces components and systems for the automotive industry. Aisin is a Fortune Global 500 company, ranked 359 on the 2020 rankings. Aisin is a member of the Toyota Group of companies.

Aisin was founded in 1965 and supplies engine, drivetrain, body and chassis, aftermarket, and other automotive parts for the Toyota Motor Corporation and other major OEMs.

In addition to automotive products, Aisin also offers life and amenity products (such as sewing machines and, from 1966 to 2020, mattresses), cogeneration and heat exchange systems, and welfare products, among others.

== History ==
The company traces its origins to 1943, when Tokai Aviation Industries (東海航空工業, Tōkai Kōkū Kōgyō) was founded as a joint venture between the Toyota Motor Corporation and Kawasaki Aircraft Industries to produce aircraft engines for the Imperial Japanese Army Air Service. The company was quickly renamed Tokai Airplane Industries (東海飛行機工業, Tōkai Hikōki Kōgyō) after it was discovered that there was a pre-existing company with the same name.

After the war, Tokai renamed itself Aichi Industries (愛知工業, Aichi Kōgyō), and shifted production from aircraft parts to sewing machines and automobile parts. In 1965, Aichi Kogyo merged with auto parts manufacturer Shinkawa Kogyo 新川産業 to form Aisin Seiki Co., Ltd. (アイシン精機株式会社, Aishin Seiki Kabushiki gaisha).

In October 2019, Aisin Seiki announced that it would merge with subsidiary Aisin AW, consolidating management and renaming the company. Effective April 1, 2021, the combined company was officially renamed Aisin Corporation.

== Subsidiaries ==
=== Aisin AW ===
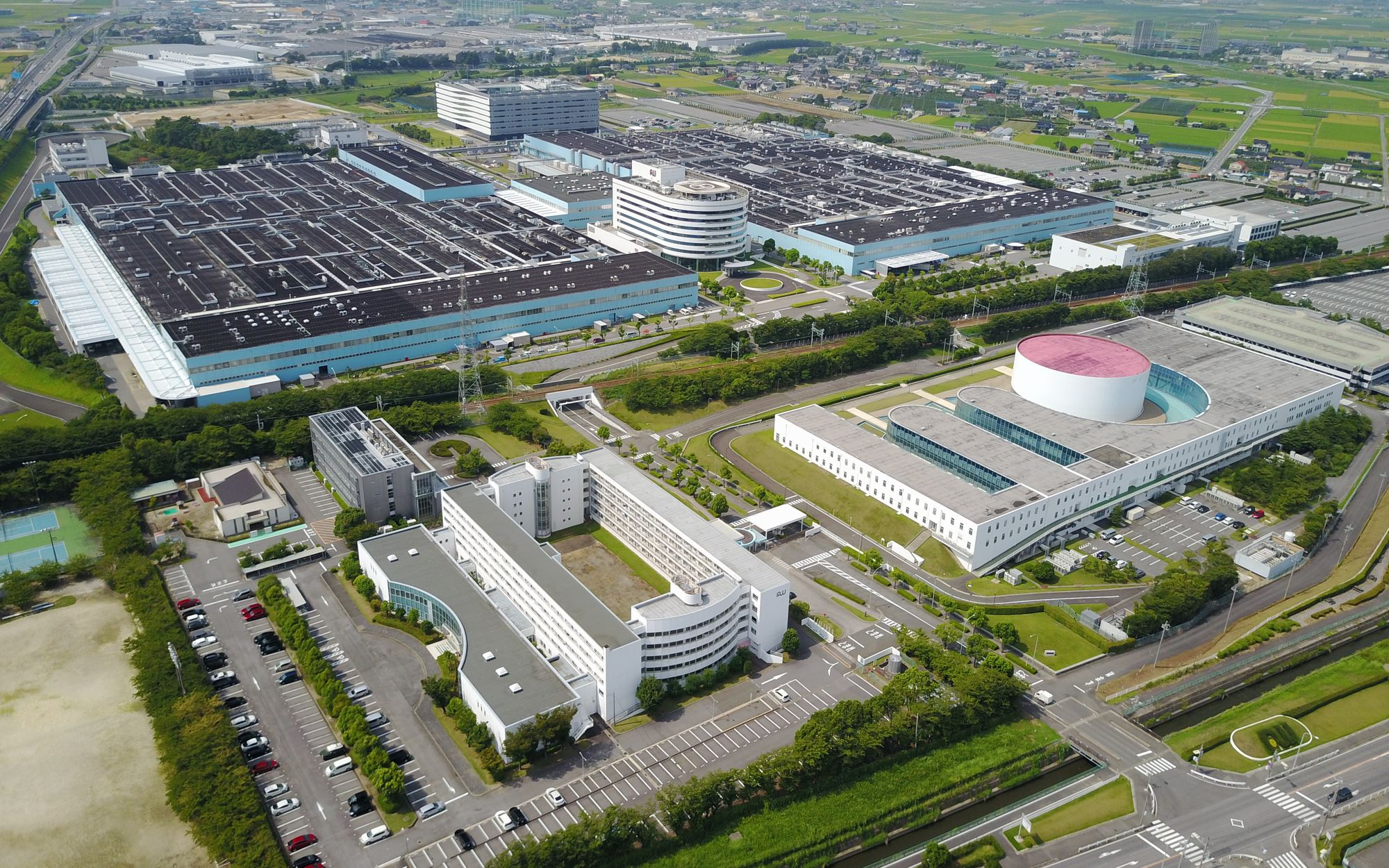
The headquarters of Aisin AW

Aisin AW was Aisin Seiki's subsidiary building automatic transmissions. It was originally established in 1969 as Aisin-Warner, a joint venture with BorgWarner. In 1981, BorgWarner reduced its equity in Aisin-Warner to 10%, and by 1987 had divested themselves of the remainder. Aisin-Warner was renamed Aisin AW in 1988, and merged with parent company Aisin Seiki in 2021.

Aisin AW developed the Toyota Prius transmission and the world's first speaking navigation system. Additionally, its two-axis electric continuously variable transmission has been adapted to Prius models (except the Prius C) from 2016 onward, the 1st-generation (2005–2007) and 2nd-generation (2008–2012) Ford Escape Hybrid, and the Chrysler Pacifica Hybrid from 2017 onward. The two-axis design eliminates the second planetary gearset used in the 2010–2015 Prius and Prius c, which reduces the width and weight of the eCVT and improves its overall efficiency.

Aisin AW was based in Anjō, with another major division located in Okazaki. Two European divisions, AW Europe & AW Technical Center Europe, were located in Braine-l'Alleud (for research and development) and Baudour (for the remanufacturing of automatic transmissions and transaxles, and the production of electronic components).

=== Aisin AI ===
Aisin AI was an Aisin Seiki subsidiary spun off in July 1991 to produce manual transmissions and transfer cases, moving its headquarters to Nishio. Until 1996, Aisin AI only client was Toyota; then DaimlerChrysler and Isuzu began using its products. The company later began supplying products to other companies worldwide.

Aisin AI was consolidated into Aisin AW in 2019.

=== Aisin USA ===
Aisin constructed a factory in the United States in 1986, with production beginning in 1989. This factory in Seymour, Indiana has since been expanded and supplies components for Honda, General Motors, Mitsubishi, Nissan, and Toyota. Another factory was built in Marion, Illinois. On October 5, 2005, Aisin USA opened an 878-acre (3.55 km^{2}) testing facility near Fowlerville, Michigan. The facility, which is Aisin's first in North America and third worldwide, is officially named FT Techno of America (FTTA), but is also known as the Fowlerville Proving Ground. FTTA is Aisin's fifth group company in Michigan.

In 2009, the North American division and its companies were placed under a newly created entity named Aisin World Corporation of America, which was structured so that Toyota, Mitsui, and the American branch of Hino have majority ownership of Aisin's North American operations.

=== BluE Nexus ===
BluE Nexus is a joint venture company established by Aisin and Denso in April 2019 to build powertrain systems for electric vehicles. Both Aisin and Denso are members of the Toyota Group and the Toyota Motor Corporation has a 10% stake in the company. The main product from BluE Nexus is the e-Axle, which integrates an electric motor, gears and inverter. BluE Nexus will also market the hybrid drive systems produced by Aisin AW.

=== IMRA ===
IMRA (Institut Minoru de Recherche Avancée) is a research organization founded in 1986 in Sophia Antipolis, France. It has three entities based in Europe, US, and Japan, which have become the key power of Aisin group to conduct R&D and offer technological consulting. The American division, IMRA America, was founded in 1990 in Ann Arbor, Michigan. IMRA mainly conducts research on biomedical, battery and produces femtosecond lasers.

== Sponsorship ==
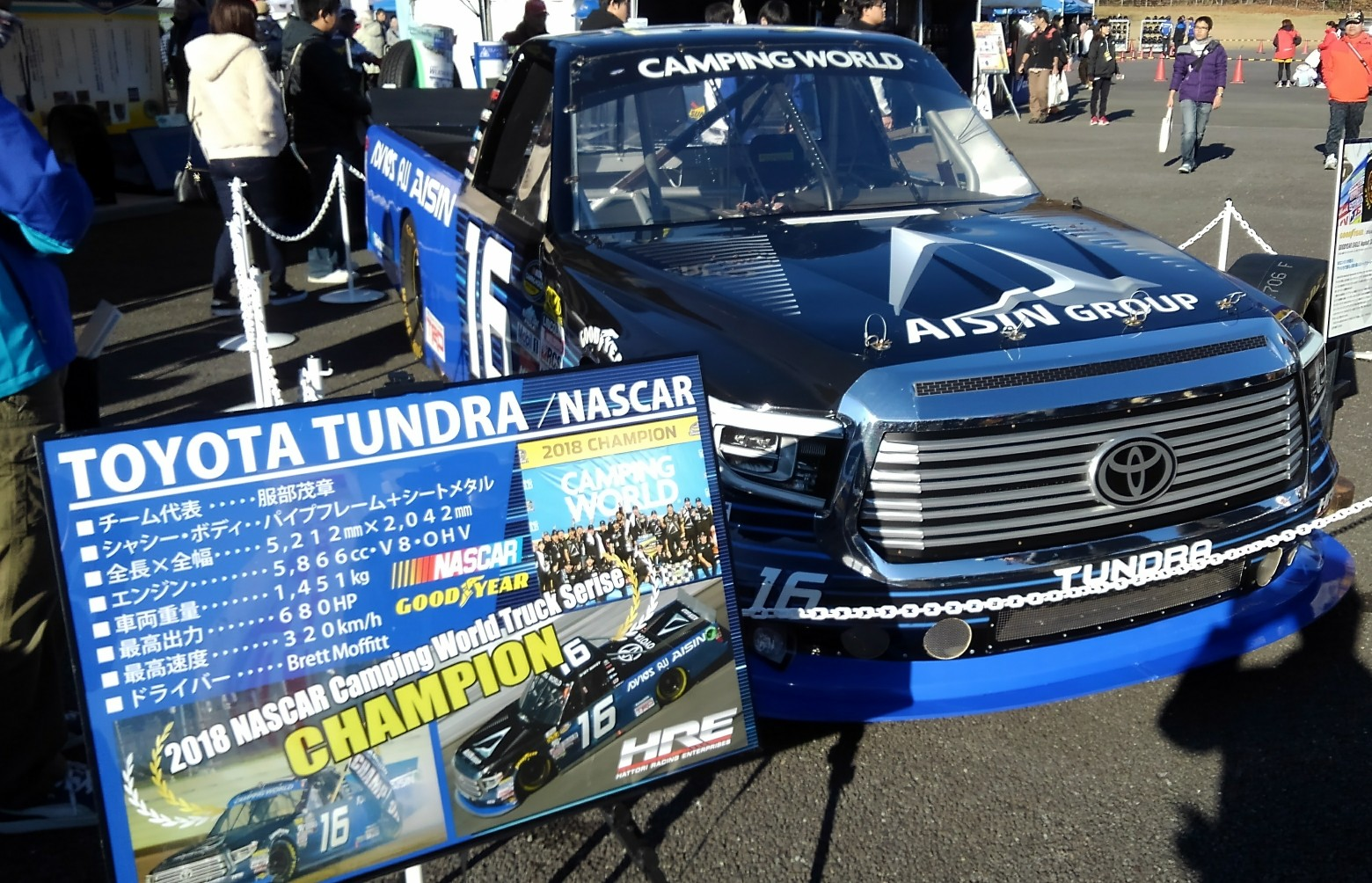
Brett Moffitt's championship-winning truck on display in Japan

The company sponsors the SeaHorses Mikawa, the 5-time champions of the JBL Super League, and has sponsored Toyota Gazoo Racing Europe since 2012.

=== NASCAR ===
Aisin AW previously sponsored Austin Hill in the NASCAR Camping World Truck Series and Xfinity Series. Hill drove the #61 Toyota Supra and #16 Toyota Tundra for Hattori Racing Enterprises. HRE's first win came at Atlanta Motor Speedway with Brett Moffitt, whose truck was also sponsored by Aisin, in 2018. HRE and Moffitt also won the CWTS championship that same year. Aisin AW also sponsored the team in the ARCA Menards Series.

== See also ==
- List of Aisin transmissions
- Toyota Group
- 1997 Aisin fire
