= Lepelletier planetary gearset =

World's first 7-speed epicyclic gearset from 1992

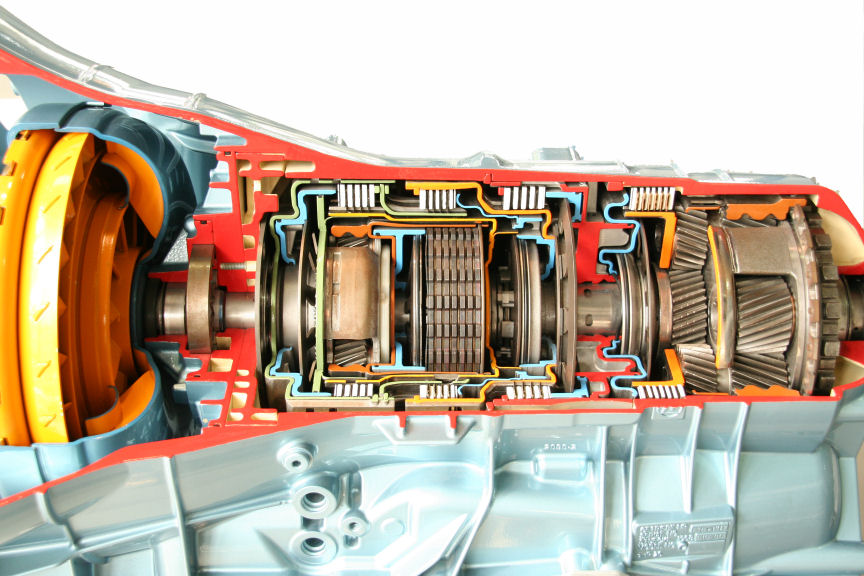
Cutaway of the ZF 6HP 26 from 2000, the world's first transmission to use the Lepelletier planetary gearset concept

The Lepelletier planetary gearset or Lepelletier gear mechanisms is an epicyclic gear system combined of a planetary gearset and a compound Ravigneaux gearset with seven forward gears, six of which are usable. It has three degrees of freedom and is based on a concept by Pierre A. G. Lepelletier from 1992.

== History ==
The combination of serial and parallel power flow offers additional gear ratios without increasing the complexity of the design. This transmission is the first of its kind to take advantage of this benefit.

Due to these advantages, this gearset concept became widely used in automatic vehicle transmissions. ZF was the first to start series production in 2000. Aisin/Toyota, Ford, and GM followed in 2005. For the first time, the construction costs could be reduced compared to the respective predecessor models.

== Planetary gearset concept ==
=== Improved fuel economy ===
The main objective in replacing the predecessor model was to improve vehicle fuel economy with extra speeds and a wider gear span to allow the engine speed level to be lowered (downspeeding), which is a decisive factor in improving energy efficiency and thus reducing fuel consumption. In addition, the lower engine speed level improves the noise-vibration-harshness comfort and the exterior noise is reduced.

It has a torque converter lock-up for all 6 forward gears, which can be fully disengaged when stationary, largely closing the fuel efficiency gap between vehicles with automatic and manual transmissions.

=== Reduced manufacturing complexity ===
In order to avoid a further increase in manufacturing complexity while expanding the number of gear ratios, all major manufacturers switched from the conventional design method—in which the planetary gearset concept was limited to a purely serial or in-line power flow—to a more modern design method that utilizes a planetary gearset concept with combined parallel and serial power flow. This was only possible thanks to computer-aided design and has resulted in a globally patented gearset concept. The resulting progress is reflected in a better ratio of the number of gears to the number of components used compared to existing layouts.

Planetary gearset concept: manufacturing complexity (Note: Progress increases cost-effectiveness and is reflected in the ratio of forward gears to main components. It depends on the power flow: parallel: using the two degrees of freedom of planetary gearsets; to increase the number of gears; with unchanged number of components; serial: in-line combined planetary gearsets without using the two degrees of freedom; to increase the number of gears; a corresponding increase in the number of components is unavoidable)
With Assessment	Output: Gear Ratios	Innovation Elasticity (Note: Innovation elasticity classifies progress and market position: Automobile manufacturers drive forward technical developments primarily in order to remain competitive or to achieve or defend technological leadership. This technical progress has therefore always been subject to economic constraints; Only innovations whose relative additional benefit is greater than the relative additional resource input, i.e. whose economic elasticity is greater than 1, are considered for realization; The required innovation elasticity of an automobile manufacturer depends on its expected return on investment. The basic assumption that the relative additional benefit must be at least twice as high as the relative additional resource input helps with orientation; negative, if the output increases and the input decreases, is perfect; 2 or above is good; 1 or above is acceptable (red); below this is unsatisfactory (bold)) Δ Output : Δ Input	Input: Main Components			
With Assessment	Output: Gear Ratios	Innovation Elasticity Δ Output : Δ Input	Total	Gearsets	Brakes	Clutches
ZF 6HP Ref. Object	$n_{O1}$ $n_{O2}$	Topic	$n_I= n_G+$ $n_B+ n_C$	$n_{G1}$ $n_{G2}$	$n_{B1}$ $n_{B2}$	$n_{C1}$ $n_{C2}$
Δ Number	$n_{O1}- n_{O2}$	Topic	$n_{I1}- n_{I2}$	$n_{G1}- n_{G2}$	$n_{B1}- n_{B2}$	$n_{C1}- n_{C2}$
Relative Δ	Δ Output $\tfrac{n_{O1}- n_{O2}} {n_{O2}}$	$\tfrac{n_{O1}- n_{O2}} {n_{O2}}: \tfrac{n_{I1}- n_{I2}} {n_{I2}}$ $=\tfrac{n_{O1}- n_{O2}} {n_{O2}}$·$\tfrac{n_{I2}} {n_{I1}- n_{I2}}$	Δ Input $\tfrac{n_{I1}- n_{I2}} {n_{I2}}$	$\tfrac{n_{G1}- n_{G2}} {n_{G2}}$	$\tfrac{n_{B1}- n_{B2}} {n_{B2}}$	$\tfrac{n_{C1}- n_{C2}} {n_{C2}}$
ZF 6HP ZF 5HP 24/30 (Note: Direct predecessor: To reflect the progress of the specific model change)	6 (Note: plus 1 reverse gear); 5	Progress	8; 9	3 (Note: of which 2 gearsets are combined as a compound Ravigneaux gearset); 3	2; 3	3; 3
Δ Number	1	Progress	–1	0	–1	0
Relative Δ	0.200 $\tfrac{1} {5}$	−1.800 $\tfrac{1} {5}: \tfrac{-1} {9}= \tfrac{1} {5}$·$\tfrac{-9} {1}= \tfrac{-9} {5}$	−0.111 $\tfrac{-1} {9}$	0.000 $\tfrac{0} {3}$	−0.333 $\tfrac{-1} {3}$	0.000 $\tfrac{0} {3}$
ZF 6HP ZF 5HP 18/19	6; 5	Progress	8; 10	3; 3	2; 3	3; 4
Δ Number	1	Progress	–2	0	–1	–1
Relative Δ	0.200 $\tfrac{1} {5}$	−1.000 $\tfrac{1} {5}: \tfrac{-1} {5}= \tfrac{1} {5}$·$\tfrac{-5} {1}= \tfrac{-1} {1}$	−0.200 $\tfrac{-1} {5}$	0.000 $\tfrac{0} {3}$	−0.333 $\tfrac{-1} {3}$	−0.250 $\tfrac{-1} {4}$
ZF 6HP 3-Speed (Note: Reference standard (benchmark): 3-speed transmissions with torque converters have established the modern market for automatic transmissions and thus made it possible in the first place, as this design proved to be a particularly successful compromise between cost and performance; It became the archetype and dominated the world market for around 3 decades, setting the standard for automatic transmissions. It was only when fuel consumption became the focus of interest that this design reached its limits, which is why it has now completely disappeared from the market; What has remained is the orientation that it offers as a reference standard (point of reference, benchmark) for this market for determining progressiveness and thus the market position of all other, later designs; All transmission variants consist of 7 main components; Typical examples are; Turbo-Hydramatic from GM; Cruise-O-Matic from Ford; TorqueFlite from Chrysler; Detroit Gear from BorgWarner for Studebaker; BW-35 from BorgWarner and as T35 from Aisin; 3N 71 from Nissan/Jatco; 3 HP from ZF Friedrichshafen; W3A 040 and W3B 050 from Mercedes-Benz)	6; 3	Market Position	8; 7	3; 2	2; 3	3; 2
Δ Number	3	Market Position	1	1	–1	1
Relative Δ	1.000 $\tfrac{1} {1}$	7.000 $\tfrac{1} {1}: \tfrac{1} {7}= \tfrac{1} {1}$·$\tfrac{7} {1}= \tfrac{7} {1}$	0.143 $\tfrac{1} {7}$	0.500 $\tfrac{1} {2}$	−0.333 $\tfrac{-1} {3}$	0.500 $\tfrac{1} {2}$

=== No use of 5th (direct) gear from the original concept ===
The Lepelletier gearset concept actually provides 7 forward gears. However, the 5th gear, which is configured as a direct gear (ratio 1.00) in this configuration, requires a releaseable brake for S_{1} (sun gear of the first gearset, which is the simple one) and thus a 6th shifting element without any corresponding benefit: with ratios of approximately 1.15 and 0.85, the 4th and 6th gears are so close together that the 5th gear can easily be dispensed with. This means that all manufacturers can manage with 5 shifting elements and all transmissions built have 6 gear ratios instead of the possible 7.

=== Quality ===
The ratios of the 6 gears are nicely evenly distributed in all versions. Exceptions are the large step from 1st to 2nd gear and the almost geometric steps from 3rd to 4th to 5th gear. They cannot be eliminated without affecting all other gears. As the large step is shifted due to the large span to a lower speed range than with conventional gearboxes, it is less significant. As the gear steps are smaller overall due to the additional gear(s), the geometric gear steps are still smaller than the corresponding gear steps of conventional gearboxes. Overall, therefore, the weaknesses are not overly significant. As the selected gearset concept saves up to 2 components compared to 5-speed transmissions, the advantages clearly outweigh the disadvantages.

The layout brings the ability to shift in a non-sequential manner – going from gear 6 to gear 2 in extreme situations simply by changing one shift element (actuating clutch E and releasing brake A).

Planetary gearset concept: gear ratio quality (Note: The 6HP-transmission is the first one to use the Lepelletier gear mechanism) (Note: Revised 14 January 2026 Nomenclature: $S_n =$ sun gear: number of teeth; $R_n =$ ring gear: number of teeth; $\color{gray}{C_n = }$ carrier or planetary gear carrier (not needed); $s_n =$ sun gear: shaft speed; $r_n =$ ring gear: shaft speed; $c_n =$ carrier or planetary gear carrier: shaft speed; With $n =$ gear is: $i_n =$ gear ratio or transmission ratio; $\omega_{1;n} = \omega_t =$ shaft speed shaft 1: input (turbine) shaft; $\omega_{2;n} =$ shaft speed shaft 2: output shaft; $T_{1;n} = T_t =$ torque shaft 1: input (turbine) shaft; $T_{2;n} =$ torque shaft 2: output shaft; $\mu_n =$ torque ratio or torque conversion ratio; $\eta_n =$ efficiency; $i_0 =$ stationary gear ratio; $\eta_0 =$ (assumed) stationary gear efficiency)
In-Depth Analysis (Note: Gear ratio (transmission ratio) $i_n$ — speed conversion —: The gear ratio $i_n$ is the ratio of; input shaft speed $\omega_{1;n}$; to output shaft speed $\omega_{2;n}$; and therefore corresponds to the reciprocal of the shaft speeds; $i_n = \frac{1} {\frac{\omega_{2;n}} {\omega_{1;n}}} = \frac{\omega_{1;n}} {\omega_{2;n}} = \frac{\omega_t} {\omega_{2;n}}$) With Assessment And Torque Ratio (Note: Torque ratio (torque conversion ratio) $\mu_n$ — torque conversion —: The torque ratio $\mu_n$ is the ratio of; output torque $T_{2;n}$; to input torque $T_{1;n}$; minus efficiency losses; and therefore corresponds (apart from the efficiency losses) to the reciprocal of the shaft speeds too; $\mu_n = i_n \eta_{n;\eta_0} = \frac{\omega_{1;n} \eta_{n;\eta_0}} {\omega_{2;n}} = \frac{T_{2;n} \eta_{n;\eta_0}} {T_{1;n}}$; whereby $\eta_{n;\eta_0}$ may vary from gear to gear according to the formulas listed in this table and $0 \le \eta_{n;\eta_0} \le 1$) And Efficiency Calculation (Note: Efficiency: The efficiency $\eta_n$ is calculated; from the torque ratio; in relation to the gear ratio (transmission ratio); $\eta_n = \frac{\mu_n} {i_n}$; Power loss for single meshing gears; is in the range of 1 % to 1.5 %; helical gear pairs, which are used to reduce noise in passenger cars, are in the upper part of the loss range; spur gear pairs, which are limited to commercial vehicles due to their poorer noise comfort, are in the lower part of the loss range; Corridor for torque ratio and efficiency: in planetary gearsets, the stationary gear ratio $i_0$ is formed via the planetary gears and thus by two meshes; for reasons of simplification, the efficiency for both meshes together is commonly specified there; the efficiencies $\eta_0$ specified here are based on assumed efficiencies for the stationary ratio $i_0$; of $\eta_0 = 0.9800$ (upper value); and $\eta_0 = 0.9700$ (lower value); for both interventions together; The corresponding efficiency; for single-meshing gear pairs is ${\eta_0}^\tfrac {1}{2}$; at $0.9800^\tfrac{1} {2} = 0.98995$ (upper value); and $0.9700^\tfrac{1} {2} = 0.98489$ (lower value))		Planetary Gearset: Teeth (Note: Layout: Input and output are on opposite sides; Planetary gearset 1 is on the input (turbine) side; Input (turbine) shafts are R_{1} and, if actuated, C_{2}/C_{3} (the common carrier of the compound Ravigneaux gearset); Output shaft is R_{3} (ring gear of outer Ravigneaux gearset)) Lepelletier Gear Mechanism			Count	Nomi- nal (Note: Total ratio span (total gear ratio/total transmission ratio) nominal: $\frac{\omega_{2;n}} {\omega_{2;1}} = \frac{\frac{\omega_{2;n}} {\omega_{2;1} \omega_{2;n}}} {\frac{\omega_{2;1}} {\omega_{2;1} \omega_{2;n}}} = \frac{\frac{1} {\omega_{2;1}}} {\frac{1} {\omega_{2;n}}} = \frac{\frac{\omega_t} {\omega_{2;1}}} {\frac{\omega_t} {\omega_{2;n}}} = \frac{i_1} {i_n}$; A wider span enables the; downspeeding when driving outside the city limits; increase the climbing ability; when driving over mountain passes or off-road; or when towing a trailer) Effec- tive (Note: Total ratio span (total gear ratio/total transmission ratio) effective: $\frac{\omega_{2;n}} {max(\omega_{2;1};|\omega_{2;R}|)} = \frac{min(i_1;|i_R|)} {i_n}$; The span is only effective to the extent that; the reverse gear ratio; matches that of 1st gear; see also Standard R:1; Digression Reverse gear: is usually longer than 1st gear; the effective span is therefore of central importance for describing the suitability of a transmission; because in these cases, the nominal spread conveys a misleading picture; which is only unproblematic for vehicles with high specific power; Market participants: Manufacturers naturally have no interest in specifying the effective span; Users have not yet formulated the practical benefits that the effective span has for them; The effective span has not yet played a role in research and teaching; Contrary to its significance: the effective span has therefore not yet been able to establish itself; either in theory; or in practice.; End of digression)	Cen- ter (Note: Ratio span's center: $(i_1 i_n)^\frac{1} {2}$; The center indicates the speed level of the transmission; Together with the final drive ratio; it gives the shaft speed level of the vehicle)
In-Depth Analysis With Assessment And Torque Ratio And Efficiency Calculation		Simple	Ravigneaux		Count	Nomi- nal Effec- tive	Avg. (Note: Average gear step: $\left( \frac{\omega_{2;n}} {\omega_{2;1}} \right) ^\frac{1} {n-1} = \left( \frac{i_1} {i_n} \right) ^\frac{1} {n-1}$; There are $n-1$ gear steps between $n$ gears; with decreasing step width; the gears connect better to each other; shifting comfort increases)
Make (Note: Make $=$ manufacturer) Model	Version First Delivery	S_{1} (Note: Sun 1: sun gear of gearset 1) R_{1} (Note: Ring 1: ring gear of gearset 1)	S_{2} (Note: Sun 2: sun gear of gearset 2: inner Ravigneaux gearset) R_{2} (Note: Ring 2: ring gear of gearset 2: inner Ravigneaux gearset)	S_{3} (Note: Sun 3: sun gear of gearset 3: outer Ravigneaux gearset) R_{3} (Note: Ring 3: ring gear of gearset 3: outer Ravigneaux gearset)	Brakes Clutches	Ratio Span	Gear Step (Note: Standard 50:50 — 50 % is above and 50 % is below the average gear step —: With steadily decreasing gear steps (yellow highlighted line Step); and a particularly large step from 1st to 2nd gear; the lower half of the gear steps (between the small gears; rounded down, here the first 2) is always larger; and the upper half of the gear steps (between the large gears; rounded up, here the last 3) is always smaller; than the average gear step (cell highlighted yellow two rows above on the far right); lower half: smaller gear steps are a waste of possible ratios (red bold); upper half: larger gear steps are unsatisfactory (red bold))
Gear	R	1	2	3	4	5	6
Gear Ratio	${i_R}$	${i_1}$	${i_2}$	${i_3}$	${i_4}$	${i_5}$	${i_6}$
Step	$-\frac{i_R} {i_1}$ (Note: Standard R:1 — reverse and 1st gear have the same ratio —: The ideal reverse gear has the same transmission ratio as 1st gear; no impairment when maneuvering; especially when towing a trailer; a torque converter can only partially compensate for this deficiency; Plus 11.11 % minus 10 % compared to 1st gear is good; Plus 25 % minus 20 % is acceptable (red); Above this is unsatisfactory (bold); see also Total ratio span (total gear ratio/total transmission ratio) effective)	$\frac{i_1} {i_1}$	$\frac{i_1} {i_2}$ (Note: Standard 1:2 — gear step 1st to 2nd gear as small as possible —: With continuously decreasing gear steps (yellow marked line Step); the largest gear step is the one from 1st to 2nd gear, which; for a good speed connection and; a smooth gear shift; must be as small as possible; A gear ratio of up to 1.6667 : 1 (5 : 3) is good; Up to 1.7500 : 1 (7 : 4) is acceptable (red); Above is unsatisfactory (bold))	$\frac{i_2} {i_3}$	$\frac{i_3} {i_4}$	$\frac{i_4} {i_5}$	$\frac{i_5} {i_6}$
Δ Step (Note: Δ Step: from large to small gears (from right to left)) (Note: Standard STEP — from large to small gears: steady and progressive increase in gear steps —: Gear steps should; increase: Δ Step (first green highlighted line Δ Step) is always greater than 1; As progressive as possible: Δ Step is always greater than the previous step; Not progressively increasing is acceptable (red); Not increasing is unsatisfactory (bold))			$\tfrac{i_1} {i_2} : \tfrac{i_2} {i_3}$	$\tfrac{i_2} {i_3} : \tfrac{i_3} {i_4}$	$\tfrac{i_3} {i_4} : \tfrac{i_4} {i_5}$	$\tfrac{i_4} {i_5} : \tfrac{i_5} {i_6}$	
Shaft Speed	$\frac{i_1} {i_R}$	$\frac{i_1} {i_1}$	$\frac{i_1} {i_2}$	$\frac{i_1} {i_3}$	$\frac{i_1} {i_4}$	$\frac{i_1} {i_5}$	$\frac{i_1} {i_6}$
Δ Shaft Speed (Note: Standard SPEED — from small to large gears: steady increase in shaft speed difference —: Shaft speed differences should; increase: Δ shaft speed (second line marked in green Δ (shaft) speed) is always greater than the previous one; 1 difference smaller than the previous one is acceptable (red); 2 consecutive ones are a waste of possible ratios (bold))	$0 - \tfrac{i_1} {i_R}$	$\tfrac{i_1} {i_1} - 0$	$\tfrac{i_1} {i_2} - \tfrac{i_1} {i_1}$	$\tfrac{i_1} {i_3} - \tfrac{i_1} {i_2}$	$\tfrac{i_1} {i_4} - \tfrac{i_1} {i_3}$	$\tfrac{i_1} {i_5} - \tfrac{i_1} {i_4}$	$\tfrac{i_1} {i_6} - \tfrac{i_1} {i_5}$
Torque Ratio	$\mu_R$	$\mu_1$	$\mu_2$	$\mu_3$	$\mu_4$	$\mu_5$	$\mu_6$
Efficiency $\eta_n$	$\frac{\mu_R} {i_R}$	$\frac{\mu_1} {i_1}$	$\frac{\mu_2} {i_2}$	$\frac{\mu_3} {i_3}$	$\frac{\mu_4} {i_4}$	$\frac{\mu_5} {i_5}$	$\frac{\mu_6} {i_6}$
2000: first manufacturer to use the Lepelletier gearset mechanism: ZF 6HP 1st generation
ZF 6HP 26 (Note: for Rear-wheel drive cars) ZF 6HP 19 ZF 6HP 32	600 N⋅m (443 lb⋅ft); 400 N⋅m (295 lb⋅ft) (Note: 400 N⋅m (295 lbf⋅ft) or 400 N⋅m (295 lbf⋅ft)); 750 N⋅m (553 lb⋅ft); 2000 (all)	37; 71	31; 38	38; 85	2; 3	6.0354; 4.9236	1.6977
ZF 6HP 26 ZF 6HP 19 ZF 6HP 32	600 N⋅m (443 lb⋅ft); 400 N⋅m (295 lb⋅ft); 750 N⋅m (553 lb⋅ft); 2000 (all)	37; 71	31; 38	38; 85	2; 3	6.0354; 4.9236	1.4327
Gear	R	1	2	3	4	5	6
Gear Ratio	−3.4025 $-\tfrac{4,590}{1,349}$	4.1708 $\tfrac{9,180}{2,201}$	2.3397 $\tfrac{211,140}{90,241}$	1.5211 $\tfrac{108}{71}$	1.1428 $\tfrac{9,180}{8,033}$	0.8672 $\tfrac{4,590}{5,293}$	0.6911 $\tfrac{85}{123}$
Step	0.8158	1.0000	1.7826	1.5382	1.3311	1.3178	1.2549
Δ Step			1.1589	1.1559	1.0101	1.0502	
Speed	–1.2258	1.0000	1.7826	2.7419	3.6497	4.8096	6.0354
Δ Speed	1.2258	1.0000	0.7826	0.9593	0.9078	1.1599	1.2258
Torque Ratio	–3.3116 –3.2665	4.0186; 3.9436	2.2837; 2.2559	1.5107; 1.5055	1.1359; 1.1325	0.8633; 0.8613	0.6867; 0.6845
Efficiency $\eta_n$	0.9733; 0.9600	0.9635; 0.9455	0.9761; 0.9642	0.9931; 0.9897	0.9939; 0.9910	0.9955; 0.9932	0.9937; 0.9905
2007: ZF 6HP 2nd generation
ZF 6HP 28 ZF 6HP 21 ZF 6HP 34	600 N⋅m (443 lb⋅ft); 450 N⋅m (332 lb⋅ft) (Note: produced in the PRC, alternatively known as 6HP 19tu and 6HP 19z); 750 N⋅m (553 lb⋅ft) (Note: planned, but never went into production); 2007 (all)	37; 71	31; 38	38; 85	2; 3	6.0354; 4.9236	1.6977
ZF 6HP 28 ZF 6HP 21 ZF 6HP 34	600 N⋅m (443 lb⋅ft); 450 N⋅m (332 lb⋅ft); 750 N⋅m (553 lb⋅ft); 2007 (all)	37; 71	31; 38	38; 85	2; 3	6.0354; 4.9236	1.4327
Gear	R	1	2	3	4	5	6
Gear Ratio	−3.4025	4.1708	2.3397	1.5211	1.1428	0.8672	0.6911
Other manufacturer using the Lepelletier gear mechanism
Aisin AWTF-80 SC	450 N⋅m (332 lb⋅ft); 2005	50; 90	36; 44	44; 96	2; 3	6.0494; 4.9495	1.6865
Aisin AWTF-80 SC	450 N⋅m (332 lb⋅ft); 2005	50; 90	36; 44	44; 96	2; 3	6.0494; 4.9495	1.4333
Gear	R	1	2	3	4	5	6
Gear Ratio	−3.3939 $-\tfrac{112}{33}$	4.1481 $\tfrac{112}{27}$	2.3704 $\tfrac{64}{27}$	1.5556 $\tfrac{14}{9}$	1.1546 $\tfrac{112}{97}$	0.8593 $\tfrac{336}{391}$	0.6857 $\tfrac{24}{35}$
Step	0.8182	1.0000	1.7500	1.5238	1.3472	1.3436	1.2532
Δ Step			1.1484	1.1311	1.0027	1.0722	
Speed	–1.2222	1.0000	1.7500	2.6667	3.5926	4.8272	6.0494
Δ Speed	1.2222	1.0000	0.7500	0.9167	0.9259	1.2346	1.2222
Torque Ratio	–3.3023 –3.2568	3.9956; 3.9204	2.3127; 2.2841	1.5444; 1.5389	1.1471; 1.1434	0.8553; 0.8532	0.6813; 0.6791
Efficiency $\eta_n$	0.9730; 0.9596	0.9632; 0.9451	0.9757; 0.9636	0.9929; 0.9893	0.9935; 0.9903	0.9953; 0.9928	0.9936; 0.9904
Ford 6R 60 6R 80 6R 100 (Note: Ford 6R 100 and 6R 140: for commercial vehicles)	600 N⋅m (443 lb⋅ft); 800 N⋅m (590 lb⋅ft); 2005 (both); 1,000 N⋅m (738 lb⋅ft); 2016	37; 71	31; 38	38; 85	2; 3	6.0354; 4.9236	1.6977
Ford 6R 60 6R 80 6R 100	600 N⋅m (443 lb⋅ft); 800 N⋅m (590 lb⋅ft); 2005 (both); 1,000 N⋅m (738 lb⋅ft); 2016	37; 71	31; 38	38; 85	2; 3	6.0354; 4.9236	1.4327
Gear	R	1	2	3	4	5	6
Gear Ratio	−3.4025	4.1708	2.3397	1.5211	1.1428	0.8672	0.6911
Ford 6R 140	1,400 N⋅m (1,033 lb⋅ft); 2010	49; 95	37; 47	47; 97	2; 3	5.8993; 4.6441	1.6361
Ford 6R 140	1,400 N⋅m (1,033 lb⋅ft); 2010	49; 95	37; 47	47; 97	2; 3	5.8993; 4.6441	1.4261
Gear	R	1	2	3	4	5	6
Gear Ratio	−3.1283 $-\tfrac{13,968}{4,485}$	3.9738 $\tfrac{13,968}{3,515}$	2.3181 $\tfrac{8,148}{3,515}$	1.5158 $\tfrac{144}{95}$	1.1492 $\tfrac{13,968}{12,155}$	0.8585 $\tfrac{13,968}{16,271}$	0.6736 $\tfrac{97}{144}$
Step	0.7872	1.0000	1.7143	1.5293	1.3190	1.3389	1.2744
Δ Step			1.1210	1.1594	0.9854	1.0504	
Speed	–1.2703	1.0000	1.7143	2.6216	3.4580	4.6290	5.8993
Δ Speed	1.2703	1.0000	0.7143	0.9073	0.8364	1.1710	1.2703
Torque Ratio	–3.0449 –3.0035	3.8290; 3.7576	2.2615; 2.2333	1.5055; 1.5003	1.1419; 1.1383	0.8543; 0.8522	0.6692; 0.6669
Efficiency $\eta_n$	0.9733; 0.9601	0.9635; 0.9456	0.9756; 0.9635	0.9932; 0.9898	0.9937; 0.9906	0.9952; 0.9927	0.9934; 0.9900
GM 6L 45 6L 50	500 N⋅m (369 lb⋅ft); 2006	49; 89	37; 47	47; 97	2; 3	6.0346; 4.7507	1.6548
GM 6L 45 6L 50	500 N⋅m (369 lb⋅ft); 2006	49; 89	37; 47	47; 97	2; 3	6.0346; 4.7507	1.4326
Gear	R	1	2	3	4	5	6
Gear Ratio	−3.2001 $-\tfrac{13,386}{4,183}$	4.0650 $\tfrac{13,386}{3,293}$	2.3712 $\tfrac{15,617}{63586}$	1.5506 $\tfrac{138}{89}$	1.1567 $\tfrac{13,386}{11,573}$	0.8532 $\tfrac{13,386}{15,689}$	0.6736 $\tfrac{97}{144}$
Step	0.7872	1.0000	1.7143	1.5293	1.3406	1.3557	1.2662
Δ Step			1.1210	1.1408	0.9889	1.0703	
Speed	–1.2703	1.0000	1.7143	2.6216	3.5144	4.7643	6.0346
Δ Speed	1.2703	1.0000	0.7143	0.9073	0.8928	1.2499	1.2703
Torque Ratio	–3.1138 –3.0710	3.9156; 3.8421	2.3127; 2.2826	1.5396; 1.5340	1.1490; 1.1453	0.8490; 0.8468	0.6692; 0.6692
Efficiency $\eta_n$	0.9730; 0.9597	0.9633; 0.9452	0.9753; 0.9630	0.9929; 0.9893	0.9934; 0.9902	0.9951; 0.9925	0.9934; 0.9900
GM 6L 80 6L 90	800 N⋅m (590 lb⋅ft); 2005	50; 94	35; 46	46; 92	2; 3	6.0401; 4.5957	1.6384
GM 6L 80 6L 90	800 N⋅m (590 lb⋅ft); 2005	50; 94	35; 46	46; 92	2; 3	6.0401; 4.5957	1.4329
Gear	R	1	2	3	4	5	6
Gear Ratio	−3.0638 $-\tfrac{144}{47}$	4.0267 $\tfrac{6,624}{1,645}$	2.3635 $\tfrac{3,888}{1,645}$	1.5319 $\tfrac{72}{47}$	1.1522 $\tfrac{6,624}{5,749}$	0.8521 $\tfrac{144}{169}$	0.6667 $\tfrac{2}{3}$
Step	0.7609	1.0000	1.7037	1.5429	1.3296	1.3522	1.2781
Δ Step			1.1043	1.1604	0.9832	1.0580	
Speed	–1.3143	1.0000	1.7037	2.6286	3.4948	4.7258	6.0401
Δ Speed	1.3143	1.0000	0.7037	0.9249	0.8662	1.2310	1.3143
Torque Ratio	–2.9817 –2.9410	3.8794; 3.8068	2.3048; 2.2756	1.5213; 1.5160	1.1448; 1.1412	0.8478; 0.8456	0.6622; 0.6599
Efficiency $\eta_n$	0.9732; 0.9599	0.9634; 0.9454	0.9751; 0.9628	0.9931; 0.9896	0.9936; 0.9904	0.9950; 0.9924	0.9932; 0.9898
Actuated Shift Elements (Note: Permanently coupled elements: Apart from Ravigneaux couplings, there are no permanent couplings)
Brake A (Note: Blocks R_{2} and S_{3})		❶	❶	❶	❶		
Brake B (Note: Blocks C_{2}/C_{3} (the common carrier of the compound Ravigneaux gearset))	❶			❶		❶	
Clutch C (Note: Couples C_{1} and S_{2})			❶				❶
Clutch D (Note: Couples C_{1} with R_{2} and S_{3})	❶	❶					
Clutch E (Note: Couples R_{1} with C_{2}/C_{3} (the common carrier of the compound Ravigneaux gearset))					❶	❶	❶
Geometric Ratios: Speed Conversion
Gear Ratio R & 3 & 6 Ordinary (Note: Ordinary noted: For direct determination of the ratio) Elementary Noted (Note: Elementary noted: Alternative representation for determining the transmission ratio; Contains only operands; With simple fractions of both central gears of a planetary gearset; Or with the value 1; As a basis; For reliable; And traceable; Determination of the torque conversion rate and efficiency)	$i_R = -\frac{R_3 (S_1+ R_1)} {R_1 S_3}$		$i_3 = \frac{S_1+ R_1} {R_1}$		$i_6 = \frac{R_3} {S_3+ R_3}$		
Gear Ratio R & 3 & 6 Ordinary Elementary Noted	$i_R = -\left(1+ \tfrac{S_1} {R_1} \right) \tfrac{R_3} {S_3}$		$i_3 = 1+ \tfrac{S_1} {R_1}$		$i_6 = \tfrac{1} {1+ \tfrac{S_3} {R_3}}$		
Gear Ratio 1 & 2 Ordinary Elementary Noted	$i_1 = \frac{R_2 R_3 (S_1+ R_1)} {R_1 S_2 S_3}$			$i_2 = \frac{R_3 (S_1+ R_1) (S_2+ R_2)} {R_1 S_2 (S_3+ R_3)}$			
Gear Ratio 1 & 2 Ordinary Elementary Noted	$i_1 = \left(1+ \tfrac{S_1} {R_1} \right) \tfrac{R_2 R_3} {S_2 S_3}$			$i_2 = \tfrac{\left( 1+ \tfrac{S_1} {R_1} \right) \left(1+ \tfrac{R_2} {S_2} \right)} {1+ \tfrac{S_3} {R_3}}$			
Gear Ratio 4 & 5 Ordinary Elementary Noted	$i_4 = \frac{R_2 R_3 (S_1+ R_1)} {R_2 R_3 (S_1+ R_1)- S_1 S_2 S_3}$			$i_5 = \frac{R_3 (S_1+ R_1)} {R_3 (S_1+ R_1)+ S_1 S_3}$			
Gear Ratio 4 & 5 Ordinary Elementary Noted	$i_4 = \tfrac{1} {1- \tfrac{\tfrac{S_2 S_3} {R_2 R_3}} {1+ \tfrac{R_1} {S_1}}}$			$i_5 = \tfrac{1} {1+ \tfrac{\tfrac{S_3} {R_3}} {1+ \tfrac{R_1} {S_1}}}$			
Kinetic Ratios: Torque Conversion
Torque Ratio R & 3 & 6	$\mu_R = -\left(1+ \tfrac{S_1} {R_1} \eta_0\right) \tfrac{R_3} {S_3} \eta_0$		$\mu_3 = 1+ \tfrac{S_1} {R_1} \eta_0$		$\mu_6 = \tfrac{1} {1+ \tfrac{S_3} {R_3} \cdot \tfrac{1} {\eta_0}}$		
Torque Ratio 1 & 2	$\mu_1 = \left(1+ \tfrac{S_1} {R_1} \eta_0\right) \tfrac{R_2 R_3} {S_2 S_3} {\eta_0}^\tfrac{3} {2}$			$\mu_2 = \tfrac{\left( 1+ \tfrac{S_1} {R_1} \eta_0\right) \left(1+ \tfrac{R_2} {S_2} \eta_0\right)} {1+ \tfrac{S_3} {R_3} \cdot \tfrac{1} {\eta_0}}$			
Torque Ratio 4 & 5	$\mu_4 = \tfrac{1} {1- \tfrac{\tfrac{S_2 S_3} {R_2 R_3} {\eta_0}^\tfrac{3} {2}} {1+ \tfrac{R_1} {S_1} \cdot \tfrac{1} {\eta_0}}}$			$\mu_5 = \tfrac{1} {1+ \tfrac{\tfrac{S_3} {R_3} \cdot \tfrac{1} {\eta_0}} {1+ \tfrac{R_1} {S_1} \eta_0}}$			

=== Illustration ===
In the illustrations, the Ravigneaux gearset is shown vertically mirrored, contrary to actual practice, for the sake of clarity.

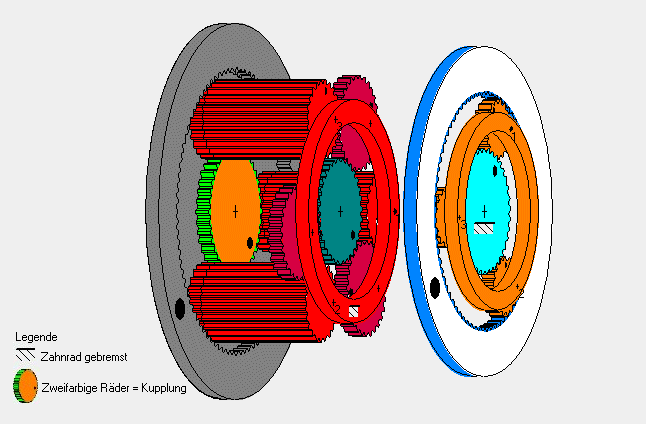
Reverse gear

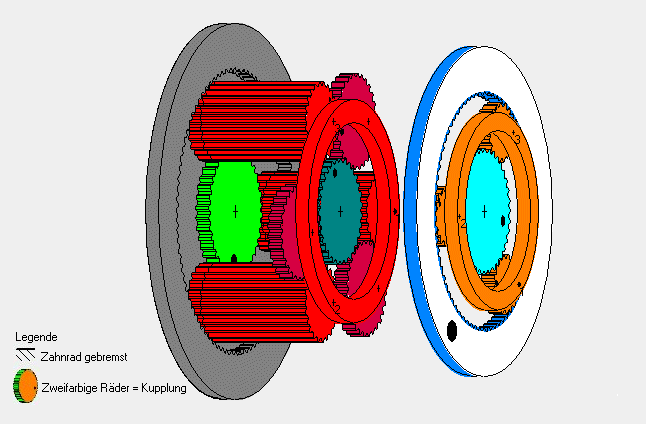
Neutral

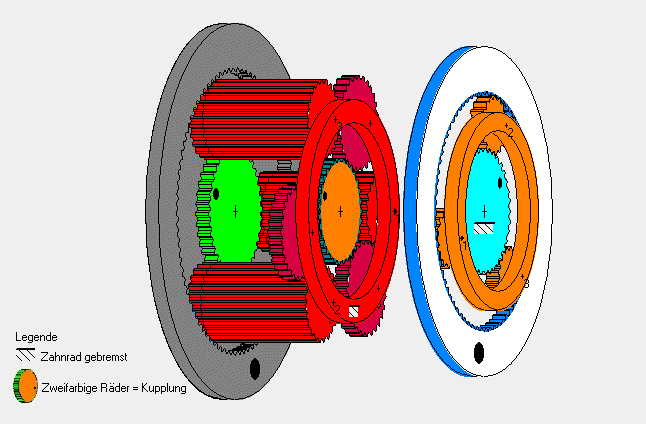
1st gear

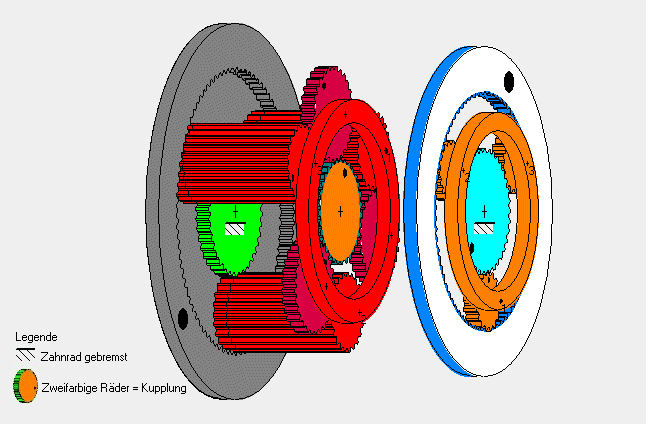
2nd gear

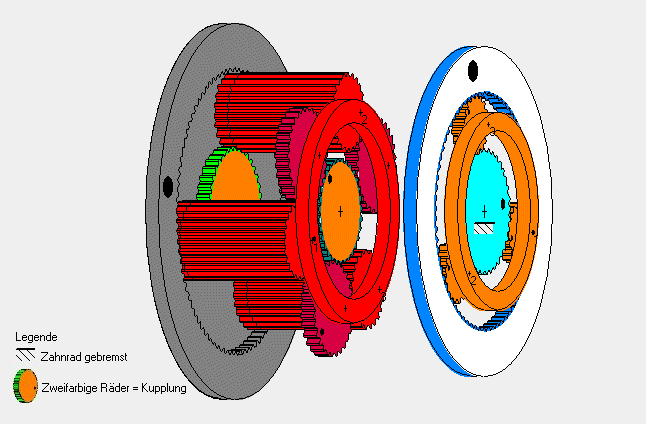
3rd gear

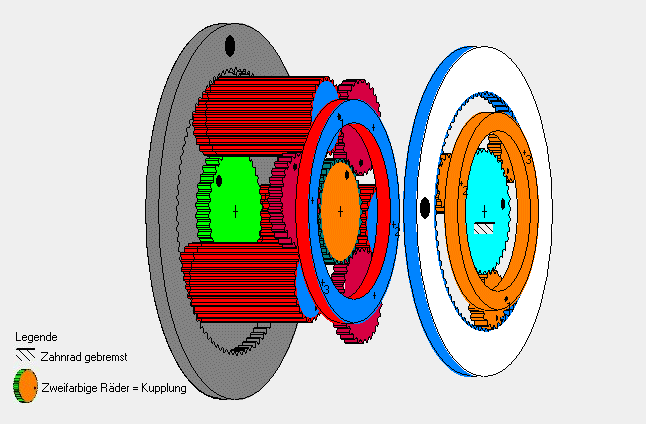
4th gear

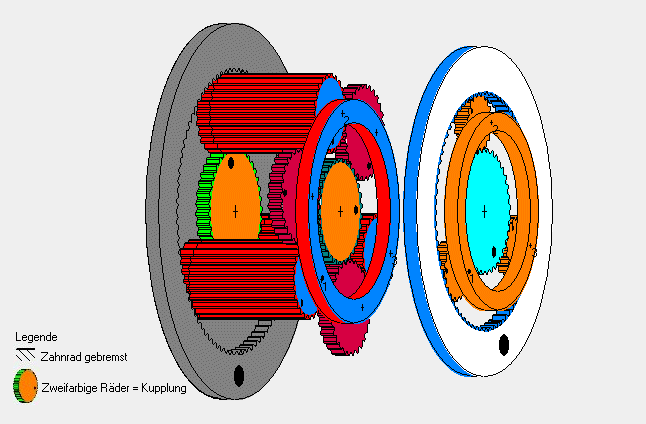
5th gear: not used in actual existing gearboxes

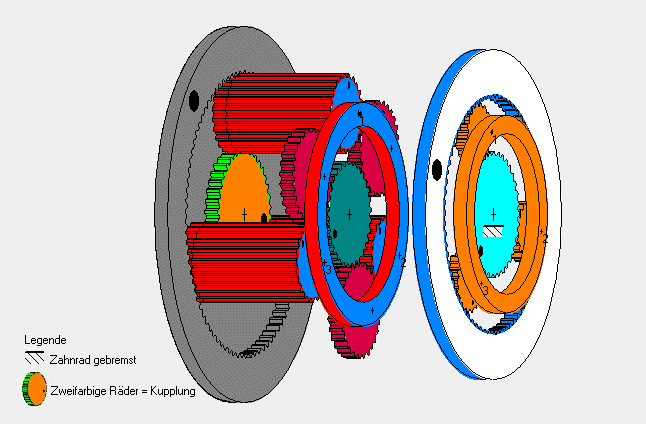
6th gear: 5th gear in actual existing gearboxes

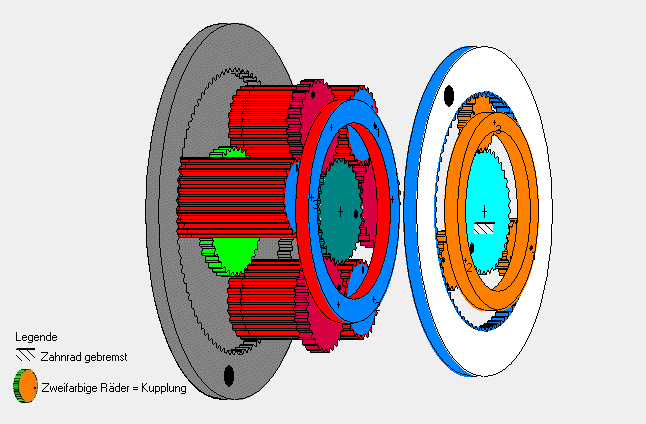
7th gear: 6th gear in actual existing gearboxes

=== Limitations ===
The limitations of the Lepelletier gearset mechanism lie in the number of gear ratios provided and in the efficiency issues that Ravigneaux gearsets always contend with. Therefore, starting in 2008 with the ZF 8HP, the Lepelletier gearset mechanism was replaced by gearset concepts with even more gears and largely dispensing with the use of Ravigneaux gearsets. This was followed later by the GM 8L, Aisin-Toyota 8-speed transmission, and the Ford-GM 10-speed transmission, for example.

== Applications ==
The gearset was used in a wide range of automatic vehicle transmissions.

== See also ==
- ZF 6HP transmission
- Ford 6R transmission
- GM 6L transmission
- Aisin AWTF-80 SC
