= AWTF-80 SC =

6-speed automatic transmission from 2005

Overview
- Manufacturer: Aisin Seiki
- Production: 2005 – 2019
- Model years: 2005 – 2019

Body and chassis
- Class: 6-Speed transverse automatic transmission
- Related: Lepelletier planetary gearset Ford 6R; GM 6L; ZF 6HP

Chronology
- Predecessor: Aisin TB-50LS
- Successor: Aisin-Toyota 8-speed

The Aisin AW TF-8# SC series is a 6-speed automatic transmission designed for use in transverse engine applications produced by Aisin Seiki. It uses a Lepelletier planetary gearset, an epicyclic gearset, which can provide more gear ratios with significantly fewer components than prior models could.

It was first realized in 2000 with the 6HP from ZF Friedrichshafen. The Ford 6R, GM 6L, and ZF 6HP transmissions are based on the same globally patented gearset concept. The AWTF-80 SC is the only one for transverse engine installation.

== Key data ==
Gear ratios (Note: Differences in gear ratios have a measurable, direct impact on vehicle dynamics, performance, waste emissions as well as fuel mileage)
Model	First Deliv- ery	Gear							Total Span			Avg. Step	Components		Nomenclature			
Model	First Deliv- ery	R	1	2	3	4	5	6	Nomi- nal	Effec- tive	Cen- ter	Avg. Step	Total	per Gear (Note: Forward gears only)	Gears Count	Cou- pling	Gear- sets	Maximum Input Torque
Aisin AWTF-80	2005	−3.394	4.148	2.370	1.556	1.155	0.859	0.686	6.049	4.949	1.687	1.433	3 Gearsets; 2 Brakes; 3 Clutches	1.333	6	TF (Note: Installation: Transverse for front-engine, front-wheel-drive layout)		450 N⋅m (332 lb⋅ft)
ZF 6HP All	2000 (Note: first transmission to use the Lepelletier planetary gearset concept)	−3.403	4.171	2.340	1.521	1.143	0.867	0.691	6.035	4.924	1.698	1.433	3 Gearsets; 2 Brakes; 3 Clutches	1.333	6	H (Note: Hydraulic torque converter · German: Hydraulischer Wandler oder Drehmomentwandler)	P (Note: Planetary gearing · German: Planetenradsätze)	400 N⋅m (295 lb⋅ft) – 750 N⋅m (553 lb⋅ft)

== History ==
It is built in Anjō, Japan, and is also called TF-80SC (AWF21), AF40-6, AM6, AW6A-EL and TF-81SC (AF21). All-wheel drive transfer cases can be fitted to the AWTF-80 SC.

== Specifications ==
=== Gearset layout ===
A conventional 5-pinion planetary gearset and a compound Ravigneaux gearset is combined in a Lepelletier planetary gearset, to reduce both the size and weight. This means the Aisin AW TF-8# SC series is actually lighter than its five-speed predecessors.

Like all transmissions realized with Lepelletier planetary gearset, the AWTF-80 SC also dispenses with the use of the direct gear ratio, making it one of the very few automatic transmission concepts without such a ratio. It has a torque converter lock-up for all 6 forward gears, which can be fully disengage when stationary, largely closing the fuel efficiency gap between vehicles with automatic and manual transmissions.

Features
Maximum shaft speed	7,000/min	6,500/min
Maximum torque	350 N⋅m (258 lb⋅ft)	400 N⋅m (295 lb⋅ft)
Torque converter diameter	260 mm (10.2 in)	
Length	358 mm (14.1 in)	
Weight	90 kg (198 lb)	

=== Gearbox control ===
To reduce external wiring as well as to provide a constant environment for the transmission control module (TCM), it is located inside the transmission housing. Gear shifting is managed by a computer program that oversees a clutch-to-clutch actuation that allows one clutch engage the instant the clutch from the previous gear disengages. When idling and with the foot brake depressed neutral gear is selected automatically. This helps to reduce internal temperatures and improve the fuel economy.

== Planetary gearset concept ==
=== Improved fuel economy ===
The main objective in replacing the predecessor model was to improve vehicle fuel economy with extra speeds and a wider gear span to allow the engine speed level to be lowered (downspeeding), which is a decisive factor in improving energy efficiency and thus reducing fuel consumption. In addition, the lower engine speed level improves the noise-vibration-harshness comfort and the exterior noise is reduced. It has a torque converter lock-up for all 6 forward gears, which can be fully disengage when stationary, largely closing the fuel efficiency gap between vehicles with automatic and manual transmissions.

=== Reduced manufacturing complexity ===
In order to avoid a further increase in manufacturing complexity while expanding the number of gear ratios, ZF switched from the conventional design method—in which the planetary gearset concept was limited to a purely serial or in-line power flow—to a more modern design method that utilizes a planetary gearset concept with combined parallel and serial power flow. This was only possible thanks to computer-aided design and has resulted in a globally patented gearset concept. The AWTF-80 is based on the 6HP from ZF, which was the first transmission designed according to this new paradigm. After gaining additional gear ratios only with additional components, this time the number of components has to decrease while the number of ratios still increase. The resulting progress is reflected in a much better ratio of the number of gears to the number of components used compared to existing layouts.

=== Quality ===
The ratios of the 6 gears are evenly distributed in all versions. Exceptions are the large step from 1st to 2nd gear and the almost geometric steps from 3rd to 4th to 5th gear. They cannot be eliminated without affecting all other gears. As the large step is shifted due to the large span to a lower speed range than with conventional gearboxes, it is less significant. As the gear steps are smaller overall due to the additional gear(s), the geometric gear steps are still smaller than the corresponding gear steps of conventional gearboxes. Overall, therefore, the weaknesses are not overly significant. As the selected gearset concept saves up to 2 components compared to 5-speed transmissions, the advantages clearly outweigh the disadvantages.

The layout brings the ability to shift in a non-sequential manner – going from gear 6 to gear 2 in extreme situations simply by changing one shift element (actuating clutch E and releasing brake A).

== Applications ==
Variants and applications
Model	Car Model (Note: w/o any claim of completeness)
BMW Group
BMW	2014–2020 i8; 2015–present 225xe Active Tourer (F45); 2020–present X1 xDrive 25e (F48); 2020–present X2 xDrive 25e (F39)
Mini	2014–2017 Cooper (F56/55); 2015–2017 Clubman (F54) (Note: with 3 cylinder engines (B37 · B38)); 2016–2017 Countryman (F60) (Note: with 3 cylinder engines (B37 & B38 FWD))
Fiat Chrysler Automobiles (Note: Predecessor of Stellantis)
Alfa Romeo	2005–2011 159 (Note: 1.9 JTDm · 2.4 JTDm · 3.2 JTS); 2005–2010 Brera (Note: 2.4 JTDm · 3.2 JTS); 2006–2010 Spider (Note: 2.4 JTDm · 3.2 JTS)
Fiat	2005–2011 Croma (Note: 1.9 JTDm · 2.4 JTDm); 2012–2019 500
Lancia	2008–2014 Delta (Note: 1.8 DI Turbo)
Ford Motor Company
Ford	2005–2007 Five Hundred; 2006–2012 Ford Fusion (US); 2007–2014 Mondeo MkIV (Note: 2.3 118 kW (160 PS) Petrol · 2.0 TDCi Diesel); 2006–2014 Galaxy (Note: 2.3 118 kW (160 PS) Petrol (as standard gearbox))
Lincoln	2006 Zephyr; 2007–2012 MKZ
Mercury	2005–2010 Milan; 2005–2007 Montego
General Motors
Cadillac	2005–2010 BLS (Note: 1.9 D · 1.9 D (TST)); 2009–2016 SRX II
Chevrolet	2008–2016 Cruze (Note: US market · 2.0 L Turbo Diesel)
Opel Vauxhall	Astra; Vectra; Signum; Zafira; 2008–2017 Insignia; 2014–2017 Meriva
Saab	2006–2014 9-3 II (FWD & AWD) (Note: 1.9 TiD · 1.9 TTiD · Aero 2.8 L); 2013–2014 9-3 III; 2010–2012 9-5 II
Hyundai
Hyundai	2006–2014 Veracruz
Jaguar Land Rover
Jaguar	2007–2009 X-Type
Land Rover	2006–2014 Freelander 2; 2011–2013 Evoque
Luxgen
Luxgen	2013–2015 S5 2.0 T; 2015-2019 S5 ecohyper; 2019–Present S5 GT (GT 225) · 1.8 T; 2014–2015 U6; 2015–2018 U6 ecohyper; 2018–Present Luxgen U6 GT (GT 220) 1.8 T; 2016–Present Luxgen M7 ecohyper 2.2 T; 2016–Present Luxgen U7 ecohyper 2.2 T; 2019–Present URX 1.8 T
Mahindra & Mahindra
Mahindra & Mahindra	2015–present XUV 500
Mazda
Mazda	2005–2008 6 I; 2006–2012 CX-7; 2006–present CX-9; 2006–present MPV III; 2007–2012 6 II
PSA Group
Citroën (Note: 1.6 THP · 2.0 HDİ)	C4; C5; C6; DS3; DS4; DS5; 2010–2016 Jumpy; C-Elysée
Peugeot (Note: 1.6 THP · 2.0 HDİ)	2006–2008 307; 2014–2018 308; 2005–2010 407; 2010–present 408 (Saloon); 2011–2018 508; 2005–2010 607; 2008– 3008; 2009– 5008; 2010–2016 Expert
Renault
Renault	2005–2009 Vel Satis; 2006–2010 Espace
Suzuki
Suzuki	2014–present Vitara (FWD & AWD); 2015–present Baleno; 2017–present Swift; 2017–present SX4 S-Cross
Toyota Group & Lotus
Toyota (Note: as Toyota U6xx · Toyota U760e)	2006–2008 Previa (V6); 2007–2018 Camry; 2007–2017 Aurion (V6); 2007–2012 Blade (V6); 2007–2013 Mark X Zio (V6); 2008–2016 Highlander; 2008–2017 Alphard (V6); 2008–2018 Avalon; 2008–2018 RAV4; 2009–2017 Venza; 2011–2016 Sienna; 2017 ProAce
Lexus	2007–2018 ES250 & ES350 (Note: 250 2012–2018); 2010–2022 RX (Note: 350 older models · 200t/300 new models); 2015–2021 NX200t (Note: 300 2018–present); 2019–2023d LM350 (HK)
Lotus
Lotus	2012 Evora (IPS); 2022– Emira (V6)
Scion	2011–2016 tC
Volkswagen Group
Audi	2003–2013 A3; 2015–2018 Q3
Škoda	Octavia; Rapid (Note: India, 2019 improvement)
VW	2003–2010 Transporter; 2007 Jetta; 2009–2017 Tiguan; 2012–2022 Passat; 2019–present Polo (MK5) (India)
Volvo
Volvo	2005–2014 XC90 (FWD & AWD) (Note: D5 & D5 AWD · 3.2 · T6 & V8 AWD); 2006–2009 S60 (FWD & AWD) (Note: 2.4 D · D5 & D5 AWD · 2.5 T & R AWD (2006–2008)); 2006–2008 Volvo V70 II (FWD & AWD) (Note: 2.4 D · D5 & D5 AWD · 2.5 T & R AWD (2006–2007)); 2006–2008 XC70 (AWD); 2007–2016 S80 II (FWD & AWD) (Note: D5 & D5 AWD · 2.5 T · 2.5 FT · 3.2 · T6 & V8 AWD); 2008–2016 V70 III (FWD & AWD) (Note: D4 AWD · D5 & D5 AWD · 2.5 T · 2.5 FT · 3.2 & T6 AWD); 2008–2016 XC70 II (FWD & AWD) (Note: D4 AWD · D5 & D5 AWD · 2.5 T · 2.5 FT · 3.2 & T6 AWD); 2009–2017 XC60 (FWD & AWD) (Note: D4 AWD · D5 & D5 AWD · T6 AWD); 2011–2018 S60 II (FWD & AWD) (Note: D5 & D5 AWD · T6 AWD); 2016–2017 S90 (FWD); 2016–2018 V90 (FWD); 2011–2018 V60 (FWD & AWD) (Note: D3 · D5 & D5 AWD · T6 AWD); 2011–2012 S40 II (FWD); 2011–2012 V50 (FWD); 2011–2013 C30 (FWD); 2011–2013 C70 II (FWD); 2012–2014 V40 II (FWD)

== See also ==
- Lepelletier planetary gearset
- ZF 6HP transmission
- Ford 6R transmission
- GM 6L transmission
- List of Aisin transmissions
- List of Toyota transmissions
- Toyota A transmission
- Toyota U transmission
