= ZF 6HP transmission =

World's first 6-speed automatic from 2000

6HP
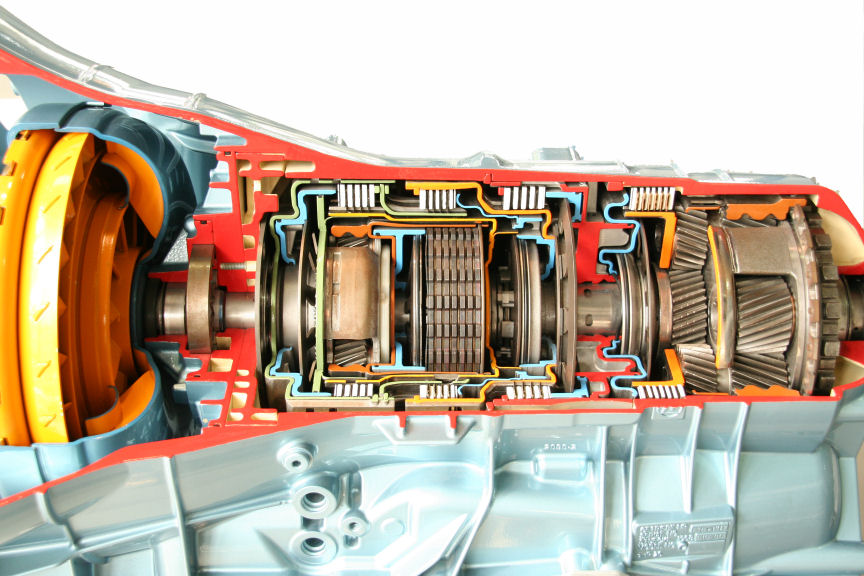
- Automatic Transmission 6HP 26 cutaway

Overview
- Manufacturer: ZF Friedrichshafen
- Production: 2000–2014
- Model years: 2000–2014

Body and chassis
- Class: 6-Speed longitudinal automatic transmission
- Related: Lepelletier planetary gearset Ford 6R; GM 6L; Aisin AWTF-80 SC; MB 7G-Tronic

Dimensions
- Curb weight: 72–99 kg (159–218 lb)

Chronology
- Predecessor: ZF 5HP
- Successor: ZF 8HP

6HP is ZF Friedrichshafen AG's trademark name for its 6-speed automatic transmission models (6-speed transmission with Hydraulic converter and Planetary gearsets) for longitudinal engine applications, designed and built by ZF's subsidiary in Saarbrücken.

It uses the Lepelletier planetary gearset, an epicyclic gearset, which can provide more gear ratios with significantly fewer components. This means the 6HP 26 is actually lighter than its five-speed 5HP predecessors. The 6HP is the first transmission to use the Lepelletier planetary gearset.

The Ford 6R, GM 6L and Aisin AWTF-80 SC transmissions are all based on the same globally patented Lepelletier planetary gearset. The AWTF-80 SC is the only one for transverse engine installation.

== Key data ==
Gear ratios (Note: Differences in gear ratios have a measurable, direct impact on vehicle dynamics, performance, waste emissions as well as fuel mileage)
Model	First Deliv- ery	Gear							Total Span			Avg. Step	Components		Nomenclature			
Model	First Deliv- ery	R	1	2	3	4	5	6	Nomi- nal	Effec- tive	Cen- ter	Avg. Step	Total	per Gear (Note: Forward gears only)	Gears Count	Cou- pling	Gear- sets	Input Shaft Diameter
2000: 1st generation													3 Gearsets; 2 Brakes; 3 Clutches	1.333	6	H (Note: Hydraulic torque converter · German: Hydraulischer Wandler oder Drehmomentwandler)	P (Note: Planetary gearing · German: Planetenradsätze)	2000
6HP 26 (Note: first transmission to use the 6-speed Lepelletier planetary gearset) · 6HP 19 · 6HP 32		−3.403	4.171	2.340	1.521	1.143	0.867	0.691	6.035	4.924	1.698	1.433	3 Gearsets; 2 Brakes; 3 Clutches	1.333	6	H	P	26 mm · 19 mm · 32 mm
2007: 2nd generation													3 Gearsets; 2 Brakes; 3 Clutches	1.333	6	H	P	2007
6HP 28 · 6HP 21 · 6HP 34		−3.403	4.171	2.340	1.521	1.143	0.867	0.691	6.035	4.924	1.698	1.433	3 Gearsets; 2 Brakes; 3 Clutches	1.333	6	H	P	28 mm · 21 mm · 34 mm
Other manufacturer using the Lepelletier planetary gearset													3 Gearsets; 2 Brakes; 3 Clutches	1.333	6	Installation		Maximum Input Torque
Aisin AWTF-80 SC	2005	−3.394	4.148	2.370	1.556	1.155	0.859	0.686	6.049	4.949	1.687	1.433	3 Gearsets; 2 Brakes; 3 Clutches	1.333	6	transverse		450 N⋅m (332 lb⋅ft)
Ford 6R 60 · 6R 80	2005	−3.403	4.171	2.340	1.521	1.143	0.867	0.691	6.035	4.924	1.698	1.433	3 Gearsets; 2 Brakes; 3 Clutches	1.333	6	R (Note: Installation: rear-wheel drive or four-wheel drive (German: Allrad, all wheel))		600 N⋅m (443 lb⋅ft) · 800 N⋅m (590 lb⋅ft)
Ford 6R 140	2005	−3.128	3.974	2.318	1.516	1.149	0.858	0.674	5.899	4.644	1.636	1.426	3 Gearsets; 2 Brakes; 3 Clutches	1.333	6	R		1,400 N⋅m (1,033 lb⋅ft)
GM 6L 45 · 6L 50	2006	−3.200	4.065	2.371	1.551	1.157	0.853	0.674	6.035	4.751	1.655	1.433	3 Gearsets; 2 Brakes; 3 Clutches	1.333	6	L (Note: Installation: longitudinal engine)		500 N⋅m (369 lb⋅ft)
GM 6L 80 · 6L 90	2005	−3.064	4.027	2.364	1.532	1.152	0.852	0.667	6.040	4.596	1.638	1.433	3 Gearsets; 2 Brakes; 3 Clutches	1.333	6	L		800 N⋅m (590 lb⋅ft) · 1,200 N⋅m (885 lb⋅ft)

== History ==
Released as the 6HP 26 in 2000, it was the first 6-speed automatic transmission in a production passenger car. Other variations of the first generation 6HP in addition to the 6HP 26, were 6HP19, and 6HP 32 having lower and higher torque capacity, respectively. In 2007, the second generation of the 6HP series was introduced, with models 6HP 21 and 6HP 28. A 6HP 34 was planned, but never went into production. The last 6HP automatic transmission was produced by the Saarbrücken plant in March 2014 after 7,050,232 units were produced. The ZF plant in Shanghai continued to produce the 6HP for the Chinese market.

== Planetary gearset concept ==
=== Improved fuel economy ===
The main objective in replacing the predecessor model was to improve vehicle fuel economy with extra speeds and a wider gear span to allow the engine speed level to be lowered (downspeeding), which is a decisive factor in improving energy efficiency and thus reducing fuel consumption. In addition, the lower engine speed level improves the noise-vibration-harshness comfort and the exterior noise is reduced. It has a torque converter lock-up for all 6 forward gears, which can be fully disengage when stationary, largely closing the fuel efficiency gap between vehicles with automatic and manual transmissions.

=== Reduced manufacturing complexity ===
In order to avoid a further increase in manufacturing complexity while expanding the number of gear ratios, ZF switched from the conventional design method—in which the planetary gearset concept was limited to a purely serial or in-line power flow—to a more modern design method that utilizes a planetary gearset concept with combined parallel and serial power flow. This was only possible thanks to computer-aided design and has resulted in a globally patented gearset concept. The resulting progress is reflected in a better ratio of the number of gears to the number of components used compared to existing layouts. The 8HP has become the new reference standard (benchmark) for automatic transmissions.

=== Quality ===
The ratios of the 6 gears are evenly distributed in all versions. Exceptions are the large step from 1st to 2nd gear and the almost geometric steps from 3rd to 4th to 5th gear. They cannot be eliminated without affecting all other gears. As the large step is shifted due to the large span to a lower speed range than with conventional gearboxes, it is less significant. As the gear steps are smaller overall due to the additional gear(s), the geometric gear steps are still smaller than the corresponding gear steps of conventional gearboxes. Overall, therefore, the weaknesses are not overly significant. As the selected gearset concept saves up to 2 components compared to 5-speed transmissions, the advantages clearly outweigh the disadvantages.

The layout brings the ability to shift in a non-sequential manner – going from gear 6 to gear 2 in extreme situations simply by changing one shift element (actuating clutch E and releasing brake A).

In a Lepelletier planetary gearset, a conventional planetary gearset and a composite Ravigneaux gearset are combined to reduce both the size and weight as well as the manufacturing costs. Like all transmissions realized with Lepelletier transmissions, the 6HP also dispenses with the use of the direct gear ratio and is thus one of the very few automatic transmission concepts without such a ratio.

== Imperfections ==
Problems with this transmission are well known. This transmission locks up the torque converter in all gears, increasing wear. Combined with a sealed transmission pan and "lifetime fluid", some people have experienced catastrophic transmission failure. Owners report shift issues when oil begins breaking down beyond 50K miles, hence shifting issues are common.

There are also problems with the valve block and solenoids. When this failure starts to occur, shift quality and speed, torque transfer and even loss of ability to engage gears can occur. These problems led Volkswagen Group to extend the warranty on all of their vehicles equipped with this transmission to 100,000 miles or 10 years.

== Applications ==
Variants and applications
Model	Car Model (Note: w/o any claim of completeness)
2000: 1st generation
6HP 19	BMW X3; BMW 520i (E60); BMW 528i (E60); BMW 530i (E60); BMW 630i (E63); BMW 730i/li (E65/E66); E9X pre-LCI: BMW 318i, 320i, 323i, 325i, 328i, 330i, 335i; E87 pre-LCI: BMW 116i, 118i, 120i; E82 (similar to E87): 135i; E81 (similar to E87): 118d; BMW Z4 Roadster (E85) LCI; BMW Z4 Coupé (E86): all models except Z4 M; BMW Z4 (E89): 23i / 30i; 2010–2012 Hyundai Genesis Coupe 3.8 L
6HP 19A (Note: The 6HP 19A is a variation of the 6HP 19 for Four-wheel drive applications (German: Allrad, all wheel). It was used by the Volkswagen Group for some permanent four-wheel drive models)	Audi (B6) S4 (Typ 8E/8H); Audi (B7) A4/S4 (Typ 8E/8H); Audi A6 (Typ C6/4F): 3.0 TDI, 3.2 FSI, 4.2 FSI, 3.0 TFSI; Audi Q5 (Typ 8R): 3.2 FSI (US only)
6HP 26 (Note: The 6HP 26 was the initial version and first used by the BMW 7 Series (E65) in 2001. Initially only used by premium brands, it was later available on the 2009 model year V8 Hyundai Genesis. Several versions of the 6HP 26 are available depending on application and brand: 6HP 26, 6HP 26A and 6HP 26X. Ford has developed their own versions (Ford 6R 60 and 6R 80) based on the 6HP 26. Therefore, certain Ford vehicles will not be listed)	2001–2008 BMW 7 Series (E65): 735i, 745i, 760i, 730d and 740d; 2002–2005 Jaguar XK8/XKR (X100); 2003–2012 Aston Martin DB9; 2003–2007 BMW 5 Series (E60); 2003–2010 BMW 6 Series (E63) pre-LCI: 645i, 650i, 635d; 2009–2012 Hyundai Genesis Sedan (4.6 L V8); 2003–2008 Jaguar S-Type; 2003–2009 Jaguar XJ (X350); 2003–2012 Rolls-Royce Phantom; 2005–2011 BMW 3 Series (E90) and E92; 2005–2007 Ford Fairlane/LTD (BF); 2005–2016 Ford Falcon (BF, FG, FG X turbocharged I6 and V8) (Note: Although production of the 6HP 26 ended in 2014, Ford retained sufficient inventory to last until end of Falcon production in 2016); 2005–2014 Ford Territory (SY AWD; SZ petrol); 2005–2008 Lincoln Navigator (second generation facelift and third generation); 2006–2010 Jaguar XK/XKR (X150); 2007–2019 Maserati GranTurismo; 2007–2012 Maserati Quattroporte; 2007–present Rolls-Royce Phantom Drophead Coupé; 2008–2012 Aston Martin DBS V12; 2008–2012 BMW 7 Series (F01) except 740d xDrive, 760i/Li and Hybrid 7; 2008–2011 Kia Mohave; 2008–2012 Jaguar XF (X250); 2006–2009 Bentley Arnage; 2008–2011 Bentley Brooklands; 2010–2014 Aston Martin Rapide; 2011 Hyundai Equus; 2011–2012 Aston Martin Virage; 2012–2014 Aston Martin Vanquish
6HP 26A (Note: The 6HP 26A is a variation of the 6HP 26 for Four-wheel drive applications (German: Allrad, all wheel). It was used by the Volkswagen Group for some permanent four-wheel drive models and packages a TORSEN type center differential, and open front differential into the transmission assembly)	2006–2010 Audi Q7 (Typ 4L) all models except 6.0 L V12 TDI; 2003–2009 Audi A8 (D3, Typ 4E); 2006–2009 Audi S8 (D3, Typ 4E); 2003–2011 Bentley Continental GT; 2005–2013 Bentley Flying Spur; 2006–2011 Audi S6 (C6, Typ 4F); 2002–2011 Volkswagen Phaeton Typ 3D
6HP 26X and 6HP 26Z (Note: The 6HP 26X and 6HP 26Z is another variation of the 6HP 26, also for Four-wheel drive applications (German: Allrad, all wheel). This transmission is suitable for 4WDs with a separate transfer box (the "X" stands for external 4WD))	2006–2013 Land Rover Range Rover: with Jaguar type engines or TDV8; 2006–2013 Land Rover Range Rover Sport: 4.4 L and 5.0 L AJV8 models; 2005–2009 Land Rover Discovery 3 (LR3 in North America); 2010–2013 Land Rover Discovery 4 (LR4 in North America); 2007 BMW X3 (E83): 3.0d (some models); 2005–2011 BMW 3 Series (E90): 330(x)d, (E90/91): xDrive; 2004–2006 BMW X5 (E53) V8 and 3.0D; 2007–2013 BMW X5 (E70) (Note: Facelift models use 8HP except North American Diesel models which had 6HP and M57 engine until the end of production in 2013); 2004–2007 BMW 5 Series (E60): xDrive; 2003–2010 Porsche Cayenne (Typ 9PA); 2003–2010 VW Touareg (Typ 7L)
6HP 32	BMW E65 LCI: 745d
6HP 32A (Note: The 6HP 32A is a variation of the 6HP 32 for Four-wheel drive applications (German: Allrad, all wheel))	Audi Q7 6.0 L V12 TDI
2007: 2nd generation
6HP 21	2011–2014 Ford Falcon (FG 2 turbocharged I4, naturally-aspirated I6, turbocharged I6 and supercharge V8); 2014–2016 Ford Falcon (FG X turbocharged I4, naturally-aspirated I6, turbocharged I6 and supercharged V8); 2014–2016 Ford Territory (SZ II petrol); 2010–2012 BMW 320d LCI (Thailand) with engine N47D20; 2011–2013 BMW 335i (E9X); 2013–2015 BMW X1 (E84): xDrive35i; 2009 LCI BMW 528i (E60) with engine N52B30AE; 2014–Present Maxus G10; 2007–2010 BMW 520d (E60) LCI with engine N47D20; 2007–2010 BMW 525d (E60) LCI with engine M57D30TU2
6HP 28	2009–2012 Jaguar XF (X250); 2009–2014 Jaguar XK (X150); 2010–2012 Jaguar XJ (X351); 2009–2013 BMW E90 LCI: 325d, 330d, 335d; 2007–2010 BMW E60 LCI: 530d, 535d, 535i, 540i, 550i; 2007–2010 BMW E63 LCI: 635d, 650i; 2009–2012 BMW F01: 750i; 2009–2012 BMW F02: 750Li; 2008–2010 Audi RS6 (C6, Typ 4F); 2008–2009 Audi A4 and A5 B8 quattro models
6HP 34 (Note: The 6HP 34 was planned for high-output applications. As the successor 8HP was about to be launched and innovations are typically introduced first in the premium segment, the 6HP 34 never went into production)

== See also ==
- List of ZF transmissions
- Lepelletier planetary gearset
- Ford 6R transmission
- GM 6L transmission
- Aisin AWTF-80 SC
