= Ford 6R transmission =

6-speed automatic from 2005

6R
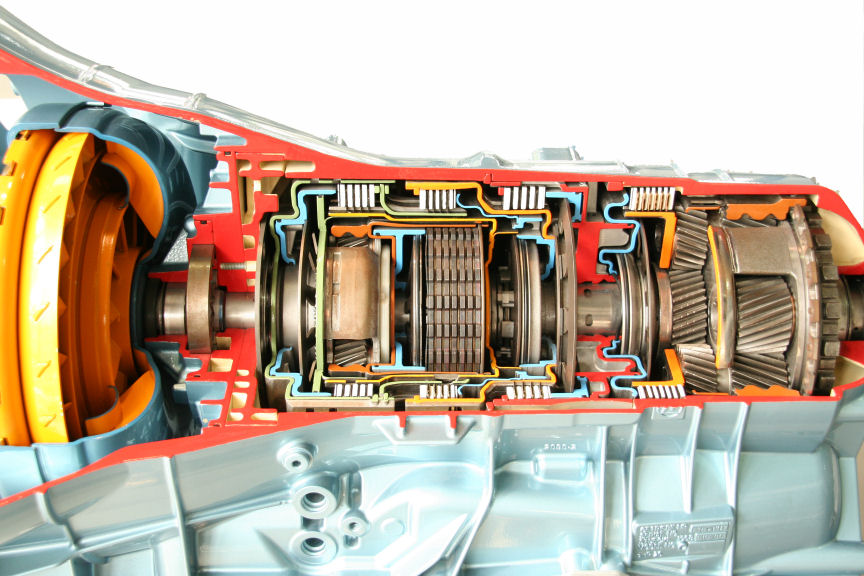
- Automatic Transmission ZF 6HP 26 cutaway

Overview
- Manufacturer: Ford Motor Company
- Production: 2005–present
- Model years: 2005–present

Body and chassis
- Class: 6-speed longitudinal automatic transmission
- Related: Lepelletier planetary gearset GM 6L; ZF 6HP; Aisin AWTF-80 SC

Chronology
- Predecessor: 5R 44-E · 5R 55-E/N/S/W; Ford AOD; 5R 110W
- Successor: Ford 10R 60 · 10R 80 · 10R 100 · 10R 140

The 6R is a 6-speed automatic transmission for longitudinal engine placement in rear-wheel drive vehicles. It is based on the ZF 6HP26 transmission and has been built under license by the Ford Motor Company at its Livonia Transmission plant in Livonia, Michigan. The 6R was introduced in 2005 for the 2006 model year Ford Explorer and Mercury Mountaineer.

It uses a Lepelletier planetary gearset, an epicyclic gearset, which can provide more gear ratios with significantly fewer components. This means the 6R is actually lighter than its five-speed 5R 44-E and 5R 55-E predecessors.

The Lepelletier planetary gearset was first realized in 2000 with the 6HP from ZF Friedrichshafen. The GM 6L, AWTF-80 SC, and ZF 6HP transmissions are based on the same globally patented gearset concept. The AWTF-80 SC is the only one for transverse engine installation.

Gear ratios (Note: Differences in gear ratios have a measurable, direct impact on vehicle dynamics, performance, waste emissions as well as fuel mileage)
Model	First Deliv- ery	Gear							Total Span			Avg. Step	Components		Nomenclature			
Model	First Deliv- ery	R	1	2	3	4	5	6	Nomi- nal	Effec- tive	Cen- ter	Avg. Step	Total	per Gear (Note: Forward gears only)	Gears Count	Cou- pling	Gear- sets	Maximum Input Torque
Ford 6R 60 · 6R 80 6R 100 (Note: 6R 100 and 6R 140: for commercial vehicles)	2005; 2016	−3.403	4.171	2.340	1.521	1.143	0.867	0.691	6.035	4.924	1.698	1.433	3 Gearsets; 2 Brakes; 3 Clutches	1.333	6	R (Note: Installation: rear-wheel drive or four-wheel drive)		600 N⋅m (443 lb⋅ft) · 800 N⋅m (590 lb⋅ft); 1,000 N⋅m (738 lb⋅ft)
Ford 6R 140	2010	−3.128	3.974	2.318	1.516	1.149	0.858	0.674	5.899	4.644	1.636	1.426	3 Gearsets; 2 Brakes; 3 Clutches	1.333	6	R		1,400 N⋅m (1,033 lb⋅ft)
ZF 6HP All	2000 (Note: first transmission to use the Lepelletier planetary gearset concept)	−3.403	4.171	2.340	1.521	1.143	0.867	0.691	6.035	4.924	1.698	1.433	3 Gearsets; 2 Brakes; 3 Clutches	1.333	6	H (Note: Hydraulic torque converter · German: Hydraulischer Wandler oder Drehmomentwandler)	P (Note: Planetary gearing · German: Planetenradsätze)	400 N⋅m (295 lb⋅ft) – 750 N⋅m (553 lb⋅ft)

== History ==
The 6R 80 was available in 2009–2017 Ford F-150 trucks (and 2018–2020 only paired with the 3.3L V6 engine). It features an integrated "Tow/Haul" mode for enhanced engine braking and towing performance. For the 2011 model year, the transmission was revised to provide smoother shifts, improved fuel economy, and overall better shift performance. Most notable of the improvements was the addition of a one-way clutch that provided smoother 1–2 up-shifts and 2–1 down-shifts. The transmission has a relatively low 1st gear and two overdrive gears, the highest of which is 0.69:1. This provides exceptional towing performance when needed, while maximizing fuel economy by offering low engine speeds while cruising.

The 6R 80 can be found behind the 3.7L V6 all the way up to the 6.2L V8. Ford has stated that while the transmission is used in multiple applications, each transmission is optimized and integrated differently depending on the engine it is mated to. The 6R 80 features "Filled for Life" low viscosity synthetic transmission fluid (MERCON LV), though a fluid flush is recommended at 150,000 mi (241,000 km) if your truck falls under the classification of "Severe Duty" operation. The transmission, as used in the Ford F-150, has a fluid capacity of 13.1 US qt (12.4 L) and weighs 215 lb (98 kg).

== Planetary gearset concept ==
=== Improved fuel economy ===
The main objective in replacing the predecessor model was to improve vehicle fuel economy with extra speeds and a wider gear span to allow the engine speed level to be lowered (downspeeding), which is a decisive factor in improving energy efficiency and thus reducing fuel consumption. In addition, the lower engine speed level improves the noise-vibration-harshness comfort and the exterior noise is reduced. It has a torque converter lock-up for all 6 forward gears, which can be fully disengage when stationary, largely closing the fuel efficiency gap between vehicles with automatic and manual transmissions.

=== Reduced manufacturing complexity ===
In order to avoid a further increase in manufacturing complexity while expanding the number of gear ratios, ZF switched from the conventional design method—in which the planetary gearset concept was limited to a purely serial or in-line power flow—to a more modern design method that utilizes a planetary gearset concept with combined parallel and serial power flow. This was only possible thanks to computer-aided design and has resulted in a globally patented gearset concept. The 6R is based on the 6HP from ZF, which was the first transmission designed according to this new paradigm. After gaining additional gear ratios only with additional components, this time the number of components has to decrease while the number of ratios still increase. The resulting progress is reflected in a much better ratio of the number of gears to the number of components used compared to existing layouts.

=== Quality ===
The ratios of the 6 gears are nicely evenly distributed in all versions. Exceptions are the large step from 1st to 2nd gear and the almost geometric steps from 3rd to 4th to 5th gear. They cannot be eliminated without affecting all other gears. As the large step is shifted due to the large span to a lower speed range than with conventional gearboxes, it is less significant. As the gear steps are smaller overall due to the additional gear(s), the geometric gear steps are still smaller than the corresponding gear steps of conventional gearboxes. Overall, therefore, the weaknesses are not overly significant. As the selected gearset concept saves up to 2 components compared to 5-speed transmissions, the advantages clearly outweigh the disadvantages.

The layout brings the ability to shift in a non-sequential manner – going from gear 6 to gear 2 in extreme situations simply by changing one shift element (actuating clutch E and releasing brake A).

In a Lepelletier planetary gearset a conventional planetary gearset and a composite Ravigneaux gearset are combined to reduce both the size and weight as well as the manufacturing costs. Like all transmissions realized with Lepelletier transmissions, the 6R also dispenses with the use of the direct gear ratio and is thus one of the very few automatic transmission concepts without such a ratio.

== Applications ==
Variants and applications
Model	Car Model (Note: w/o any claim of completeness)
6R 60	2006–2008 Ford Explorer/Mercury Mountaineer w/ 4.6L V8
6R 75	2007–2008 Ford Expedition
6R 80	2009–2017 Ford F-150 (except 2017 with 3.5L EcoBoost); 2018–2020 Ford F-150 3.3L; 2009–2018 Ford Expedition/Lincoln Navigator; 2009–2010 Ford Explorer/Mercury Mountaineer w/ 4.6L V8; 2011–2016 Ford Territory (SZ TCDi); 2011–2017 Ford Mustang V6, GT, 2015–2017 EcoBoost; 2011–present Ford Ranger (on 3.2L and 2.2L single-turbo diesel engines); 2011–present Mazda BT-50 (on 3.2L and 2.2L single-turbo diesel engines); 2015–present Ford Everest (on 3.2L and 2.2L single-turbo diesel engines); 2015–2019 Ford Transit

== See also ==
- List of Ford transmissions
- Lepelletier planetary gearset
- ZF 6HP transmission
- GM 6L transmission
- Aisin AWTF-80 SC
