= Livonia Transmission =

Coordinates: 42°22′19″N 83°23′53″W

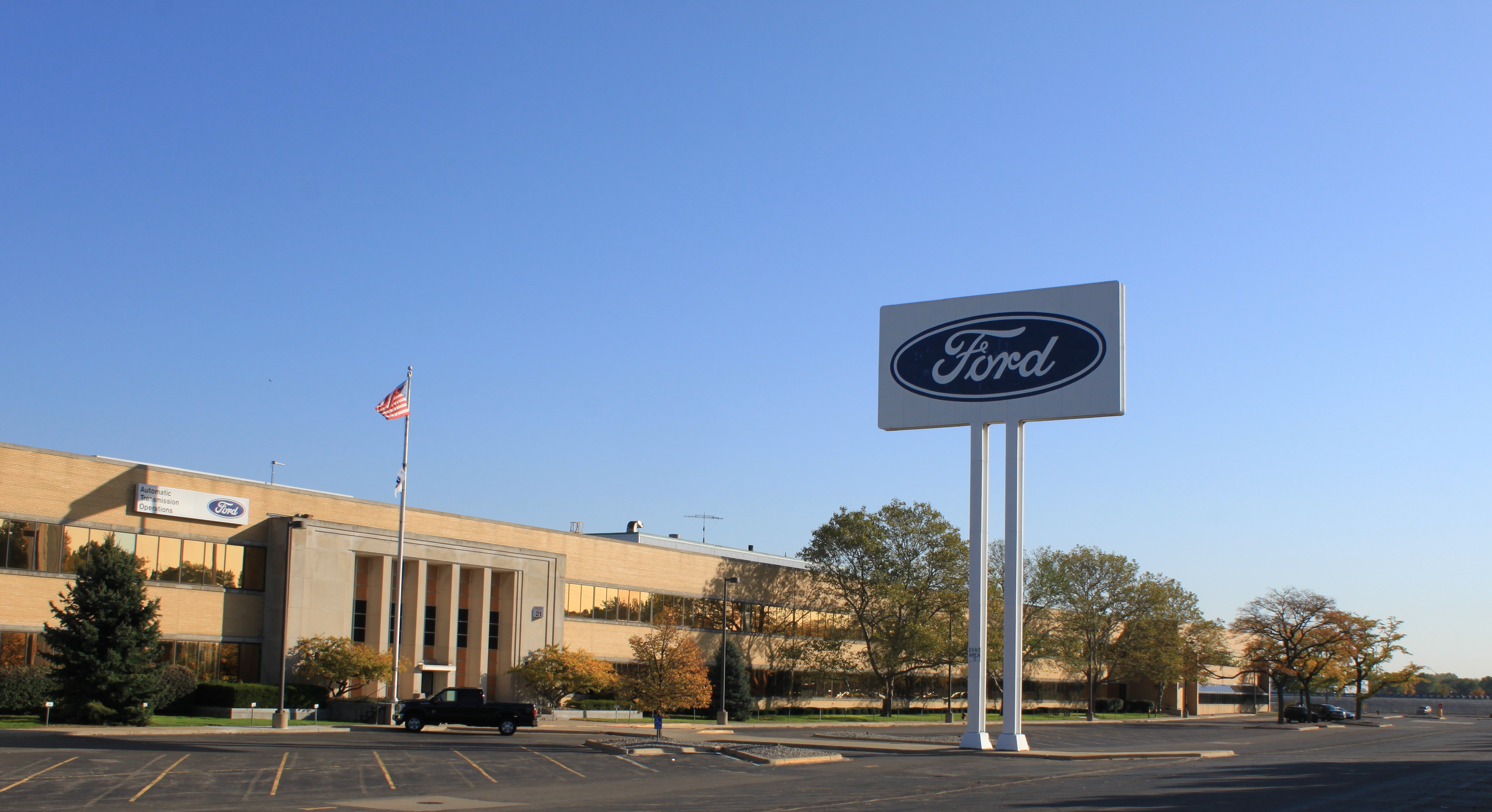
Livonia Transmission plant

Livonia Transmission is a Ford Motor Company transmission factory in Livonia, Michigan. It is located at 36200 Plymouth Road. The plant sits on 182 acres and totals 3,300,000 square feet (310,000 m^{2}) of enclosed floorspace, making it the largest transmission plant in North America.

== Products ==
- Ford 6R transmission
- Ford 10R transmission
- Ford 8F transmission

== See also ==
- List of Ford factories
