= Ford TorqShift transmission =

Family of heavy-duty automatic transmissions

Ford TorqShift

Overview
- Manufacturer: Ford Motor Company
- Production: 2003–present

Body and chassis
- Class: 5-speed, 6-speed, and 10-speed longitudinal automatic transmission

Chronology
- Predecessor: Ford 4R 100

The Ford TorqShift is a family of heavy-duty automatic transmissions engineered by Ford Motor Company for its Super Duty trucks, medium-duty commercial trucks, vans, and motorhome chassis. Introduced for the 2003 model year, the family replaced the four-speed 4R 100 in Super Duty applications and subsequently evolved through three principal designs: the five-speed 5R 110W, six-speed 6R 140, and ten-speed 10R 140.

== History ==
=== Heavy-duty applications ===
The TorqShift family was developed to handle the high torque outputs of Ford's diesel and large-displacement gasoline engines, particularly in vehicles intended for towing, commercial transportation, and vocational applications. Its development included progressively higher gear counts, electronic shift management, revised hydraulic systems, and provisions for auxiliary power take-off (PTO) equipment.

=== Less heavy-duty applications ===
The TorqShift name is also used for the 6R 100 and 10R 100, which are designed for less heavy-duty transmissions and marketed as TorqShift-G (presumably for gasoline engines). These transmissions are based on the corresponding passenger car models and therefore differ slightly in gear dimensions from the 6R 140 and 10R 140 models. The gearset designs are identical, with the exception of the PTO, which is offered only on the non-G versions as an option.

== Design ==
=== For commercial vehicles ===
The TorqShift transmissions are longitudinal, electronically controlled automatic transmissions designed primarily for rear-wheel-drive applications. They use planetary gearsets and hydraulically operated clutch assemblies, with electronic control modules managing shift timing, hydraulic pressure, and torque-converter operation.

=== Tow/Haul mode ===
A feature associated with the family is Ford's Tow/Haul mode. When activated, the transmission modifies its shift schedule to reduce unnecessary gear changes under heavy loads. It can also select lower gears during deceleration to increase engine braking, helping reduce service-brake use on steep descents.

=== Power take-off (PTO) ===
Certain TorqShift configurations include provisions for a power take-off, allowing auxiliary equipment such as hydraulic pumps and other commercial machinery to be powered by the vehicle's engine.

== 2002: 5R 110W 5-speed transmission ==
=== Introduction ===
The 5R 110W was the first transmission marketed under the TorqShift name. Introduced during the 2003 model year alongside the 6.0 L Power Stroke diesel engine, it replaced the 4R 100 in Super Duty applications.

=== Five usable forward gears ===
The 5R 110W has six forward gears, five of which are usable. With ratios of 1.09 and 1.00, the fourth and fifth gears are so close together that the fourth gear can easily be dispensed with. So the fourth ratio is used only under sufficiently cold transmission-fluid conditions, allowing the engine to operate at higher speeds and accelerate fluid warm-up and the fifth gear become the regular fourth gear.

=== Key data ===
The transmission has a nominal input torque rating of 1,100 N⋅m (811 lb⋅ft). It was manufactured at Ford's Sharonville Transmission Plant in Sharonville, Ohio.

=== Gear ratios ===
Gear	Ratio
First	3.11
Second	2.20
Third	1.54
Fourth (cold-weather operation)	1.09
Fourth (regular operation)	1.00
Fifth	0.71
Reverse	–2.88

Under normal operating conditions, the transmission shifts through the regular fourth gear. When transmission-fluid temperatures are approximately 5 °F (−15 °C) or lower, the control system instead uses the cold-weather fourth gear.

=== Applications ===
The 5R 110W was used in Super Duty trucks, the Ford Excursion, E-Series commercial vans, and motorhome chassis. Its applications extended beyond the initial 2003–2010 Super Duty production period, with selected commercial applications continuing afterward.

Model years	Vehicle	Engine	Application details
2003–2007	Ford F-250, F-350, F-450 and F-550	6.0 L Power Stroke V8 diesel	Pickup and chassis cab
2003–2005	Ford Excursion	6.0 L Power Stroke V8 diesel	Full-size SUV
2004–2010	Ford E-350 and E-450	6.0 L Power Stroke V8 diesel	Cutaway and commercial van
2005–2010	Ford F-250 and F-350	5.4 L Triton V8 gasoline	Pickup and chassis cab
2005–2010	Ford F-250, F-350, F-450 and F-550	6.8 L Triton V10 gasoline	Pickup and chassis cab
2008–2010	Ford F-250, F-350, F-450 and F-550	6.4 L Power Stroke V8 diesel	Pickup and chassis cab
2004–2010	Ford E-350 and E-450	5.4 L Triton V8 / 6.8 L Triton V10 gasoline	Commercial van and stripped chassis
2011–2016	Ford E-350 and E-450	5.4 L Triton V8 gasoline	Selected commercial chassis configurations
2006–2015	Ford F-53 motorhome chassis	6.8 L Triton V10 gasoline	Motorhome chassis
2005–2010	Ford LCF / International CF series	4.5 L Power Stroke V6 diesel	Low-cab-forward commercial truck

=== Engineering revisions ===
The 5R 110W underwent several mechanical revisions during its production.

Early transmissions produced from 2003 through 2004 used a 20-lug coast clutch drum, an external pressure-switch solenoid body, and a remote transmission-fluid filter mounted along the vehicle's frame rail. Early units also experienced durability problems involving snap-ring retention in certain clutch assemblies under high hydraulic pressure.

For the 2005 model year, Ford introduced a revised 24-lug coast clutch drum to improve durability. The transmission pump was redesigned, and the solenoid body was revised to eliminate the earlier internal pressure switches. The control system subsequently relied on calculated hydraulic pressure rather than the previous switch arrangement.

Further revisions accompanied the introduction of the 6.4 L Power Stroke diesel in 2008. These included changes to the transmission pump, coast clutch cylinder, and filtration system. The earlier remote filter arrangement was eliminated in favor of a revised internal sump filtration configuration.

== 6R: 6-speed transmissions ==
=== Common planetary gearset concept ===
All 6R transmissions are based on the same globally patented Lepelletier planetary gearset. It uses a Ravigneaux planetary gearset and electronically controlled clutch-to-clutch shifting. All 6R transmissions have six forward gears, including two overdrive ratios.

=== 2010: 6R 140 ===
==== Introduction ====
The 6R 140, marketed as the TorqShift 6, was introduced for the 2011 model year. It was developed as an entirely new heavy-duty six-speed transmission to replace the 5R 110W in Super Duty applications.

==== Heavy-duty applications ====
The transmission was designed to accommodate the increased output of the 6.7 L Power Stroke V8 diesel engine and the 6.2 L Boss V8 gasoline engine. The 6R 140 gear ratio span is 5.899:1, with a first gear ratio of 3.974:1 and a sixth gear ratio of 0.674:1.

The 6R 140 continued to be used in diesel-powered Super Duty trucks and selected heavier gasoline applications, including the F-350, F-450, and F-550.

==== Power take-off (PTO) ====
The transmission also introduced a live-drive PTO provision. Unlike conventional PTO arrangements that operate only under particular vehicle conditions, the live-drive system can supply power to auxiliary equipment while the vehicle is stationary or moving, depending on the installed equipment and configuration.

=== Gasoline and diesel variants ===
Although the 6R 140 shares its basic transmission architecture across gasoline and diesel applications, individual versions use different internal components and calibration strategies.

Diesel applications require components capable of handling higher input torque, including different torque converters, input shafts, and clutch configurations. Gasoline applications use different calibration and internal specifications to accommodate the characteristics of the gasoline engines.

=== 2016: TorqShift-G 6R 100 ===
Beginning with the 2017 model year, Ford introduced the 6R 100, marketed as the TorqShift-G, in F-250 trucks equipped with the 6.2 L gasoline V8. Based on the lighter-duty 6R 80 transmission for passenger cars, it offered an alternative to the heavier 6R 140 in selected gasoline applications.

=== Gear ratios ===
Gear	Ratio	
Gear	6R 100	6R 140
First	4.171	3.974
Second	2.340	2.318
Third	1.521	1.516
Fourth	1 143	1.149
Fifth	0.867	0.858
Sixth	0.691	0.674
Reverse	–3.403	–3.128

=== Applications ===
Unlike the 5R 110W, which was gradually phased out of most Super Duty applications, the 6R 140 became the principal transmission for Ford's heavier commercial gasoline and diesel vehicles. Its applications subsequently expanded to medium-duty trucks, E-Series cutaway chassis, and motorhome platforms.

Model years	Vehicle	Engine	Application details
2011–2019	Ford F-250, F-350, F-450 and F-550	6.7 L Power Stroke V8 diesel	Super Duty pickup and chassis cab
2011–2016	Ford F-250 and F-350	6.2 L Boss V8 gasoline	Super Duty pickup and chassis cab
2017–2019	Ford F-350	6.2 L Boss V8 gasoline	Heavy-duty gasoline application; F-250 gasoline models transitioned to the 6R 100
2016–2019	Ford F-450 and F-550	6.8 L Triton V10 gasoline	Chassis cab
2013–2015	Ford F-650 and Ford F-750	6.8 L Triton V10 gasoline	Medium-duty commercial truck
2016–2023	Ford F-650 and F-750	6.7 L Power Stroke diesel / 6.8 L Triton V10 gasoline	Medium-duty commercial truck
2016–2025	Ford E-350 and E-450	6.8 L Triton V10 gasoline	Cutaway and stripped chassis
2020–present	Ford E-350 and E-450	7.3 L Godzilla V8 gasoline	Cutaway and stripped chassis
2020–present	Ford F-53 and Ford F-59 chassis	7.3 L Godzilla V8 gasoline	Motorhome and commercial stripped chassis
2024–present	Ford F-650 and F-750	7.3 L gasoline V8	Medium-duty commercial truck

== 10R: 10-speed transmissions ==
=== Common planetary gearset concept ===
All 10R transmissions are based on the same globally patented planetary gearset concept. They use four planetary gearsets and six clutch and brake elements to provide ten forward speeds. It is the same gearset concept used for passenger cars.

=== 2019: 10R 140 ===
==== Introduction ====
The 10R 140, marketed as the TorqShift 10, debuted for the 2020 model year in the Ford Super Duty lineup. It replaced the 6R 140 in the pickup and chassis cab applications that transitioned to Ford's ten-speed heavy-duty transmission.

==== Key data ====
The 10R 140 was developed independently of Ford's lighter-duty ten-speed transmissions for passenger cars. It features a 7.299:1 ratio spread and three overdrive gears. Its seventh gear is direct drive, while eighth, ninth, and tenth gears progressively reduce engine speed during highway operation.

==== Power take-off (PTO) ====
The 10R 140 also incorporates a ten-bolt PTO provision for auxiliary commercial equipment and is designed to accommodate the high torque outputs of modern Power Stroke diesel engines.

=== 2022: TorqShift-G 10R 100 ===
For the 2023 model year, Ford introduced the ten-speed 10R 100, marketed as the TorqShift-G, for selected gasoline-powered Super Duty trucks. Based on the lighter-duty 10R 80 transmission for passenger cars, it offers an alternative to the heavier 10R 140 in selected gasoline applications like the newly introduced 6.8 L gasoline V8.

=== Gear ratios ===
Gear	Ratio	
Gear	10R 100	10R 140
First	4.696	4.615
Second	2.985	2.919
Third	2.146	2.132
Fourth	1.769	1.773
Fifth	1.520	1.519
Sixth	1.275	1.277
Seventh	1.000	
Eighth	0.854	0.851
Ninth	0.689	0.687
Tenth	0.636	0.632
Reverse	–4.866	–4.695

=== Applications ===
The 10R 140 was initially introduced in the Super Duty pickup and chassis cab range. It subsequently expanded into the F-600 and medium-duty F-650 and F-750 diesel trucks.

Model years	Vehicle	Engine	Application details
2020–present	Ford F-250, F-350, F-450 and F-550	6.7 L Power Stroke V8 diesel	Standard heavy-duty diesel transmission
2020–present	Ford F-250 and F-350	6.2 L Boss V8 gasoline	Gasoline applications before the engine's discontinuation
2020–2024	Ford F-250, F-350, F-450 and F-550	7.3 L Godzilla V8 gasoline	Heavy-duty gasoline applications
2021–present	Ford F-600	6.7 L Power Stroke V8 diesel	Medium-duty chassis cab
2021–present	Ford F-650 and F-750	6.7 L Power Stroke V8 diesel	Medium-duty commercial truck
2025–present	Ford F-250	7.3 L Godzilla V8 gasoline	Tremor-equipped applications
2025–present	Ford F-350, F-450, F-550 and F-600	7.3 L Godzilla V8 gasoline	Heavy-duty gasoline applications

=== 2025 transmission lineup changes ===
For the 2025 model year, Ford revised the transmission assignments for the 7.3 L gasoline V8. The 10R 100 was used in selected F-250 configurations, while the 10R 140 was retained for the F-250 equipped with the Tremor package and for heavier F-350 and larger applications.

The 10R 140 continued to be used with the 6.7 L Power Stroke diesel across the Super Duty range. The distinction between the two transmissions reflects Ford's use of different transmission capacities for different vehicle weight classes and engine configurations.

== Comparison ==
Specification	5R 110W	6R 100	6R 140	10R 100	10R 140
Introduction	2002	2016	2010	2022	2019
Forward speeds (marketed)	5	6		10	
Physical forward ratios	6			10	
First gear	3.11	4.171	3.974	4.696	4.615
Direct gear	Fourth	none		Seventh	
Highest gear	0.71	0.691	0.674	0.636	0.632
Reverse	–2.88	–3.403	–3.128	–4.866	–4.695
Ratio spread	4.38	6.035	5.899	7.386	7.299
Nominal torque capacity	1,100 N⋅m (811 lb⋅ft)	1,000 N⋅m (738 lb⋅ft)	1,400 N⋅m (1,033 lb⋅ft)	1,000 N⋅m (738 lb⋅ft)	1,400 N⋅m (1,033 lb⋅ft)
PTO provision	Optional		Optional live-drive		Optional live-drive
Primary applications	Super Duty and commercial vehicles				Super Duty and medium-duty trucks

== See also ==
- List of Ford transmissions
- Ford Super Duty
- Ford Power Stroke engine
- Ford E-Series
