= Cruise-O-Matic =

Ford "X" Transmission

Overview
- Manufacturer: Ford Motor Company
- Also called: Ford-O-Matic; Cruise-O-Matic; Merc-O-Matic; Turbo-Drive (Lincoln)
- Production: 1958–1981; 1950–1964 (Ford-O-Matic)

Body and chassis
- Class: 3-speed automatic transmission
- Related: C-4/C-5; C-6; C-3

Chronology
- Successor: AOD

Ford-O-Matic was the first automatic transmission widely used by Ford Motor Company. It was designed by the Warner Gear division of Borg-Warner Corporation and introduced in 1951 model year cars, and was called the Merc-O-Matic-named when installed in Mercury-branded cars and Turbo-Drive when installed in Lincoln-branded cars. In contrast to Detroit Gear Division's three-band automatic originally designed for Studebaker, which became superseded by this unit, a variation of Warner Gear's three-speed unit named Ford-O-Matic continued to evolve later into Cruise-O-Matic transmissions in 1958 and finally the FMX-named transmissions in 1968. This line continued in production until 1980, when the AOD was introduced. Like Ford, variations of this same Borg-Warner design were used by other automobile manufacturers, as well, such as AMC, International Harvester, Studebaker, Volvo, and Jaguar, each of them having the necessary unique adaptations required for the individual applications.

== Ford-O-Matic ==
In 1948, Ford realized it was late in introducing a fully automatic transmission to its automobile lineup. Ford initially approached Studebaker to purchase rights to use the DG-series automatic developed by the Detroit Gear division of Borg-Warner. The Studebaker board of directors was agreeable, but stipulated that Studebaker would have one-year exclusive use of the design before Ford could use it. Since the DG was available in Studebaker cars in mid-1950, this meant that Ford would have to wait until mid-1951 to introduce an automatic. The wait was unacceptable, so Ford went a different direction.

Ford Engineering Vice President Harold Youngren, recently hired away from Borg-Warner, recommended that Ford license and build a transmission using a design he was working on at his previous employer. Ford and the Warner Gear division of Borg-Warner signed a contract in 1948 which entered B-W into a supply agreement wherein they would build half of Ford's transmissions for five years, with the other half either being built by Ford or by a different supplier. Because of this agreement, Ford licensed the design and broke ground immediately on an assembly plant to build the remaining transmissions. The new Fairfax Transmission Plant was dedicated in 1950.

The original Ford-O-Matic accomplished two things that Ford's two previous automatic transmissions failed to do: Through the use of an integrated torque converter and planetary gearset, Ford's automatic shifted smoothly without an interruption in torque from the engine. The other was the shifting pattern, revised from PNDLR to PRNDL, which served to reduce "shift shock" when changing gears and reduce "torque shock" when trying to rock a stuck car back and forth.

The original Ford-O-Matic, while capable of three forward speeds, started out in second and shifted to third, with first only being used when selecting L on the gear shift column. However, if floored from a standing start, it would immediately shift from second to low, then shift back to second and then third as the vehicle accelerated.

The Ford-O-Matic was manufactured from 1951 until it was replaced by the C4 in 1964. Ultimately, the transmission Ford licensed to build from Warner Gear/B-W was less expensive to build than the Detroit Gear/B-W unit that Ford had initially sought to license from Studebaker. When Studebaker ran into financial difficulty in the mid-1950s, Studebaker turned to Ford and licensed the less expensive Ford-O-Matic, rebranded it as the Flight-O-Matic, and dropped the DG transmission from its line-up.

=== Merc-O-Matic "Keyboard Control/Multi-Drive" ===
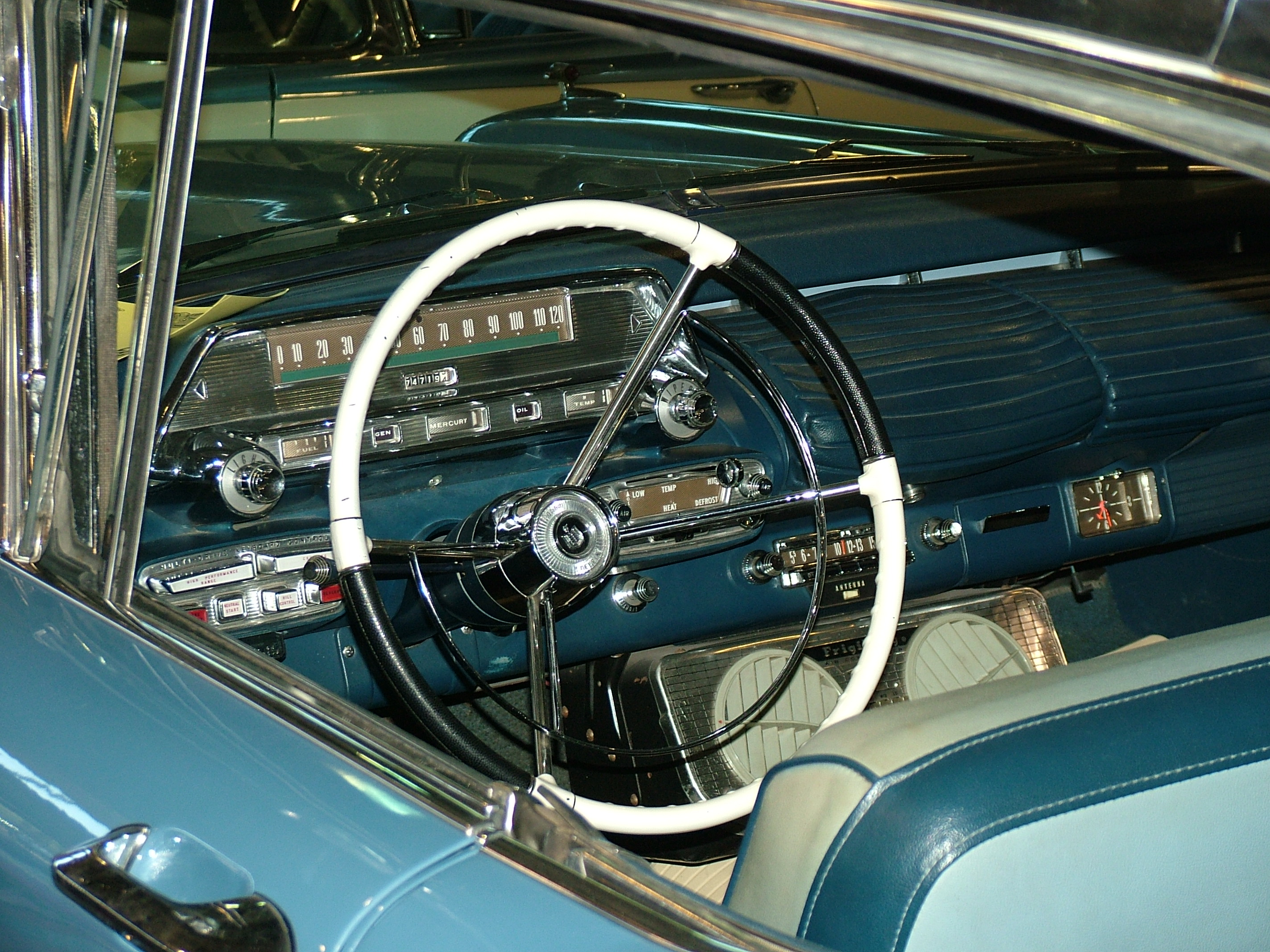
A 1958 Mercury Park Lane with "Multi-Drive" transmission controls to the left of the steering wheel

For 1957, Mercury offered mechanically activated pushbutton transmission controls in response to the Chrysler TorqueFlite pushbutton controls introduced in 1956. The Mercury control buttons initially offered five buttons and was called "Keyboard Control", with a long button on top labeled "Drive", with four smaller buttons below labeled "Brake", "Neutral Start", which would allow the engine to start with the ignition key, "Hill Control", and "Reverse", with later versions separating the "Drive" button to "Performance" and "Cruising" for 1958 and relabeled as "Multi-Drive Keyboard Control". A separate push/pull lever was included below the control buttons labeled "Park", which would lock out the control buttons until the Park button was pulled to release it. The control panel was installed to the left of the steering wheel. In 1959, the keyboard control was discontinued, replaced by a steering column gear-selector lever.

== MX/FX ==
In the mid-1950s, cars began to grow in size, and in response to heavier vehicles, more powerful engines were being developed. The original Ford-O-Matic was used as a template when developing the next automatic transmissions for Ford; in fact, many of the gear sets are interchangeable. The new transmissions arrived for model year 1958, which coincided with the release of Ford's new FE and MEL engines. Although marketed as Cruise-O-Matic, the new transmissions were known internally as the MX (larger) and the FX (smaller). They were a three-speed design using a Ravigneaux planetary gearset like the original, but moved the pump from the rear to the front of the transmission, while also using a different valve body so the transmission would start in first gear as opposed to second. The MX was built in the Livonia Transmission Plant in Livonia, Michigan, and was placed behind the more powerful engines in Mercury, Lincoln, and select Ford models. The smaller FX was built alongside the Ford-O-Matic at the Fairfax Transmission Plant, and was put in midrange Ford and Mercury models. Because the original Ford-O-Matic started in second rather than first, it was marketed as a two-speed after the new three-speed transmissions were introduced. Production continued until it was replaced by the C4 in 1964 in smaller Ford and Mercury vehicles.

== Ford-O-Matic two-speed ==
The Ford-O-Matic two-speed transmission was introduced in 1959. A simplified version of the Cruise-O-Matic, it combined a torque connector and a compound planetary gear set. A front unit (multiple-disc) clutch provided high gear, a front band on the clutch drum provided low gear, and a band on the rear unit internal gear drum provided reverse. This transmission was offered on Ford models Falcon, Fairlane, and Galaxie, Mercury models Comet, and Meteor and Edsel cars with differences in the torque converter, valve bodies, and clutch plates to accommodate differing engine torques.

== FMX ==
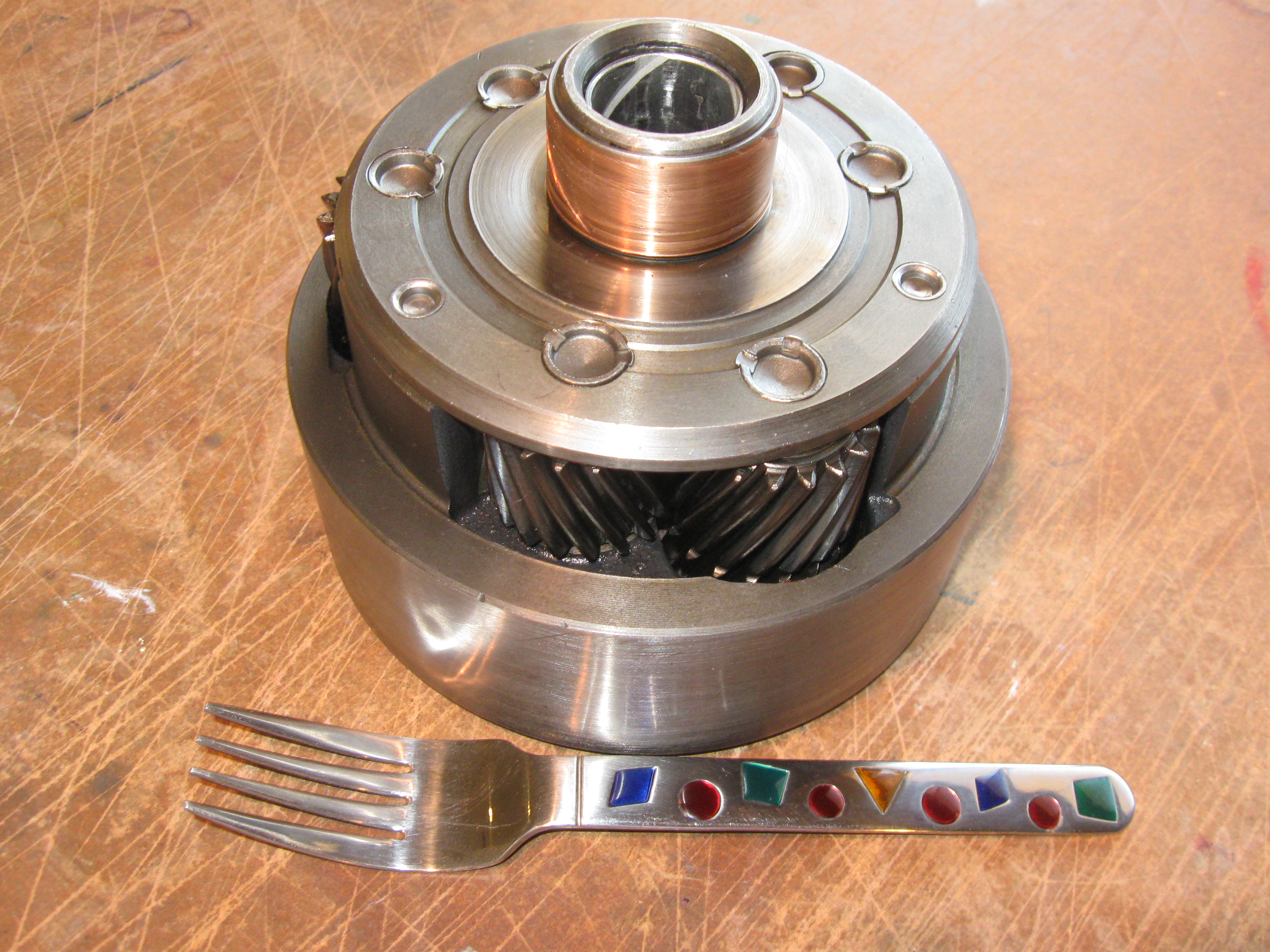
Ravigneaux planet carrier from a Ford FMX, with a dinner fork to show scale

In 1966, Ford introduced the C6 automatic, which left them with three heavy-duty automatic transmissions and crowded conditions at Livonia Transmission plant. Ford decided to combine the best attributes of the MX and FX transmissions and ended up with an improved version of the "X" called FMX. This transmission used the stronger MX-type rotating parts in the smaller FX-style case. This cut down on both weight and the number of transmission components Ford needed to make. This transmission was manufactured at the Fairfax Transmission Plant, freeing up capacity at Livonia for the new C6. The FMX was manufactured from 1968 to 1979, when the Fairfax Transmission plant was closed.

Although the FMX was phased out in the United States in 1979 in favor of Ford's then-revolutionary Automatic OverDrive (AOD) transmission, the FMX was sold for another four years for use in V8 Ford Falcons built in Australia. The FMX ceased production when Ford Australia phased out the V8 engine in 1983.

=== Gear ratios ===
- First: 2.40:1
- Second: 1.47:1
- Third: 1.00:1
- Reverse: 2.00:1

== XT-LOD ==
In 1962, Ford began working on a new type of automatic transmission to emphasize fuel economy and driveability. The new transmission was built around the Ravigneaux planetary of the "X" transmissions. Where many transmissions had a fourth gear added as an afterthought, Ford's new transmission was designed with a fourth gear already integrated into the gearset. Because it was based on the X transmissions, its gear ratios from first to third were the same, with the fourth being 0.67:1. The transmission featured a split-torque application for third gear, as well as a lockup in the torque converter. The project was shelved with a design that initially lacked a damper in the torque converter, but after the project was revisited, a damper ultimately made its way into the final design before the Job 1 quality program. The XT-LOD was initially abandoned in 1966, but revisited in 1974 as a result of rising fuel prices. The transmission was introduced when Ford downsized its full-sized line for 1979. Initially called XT-LOD (Extension Lock-Up Overdrive), its name was changed when revisited in 1974 to FIOD (Ford Integrated Overdrive) and then to its final name in 1979, the Ford AOD transmission.

== GAZ copy ==
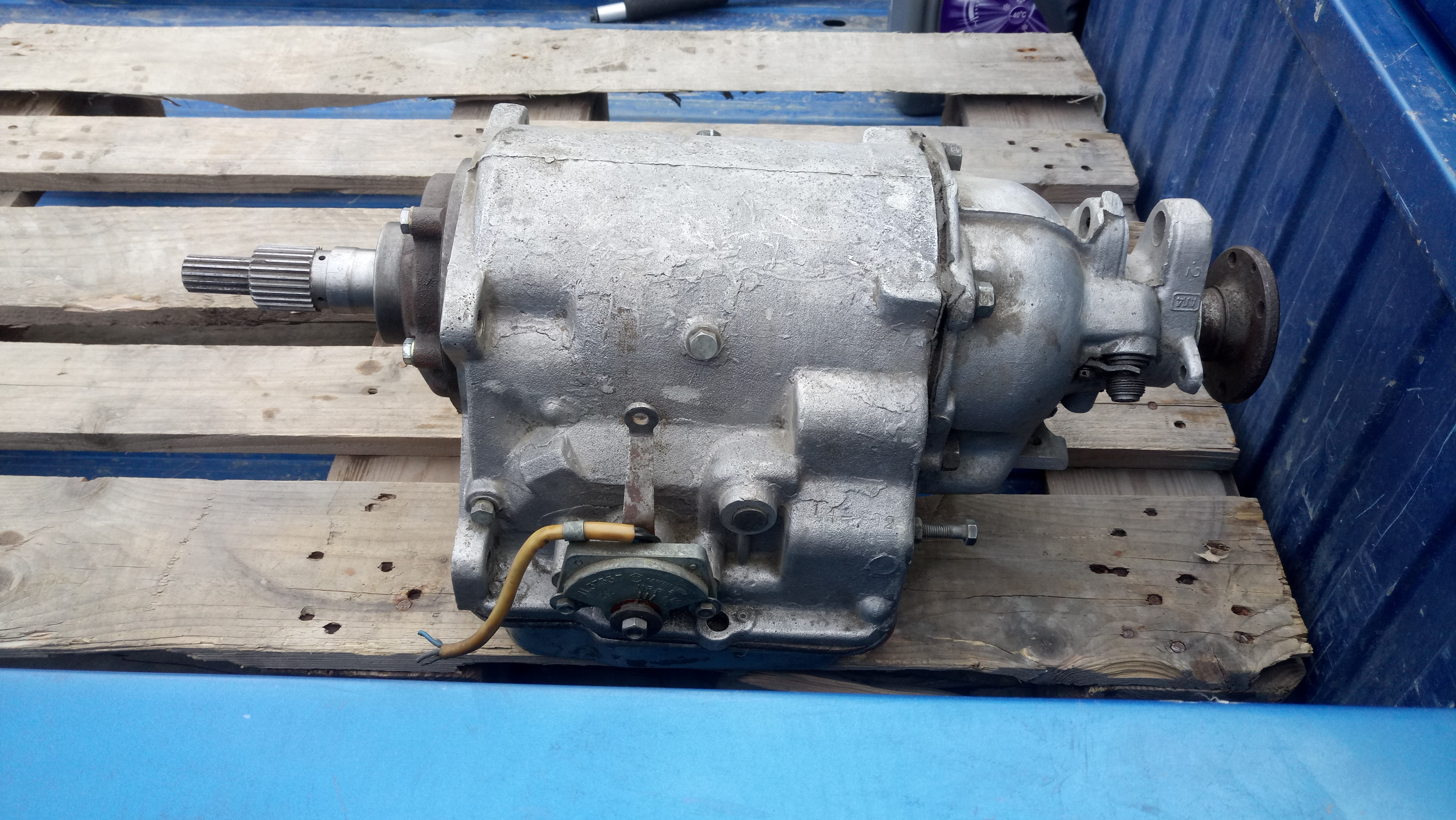
GAZ-14 Transmission

Despite the Cold War, the Soviet Union, in developing its automotive industry, often based its products on western technology, from whom it would either purchase a full license (the GAZ factory was designed by the Ford Motor Company, later the Lada factory was built by Fiat etc.) or make an indigenous copy by reverse engineering. In the 1950s, as the GAZ plant was preparing to launch its new generation of cars, that comprised the mid-sized GAZ-21 Volga sedan and the full-sized GAZ-13 Chaika limousine, both vehicles were specified to feature the automatic transmission. Having evaluated many models, Borg-Warner's Ford-O-Matic and Cruise-O-Matic were selected.

Despite very closely resembling the American transmissions, GAZ's copies did have distinctive differences. The casing was cast from aluminium, components adopted to metric units, and gear ratios adjusted. Both cars' handbrake actuated a central drum between the housing and the drive shaft, instead of the rear wheels. Thus, a parking pawl was deemed redundant. Volga's transmission, based on the Ford-O-Matic, required additional adaptation to the air-cooled torque converter, as it was driven by a 65 hp, four-cylinder engine. Controlled by a steering column-mounted lever, it had four selections: Зх-Н-Д-П (R-N-D-L). In Drive, the car would start in second and automatically shift to third depending on throttle position (the valve was regulated by a lever linked to the accelerator pedal). A kick-down feature was also present. First gear could only be engaged manually in Low (though it could be selected when the car was in motion, and would shift only when the speed dropped accordingly to prevent over-reving the motor) and was used for engine braking or rapid starts. Gear ratios were 2.4:1 for the torque converter, 2.84:1 for first gear, 1.68:1 for second, third was direct (1:1), and reverse was 1.72:1.

Chaika's Cruise-O-Matic copy required fewer adaptations, as it was matched to a 195 hp V8 engine. The transmission was controlled by a dial-button panel with four selections: Зх, Н, Д, Т corresponding to Reverse, Neutral, Drive, and "Braking". In Drive, the car would start in first, and sequentially shift to third and back. In "Braking" (i.e. engine braking), third gear would be locked out, and the first gear would be engaged by the rear band immobilising the planetary carrier, rather than allowing freewheeling from the one-way sprag clutch (absent on Volga's transmission). The more powerful engine and thus torque required a liquid cooling system. Gear ratios were identical to GAZ-21, except for the torque converter, which had a maximum multiplication of 2.5:1.

These transmissions debuted in 1958 and 1959, respectively. Initially, all of the privately owned Volgas were planned to be produced with the automatic, whilst a more spartan-trimmed taxi version featured the three-speed manual. However, most of these cars were given as prizes to workers of distant regions for excellent results, instead of being kept in large cities, where they would be most appreciated. The "lucky" customers had great difficulty in obtaining adequate spare parts, qualified service, and most of all, transmission fluid. As a result, many chose to simply convert their transmission to the common three-speed manual (which was a common universal model used in the GAZ-69 jeep and Volga's predecessor, the GAZ-M20 Pobeda). Although the option was formally discontinued in 1964, most of the 700 cars were produced in the 1958 model year. As of 2017, only six such survivors were known to exist.

Chaikas, were available only with this transmission, and in 1962, it received a slight upgrade in number of friction clutch pairs and the pistons. Never available for private ownership, the car was produced in small scale all the way until 1981. In 1963, GAZ introduced the Soviet type of a KGB Q-car, the GAZ-23, by transplanting the large V8 engine and the powertrain of the Chaika into the unibody Volga. This car was used as a motorcade escort by the KGB's ninth directive (responsible for personal security of the party leadership), as well as surveillance teams of the 7th directorate.

In 1970, GAZ-21 Volga was replaced by GAZ-24, and the V8 adoption followed soon, dubbed GAZ-24-24. As the sedan's standard gearbox was now a four-on-the-floor manual, the selector lever was accordingly moved to the floor. Unofficially, these cars were called "Chasers", and despite their novelty, the engine torque was disproportional to the chassis ability. This meant a low service life and also required very professional driving. For concealment reasons, the select indicator externally resembled a manual-transmission gearshift lever, and the cars even lacked a single brake pedal, instead having the "clutch"/brake pedal layout that dubbed each other. The GAZ-24 had the common cord-actuated parking brakes, thus the central shaft brake was removed and replaced by an extension housing to fit the shorter driveshaft of the GAZ-24. The GAZ-24-24 was produced alongside the standard GAZ-24 until 1985. That year, the car got a major facelift and internal modernization, with engine and chassis elements from the GAZ-3102 Volga, resulting in the GAZ-24-10 model. The Chaser became GAZ-24-34 and was produced until 1993.

In 1977, GAZ launched its successor to the GAZ-13, the GAZ-14 Chaika. The new limousine had a more powerful engine, 220 hp, and its transmission was revised. Like for the GAZ-24, the central transmission brake was removed, but unlike the sedan, it now had a parking pin. The floor-mounted selector got an international P-R-N-D-2-1 lettering. Selection "1" now operated first gear only, via the rear band for engine braking, while "2" locked out the first and third gears, allowing both reduced wheelspin starts and manual down shifting, when desired. Despite the upgrade being reminiscent to the FMX, some of the features like the rear fuel pump and brass-lined clutches remained. Gear ratios were now 2.35:1 for torque converter, 2.64:1 for first gear, 1.55:1 for second, third remained direct, and reverse became 2.0:1. The car was produced from 1977 until 1989.

In 1981, GAZ launched what was to be a successor to the GAZ-24, but separated into a separate model and built alongside it, the GAZ-3102 Volga. It, too, gained a "chaser" modification – GAZ-31013 with the 220 hp engine from the GAZ-14, and its transmission, adapted to Volga's body. This model was built until 1996 in tiny numbers, for the VIP security detail only.

As only partial statistics have been published, counting the total number of transmissions built (including replacements) is difficult. What is known is that 3,189 GAZ-13 Chaikas, 1,120 GAZ-14 Chaikas, and 608 GAZ-23 Chasers were built, in addition to the roughly 700 original GAZ-21 Volgas. Between 2,000 and 2,500 GAZ-24-24, 24-34, and 31013 Chasers can be added. Thus, about 8,000 vehicles were manufactured by the plant from 1958 to 1996 featuring a Cruise-O-Matic-based transmission.

== See also ==
- List of Ford transmissions
