= Sharonville Transmission =

Factory in Sharonville, Ohio, USA

Coordinates: 39°16′23.08″N 84°25′27.05″W

Sharonville Transmission is a Ford Motor Company transmission factory in Sharonville, Ohio established in 1958.

Sharonville's heavy transmission product is the 10R140 transmission used in Super Duty pickups. They are still running the 6R140 from 2006 in small quantities. In 2019 the plant was awarded another $900 million to go along with the $200 million awarded to them in 2015 to continue running current product, and also introduce the 10R80, 10R80 diesel, and future 10R100.

== Products ==
- Ford 4100 transmission
- Ford 5R110W transmission
- Ford 4R70W transmission
- Ford 5R55S transmission
- Ford FN transmission
- Ford C6 transmission, preceded E4OD
- E4OD
- Ford CD4E transmission gears, case, assembly at Batavia. Stampings Sharonville.
- Ford 10R80 and 10R140 transmissions

== See also ==
- List of Ford factories
