= Ford–GM 10-speed automatic transmission =

World's first 10-speed automatic from 2017

Ford 10R 60 · 10R 80 · 10R 100 · 10R 140 GM 10L 80 · 10L 90 GM 10L 1000 (Allison)

Overview
- Manufacturer: Ford · General Motors
- Production: 2017–present

Body and chassis
- Class: 10-speed longitudinal automatic transmission
- Related: ZF 8HP · MB 9G-Tronic

Chronology
- Predecessor: Ford 6R 60 · 6R 80 · 6R 140; GM 8L 45 · 8L 90

The Ford–GM 10-speed automatic transmission is part of a joint venture between Ford Motor Company and General Motors to design and engineer two transmissions: a longitudinal 10-speed transmission and a transverse 9-speed trans-axle. Each company manufactures its own unique version of the transmissions in its own factories. The 10-speed transmission was designed by Ford, while the 9-speed transmission was designed by GM.

== Key data ==
Gear ratios (Note: Differences in gear ratios have a measurable, direct impact on vehicle dynamics, performance, waste emissions as well as fuel mileage)
Model	First Deliv- ery	Gear											Total Span			Avg. Step	Components		Nomenclature		
Model	First Deliv- ery	R	1	2	3	4	5	6	7	8	9	10	Nomi- nal	Effec- tive	Cen- ter	Avg. Step	Total	per Gear (Note: Forward gears only)	Gears Count	Instal- lation	Maximum Input Torque
Ford 10R 80 Ford 10R 100 GM 10L 80 GM 10L 90	2017; 2023; 2017; 2018	−4.866	4.696	2.985	2.146	1.769	1.520	1.275	1.000	0.854	0.689	0.636	7.386	7.386	1.728	1.249	4 Gearsets; 2 Brakes; 3 Clutches	1.000	10	L (Note: Longitudinal engine); R (Note: Rear-wheel drive or four-wheel drive)	800 N⋅m (590 lb⋅ft); 1,000 N⋅m (738 lb⋅ft); 900 N⋅m (664 lb⋅ft)
Ford 10R 140	2020	−4.695	4.615	2.919	2.132	1.773	1.519	1.277	1.000	0.851	0.687	0.632	7.299	7.299	1.708	1.247	4 Gearsets; 2 Brakes; 3 Clutches	1.000	10	L R	1,400 N⋅m (1,033 lb⋅ft)
GM 10L 1000 (Allison)	2020	−4.545	4.538	2.868	2.061	1.715	1.482	1.258	1.000	0.851	0.688	0.632	7.182	7.182	1.694	1.245	4 Gearsets; 2 Brakes; 3 Clutches	1.000	10	L R	1,400 N⋅m (1,033 lb⋅ft)
Ford 10R 60	2020	−4.885	4.714	2.997	2.149	1.769	1.521	1.275	1.000	0.853	0.689	0.636	7.416	7.416	1.731	1.249	4 Gearsets; 2 Brakes; 3 Clutches	1.000	10	L R	600 N⋅m (443 lb⋅ft)

== History ==
The 10R 80 was first produced at the Ford Livonia Transmission Plant in Livonia, Michigan, and the Hydra-Matic 10L 80 is made at the General Motors Romulus Powertrain Plant, in Romulus, Michigan. GM's Silao, Mexico, transmission plant started 10L 80 production in 2018, while Ford's Sharonville Transmission plant started 10R 80 production in 2018.

== Lawsuits ==
At least five class action lawsuits have been filed regarding vehicles equipped with Ford's 10R 80 transmission. Several have since been consolidated to a single case being heard in Illinois. The lawsuits allege safety issues due to harsh and erratic shifting, which causes jerking, lunging, clunking and hesitation between gears. At least one case also cites sudden loss of power due to transmission issues. It is also alleged that Ford is aware of these issues and re-designed the CDF hub inner sleeve along with publishing several TSBs related to the concern.

McCabe v. Ford Motor Company cites 38 different NHTSA complaints regarding the 10R 80 transmission. The complaints encompass the 2019–2022 Ford Ranger, 2018–2021 Ford Expedition, 2018–2022 Ford Mustang, 2018–2021 Lincoln Navigator, and 2021 Ford F-150.

Some of the lawsuits have been dismissed or partially dismissed. As of October 2023, at least one of these lawsuits is still ongoing.

== Applications ==
Variants and applications
Model	Car Model (Note: w/o any claim of completeness)
Ford
10R 60	2020–present Ford Explorer; 2020–present Ford Police Interceptor Utility: 3.3L V6; 2021–present Ford Bronco; 2024–present Ford Ranger
10R 80 MHT	2020–2023 Ford Explorer HEV; 2020–present Ford Police Interceptor Utility HEV; 2020–present Lincoln Aviator HEV; 2021–present Ford F-150 PowerBoost HEV
10R 80	2017–present Ford F-150: 3.5L EcoBoost; 2018–present Ford F-150 all models (Note: except 2018–2020 3.3L V6); 2018–present Ford Mustang; 2018–present Ford Expedition; 2018–present Lincoln Navigator; 2019–present Ford Ranger; 2019–present Ford Everest; 2020–present Ford Police Interceptor Utility: 3.0L EcoBoost V6; 2020–present Ford Transit; 2023–present VW Amarok
10R 100	2023–present Ford Super Duty: 6.8L gasoline only · marketed as TorqShift-G; 2025–present Ford Super Duty: non-Tremor 7.3L gasoline
10R 140	2020–present Ford Super Duty; 2023–2024 Ford Super Duty: 6.7L Diesel and 7.3L gasoline · marketed as TorqShift; 2025–present Ford Super Duty: non-Tremor 7.3L gasoline
General Motors
10L 60	2020–2024 Chevrolet Camaro V6
10L 80 MF6	2018–present Chevrolet Suburban; 2018–present Cadillac Escalade; 2018–present Chevrolet Tahoe; 2018–present GMC Yukon Denali; 2019–2024 Chevrolet Camaro SS; 2019–present Chevrolet Silverado/GMC Sierra 1500 (Note: except V6 and 4-cylinder models, which use the 6L 80 and 8L 90 respectively)
10L 90 MX0	2017–2024 Chevrolet Camaro ZL1; 2019–2020 Cadillac CT6; 2020–present Cadillac CT5; 2020–present Cadillac CT4
10L 1000 (Allison) MGM · MGU	2020–present Chevrolet Silverado HD/GMC Sierra HD
