= Ravigneaux planetary gearset =

Type of 3- or 4-speed epicyclic gearset

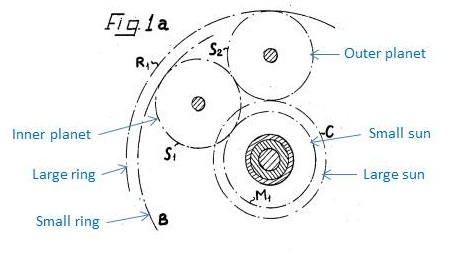
Drawing from patent application shown in black, with annotations for Wikipedia in blue

The Ravigneaux gearset is a double epicyclic gearset, invented by Pol Ravigneaux, who filed a patent application on July 28, 1949, in Neuilly-sur-Seine France. This planetary gearset, commonly used in automatic transmissions, is constructed from two gear pairs, ring–planet and planet–planet. The gearset provides three or four forward gear ratios and reverse by braking or restraining various elements of the mechanism.

The Ravigneaux set has two sun gears, a large sun and a small sun, and a single planet carrier, holding two sets of planet gears, inner planets and outer planets. The carrier is one sub-assembly but has two radii to couple with the inner and outer planets, respectively. The two sets of planet gears rotate independently of the carrier but mesh together and thus co-rotate with a fixed gear ratio with respect to each other. The inner planets couple with the small sun gear and co-rotate at a fixed gear ratio with respect to it. The outer planets couple with the large sun gear and co-rotates with a fixed gear ratio with respect to it. Finally, the ring gear also couples and co-rotates with the outer planets in a fixed gear ratio with respect to them.

== Planetary gear trains ==
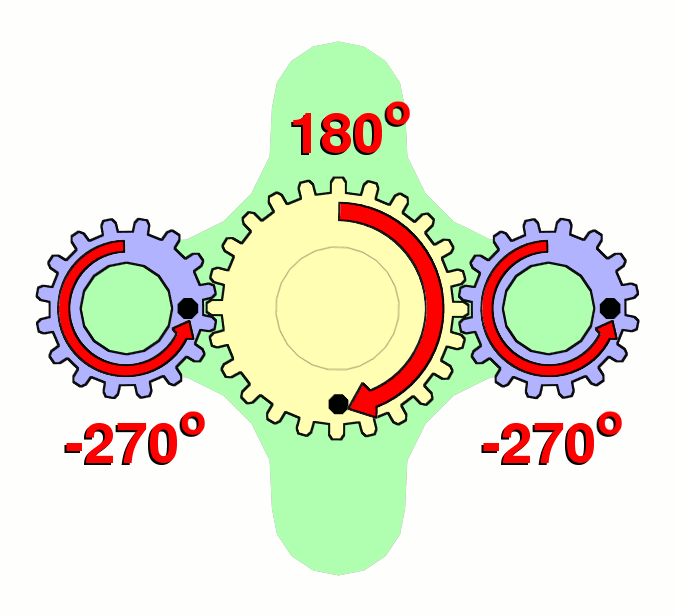
Illustration of a simple planetary gear train, with the sun gear in yellow, the planets in blue, and the carrier in green. The ring gear is not shown.

In contrast to a Ravigneaux, a simple planetary gear train has two concentric gears, one or more planets bridging the gap between those gears, and one arm carrying the planets. Usually, the smaller diameter concentric gear has external teeth and is called a sun gear, and the larger concentric gear has internal teeth and is called a ring gear. The carrying arm is usually called the planet carrier. Planet gears are usually not directly coupled, leaving three components that are directly coupled:

1. Sun gear
2. Ring gear
3. Planet carrier

This provides for two inputs and one output. Usually, in an automatic transmission, one component is held fixed, while another component is input, and the remaining component is used for output. By choosing a set of components for held, input, and output, the planetary gear will increase or decrease speed and change direction.

== Invention of the Ravigneaux ==
The Ravigneaux improves upon earlier planetary automobile transmissions, such as the Simpson, which has two complete planetary gearsets. As originally invented, the Ravigneaux puts two planetary gear trains on a single planet carrier. It has two sun gears, two ring gears, and two sets of planet gears on a single carrier. Using a single carrier makes the Ravigneaux smaller, lighter, and less expensive to make, because the carrier is usually the largest and most expensive part of a planetary gearset.

The original patent application proposed that electromagnetic clutches be used in the transmission. The year of the patent was 1949, a time when pressure operated hydraulic technology was less well developed. Several years later, when the Ravigneaux went into production at Ford Motor Company, hydraulically operated band brakes and clutches were used.

Ring gear B is coupled to planet gears S1, which are coupled to Sun M1.

Ring R1 is coupled to planets S2, which are coupled to Sun C. Planet gears from the S1 set are pairwise coupled to S2 gears.

The output can be coupled to either one of the ring gears, with R1 being used in all forward speeds and B in the reverse speed. The input always drives M1. In all forward speeds torque must be transferred between planet gears S1 and S2, since only S1 planets engage the input M1 and only S2 planets engage the output R1.

In reverse gear the Ravigneaux behaves like an ordinary planetary system, with the second system just going along for the ride with no load. The ratios depend on teeth counts and are taken from the example given in the patent.

gear shift	ratio	Carrier A	Sun M1	Sun C	Ring B	Ring R1	torque transfer
reverse	-0.285	braked	input	free spin	output	free spin	M1 -> S1 -> B
first	0.267	braked	input	free spin	free spin	output	M1 -> S1 -> S2 -> R1
second	0.429	rotating	input	free spin	braked	output	M1 -> S1 -> A -> S2 -> R1
third	0.576	rotating	input	braked	braked	output	M1 -> S1 -> A -> S2 -> R1
fourth	1	clutched to C	input	clutched to A	fixed	output (fixed)	direct drive
fifth	1.5	TBD					

== Ford FMX Ravigneaux example ==
Ravigneaux planet carrier from a Ford FMX transmission

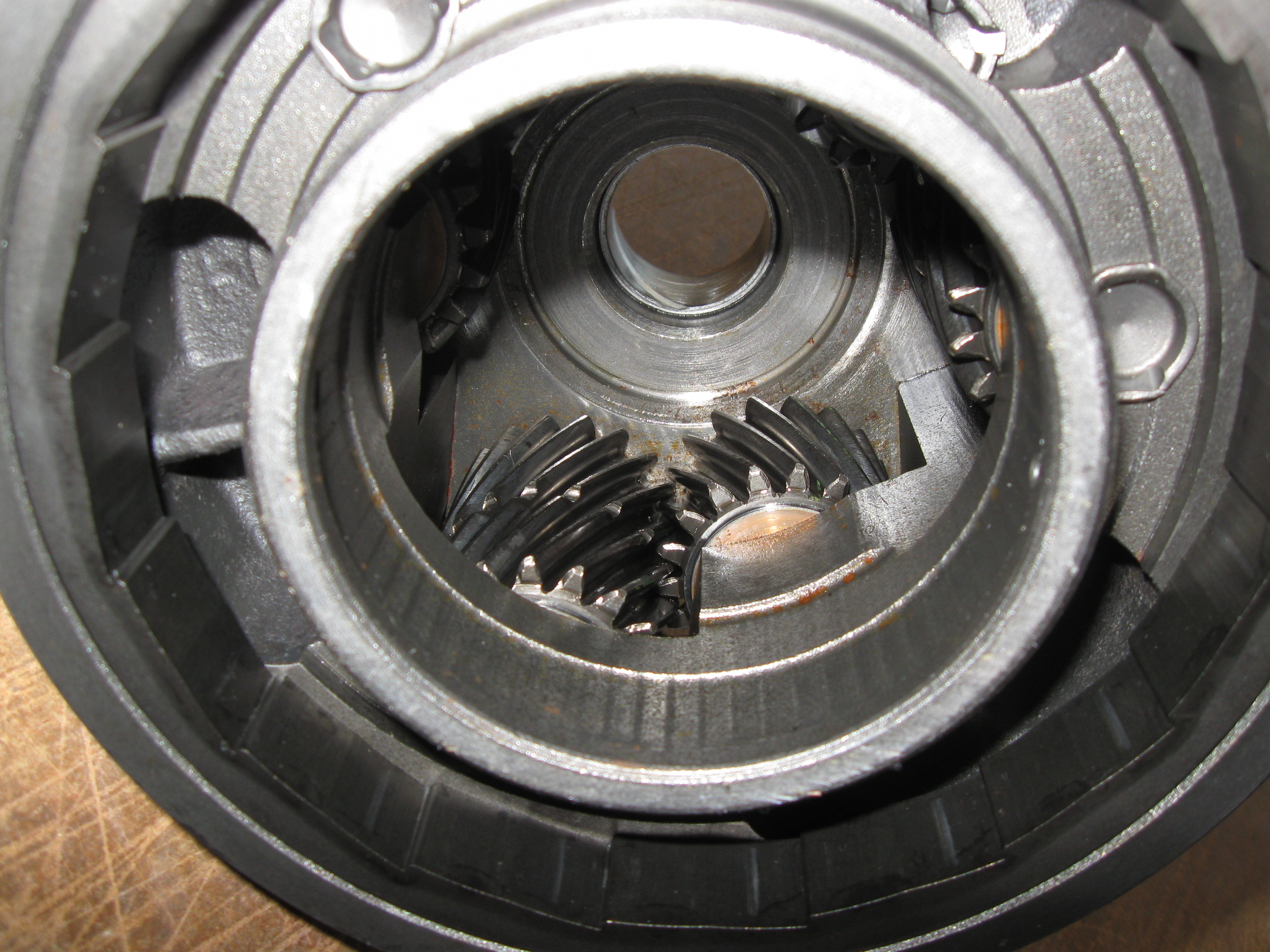
Two sun gears (not shown) fit inside this planet carrier. The sun gears are powered through clutches from the engine. One of three sets of three planet gears inside the carrier can be seen.

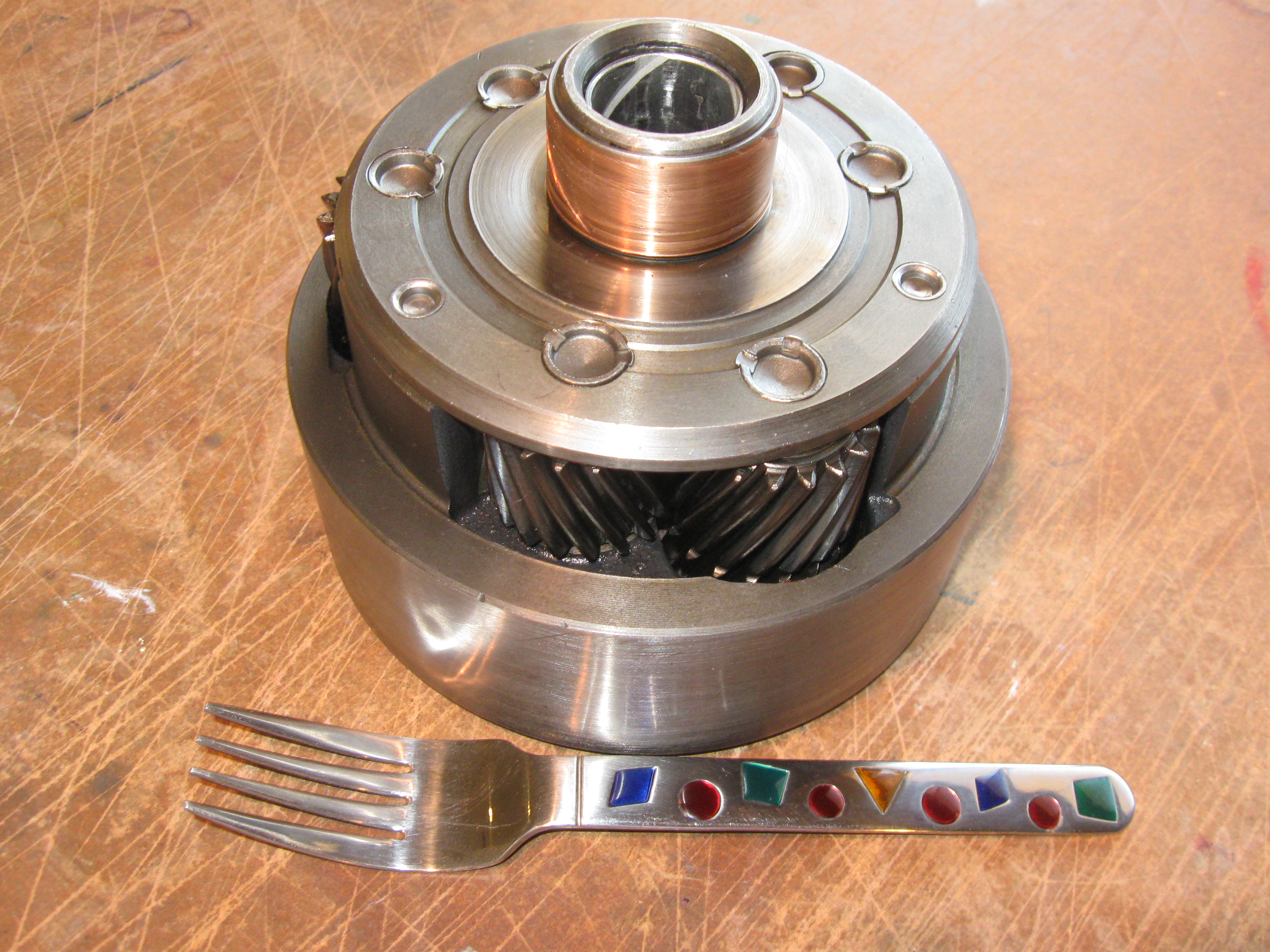
The opening for the sun gears is resting on a table. A dinner fork is shown for scale. An internal-tooth ring gear (not shown) meshes with three of the planet gears. The ring gear turns the drive shaft.

The photos on the right show the planet carrier from a Ford FMX automatic transmission. The planet carrier is the central part of a planetary gearset. Not shown are the two sun gears, called primary and secondary, that rotate within the carrier. Also not shown is a ring gear, also called an annulus, having internal teeth fitting around the carrier. Input power is applied to one or both sun gears, and output power is taken from the ring gear, which turns the drive shaft.

The FMX transmission is controlled through two clutches called the forward and rear clutches, and two band brakes, called the forward and rear bands. The clutches and bands are operated by hydraulic pressure. In this case, forward means closest to the engine. When applied, a clutch connects a rotational component to the engine, causing the component to turn, and a band holds the component, preventing it from turning. The forward clutch controls power to the primary sun gear. The rear clutch controls power to the secondary sun gear. Confusingly, the band that holds the rear clutch is called the front band. The rear band holds the planet carrier.

=== Inner and outer planets ===
A Ravigneaux gearset is like a simple planetary gearset, except that each planet gear is replaced by a set of three gears, all on the same carrier. All three gears in a set are seen inside the carrier in the left photo. The gear on the right side of this photo is in slightly farther toward the center of the carrier than the gear it meshes with on the left. The left and right gears turn in the opposite direction. Only the outer planet gears mesh with the ring gear. The primary sun gear (the small sun) meshes with the inner planets, and the secondary sun gear (large sun) meshes with the gears that turn with the outer planets.

The right-most photo shows the other side of the carrier. Of the two meshing gears showing, the one on the right is slightly farther from the center of the carrier, allowing it to mesh with the ring gear.

In general, a Ravigneaux can be configured with each of the three gears in the set having a different number of teeth, but in the Ford FMX, all three have 18 teeth. Multiple planets, turning in the opposite direction and meshing with different sun gears, gives the Ravigneaux the ability to provide multiple speeds and reverse, with just one set of planetary gears. The FMX in the photo has three forward speeds, and reverse.
