= Toyota Cresta =

Mid-size car

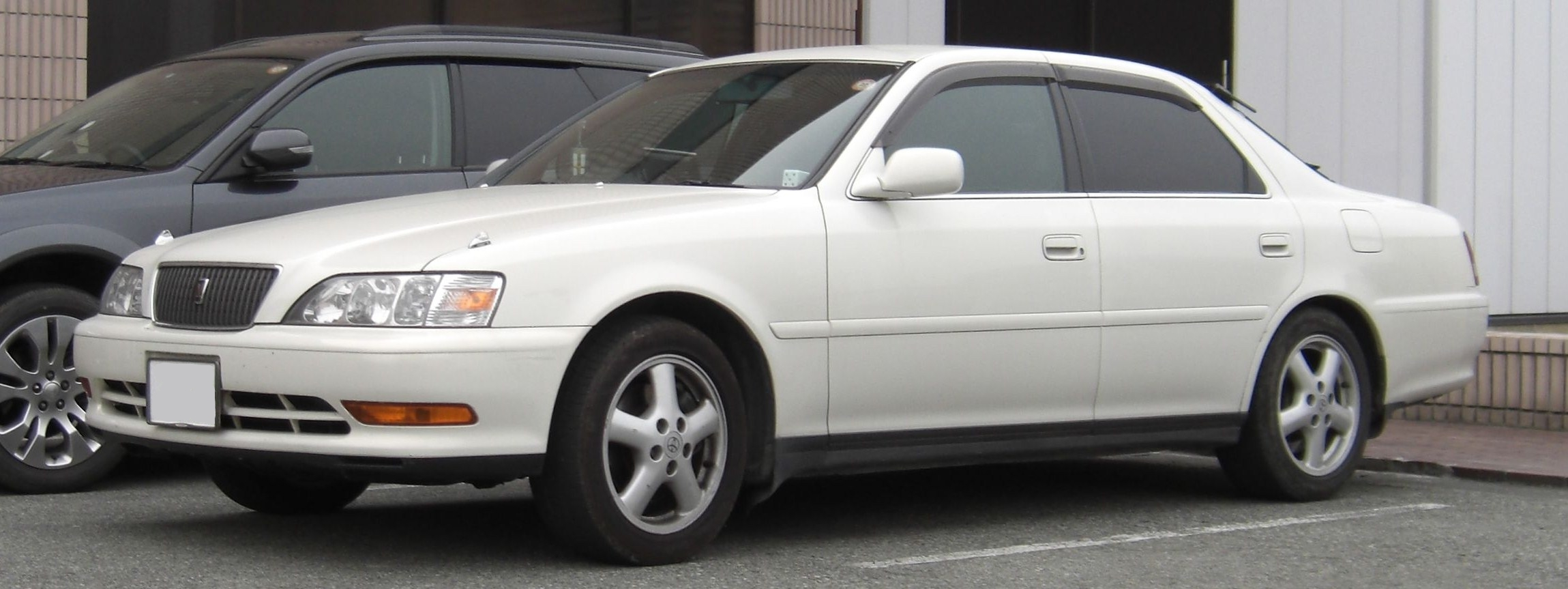
- 1996–1998 Toyota Cresta (X100)

Overview
- Manufacturer: Toyota
- Production: 1980–2001

Body and chassis
- Class: Mid-size car
- Related: Toyota Mark II/Cressida; Toyota Chaser

Chronology
- Successor: Toyota Verossa

The Toyota Cresta (Japanese: トヨタ・クレスタ, Hepburn: Toyota Kuresuta) is a mid-size car built by Toyota. It was launched in 1980 and shared the chassis with the Mark II/Cressida and Chaser and was the top-level car at Japanese dealership Toyota Vista Store. The Cresta was produced for five generations, and production stopped in 2001 when it was merged with the Chaser to form the short-lived Verossa. The goal of the Cresta was to offer a more luxurious package than the Mark II, while the Chaser was the performance-oriented version of the same platform, but sold at different dealerships.

The Cresta's luxury reputation benefited as the series, and generations offered ever-increasing engine displacement. The addition of turbochargers and superchargers to growing engine displacement was offset by the fact that the Japanese government taxed and regulated vehicle emission results. Larger engines offered more luxury, convenience, and suspension improvements as the trim packages progressed.

The name "Cresta" is Vulgar Latin for "crest," which means a plume of feathers or other decoration worn on or displayed on a helmet; the distinctive ornament of a helmet. The logo resembled a Kabuto or a Samurai's helmet.

== First generation (X50, X60; 1980) ==
First generation
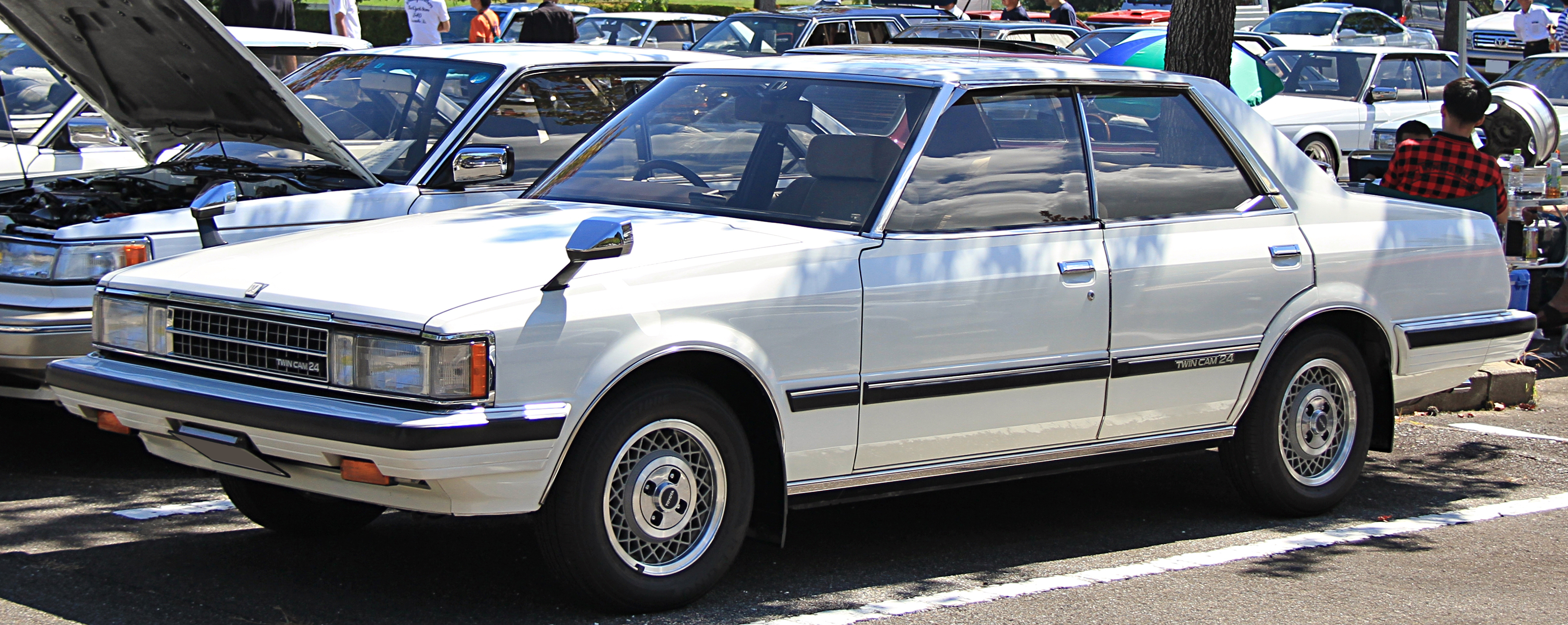
- Toyota Cresta (X60) Super Lucent released in August 1982

Overview
- Model code: X50 (1980–August 1982); X60 (August 1982–1984)
- Production: 1980–1984
- Assembly: Japan: Susono, Shizuoka (Higashi Fuji) (Kanto Auto Works)

Body and chassis
- Body style: 4-door pillared hardtop sedan
- Layout: Front-engine, rear-wheel-drive
- Related: Toyota Mark II (X60); Toyota Cressida (export); Toyota Chaser (X60)

Powertrain
- Engine: Petrol: 1.8 L 13T-U I4; 2.0 L M-EU I6; 2.0 L 1G-EU I6; 2.0 L 1G-GEU DOHC I6
- Transmission: 5-speed W58 manual; 4-speed A40D automatic

Dimensions
- Wheelbase: 2,645 mm (104.1 in)
- Length: 4,640 mm (183 in)
- Width: 1,690 mm (67 in)
- Height: 1,395 mm (54.9 in)
- Curb weight: 1,065–1,225 kg (2,348–2,701 lb)

The first Cresta was introduced in April 1980 and was available exclusively at the recently introduced Toyota Vista Store while Toyota Auto Store sales channels across Japan sold the Chaser (X60). The Cresta was positioned as a luxurious sedan joining the older Crown, which was only available at Toyota Store locations, and the Mark II, which was dedicated to Toyopet Store locations. The Cresta offered buyers a distinctive luxury sedan without incurring tax consequences for exceeding dimension regulations. The Cresta wasn't available in as many trim package configurations as the Mark II and Chaser, so it would remain a luxury-focused product.

The Cresta was introduced with four halogen headlights, and then the mid-model refresh units were upgraded to single units to provide a modern European appearance. The SOHC 2.0 L M-EU straight six and the 2.0 L 1G-EU straight six engines are mated to either a five-speed manual transmission or a four-speed automatic transmission, shared with the Crown. Luxurious image branding was further enhanced when the Toyota Soarer performance luxury coupé was introduced in February 1981, and Cresta's appearance was updated to make it look similar.

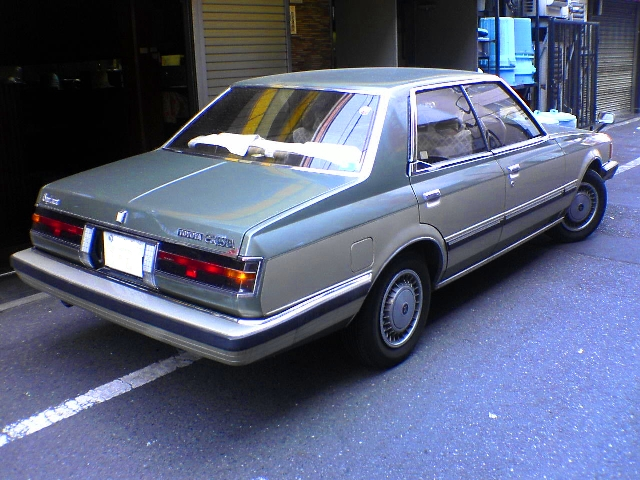
1983 Toyota Cresta Super Lucent

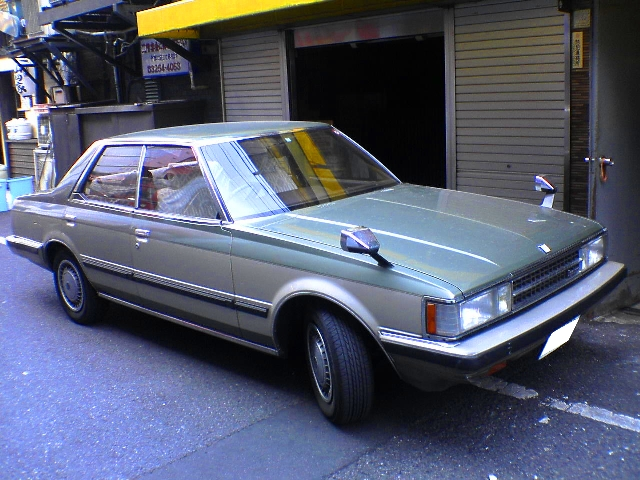
1983 Toyota Cresta Super Lucent

Each trim package offered seven exterior colours, and one two-tone colour choice of dark gray over silver was only available on the Super Lucent. Interior colour choices of blue, gray, or brown were offered, but each trim package had a unique upholstery pattern in cloth, and leather was unavailable. The body colour dictated the interior colour unless specially ordered, and the availability of standard equipment for each trim package grew as the selection was elevated. The top trim package "Super Lucent" is derived from the Latin "lucens," which means "to shine".

Optional items included several sound system choices, including an AM/FM stereo cassette with integrated equalizer, a trip computer, power windows with standard equipped express down for the driver's window, glass sunroof, cruise control, digital clock with an alarm feature, a rear window wiper with electric defrost, headlight washers for the halogen headlights, and three-point seatbelts for front and rear passengers with ELR safety lock-down in case of a collision.

Ride quality and handling characteristics were prioritised, and MacPherson struts were used on all four wheels. The rear suspension was borrowed from the Crown and Soarer, using semi-trailing arms with four links. The Super Lucent, Super Touring and the Super Deluxe came with the 2.0 L six-cylinder while the Super Custom and Custom came with the four-cylinder; a diesel was unavailable.

The Cresta joined a growing list of luxury sedans under the "dimension regulations;" Nissan's competitor was the Laurel, Mitsubishi's was the Eterna Sigma, and Mazda's was the Lucé.

Hardtop trim packages:

- Super Lucent, Super Touring, Super Deluxe, Super Custom, Custom

== Second generation (X70; 1984) ==
Second generation
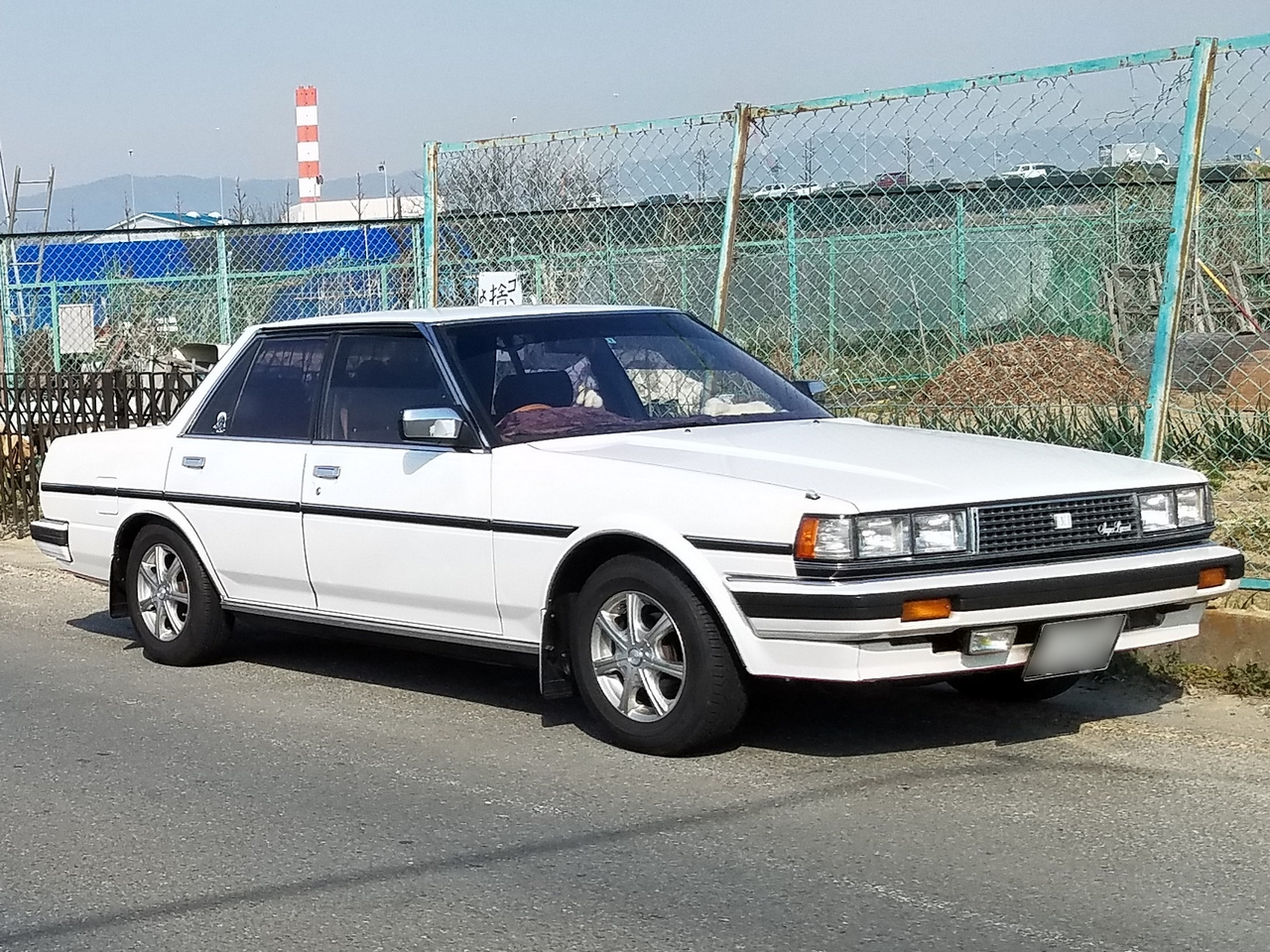
- Toyota Cresta Super Lucent

Overview
- Model code: X70
- Production: 1984–1988
- Assembly: Japan: Susono, Shizuoka (Higashi Fuji) (Kanto Auto Works)

Body and chassis
- Body style: 4-door pillared hardtop sedan
- Layout: Front-engine, rear-wheel-drive
- Related: Toyota Mark II (X70); Toyota Chaser (X70)

Powertrain
- Engine: Petrol: 1.8 L 1S I4; 2.0 L 1G-EU I6; 2.0 L M-TEU turbo I6; 2.0 L 1G-GEU DOHC 24V I6; 2.0 L 1G-GTEU twin-turbo DOHC 24V I6; Diesel: 2.4 L 2L diesel I4; 2.4 L 2L-T turbodiesel I4
- Transmission: 5-speed W58 manual; 4-speed A43DE automatic; 4-speed A340E automatic

Dimensions
- Wheelbase: 2,660 mm (105 in)
- Length: 4,650 mm (183 in)
- Width: 1,690 mm (67 in)
- Height: 1,415 mm (55.7 in)
- Curb weight: 1,380 kg (3,040 lb)

The X70 series was introduced on March 8, 1984, with styling cues shared with the platform sharing Mark II and the all-new Toyota Soarer, with the Cresta now offered as a 4-door, 4-window hardtop sedan with a distinct, creased rear window. The X70 Mark II was offered as a 4-window hardtop body style similar to the Chaser. The Cresta, Chaser, and Mark II would now share a model code for the entire production series.

The X70 series continued to enjoy the popularity enjoyed by the first-generation Cresta. The Cresta continued to be offered at Toyota Vista Store, and visually, the Cresta remained the top-level car, in a role shared with the Toyota Store exclusive Crown, which had been completely refreshed in 1983. The Cresta was marketed for the growing private ownership market, while the Crown offered additional amenities focused on chauffeur-driven corporate ownership and premium-level taxi service. In October 1985, the 1G-GTEU parallel twin turbo was installed in the trim package "GT TWIN TURBO," which was a trim package name shared with the Chaser. Disc brakes are larger in diameter, and it was now equipped with bucket seats, borrowed from the Supra (A60). To enhance pedestrian safety, side turn signal lights were installed above the headlights.

Larger bumpers and a new front grille accompanied substantial changes to the equipment. The early type rear combination lamps were kept with minor revisions. The TEMS installation shared the same settings used in the 1986 Soarer and 1986 Supra (A70). The four-wheel independent suspension was improved and given the name PEGASUS, which first appeared on the Soarer. The ECT-S automatic transmission was new for this generation, while the conventional automatic was installed with upgraded 1.8 L while a turbodiesel engine was now offered. The ECT-S setting was linked to the TEMS setting, and the vehicle speed-sensitive power steering was modified. The 2.2-litre diesel engine was only offered in the Super Custom, then at the mid-model refresh upgraded to 2.4 litres displacement.

Optional items introduced from the previous generation continued while new enhancements appeared. The trip computer was now integrated into a digital instrument cluster, which incorporated the TEMS setting and the ECT-S gear selection to include whether the transmission was in "Normal," "Power," or "Econ" settings and whether the overdrive was disengaged. Six different stereo choices were offered along with simple satellite controls on the left side of the instrument cluster within reach of the driver's hand that controlled stereo volume, fan speed, and airflow direction, an illuminated ignition key slot, power-folding side-view mirrors installed on the doors, fully automatic climate control, and an air purification system installed behind the rear seats. Power side view mirrors were now installed in a western style at the leading edge of the front doors instead of on the front fenders above the front wheels to provide a more modern appearance and retracted electrically for confined parking spaces. The interior colors were now dark blue, dark brown, or dark red, replacing the dark gray interior color from the previous generation. The previous two-tone exterior paint combination changed to pearl white and gold.

Hardtop trim packages:

- Super Lucent Twincam24, Super Lucent, GT TwinTurbo, Super Deluxe, Super Custom

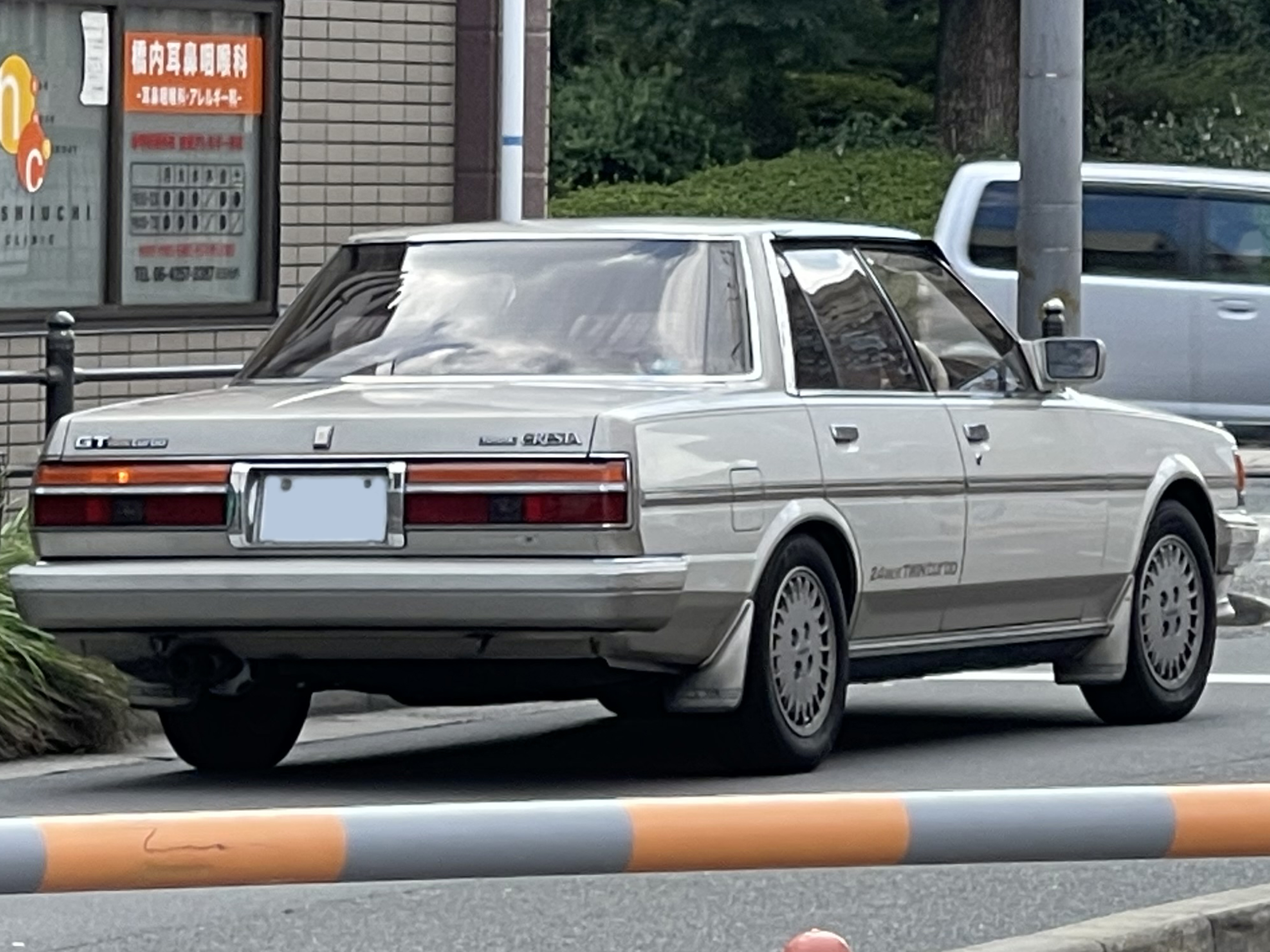
Cresta GT Twin Turbo (rear view)

== Third generation (X80; 1988) ==
Third generation
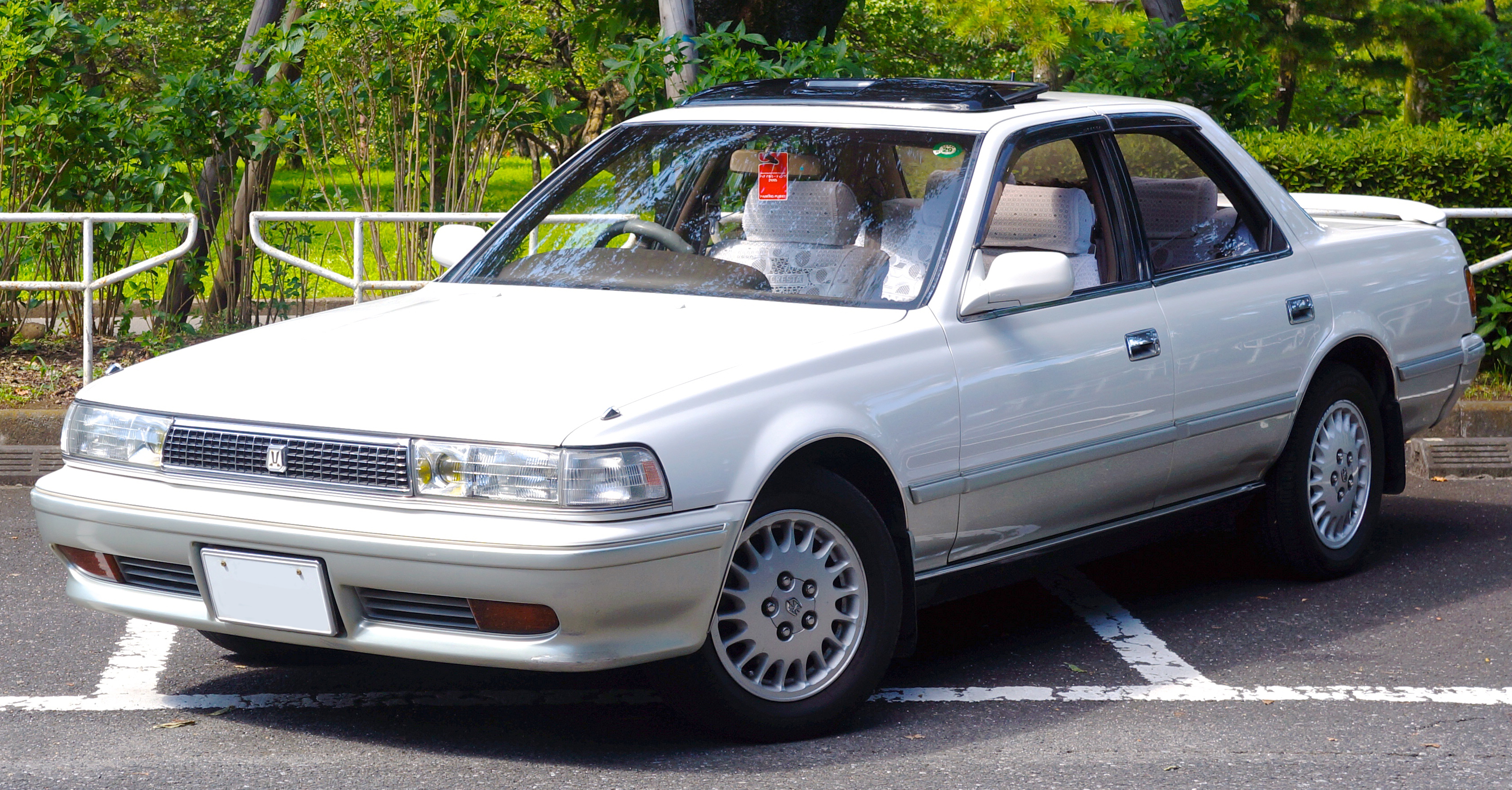
- 1990 Toyota Cresta 2.5GT Twin Turbo

Overview
- Model code: X80
- Production: 1988–1992
- Assembly: Japan: Susono, Shizuoka (Higashi Fuji) (Kanto Auto Works)

Body and chassis
- Body style: 4-door sedan
- Layout: Front-engine, rear-wheel-drive
- Related: Toyota Mark II (X80); Toyota Chaser (X80)

Powertrain
- Engine: Petrol: 1.8 L 4S-Fi I4; 1.8 L 4S-FE I4; 2.0 L 1G-FE I6; 2.0 L 1G-GTE twin-turbo I6; 2.0 L 1G-GZE supercharged I6; 3.0 L 7M-GE I6; 2.5 L 1JZ-GE I6; 2.5 L 1JZ-GTE twin-turbo I6; Diesel: 2.4 L 2L diesel I4; 2.4 L 2L-T turbodiesel I4
- Transmission: 5-speed W57 manual; 5-speed R154 manual; 4-speed A43DE automatic; 4-speed A340E automatic

Dimensions
- Wheelbase: 2,680 mm (106 in)
- Length: 4,690 mm (185 in)
- Width: 1,695–1,710 mm (66.7–67.3 in)
- Height: 1,375 mm (54.1 in)
- Curb weight: 1,220–1,480 kg (2,690–3,260 lb)

The third generation was introduced on March 8, 1988, transitioning away from straight edges previously used by Toyota products of the period and remaining only as a sedan, while the Chaser was only available as a pillared hardtop sedan. Benefiting from the popularity of the model update for the Toyota Soarer, the Cresta visually appeared as a four-door Soarer and used the same interior colours and exterior paint selections. The trim package names used for this series were "Super Lucent G," "Super Lucent," "Super Deluxe," and "Super Custom," and the August 1990 mid-model refresh added "Super Lucent Exceed," "Super Custom Extra," and "2.5 GT Twin Turbo". The Cresta was no longer the top-level car at Toyota Vista Store when the Toyota Aristo was introduced in 1991.

The top-of-the-line model, called "Super Lucent G" had two variants. The base variant "Super Lucent" included a supercharger equipped 2.0 L 1G-GZE straight six engine, while the "Super Lucent G" included the 3.0 L 7M-GE straight six shared with the Soarer. The supercharger was belt-driven but actuated by an electromagnetic clutch so that it would not be driven except when needed, increasing fuel economy.

The top trim package "Super Lucent G" also increased in width, thereby incurring additional yearly taxes due to it no longer being classified as a "small car" according to dimension regulations while other trim packages were still in compliance. Exterior dimensions increased to the maximum limit and now matched the Crown. The Super Lucent G was offered in four exterior colors, including the pearl white with gold two-tone, but only one color interior, while the other trim packages offered three interior color choices and five exterior color choices. The two-tone exterior color was available on all Super Lucent and GT Twin Turbo selections. The cloth upholstery was unique to each trim package but without leather. The sport bucket seats used in the Toyota Supra (A70) were offered only on GT Twin Turbo equipped cars.

All engines were now upgraded to DOHC for improved efficiency.

The suspension was upgraded to a new double-wishbone design for both front and rear suspension, which could better accommodate the optional TEMS electronic shock absorbers, which were available on the renamed top-level trim package 3.0 Super Lucent G. The new suspension was shared with the Soarer including a limited-slip differential on the GT Twin Turbo. ESC anti-lock brakes and the ECT-S automatic transmission continued and were available on more trim packages. To reduce weight and improve structural rigidity, High-tensile steel was used in key areas and the suspension. Five studs were added to each wheel to cope with the additional torque from the larger engines.

The options list continued to offer the digital instrument cluster, front and rear parking sensors, and seven AM/FM stereos with available cassette players could be selected, along with an in-dash CD player. The stereo controls were separated by a second row of switches just above the automatic climate control that performed simple functions.

The 1JZ-GE and 1JZ-GTE found in the "GT Twin Turbo" grades were shared with the Chaser. Special anniversary trim levels, such as the "Super Lucent Exceed" trim, were introduced in May 1990, and a body refresh was introduced later that year.

Trim packages:

- Super Deluxe, Super Custom, Super Custom Extra, Super Lucent, Exceed, Super Lucent G, GT Twin Turbo

Diesel trim package:

- Super Custom, Super Custom Extra (turbodiesel only)

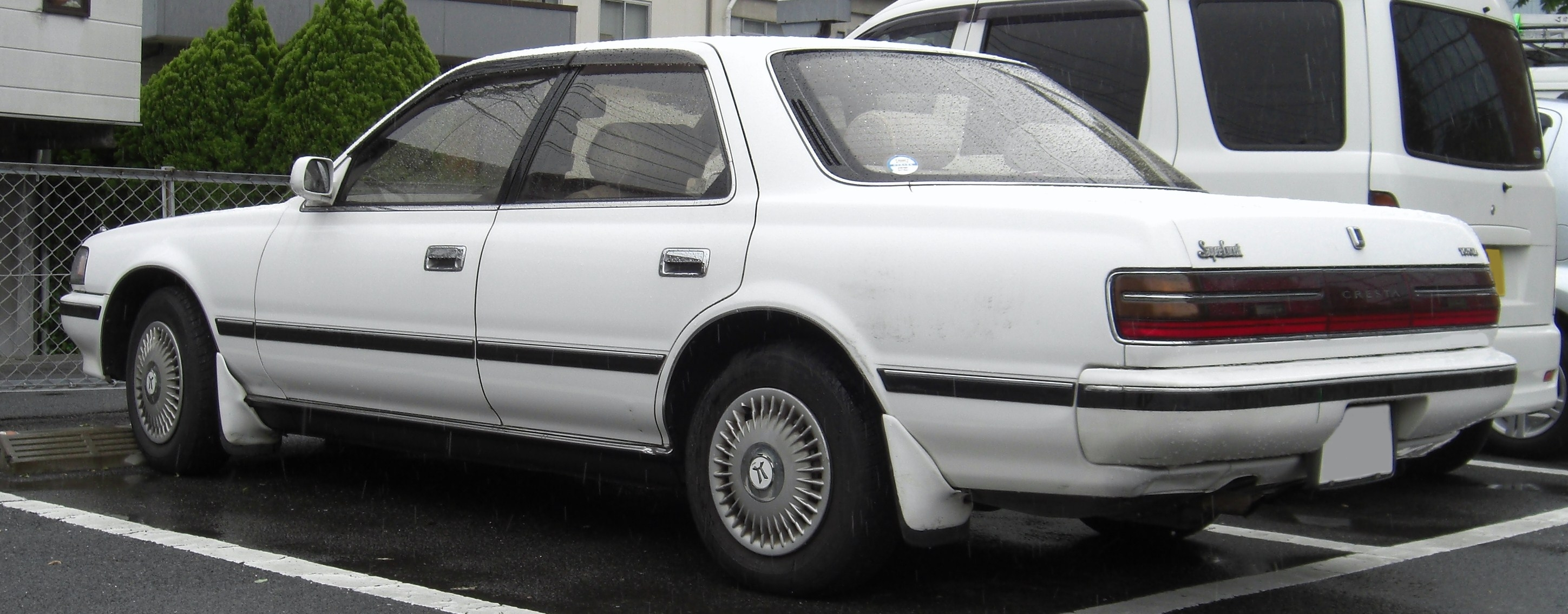
Toyota Cresta Super Lucent (X80, rear view)

== Fourth generation (X90; 1992) ==
Fourth generation
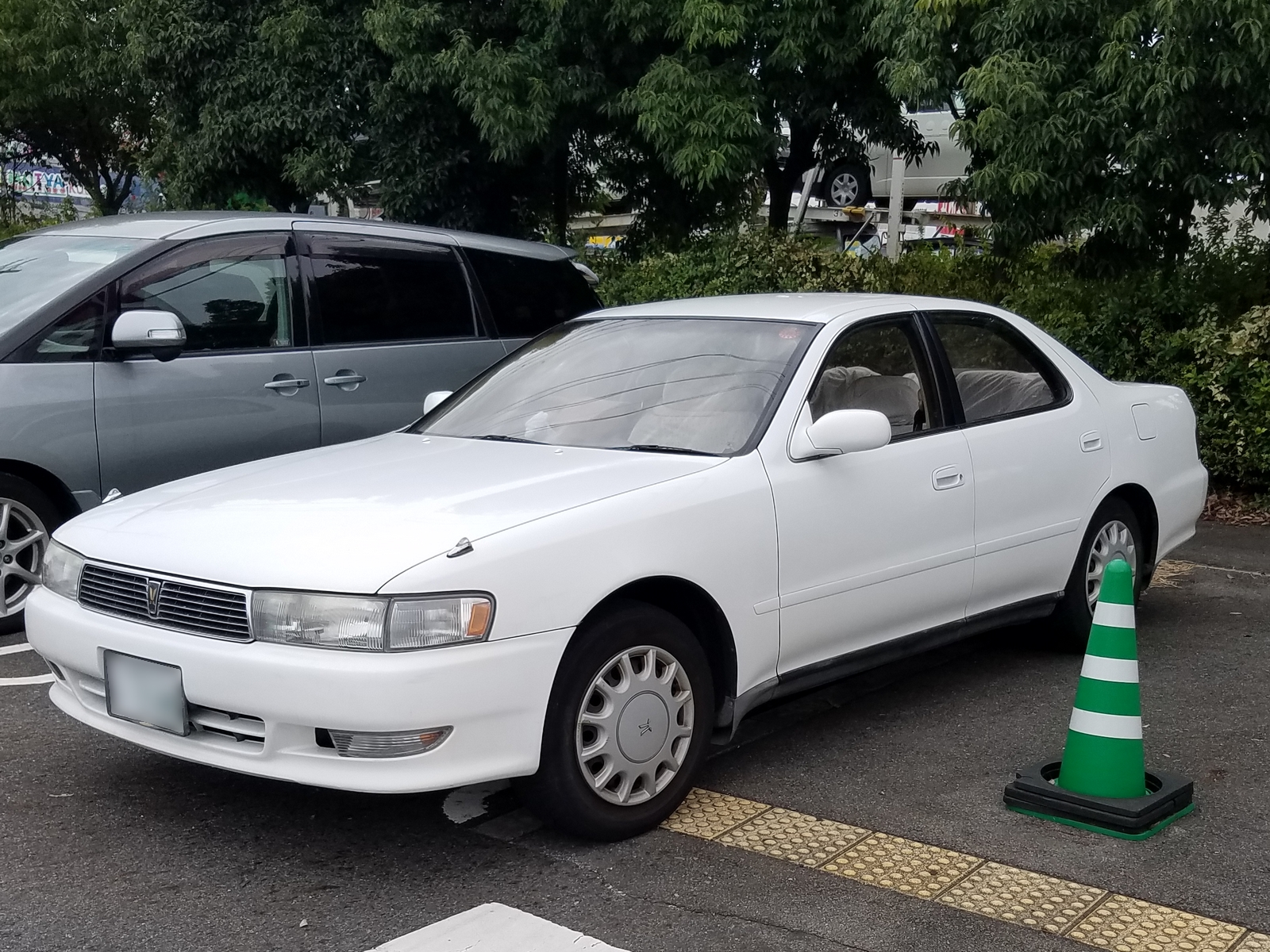
- Toyota Cresta 2.5 Super Lucent (JZX90)

Overview
- Model code: X90
- Production: 1992–1996
- Assembly: Japan: Susono, Shizuoka (Higashi Fuji) (Kanto Auto Works)

Body and chassis
- Body style: 4-door sedan
- Layout: Front engine, rear-wheel drive; Front engine, all-wheel drive
- Related: Toyota Mark II (X90); Toyota Chaser (X90)

Powertrain
- Engine: Petrol: 1.8 L 4S-FE I4; 2.0 L 1G-FE I6; 2.5 L 1JZ-GE I6; 2.5 L 1JZ-GTE twin-turbo I6; 3.0 L 2JZ-GE I6; Diesel: 2.4 L 2L-TE (II) turbodiesel I4
- Transmission: 5-speed R154 manual; 5-speed W57 manual; 4-speed A43DE automatic; 4-speed A340E automatic

Dimensions
- Wheelbase: 2,730 mm (107 in)
- Length: 4,750 mm (187 in)
- Width: 1,750 mm (69 in)
- Height: 1,390 mm (55 in)
- Curb weight: 1,390 kg (3,060 lb)

The X90 Cresta debuted in 1992 with significant styling and mechanical changes over the X80. The car increased in size and gained some new trim levels similar to its sister cars, the Mark II and Chaser. With the introduction of the Third Generation Soarer, the exterior of the Cresta was more visually aligned with the Aristo, which was now the senior luxury sedan at Toyota Vista Store locations. As before, engines were carried over from the past generation without the 7M or supercharged 1G straight-sixes. In 1994, following mid-model refreshes, Toyota changed the front grille and taillight design. Under Japanese exterior dimension regulations, this series was no longer regarded as a "compact car" due to its increased length and width and no longer offered two different width dimensions.

The X90 Cresta trim package names were carried over from previous generations, and two new names were added for the entry-level models. The "Suffire" is French for "suffice" or "sufficient," and the base model changed from Super Custom to "SC." each with their own options and even more specific trim categorizations. Standard items included automatic climate control, side-impact bars in all doors, and driver-side airbag in 1995. The base trim level SC had few options: a petrol or diesel engine mated to a 4-speed automatic. The next level, Suffire, had more equipment, including an optional 5-speed manual.

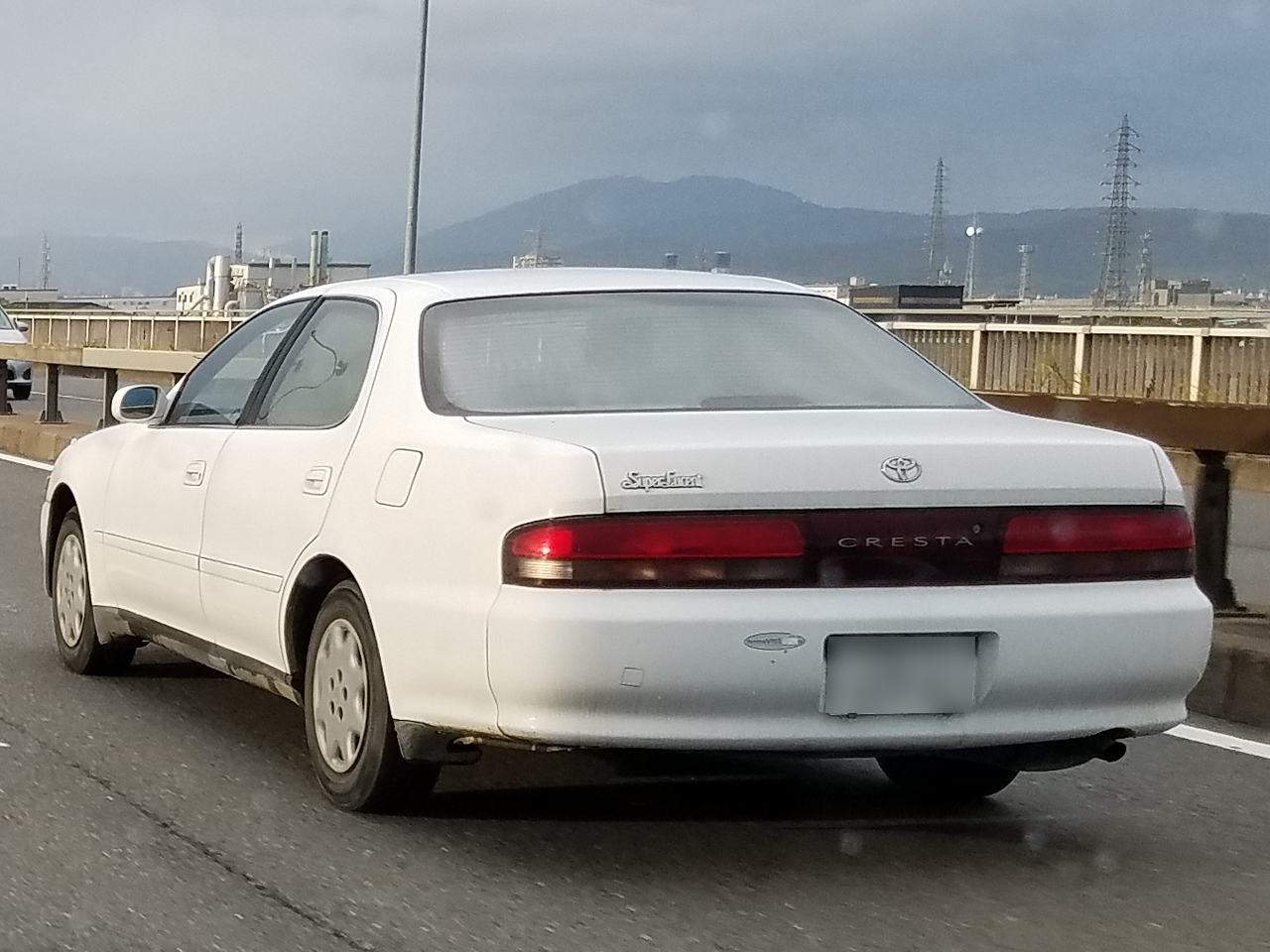
Toyota Cresta 2.0 Super Lucent (GX90)

The Super Lucent however was a much different story: this trim offered 3 different straight 6 engines from 2.0-3.0 L mated to an electronically controlled 4-speed automatic and the availability of TEMS, along with options like a moon roof or a factory limited-slip differential(LSD). Further differentiating Super Lucent models was the "G" package, which featured options like ABS, 15-inch wheels, Cruise control, Digital Instrument cluster, and leather interior. Permanent 4WD, called iFour was offered as an option during the mid-model refresh in 1993 to stay competitive with the Nissan Laurel Club S. The system typically provided 30 percent to the front and 70 percent to the rear wheels, incorporating a center differential lock feature. It was described as a safety feature linked to the anti-lock brakes, traction control, electronically controlled transmission, and electronic fuel injection, and it was offered on the Avante Four trim package. The various sized engine displacements gave Japanese buyers choices as to which annual road tax obligation they were willing to pay. Supplementing the safety enhancement, a driver-side airbag was now standard for all trim packages. The ECT electronically controlled automatic transmission and an LSD unit were now standard on all rear-drive drivetrain installations.

The Super Lucent G was available with Electro MultiVision, a 6-inch color LCD screen that displayed TV broadcasts, stereo settings, climate control settings, fuel economy and cruising range, and maintenance reminders. This was the first version to offer a touch-sensitive screen, which was previously introduced in the Crown. CD-ROM updated maps, and VICS local traffic conditions were integrated, and GPS location information was used to display the vehicle's position. Four stereo choices were offered, including two different versions that provided an in-dash CD player, along with DSP (Digital Sound Processing) that would modify the sound to simulate different venues. Ten speakers were available, including a subwoofer. Front and rear parking sensors, remote keyless entry, cellular phone handset in the front armrest with hands-free voice dialing, and the first-time leather interior was offered, were all optional equipment.

The Tourer trim levels all featured a 2.5 L 1JZ straight 6, but with a few differences. The Tourer S had a naturally aspirated engine and only a 4-speed automatic whereas the Tourer V's came with a pair of turbochargers and the option of an R154 5-speed manual. All Tourers had front- and rear-stabilizer bars but only the Tourer V's came with traction control, ABS and an LSD standard. Tourer V's were very popular amongst enthusiasts and drifters due to their stiff chassis, price point compared to other RWD/Turbo Toyota's, and power-to-weight ratio.

Trim packages (3.0L, 2.5L, 2.0L and 1.8L):

- 3.0 Super Lucent G, 2.5 Super Lucent G, 2.5 Tourer V, 2.5 Tourer S, 2.5 Super Lucent, 2.5 Super Lucent Four, 2.0 Super Lucent, Suffire (1.8L), SC (1.8L)

Diesel Sedan trim packages:

- Suffire, SC (turbodiesel)

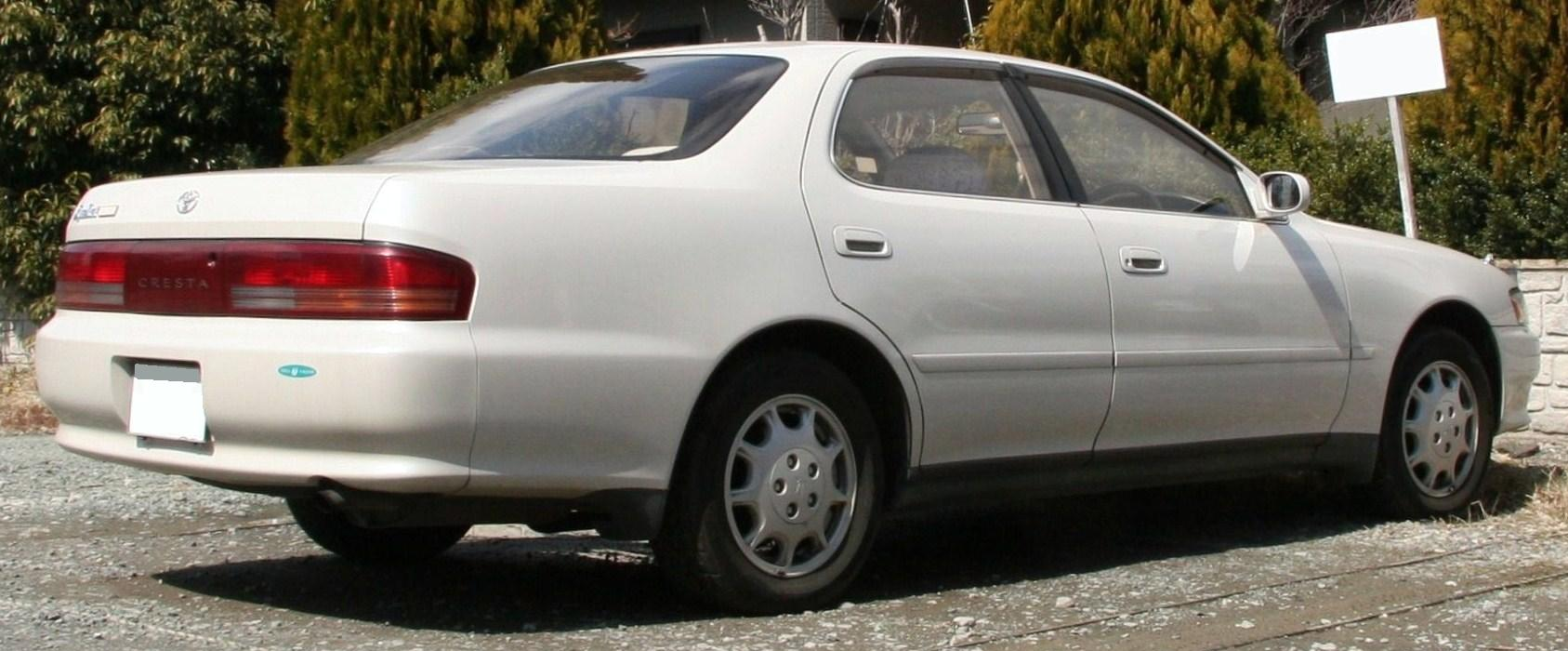
Toyota Cresta 3.0 Super Lucent G (JZX91)

== Fifth generation (X100; 1996) ==
Fifth generation
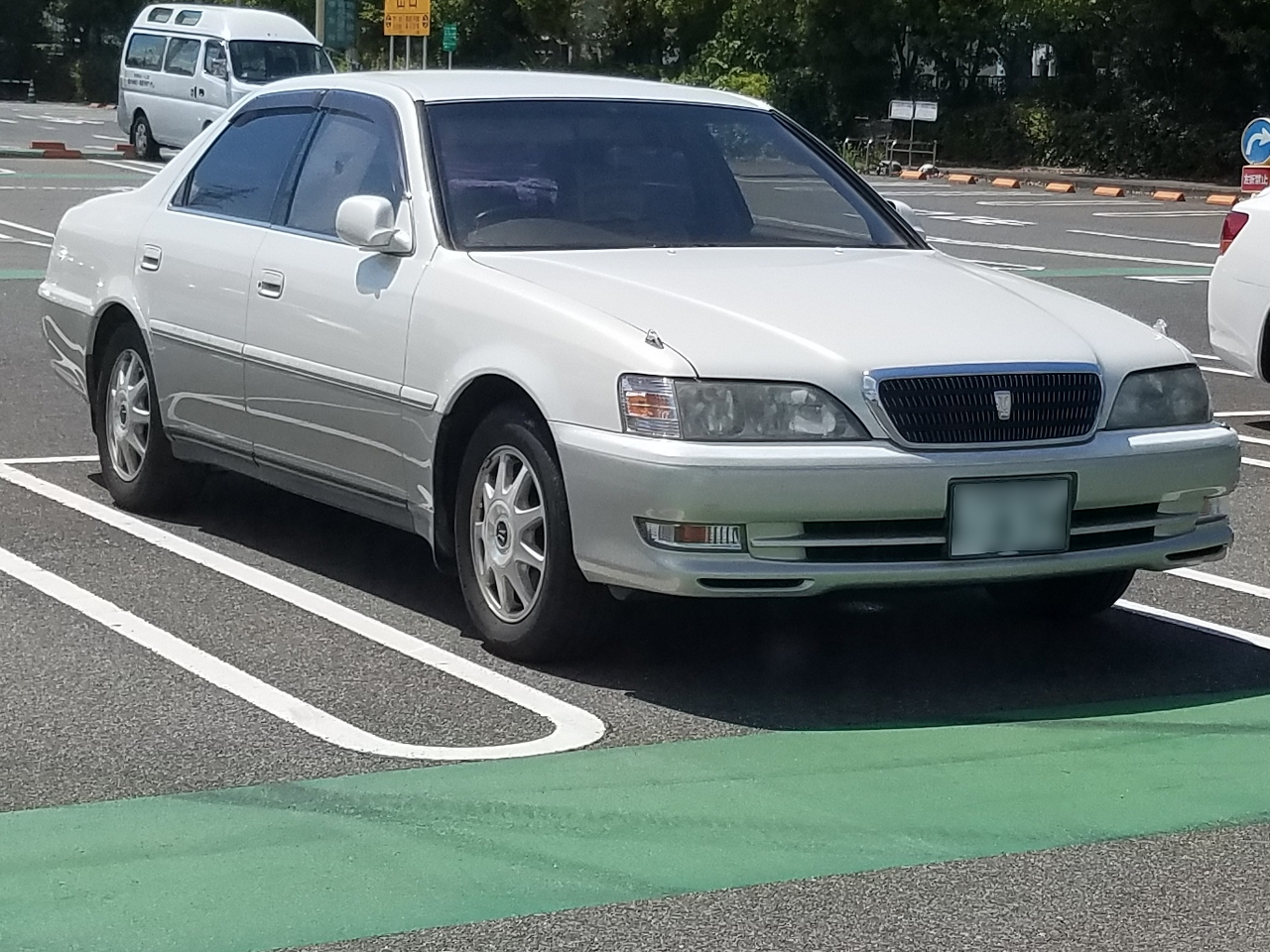
- Toyota Cresta 2.5 Exceed G

Overview
- Model code: X100
- Production: 1996–2001
- Assembly: Japan: Miyawaka, Fukuoka (Miyata) (Toyota Motor Kyushu)

Body and chassis
- Body style: 4-door sedan
- Layout: Front engine, rear-wheel drive; Front engine, all-wheel drive
- Related: Toyota Mark II (X100); Toyota Chaser (X100)

Powertrain
- Engine: Petrol: 2.0 L 1G-FE I6; 2.5 L 1JZ-GE I6; 2.5 L 1JZ-GTE Turbo I6; 3.0 L 2JZ-GE I6; Diesel: 2.4 L 2L-TE (II) turbodiesel I4
- Transmission: 5-speed R154 manual; 5-speed W57 manual; 4-speed A43DE automatic; 4-speed A340E automatic

Dimensions
- Wheelbase: 2,730 mm (107 in)
- Length: 4,760 mm (187 in)
- Width: 1,755 mm (69.1 in)
- Height: 1,420 mm (56 in)
- Curb weight: 1,420 kg (3,130 lb)

Chronology
- Successor: Toyota Verossa

In September 1996, the X100 series was released. Although the dimensions are extremely similar to the X90 series, the X100 series Cresta boasts an extra 90 kg (200 lb) in weight, partly because of stricter safety regulations. The Cresta continued to be offered at Toyota Vista Store locations until they were renamed NETZ Store. Maintaining a yearly update tradition, the X100 series started its differences from the X90 series with an updated front and rear end. The new generation Cresta also lost its previous generation's 1.8 L 4S-FE I4 engine option.

In the previous generation, the Tourer V and Tourer S were the performance grade names shared with the Chaser and Mark II. However, this generation was renamed "Roulant" which is French for "vehicle," and a new 2.0 L engine (1G-FE) straight-six was now available. There was also a change in the name of the luxury grade. The "Super Lucent," traditionally the top-level trim name, was now positioned as a mid-priced grade, replacing the trim package name "Suffire," and 4-cylinder engine cars were now only equipped with diesel engines. TEMS was available on all Exceed and Roulant trim packages. Toyota's iFour was the all-wheel-drive drivetrain. Only the 2.0 Super Lucent offered a manual transmission; later models are all automatic. Since the 1JZ-GTE's turbo version, the higher grade Roulant G does not have a manual transmission option. Leather upholstery, available in the previous generation, was no longer available. The Roulant G and Roulant came standard with the next generation of digital instrumentation called Optitron while the Exceed and Super Lucent models continued to use the previous version. Dual airbags and side airbags in the outer edge of the front seatbacks were now standard equipment. The GPS-enabled navigation system continued with improvements and additional functionality.

In contrast to the Mark II, which emphasizes its traditional reputation, and the Chaser, which has a performance image shared with the Soarer, the Cresta has styling that expresses an elegant luxury sedan. It has sloping and curvaceous bodywork, a simple grille, and a sloping beltline. The overall height is 1,420 mm (56 in), 20 mm (0.79 in) higher than the Mark II and Chaser to distinguish its sedan-like character and a similar appearance to the second generation Toyota Aristo (S160).

Trim packages (3.0L, 2.5L and 2.0L):

- 3.0 Exceed G, 2.5 Exceed G, 2.5 Exceed, 2.5 Roulant G, 2.5 Roulant, 2.5 Super Lucent, 2.5 Super Lucent Four G, 2.5 Super Lucent Four, 2.0 Exceed, 2.0 Super Lucent, 2.0 SC

Diesel Sedan trim packages:

- Super Lucent, SC (turbodiesel)

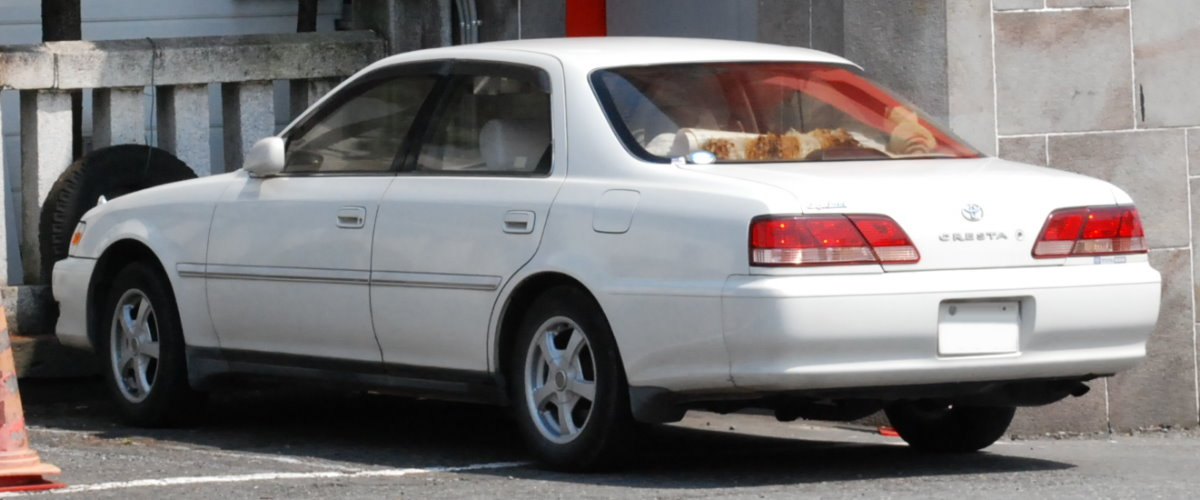
1998 Toyota Cresta 2.5 Roulant

Timeline:

- August 1997 - The "Super Lucent L" was launched. It was equipped with aluminium wheels, a genuine leather-wrapped steering wheel, and a transmission selector handle as standard equipment based on the 2L and 2.5 L engine models.
- January 1998 - Cresta 2.5 L + full-time 4WD model "Super Lucent Four N" is available as a special edition model. It is specially equipped with an electric door lock that works with the door key and four speakers.
- August 1998 - Minor changes. The grille has been enlarged, and the taillights have been changed to a horizontal appearance. The interior has a new seat fabric pattern, and the Roulant steering wheel has been changed from 4 spokes to 3 spokes. VVT-i is also adopted for 2.0 L (1G-FE) vehicles. AWD was also added to the 2.0 L. Roulant was added to the 2.0 L, and the grade name of the 2.5 L Roulant was changed to "Roulant S."
- December 1998 - A special edition, "Excellent Edition," was added to the 2.0 L rear-drive model Exceed and the AWD model Super Lucent Four.
- July 1999 - Based on 2.0 L and 2.5 L engine vehicles, the "Super Lucent L" was launched, which came standard with aluminium wheels and genuine leather-wrapped controls.
- April 2000 - Special edition models "2.0 Exceed Premium Edition G", "2.5 Exceed Premium Edition G", and "2.0 Super Lucent Four Premium Edition G" are available. Equipped with HID headlamps and yellow fog lamps, an in-dash 6-CD changer, genuine leather and woodgrain 4-spoke steering wheel, and side curtain airbags.
- Due to some subsequent improvements, the 2L-TE (2.4 diesel turbo) model was discontinued, and the BEAMS VVT-i mechanism was installed as standard on all Cresta engines.
- June 2001 - Production ended. After that, it will only be available in stock.
- July 2001 - After five generations and 21 years of history, all inventory items are sold out, and sales are discontinued.

== See also ==
- List of Toyota vehicles
