= Toyota A transmission =

Motor vehicle automatic transmissions

Toyota Motor Corporation's A family is a family of automatic FWD/RWD/4WD/AWD transmissions built by Aisin-Warner. They share much in common with Volvo's AW7* and Aisin-Warner's 03-71* transmissions, which are found in Suzukis, Mitsubishis, and other Asian vehicles.

The codes are divided into three sections

- The letter A = Aisin-Warner Automatic.
- Two or three digits.
  - Older transmissions have two digits.
    - The first digit represents the generation (not the number of gears, see A10 vs A20 and A30 vs A40 vs A40D).
    - The last digit represents the particular application.
  - Newer transmission have three digits.
    - The first digit represents the generation. Note: the sequence is 1,2,...,9,A,B with A and B being treated as digits.
    - The second digit represents the number of gears.
    - The last digit represents the particular application.
- Letters representing particular features:
  - D = Separates 3-speed A4x series from 4-speed A4xD series
  - E = Electronic control
  - F = Four wheel drive
  - H = AWD Transverse mount engine
  - L = Lock-up torque converter

== Axx ==
=== A10 ===
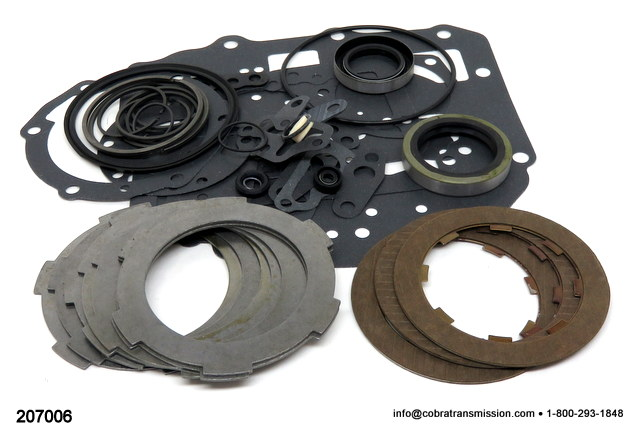
The transmission kit for A10 transmissions

1959 Toyoglide two speed semi-automatic, largely based on GM's cast iron Powerglide. First torque converted automatic built in Japan.

| 1 | 2 | R |
|---|---|---|
| 1.818 | 1.000 | –1.818 |

=== A20 ===
1963 two speed Toyoglide fully automatic. A March 1967 Toyota Motor Sales repair manual for the Toyoglide Automatic lists BP "Type A Suffix A" automatic transmission fluid (the General Motors Type A Suffix A specification of 1957, not the original 1949 Type A) among its recommended petroleum products, along with Caltex Texamatic Fluid, Esso Standard Automatic Transmission Fluid, Mobil Fluid 200 and Shell Donax T.6. In the United States, Toyota Motor Sales, U.S.A. offered the two-speed automatic, described as a "2-Speed Automatic Coupled to Torque Converter", as an option on the 1,900 cc Corona, and advertised the car as "the first import of its class to offer optional 2-speed torque converter Automatic Transmission".

=== A30 ===
Toyoglide three speed automatic. Where the two-speed Toyoglide manual recommended BP "Type A Suffix A" fluid, Toyota's June 1971 3-Speed Toyoglide repair manual states that "the fluid utilized in this transmission is an automatic transmission fluid Type F, and no other fluid should be used". Its recommended products are Castrol TQ Type F, BP Hydraulic ATF-B and ATF Type F, Caltex Texamatic Fluid Type F, Esso Glides, Mobil Fluid 210, and Shell Donax T7 and White Rose Type 7. The manual describes a three-element, single-stage, two-phase torque converter with a torque ratio of 2.4:1, and gear ratios of 2.400 (first), 1.479 (second), 1.000 (third) and 1.920 (reverse).

Applications (calendar years)

- 1967 Toyota Crown and Corona Mark II
- 1970–1973 Corona
- Crown
- Mark II
- 1971–1973 Celica
- Carina
- Corolla

=== A32 ===
1970 Toyota A32 3-Speed Electronically Controlled Automatic Transmission (EAT)

=== A40 ===
Three speed automatic

Applications (calendar years)

- 1975–1984 Toyota Carina 1600 RWD
- 1976–1980 Toyota Mark II x30/x40 2000
- 1977–1980 Toyota Crown 2600
- 1977–1981 Toyota Cressida
- 1977–1981 Volvo 200 series models with 2.1L I4 in 242 coupe, 244 sedan, and 245 wagon's called the AW55
- 1977–1981 Volvo 260 2.7L V6 called BW55 (Borg warner model 55 UK built one) identical to the A40
- 1978–1982 Toyota Celica 2000 RWD
- 1978–1980 Toyota Pickup 2WD 2.2L I4 20R
- 1979–1981 Toyota Corona liftback
- 1980–1983 Toyota Corolla 1300
- 1981–1984 Toyota Carina 1800 RWD
- 1981–1982 Toyota Cressida 2000
- 1982–1985 Toyota Starlet 1300

=== A40D ===
Four speed automatic

Applications (calendar years)

- 1977–1980 Toyota Celica Supra
- 1981 Toyota Corona
- 1981 Toyota Cressida
- 1981–1985 Toyota Celica 22R
- 1983–1986 Toyota Celica Supra (Australia)

=== A40DF ===
Four Speed Automatic 4WD

=== A41 ===
Three speed automatic

Applications (calendar years)

- 1981–1984 Toyota Starlet KP61
- 1981–1984 Toyota Corolla KE70
- 1983 Toyota Corolla AE71

=== A42D (AW70) ===
Four speed automatic

Application (calendar years)

- 1982–1993 Volvo 240 (03-70)
- 1985–1989 Volvo 740 non turbo 2.3L I4 (03-70)
- 1987 Toyota Cressida
- 1996–2001 Toyota Chaser/Mark II/Cresta (GX100)

=== A42DE ===
Same as A42D with Electronic Controls

=== A42DL ===
Four speed automatic with lockup torque converter

Applications (calendar years)

- 1984–1987 Toyota Corolla SR5
- 1987–1999 Toyota Crown equipped with 2.0 L 1G

=== A43 ===
Three speed automatic

Applications (calendar years)

- 1981 Toyota Pickup 2WD 2.4L I4 22R/RE (Federal emissions only, California emissions used A43D)

=== A43D ===
Four speed automatic without lockup torque converter.

This transmission model is not electronically controlled. It is instead controlled by throttle position and also by a governor.

Manufacturer designation: Aisin Warner 03-71

Applications (calendar years)

- 1981 Toyota Celica Supra
- 1981 Toyota Pickup 2WD 2.4L I4 22R (California emissions only, Federal emissions used A43)
- 1982–1995 Toyota Pickup 2WD 2.4L I4 22R/RE
- 1982–1995 Toyota Cab/Chassis 2.4L I4 22R/RE (flatbed, cube, motorhome)
- 1982–1985 Toyota Celica XX 2000G/S turbo
- 1982 Toyota Crown Royal 2.8L I6 5MG
- 1982–1985 Volvo 240 2.1L Turbo I4 (AW71)
- 1982–1990 Volvo 760 2.3L Turbo I4 (AW71)
- 1982–1985 Volvo 260 2.8L V6 (AW71)
- 1982–1990 Volvo 760 2.8L V6 (AW71)
- 1985–1991 Volvo 740 2.3L Turbo I4 (AW71)
- 1987–1990 Volvo 780 2.8L V6 (AW71)
- 1989–1991 Volvo 780 2.3L Turbo I4 (AW71)
- 1991 Volvo 960 2.8L V6 (AW71 – Australia only)
- 1991–1995 Volvo 940 2.3L Turbo I4 (AW71)
- 1995–2000 Toyota Tacoma 2WD 2.4L I4 2RZ
- 1995–2007 Toyota Comfort/Crown Comfort (LXS/YXS)
- 1996–2001 Toyota Chaser/Mark II/Cresta (LX100)

| 1 | 2 | 3 | 4 | R |
|---|---|---|---|---|
| 2.452 | 1.452 | 1.000 | 0.688 | –2.212 |

=== A43DE ===
Four speed automatic with lockup torque converter and electronic controls. Based on A43D.

Applications (calendar years):

- 1982–1987 Toyota Cressida
- 1983–1986 Toyota Celica Supra
- 1995–2002 Toyota Granvia

=== A43DL ===
Four speed automatic with lockup torque converter. Based on A43D.

Manufacturer designation: Aisin Warner 03-71L

Applications (calendar years)

- 1982–1985 Toyota Land Cruiser
- 1982 Toyota Celica Supra
- 1983–1985 Toyota Cressida
- 1990–1992 Volvo 740 2.3L Turbo I4 (AW71L)
- 1991–1997 Volvo 940 2.3L Turbo I4 (AW71L)

=== A44D ===
Four speed automatic without lockup torque converter.

Applications (calendar years)

- 1989–1991 4Runner 2WD 2.4L I4 22R-E
- 2001–2004 Toyota Tacoma 2WD 2.4L I4 2RZ

Gear Ratios

| 1 | 2 | 3 | 4 | R |
|---|---|---|---|---|
| 2.826 | 1.493 | 1.000 | 0.688 | –2.703 |

=== A44DL ===
Four speed automatic with lockup torque converter

Applications (calendar years)

- 1982–1991 Toyota Van
- 1989–1990 Volvo 740 GLE 16-Valve (AW72L)
- 1991 Volvo 940 GLE 16-Valve (AW72L)
- 1992–1995 Mitsubishi Montero 5 Dr. V43 (03-72L)(V4AW2)
- 1992–1995 Mitsubishi L300 – (P04v) (P03V)
- 1992–1995 Mitsubishi Express – (P03V) (V4AW2)
- 1997–1999 Hyundai Galloper

=== A44DE ===
Four speed automatic with lockup torque converter and electronic controls

Applications (calendar years)

- 1996-1998 Suzuki Sidekick 2WD & 4WD (03-72LE)
- 1998–2002 Kia Sportage 4WD (03-72LE)
- 1999–2005 Mazda Miata (03-70LE)
- 2001–2004 Chevrolet Tracker 2WD & 4WD (03-72LE)

=== A45D ===
Four Speed Automatic w/out lock-up torque converter

=== A45DE ===
Four speed automatic with lockup torque converter and electronic controls. It has a separate control unit for shift lock control.

Gear ratios for this transmission:

| 1 | 2 | 3 | 4 | R |
|---|---|---|---|---|
| 2.826 | 1.493 | 1.000 | 0.730 | -2.703 |

Applications include:

- Toyota HiAce CBF-TRH200K (Japan)
- 2004–2015 Toyota Innova 2.0 (TGN40)

=== A45DF ===
Four speed automatic with lockup torque converter and electronic controls 4WD

=== A45DL ===
Applications (calendar years)

- 1982–1990 Toyota Van

=== A46DE ===
Four speed automatic with lockup torque converter and electronic controls

Gear ratios for this transmission:

| 1 | 2 | 3 | 4 | R |
|---|---|---|---|---|
| 2.452 | 1.452 | 1.000 | 0.730 | –2.212 |

Applications (calendar years)

- 1990–1999 Toyota Previa/Tarago (RWD, non-supercharged)
- 1990–2000 Toyota Estima (RWD, non-supercharged)
- 1990–2000 Toyota Estima Lucida (RWD, non-supercharged)
- 1990–2000 Toyota Estima Emina (RWD, non-supercharged)

=== A46DF ===
Four speed automatic with lockup torque converter, electronic controls and viscous coupling center differential

Applications (calendar years)

- 1990–1999 Toyota Previa/Tarago (AllTrac/4WD, non-supercharged)
- 1990–2000 Toyota Estima (4WD, non-supercharged)
- 1990–2000 Toyota Estima Lucida (4WD, non-supercharged)
- 1990–2000 Toyota Estima Emina (4WD, non-supercharged)

=== A47DE ===
4 Speed Automatic Transmission

Applications (calendar years):

- 1998–2005 Lexus IS 200

| 1 | 2 | 3 | 4 | R | Final Drive |
|---|---|---|---|---|---|
| 2.45 | 1.45 | 1.000 | 0.753 | –2.222 | 4.3 |

=== A55 ===
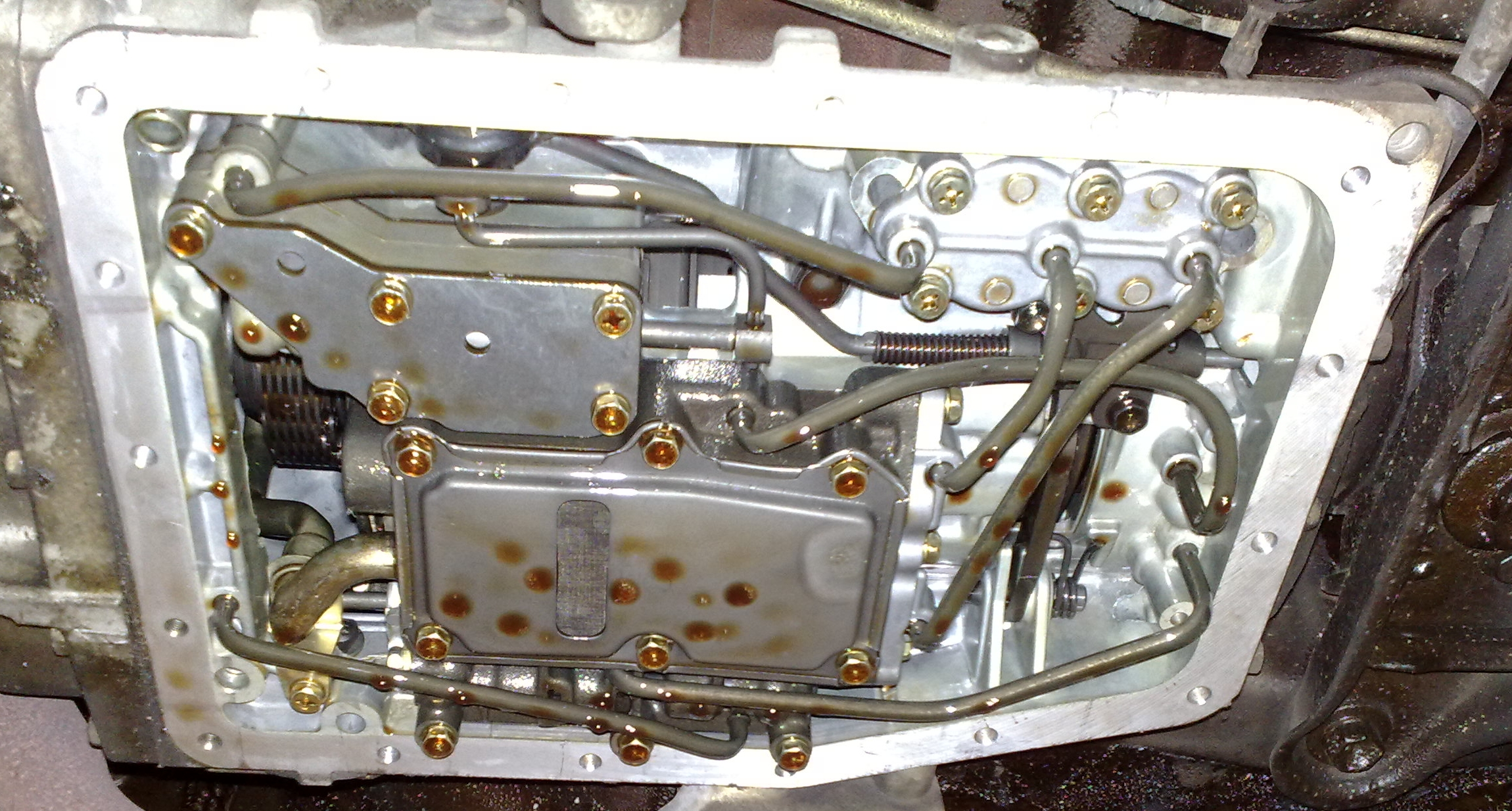
A55 transmission from below with sump taken off.

Three speed automatic front wheel drive, longitudinally mounted. Even with FWD, the engine is also mounted longitudinally.

Applications (calendar years)

- 1979–1981 Toyota Tercel AL11
- 1982–1986 Toyota Tercel AL20

== A1xx ==
FF Transaxle

=== A130L ===
Transmission ratios

| 1 | 2 | 3 | R | Final Drive |
|---|---|---|---|---|
| 2.5 | 1.5 | 1.0 | –2.0 | 3.578 |

=== A131 ===
3 Speed Automatic w/out lock up torque converter

=== A131H ===
3 Speed Automatic Transaxle AWD

Applications (calendar years)

- 1991 Toyota Corolla Coupe

| 1 | 2 | 3 | R | Final Drive |
|---|---|---|---|---|
| 2.810 | 1.549 | 1.000 | –2.296 | 3.526; 3.722 Optional |

=== A131L ===
3 Speed Automatic Transaxle

Applications (calendar years)

- 1984–2002 Toyota Corolla
- 1985–1988 Chevrolet Nova
- 1989–2000 Geo Prizm (rebadged Chevrolet Prizm after 1997)

| 1 | 2 | 3 | R | Final Drive |
|---|---|---|---|---|
| 2.810 | 1.549 | 1.000 | –2.296 | 3.526; 3.722 Optional |

=== A132L ===
3 Speed Automatic Transaxle

Applications (calendar years)

- 1988–1999 Toyota Tercel
- 1988–1992 Toyota Corolla (European, Asian, Latin Markets)
- 1993–1998 Toyota Starlet (2E)

| 1 | 2 | 3 | R | Final Drive |
|---|---|---|---|---|
| 2.810 | 1.549 | 1.000 | –2.296 | 3.526 Corolla; 3.722 Tercel (Optional or Corolla); 4.058 For Puerto Rico Spec |

=== A140E ===
4 Speed Electronic Controlled Automatic Transaxle (ECT)

Applications (calendar years)

- 1986–1989 Toyota Celica GT/GT-S (with ECT-S)
- 1991–2001 Toyota Camry (4 cyl.)
- 1994–1999 Toyota Celica GT
- 1994–1998 Toyota Curren ST206/ST207/ST208 (with ECT-S)
- 1997–2000 Geo Prizm (4 cyl.) (rebadged Chevrolet Prizm after 1997)
- 1999–2001 Toyota Camry Solara (4 cyl.)

| 1 | 2 | 3 | 4 | R | Final Drive |
|---|---|---|---|---|---|
| 2.810 | 1.549 | 1.000 | 0.706 | –2.296 | 3.736 |

=== A140L ===
4 Speed Hydraulic Controlled Automatic Transaxle (2-way overdrive)

Applications (calendar years)

- 1985–1986 Toyota Camry Turbodiesel
- 1986–1989 Toyota Celica ST/GT (without ECT)
- 1989,1991 Toyota Camry (without ECT)

These transmissions have a governor gear. Unlike the A140E counterpart which is electronically controlled, the A140L uses a plastic governor gear to select which gear to go into. Over time and wear, this plastic gear's teeth shred and eventually cease to be able to control gears. This results in a transmission that can only shift to first and reverse, but not to any further forward gears. Replacement of this governor gear is relatively inexpensive compared to a replacement transmission as it can be serviced without taking the transmission out of the car.

== A2xx ==
FF Transaxle

=== A240L ===
4 Speed Automatic Transaxle

Applications (calendar years)

- 1985–1992 Toyota Corolla (includes FX)

| 1 | 2 | 3 | 4 | R | Final Drive |
|---|---|---|---|---|---|
| 3.643 | 2.008 | 1.296 | 0.892 | –2.977 | 2.962 |

=== A240E ===
4 Speed Automatic Transaxle, electronically controlled

Applications (calendar years)

- 1984–1989 Toyota MR2 (N/A)
- 1988 Chevrolet Nova

=== A240H ===
4 Speed Automatic Transaxle AWD

Applications (calendar years):

- 1991 Toyota Corolla Station Wagon

| 1 | 2 | 3 | 4 | R | Final Drive |
|---|---|---|---|---|---|
| 3.643 | 2.008 | 1.296 | 0.891 | –2.977 | 4.562 |

=== A241E ===
4 Speed Automatic Transaxle

Applications (calendar years)

- 1988–1989 Toyota MR2 S/C
- 1989–1999 Toyota MR2 2.0 3S-GE and 3S-FE
- 1990–1999 Toyota Celica GT/GTS
- 1991–1995 Toyota MR2 2.2 5S-FE
- 1992–1998 Toyota Corona
- 1996–1997 Toyota RAV4
- 1997–2002 Toyota Caldina (Final drive of 2.893 for 3S-FE, 2.963 for 7A-FE, and 3.178 for 3C-TE)
- 1998–2000 Toyota Avensis

| 1 | 2 | 3 | 4 | R | Final Drive |
|---|---|---|---|---|---|
| 3.643 | 2.008 | 1.296 | 0.892 | –2.977 | 3.034 |

=== A241H ===
4 Speed Automatic Transaxle(AWD)

Applications (calendar years)

- 1990–1992 Corolla (AWD) Canada

| 1 | 2 | 3 | 4 | R |
|---|---|---|---|---|
| 3.643 | 2.008 | 1.296 | 0.892 | –2.977 |

=== A241L ===
4 Speed Automatic Transaxle

Applications (calendar years)

- 1986–1987 Toyota Corona (Japan)
- 1988–1992 Toyota Carina II
- 1990–1991 Toyota Celica GT
- 1996–2000 Toyota Corolla

| 1 | 2 | 3 | 4 | R | Final Drive |
|---|---|---|---|---|---|
| 3.643 | 2.008 | 1.296 | 0.892 | –2.977 | 3.034 |

=== A242E ===
4 Speed Automatic Transaxle w/out lock-up torque converter

Applications (calendar years)

- EP82 Toyota Starlet GT
- EP91 Toyota Glanza (Starlet)

=== A242L ===
4 Speed Automatic Transaxle

Applications (calendar years)

- 1995–1999 Toyota Tercel
- 1990–1995 Toyota Sera
- Early EP82 Toyota Starlet
- EP91 Toyota Starlet
- It can use with (2E)

| 1 | 2 | 3 | 4 | R | Final Drive |
|---|---|---|---|---|---|
| 3.643 | 2.008 | 1.296 | 0.892 | –2.977 | 2.821 |

=== A243L ===
4 Speed Automatic Transaxle

Applications (calendar years)

- 1990–1993 Toyota Celica ST

| 1 | 2 | 3 | 4 | R | Final Drive |
|---|---|---|---|---|---|
| 4.005 | 2.208 | 1.425 | 0.981 | –3.272 | 3.034 |

=== A244E ===
4 Speed Automatic Transaxle

Applications (calendar years)

- 1992–1999 Toyota Paseo

| 1 | 2 | 3 | 4 | R | Final Drive |
|---|---|---|---|---|---|
| 4.005 | 2.208 | 1.425 | 0.981 | –3.272 | 2.821 |

=== A244F ===
4 Speed Automatic Transaxle (4WD)

=== A244L ===
4 Speed Automatic Transaxle with Lock-Up Torque Converter

=== A245E ===
4 Speed Transaxle A245E was based on the A240E used in the 1989 MR2, but was reduced in size and weight

Applications (calendar years)

- 1993–1997 Toyota Corolla 1.6 4A-FE/4A-GE
- 1993–1998 Toyota Corolla 1.8 7A-FE
- 1993–1997 Geo Prizm LSI 1.6
- 1999–2008 Toyota Corolla 1.8 1ZZ-FE

Number of disc B3 is changed from 6 to 5 in 2005

Gear ratios for this transmission

| 1 | 2 | 3 | 4 | R |
|---|---|---|---|---|
| 3.643 | 2.008 | 1.296 | 0.892 | –2.977 |

Corolla Final Drive Axle

| 1993–1996 | 1997-2002 | 2003-2007 |
|---|---|---|
| 2.821 | 2.655 | 2.962 |

=== A246E ===
Gear ratios for this transmission

| 1 | 2 | 3 | 4 | R | Final Drive |
|---|---|---|---|---|---|
| 4.005 | 2.208 | 1.425 | 0.981 | –3.272 | 2.962 |

Applications (calendar years)

- 1994–1999 Toyota Celica ST
- 1997–2001 Toyota Corolla Spacio (AE111N 4AFE) 2WD (A246E-01A)
- 2000–2001 Toyota Avensis 1.8 VVT-i 1ZZ-FE engine
- 2002-2007 Toyota Corolla 1.6 VVT-i 3ZZ-FE engine
- 2003–2007 Toyota Matrix (with VVT-i Engine)
- 2003–2008 Pontiac Vibe (same as Toyota Matrix engine 1ZZ-FE)

== A3xx ==
FR Transmission

=== A340H ===
4 Speed Automatic Transmission (4x4)

Applications (calendar years)

- 1987–2001 Jeep Cherokee (XJ) 4.0L (AW4)
- 1987–1992 Jeep Comanche (MJ) 4.0L (AW4)
- 1987–1990 Jeep Wagoneer (XJ) 4.0L (AW4)
- 1988–1995 4x4 Trucks w/ V6
- 1988–1995 Toyota 4Runner (4x4) w/ V6 and ECT (electronic controlled transmission)
- 1988–1991 Isuzu Trooper 2.6 4 Cylinder
- 1992–1993 Jeep Grand Cherokee (ZJ) 4.0L (AW4)
- 1998–2005 Toyota Altezza Gita (GXE15W and JCE15W)

| 1 | 2 | 3 | 4 | R |
|---|---|---|---|---|
| 2.8 | 1.53 | 1.0 | 0.71 | –2.39 |

=== A340E (30-40LE) ===
The detachable bell housing, which attaches the main transmission case to the engine, has an engine-specific bolt pattern, which appears on its upper surface as cast-in letters. "J" indicates the straight-6 1/2-JZ engine, "U" the V8 UZ engine.

Applications (calendar years)

- 1985–1995 Toyota Pick-Up 3.0L
- 1986–1993 Toyota Supra (MA70)
- 1986–1992 Toyota Supra (GA70)
- 1987-1997 Toyota Century (VG40) 4.0L V8 (5V-EU)
- 1987–1992 Toyota Cressida (30-40LE)
- 1989–2003 Toyota 4Runner (4x2) (30-40LE)
- 1990–1993 Toyota Supra (JZA70)
- 1990–2000 Toyota Chaser/Mark II/Cresta 2.5 (1JZ-GE)
- 1990–1995 Toyota Crown Majesta 3.0L I6
- 1990–1994 Lexus LS 400
- 1990–1994 Volvo 960 3.0L
- 1991–2000 Toyota Soarer (JZZ30)
- 1991–1997 Toyota Aristo (2JZ-GE)
- 1992–2000 Lexus SC 300
- 1992–1997 Lexus SC 400
- 1993–1995 Toyota T100 3.0L V6
- 1993–1998 Toyota Previa 2.4L w/supercharger
- 1993–1996 Toyota Supra (2JZ-GE) (JZA80)
- 1995–2013 Toyota Tacoma 2.7L I4 (2WD), 3.4L V6
- 1995–1998 Volvo 960/S90/V90 (AW30-43LE)
- 1999–2003 Toyota Crown Athlete V (1JZ-GTE)
- 2000–2004 Toyota Tundra (4x2)
- 2001–2004 Toyota Sequoia (4x2)
- 2005–2007 Toyota Commuter 2.5L
- 2006–2011 Isuzu D-Max
- 2008–2018 Toyota Comfort (TSS11) (TSS13)
- 2008–2018 Toyota Crown Comfort (TSS10)

| 1 | 2 | 3 | 4 | R |
|---|---|---|---|---|
| 2.804 | 1.531 | 1.000 | 0.705 | –2.393 |

=== A340E (30-40LS) ===
OEM with 2JZ-GTE twin turbocharged engines only. This is the twin turbo only heavy duty version with some internal mods. The main case is similar to the common A340E but not interchangeable, the bell housing has "J3" cast into the upper surface, and is larger diameter to accept the larger torque converter and special flex plate. Applications (calendar years)

- 1991–1997 Toyota Aristo 3.0V (JZS147)
- 1997–2002 Toyota Supra RZ (JZA80)
- 1997–2004 Toyota Aristo V300 (JZS161)
- 2004 Isuzu Axiom 3.5L V6
- 2004 Isuzu Rodeo 3.5L V6

=== A340F (30-40LE) ===
Applications (calendar years)

- 1985–2004 Toyota 4Runner
- 1985–1995 Toyota Pickup (4x4 w/ 4 cyl)
- 1995–1998 Toyota T-100 (4x4)
- 1995–2015 Toyota Tacoma (4x4, 2005–2015 4 cyl only)
- 2000–2004 Toyota Tundra (4x4)
- 2001–2004 Toyota Sequoia (4x4)1st
- 2005–2015 Toyota Hilux (4x4)list

| 1 | 2 | 3 | 4 | R |
|---|---|---|---|---|
| 2.804 | 1.531 | 1.000 | 0.705 | –2.393 |

=== A340H ===
Applications (calendar years)

- 1991 Toyota Pickup 4x4 V6 Xtra Cab
- 1991 Toyota 4Runner 4x4 (Not used in Canadian 4cyls)

Gear Ratios

| 1 | 2 | 3 | 4 | R |
|---|---|---|---|---|
| 2.804 | 1.531 | 1.000 | 0.705 | –2.393 |

=== A341E (30-41LE) ===
Applications (calendar years)

- 1987–1999 Toyota Crown JZS130 (sedans and wagons)
- 1988–1990 Toyota Crown Royal Saloon G 4.0 V8
- 1990–2000 Toyota Chaser/Mark II/Cresta 2.5 GT/Tourer V (1JZ-GTE)
- 1991–1995 Toyota Crown Majesta 4.0L V8
- 1991–1997 Toyota Soarer 4.0L V8
- 1992–1999 Lexus SC 400 GT-L V8 cdn spec.
- 1992–1998 Volvo 2.9L I6 (AW30-40LE)
- 1993–1995 Lexus GS 300
- 1995–1997 Lexus LS 400

| 1 | 2 | 3 | 4 | R | Final Drive |
|---|---|---|---|---|---|
| 2.531 | 1.531 | 1.000 | 0.705 | –1.88 | 3.916 |

=== A341F ===
The A341F is an A340F with locking/unlocking transfer case differential to allow an AWD mode on the Sequoia.

Applications (calendar years)

- 2001–2004 Toyota Sequoia (4x4)

=== A341H ===
4 Speed Automatic Transmission (AWD)

=== A342E ===
Applications (calendar years)

- 1997–2004 Toyota Century (GZG50)

=== A343E (30-43LS) ===
Valve body has an extra solenoid for full electronically controlled line pressure. Allows for greater control of shift strategy and line pressure via stock ECU/TCM. 1JZ-GTE, 2JZ-GTE and 2JZ-GE variants use a "J2" bellhousing. 30-40LE and 30-41LE "J2" torque converters are interchangeable. Some forum reports they are internally upgraded and use the same internals as the 30-40LS. The European/GCC spec TT Supra (EU TT Supra has a larger cooler) and the automatic JZX110 turbo chassis has a smaller cooler. Maximum power using the stock internals is reported to be 450. There were only 40 UK Spec TT Supra's produced using the A343E.

Applications (calendar years)

- 1994-1996 Toyota Supra TT (EU / GCC Spec) - (2JZ-GTE)
- 2001–2004 Toyota Mark II IR-V (1JZ-GTE)
- 2001-2004 Toyota Mark II Blit IR-V (1JZ-GTE)
- 2001-2004 Toyota Verossa VR25 (1JZ-GTE)
- 1993–1995 Lexus GS 300 (GCC Spec) - (2JZ-GE)
- 2004–2015 Toyota Innova (2TR-FE & 2KD-FTV)

| 1 | 2 | 3 | 4 | R |
|---|---|---|---|---|
| 2.804 | 1.530 | 1.000 | 0.753 | –2.393 |

=== A343F ===
Applications (calendar years)

- 1990–1992 Toyota Land Cruiser II 2.4 (Japan, 4x4)
- 1990–1996 Toyota Hilux Surf 4x4 – 2.4 & 3.0 (4x4)
- 1993–2014 Toyota Land Cruiser Prado (3.0l,2.7l)
- 1995–1997 Toyota Land Cruiser 80-series (4x4)
- 1998–2001 Toyota Land Cruiser 100-series (4x4)
- 1996–1998 Lexus LX 450 (4x4)
- 1998–2002 Lexus LX 470 (4x4)
- 2005–2015 Toyota Fortuner V 2.7 At (4x4)

| 1 | 2 | 3 | 4 | R |
|---|---|---|---|---|
| 2.804 | 1.530 | 1.000 | 0.753 | –2.393 |

=== A350E ===
5 Speed Automatic.

Applications (calendar years)

- 1996–1997 Lexus GS 300

NOTE: Replaced by A650E for 1998 model year.

Gear ratios for this transmission

| 1 | 2 | 3 | 4 | 5 | R |
|---|---|---|---|---|---|
| 2.804 | 1.978 | 1.531 | 1.000 | 0.705 | –2.394 |

== A4xx ==
FR Transmission

=== A440F ===
Type: Full automatic 4-speed transmission with converter lock-up. Fully mechanical / hydraulical control, no electrics or electronics. Mechanical throttle control input for kick-down function. Connects to external oil cooler. Uses ATF-II.

Application

- 1985–1992 Land Cruiser

Gear ratios

| 1 | 2 | 3 | 4 | R |
|---|---|---|---|---|
| 2.950 | 1.530 | 1.000 | 0.717 | –2.678 |

=== A442F ===
Applications (calendar years)

- 1993–early 1995 Land Cruiser 80 series
- 1993–2007 had electronic control via solenoids and ECT Land Cruiser 80 series (Venezuela)
- 1990–1992 Some early model year 92 HDJ80s had fully hydraulic A442F Land Cruiser 80 series
- 1992–early 1995 A442F had electronic control via solenoids and ECT Land Cruiser 80 series
- 1998–2004 Land Cruiser 100 series diesel (South Africa) (some asian market with the 2uz-fe engine use this to)

Gear ratios

| 1 | 2 | 3 | 4 | R |
|---|---|---|---|---|
| 2.950 | 1.530 | 1.000 | 0.765 | –2.678 |

=== A443E ===
Applications (calendar years)

- 2000–2002 Toyota Dyna 4.9 D (XZU411)

=== A443F ===
Applications (calendar years)

- 1995–2002 Toyota Mega Cruiser

== A5xx ==
FF Transaxle

=== A540E ===
Applications (calendar years)

- 1988–1998 Camry (V6)
- 1991–1993 Camry (V6)
- 1992–1993 Lexus ES300
- 1996 Camry prominent
- 1998–2000 Sienna

Gear ratios

| 1 | 2 | 3 | 4 | R | Final Drive |
|---|---|---|---|---|---|
| 2.810 | 1.549 | 1.000 | 0.734 | –2.296 | 3.625 |

=== A540H ===
Applications (calendar years)

- 1989–1991 Camry (4-cyl AWD)
- 1996–1999 RAV4 (4x4)

| 1 | 2 | 3 | 4 | R | Final Drive |
|---|---|---|---|---|---|
| 2.81 | 1.549 | 1.000 | 0.734 | –2.296 | 4.404 |

(This particular version has a weak reverse – prone to noise and failure – failure included problems with 1st brake)

=== A541E ===
Applications (calendar years)

- 1994–2001 Toyota Camry (V6)
- 1994–1998 Lexus ES 300
- 1995–2004 Toyota Avalon
- 1999–2003 Toyota Solara (V6)
- 2001–2003 Toyota Sienna

(USA 1997–2004) gear ratios

| 1 | 2 | 3 | 4 | R | Final Drive |
|---|---|---|---|---|---|
| 2.81 | 1.549 | 1.000 | 0.735 | –2.296 | 3.625 |

(Aus 2000–2004) gear ratios

| 1 | 2 | 3 | 4 | R | Final Drive |
|---|---|---|---|---|---|
| 2.81 | 1.549 | 1.000 | 0.735 | –2.296 | 3.973 |

== A6xx ==
FR Transmission

=== A650E ===
5 Speed Automatic Transmission

I6 and V8 versions similar. However V8 versions have slight internal upgrades to handle the increased torque (35-50LS?).

Applications (calendar years)

- 1997–2001 Lexus SC 400 / GS400
- 1998–2005 Lexus GS 300
- 1998–2005 Lexus GS 430
- 1998–2000 Lexus LS 400
- 1999–2004 Toyota Crown Majesta 4.0
- 1999-2003 Toyota Crown Athlete G / Royal Saloon G
- 1998–2005 Toyota Altezza RS200
- 2001–2003 Lexus LS 430
- 2001–2005 Lexus SC 430
- 2001–2005 Lexus IS 300

| 1 | 2 | 3 | 4 | 5 | R | Final Drive |
|---|---|---|---|---|---|---|
| 3.357 | 2.180 | 1.424 | 1.000 | 0.753 | –3.431 | Varies |

== A7xx ==
FR Transmission

=== A750E ===
5 Speed Automatic Transmission

Applications (calendar years)

- 2003–2009 Toyota 4Runner (V8) (BA bell housing)
- 2004–2009 Toyota Sequoia
- 2005–2024 Toyota 4Runner (V6)
- 2005–2015 Toyota Tacoma (V6)
- 2005–2009 Toyota Tundra
- 2005– Toyota Hilux
- 2007–2022 Toyota FJ Cruiser (4x2)

=== A750F ===
5 Speed Automatic Transmission(4x4)

Applications (calendar years)

- 2003–2024 Toyota 4Runner (4x4)
- 2003–2007 Toyota Land Cruiser (J100, 4x4)
- 2003–2009 Lexus GX 470 (4x4)
- 2003–2007 Lexus LX 470 (4x4)
- 2004–2009 Toyota Sequoia (4x4)
- 2005–2015 Toyota Tacoma (V6, 4x4)
- 2005–2009 Toyota Tundra (4x4)
- 2005–2015 Toyota Land Cruiser Prado (4.0 L V6, 4x4)
- 2005–2015 Toyota Fortuner 4.0L
- 2005–2015 Toyota Hilux 7th Generation (4x4)
- 2015-2017 Toyota Hilux 8th Generation (4x4) (Indonesia, Vietnam, Pakistan & South Africa)
- 2007–2022 Toyota FJ Cruiser (4x4)
- 2009–2021 Mitsubishi Pajero (4x4)
- 2011–2015 Isuzu D-Max (4x4)
- 2011–2015 Isuzu MU-X (4x4)

| 1 | 2 | 3 | 4 | 5 | R | Final Drive |
|---|---|---|---|---|---|---|
| 3.52 | 2.042 | 1.4 | 1.000 | 0.716 | –3.224 | 3.583~3.727 |

=== A750H ===
5 Speed Automatic Transmission

Applications (calendar years)

- 2004–2009 Toyota Mark X (AWD)

=== A760E ===
6 Speed Automatic Transmission

Applications (calendar years)

- 2004–2008 Toyota Crown (GRS184)
- 2005–2007 Lexus GS 300
- 2005–2013 Lexus IS 300
- 2005–2013 Lexus IS 350 RWD
- 2006–2013 Lexus GS 350
- 2008–2012 Toyota Crown (GRS204)
- 2009–2019 Toyota Mark X (GRX133)
- 2010–2019 Toyota Tundra 4.6L
- 2010–2019 Toyota Sequoia 4.6L

| 1 | 2 | 3 | 4 | 5 | 6 | R |
|---|---|---|---|---|---|---|
| 3.520 | 2.042 | 1.400 | 1.000 | 0.716 | 0.586 | –3.224 |

=== A760F ===
- 2010–2019 Toyota Tundra 4.6L 4WD
- 2010–2019 Toyota Sequoia 4.6L 4WD
- 2010–2023 Lexus GX 460

| 1 | 2 | 3 | 4 | 5 | 6 | R | Final Drive |
|---|---|---|---|---|---|---|---|
| 3.52 | 2.042 | 1.4 | 1.000 | 0.716 | 0.586 | –3.224 | 3.909 |

=== A760H ===
6 Speed Automatic Transmission

Applications (calendar years)

- 2005–2007 Lexus GS 300 (AWD)
- 2006–2007 Lexus GS 350 (AWD)
- 2006–2013 Lexus IS 250 (AWD)
- 2006–present Lexus IS 350 (AWD)
- 2007–2008 Lexus GS 350 (AWD)
- 2009–present Toyota Mark X (AWD)
- 2016–present Lexus IS 300 (AWD)

| 1 | 2 | 3 | 4 | 5 | 6 | R | Final Drive |
|---|---|---|---|---|---|---|---|
| 3.52 | 2.042 | 1.4 | 1.000 | 0.716 | 0.586 | –3.224 | 3.909 |

=== A761E ===
6 Speed Automatic Transmission

Applications (calendar years)

- 2003–2006 Lexus LS 430
- 2004–2007 Toyota Crown Majesta UZS186
- 2005–2007 Lexus GS 430
- 2005–2010 Lexus SC 430
- 2005–2016 Toyota Century

| 1 | 2 | 3 | 4 | 5 | 6 | R |
|---|---|---|---|---|---|---|
| 3.296 | 1.958 | 1.348 | 1.000 | 0.725 | 0.582 | –2.951 |

=== A761H ===
6 Speed Automatic Transmission with transfer case for AWD application

Applications (calendar years)

- 2004–2007 Toyota Crown Majesta UZS187
- 2008–2012 Toyota Crown Majesta UZS207

| 1 | 2 | 3 | 4 | 5 | 6 | R |
|---|---|---|---|---|---|---|
| 3.296 | 1.958 | 1.348 | 1.000 | 0.725 | 0.582 | –2.951 |

== A8xx ==
FR Transmission

=== A860E / AS68RC ===
6 Speed Automatic Transmission

Applications (calendar years)

- Toyota Dyna Cargo (Japan)
- Hino Dutro
- Hino 300

| 1 | 2 | 3 | 4 | 5 | 6 | R | Torque converter ratio |
|---|---|---|---|---|---|---|---|
| 3.741 | 2.003 | 1.343 | 1.000 | 0.773 | 0.634 | –3.539 | 1.951 |

== A9xx ==
FR Transmission

=== A960E ===
6 Speed Automatic Transmission

Applications (calendar years)

- 2004–2019 Toyota Mark X (GRX120/121/130)
- 2005–2013 Lexus IS (XE20)
- 2006 Lexus GS 300
- 2008 Toyota Crown 2500CC
- 2012–present Toyota 86/Toyota GR86/Scion FR-S/Subaru BRZ
- 2013–2015 Lexus IS (XE30)

| 1 | 2 | 3 | 4 | 5 | 6 | R |
|---|---|---|---|---|---|---|
| 3.538 | 2.06 | 1.404 | 1.000 | 0.713 | 0.582 | –3.168 |

== AB6xx ==
FR transmission

=== AB60E ===
6 Speed Automatic Transmission

Torque converter lockup in 4th, 5th and 6th gears. Electronic control. Two overdrives.

Applications (calendar years)

- 2007–2021 Toyota Tundra 5.7L
- 2008–2022 Toyota Sequoia 5.7L

Gear ratios

| 1 | 2 | 3 | 4 | 5 | 6 | R |
|---|---|---|---|---|---|---|
| 3.333 | 1.960 | 1.353 | 1.000 | 0.728 | 0.588 | –3.061 |

=== AB60F ===
6 Speed Automatic Transmission

Torque converter lockup in 5th and 6th gears.

Applications (calendar years)

- 2007–2021 Toyota Tundra 5.7L (4x4)
- 2008–2022 Toyota Sequoia 5.7L (4x4)
- 2008–2015 Lexus LX 570 (4x4)
- 2008–2021 Toyota Land Cruiser 200 1VD (4x4)

== AC6xx ==
FR/4WD transmission

=== AC60E ===
6-speed Automatic Transmission

Torque converter lockup in 4th, 5th and 6th gears. Electronic control. Two overdrives.

Applications (calendar years)

- 2015–present Toyota Hilux 2.4 D-4D Eighth generation (AN120/AN130)
- 2015–present Toyota Innova/Innova Crysta
- 2015–present Toyota Fortuner
- 2015–present Isuzu D-Max 2WD
- 2015–present Isuzu MU-X 2WD
- 2017–present Toyota Land Cruiser Prado (2.8 diesel)

Gear ratios

| 1 | 2 | 3 | 4 | 5 | 6 | R |
|---|---|---|---|---|---|---|
| 3.600 | 2.090 | 1.488 | 1.000 | 0.687 | 0.580 | –3.732 |

=== AC60F ===
6 Speed Automatic Transmission

Torque converter lockup in 5th and 6th gears.

Applications (calendar years)

- 2015–present Toyota Hilux 2.4 D-4D AWD 2.8 D-4D AWD & V6 4.0L 1GR-FE 4WD Eighth generation (AN120/AN130)
- 2015–2023 Toyota Land Cruiser Prado Fourth generation (J150)
- 2018–2023 Toyota Land Cruiser Prado GRJ150 4.0L 1GR-FE Fourth generation (J150)
- 2023-present Toyota Land Cruiser Prado Fifth generation 2.7L (J250)
- 2015–present Isuzu D-Max 4WD
- 2015–present Isuzu MU-X 4WD
- 2016–2023 Toyota Tacoma 2.7 4WD & 3.5 4WD
- 2018–present Toyota HiAce/Toyota Commuter 2.8 D-4D Sixth generation (H300)
- 2020–present Mahindra Thar
- 2022–present Mahindra Scorpio

== AX8xx 8-Speed ==
Gear Ratios (Note: Differences in gear ratios have a measurable, direct impact on vehicle dynamics, performance, waste emissions as well as fuel mileage)
| Aisin | Toyota | First Delivery | Gear | | | | | | | | | | Total Span | | | Avg. Step | Components | |
| Aisin | Toyota | First Delivery | R2 (Note: Logically, the gearset concept (layout) provides for this 2nd reverse gear, but it will most likely not be used in the transmissions that the car manufacturers eventually bring to market. In some data sheets, the gear ratio of R2 is given, presumably a careless error) | R1 | 1 | 2 | 3 | 4 | 5 | 6 | 7 | 8 | Nomi- nal | Effec- tive | Cen- ter | Avg. Step | Total | per Gear (Note: Forward gears only) |
|---|---|---|---|---|---|---|---|---|---|---|---|---|---|---|---|---|---|---|
| TL-80SN | AA 80E/F | 2006 | −2.176 | −4.056 | 4.597 | 2.724 | 1.864 | 1.464 | 1.231 | 1.000 | 0.824 | 0.685 | 6.709 | 5.920 | 1.775 | 1.312 | 3 Gearsets; 2 Brakes; 4 Clutches | 1.125 |
| — | AB 80E/F | 2015 | −2.053 | −3.786 | 4.796 | 2.811 | 1.844 | 1.429 | 1.214 | 1.000 | 0.818 | 0.672 | 7.132 | 5.630 | 1.796 | 1.324 | 3 Gearsets; 2 Brakes; 4 Clutches | 1.125 |
| TR-80SD | AE 80E/F | 2010 | −2.053 | −3.825 | 4.845 | 2.8404 | 1.864 | 1.4369 | 1.217 | 1.000 | 0.816 | 0.672 | 7.206 | 5.689 | 1.805 | 1.326 | 3 Gearsets; 2 Brakes; 4 Clutches | 1.125 |
| TR-81SD | — | 2010 | −2.182 | −4.066 | 4.970 | 2.8398 | 1.864 | 1.4370 | 1.210 | 1.000 | 0.825 | 0.686 | 7.247 | 5.930 | 1.846 | 1.327 | 3 Gearsets; 2 Brakes; 4 Clutches | 1.125 |
| TR-82SD | — | 2010 | −2.182 | −4.024 | 4.919 | 2.811 | 1.844 | 1.429 | 1.207 | 1.000 | 0.827 | 0.686 | 7.173 | 5.869 | 1.836 | 1.325 | 3 Gearsets; 2 Brakes; 4 Clutches | 1.125 |
| — | AL 80E/F | 2023 | −1.870 | −3.646 | 4.413 | 2.808 | 1.950 | 1.511 | 1.274 | 1.000 | 0.793 | 0.652 | 6.774 | 5.596 | 1.696 | 1.314 | 3 Gearsets; 2 Brakes; 4 Clutches | 1.125 |

=== AA80E ===
AWD/RWD transmission

The AA80E (Aisin TL-80SN) becomes the world's first eight-speed automatic transmission.

Applications (calendar years)

- 2007–2017 Lexus LS 460
- 2008–2011 Lexus GS 460
- 2008–2014 Lexus IS F
- 2009–2013 Toyota Crown Majesta
- 2014–2019 Cadillac CTS (with a 2.85 final drive ratio)
- 2015–present Lexus RC F (3.133 final drive)
- 2016–2020 Lexus GS F (2.937 final drive)
- 2021–present Lexus IS 500 F Sport Performance (3.133 final drive)

=== AA80F ===
AWD transmission. Same gear ratios as the AA80E but a shorter 3.133 final drive ratio is used.

Application(s)

- Lexus LS 460

=== AA81E ===
RWD transmissions. Pairs with Toyota 2GR-FSE and 2GR-FKS V6 engines.

- 2013–2018 Toyota Crown Athlete
- 2014–2020 Lexus GS 350 (2.937 final drive)
- 2014–present Lexus IS 350 RWD (3.133 final drive)
- 2015–present Lexus RC 350

=== AE80F ===
AWD transmission

Applications (calendar years)

- 2015–2021 Lexus LX 570
- 2015–2021 Land Cruiser 5.7L
- 2015–present Mitsubishi Pajero Sport

=== AL80E ===
RWD transmission

Applications (calendar years)

- 2023–present Tacoma 2.4L Turbo 2WD
- 2024-present 4Runner 2.4L Turbo 2WD

=== AL80F ===
AWD transmission

Applications (calendar years)

- 2023–present Tacoma 2.4L Turbo 4WD
- 2023-present Land Cruiser Prado 2.4L Turbo 4WD
- 2024-present 4Runner 2.4L Turbo 4WD

== AGA0E ==
10-speed automatic Transmission

Applications (calendar years)

- 2017–present Lexus LC500 (Z100)
- 2017–present Lexus LS350 (XF50)
- 2021–present Lexus LS500 (XF50)
- 2021–present Lexus LX (J310)
- 2021–present Toyota Land Cruiser (J300)
- 2021–present Toyota Tundra (XK70)
- 2022–present Toyota Sequoia (XK80)

Gear ratios

| 1 | 2 | 3 | 4 | 5 | 6 | 7 | 8 | 9 | 10 | R |
|---|---|---|---|---|---|---|---|---|---|---|
| 4.923 | 3.153 | 2.349 | 1.879 | 1.462 | 1.193 | 1.000 | 0.792 | 0.640 | 0.598 | –5.169 |

== AJAxx ==
FR/4WD Transmission

=== AJA0E ===
10-speed automatic Transmission

Applications (calendar years)

- 2021–present Toyota Tundra 3.4LTT 2WD

Gear ratios

| 1 | 2 | 3 | 4 | 5 | 6 | 7 | 8 | 9 | 10 | R |
|---|---|---|---|---|---|---|---|---|---|---|
| 4.923 | 3.257 | 2.349 | 1.944 | 1.532 | 1.193 | 1.000 | 0.810 | 0.661 | 0.613 | –4.307 |

=== AJA0F ===
10-speed automatic Transmission

Applications (calendar years)

- 2021–present Toyota Tundra 3.4LTT 4WD

Gear ratios

| 1 | 2 | 3 | 4 | 5 | 6 | 7 | 8 | 9 | 10 | R |
|---|---|---|---|---|---|---|---|---|---|---|
| 4.923 | 3.257 | 2.349 | 1.944 | 1.532 | 1.193 | 1.000 | 0.810 | 0.661 | 0.613 | –4.307 |

== See also ==
- Toyota U transmission
- List of Toyota transmissions: automatic and manual transmissions
- List of Aisin transmissions
- List of Toyota engines
