= List of KrAZ vehicles =

This is a list of KrAZ vehicle models:

Model	Photo	Year first manufactured	Year last manufactured	Wheel arrangement	Variants
KrAZ-214		1959	1967	6x6	KrAZ-214B
KrAZ-219		1959	1965	6x4	KrAZ-219B
KrAZ-221		1959	1966	6x4	KrAZ-221B
KrAZ-222 "Dnipro"		1959	1966	6x4	KrAZ-222V "Dnipro"
KrAZ-254		1959 (prototype)			
KrAZ-253B		1962 (prototype)			
KrAZ-257		1965	1994	6x4	KrAZ-257B, KrAZ-257B1, KrAZ-257S
KrAZ-258B		1966	1989	6x4	
KrAZ-256B		1966	1994	6x4	KrAZ-256B1, KrAZ-256B1, KrAZ-256BM, KrAZ-256B1C, KrAZ-256B1-030
KrAZ-255B		1967	1994	6x6	KrAZ-255B1, KrAZ-255BS, KrAZ-255D, KrAZ-255L, KrAZ-255V
KrAZ-6434		1976 (prototype)		8x8	
KrAZ-250		1978	1992	6x4	KrAZ-250V, KrAZ-251 (prototype), KrAZ-252 (prototype)
KrAZ-260		1979	1993	6x6	KrAZ-260A, KrAZ-260D (prototype), KrAZ-260G, KrAZ-260L (prototype), KrAZ-260V, KrAZ-260 "Tornado"
KrAZ-6437		1987	in production	6x6	KrAZ-64371, KrAZ-64372 "Forester" (6x6)
KrAZ-6510		1992	in production	6x4	KrAZ-6424S4, KrAZ-6444, KrAZ-6510TE, KrAZ-65101, KrAZ-651001
KrAZ-6443		1992	in production	6x6	KrAZ-64431 (6x4), KrAZ-644301, KrAZ-644321
KrAZ-5444		1993	in production	4x2	
KrAZ-65053		1994	in production	6x4	KrAZ-65053IK
KrAZ-6322		1994	in production	6x6	KrAZ-6322 "Soldier", KrAZ-6322PA, KrAZ-63221 (6x6), KrAZ-6322-047, KrAZ-6322-056, KrAZ-6446, KrAZ-6446 "Burlak", KrAZ-6446 "Titan-01", KrAZ-6322 "Raptor"
KrAZ-5133		1995		4x2	KrAZ-5133BE, KrAZ-5133V2
KrAZ-5131		1995		4x4	
KrAZ-6133		1996	in production	6x4 6x6	KrAZ-6133S6, KrAZ-6133KE, KrAZ-6133M6, KrAZ-6133R4
KrAZ-65055		1997	in production	6x4	KrAZ-65032, KrAZ-65033, KrAZ-65055IK
KrAZ-6233		2003	in production	6x4 6x6	KrAZ-6230S4 (6x4), KrAZ-6322M6 (6x6), KrAZ-6322R4 (6x4), KrAZ-6322R6 (6x6)
KrAZ-7140 (KrAZ N30.1Е)		2004	in production	8x6	KrAZ-7140S6
KrAZ-7133		2004	in production	8x4	KrAZ-7133N4, KrAZ-7133R4, KrAZ-7133S4-030 "Brigadier", KrAZ-7133V4-600
KrAZ-6140TE		2006 (prototype)		6x6	
KrAZ-5233		2007	in production	4x2	KrAZ-5233VE (4x4), KrAZ-5233N2, KrAZ-5233NE (4x4), KrAZ-5233 "Raptor"
KrAZ T17.0EX "Burlak"		2010	in production	6x4	KrAZ 17.0EX "Titan-02"
KrAZ N12.2		2011	in production	4x2	KrAZ N12.0 (prototype), KrAZ N12.2M (KrAZ-5544), KrAZ N12.2R, KrAZ N12.2-UYAR-01
KrAZ N23.2		2011	in production	6x4	KrAA N22.2 (6x6), KrAZ N23.0 (prototype), KrAZ N23.2M, KrAZ N23.2R, KrAZ K16.2, KrAZ K18.2R, KrAZ M19.2R, KrAZ Р23.2, KrAZ Р23.2-JXZ 37-4.16НР, KrAZ-6230C4 "Caravan", KrAZ-6511S4 "Caravan"
KrAZ S18.0		2011	in production	6x4	KrAZ S18.1 "Maximum", KrAZ V18.1X (6x6), KrAZ N22.1, KrAZ M16.1X (6x6)
KrAZ S20.2		2011	in production	6x4	KrAZ S20.0 (prototype), KrAZ S20.2M, KrAZ S20.2R
KrAZ K12.2		2012	in production	4x2	KrAZ-5401K2
KrAZ-В6.2MEX		2012	in production	4x4	
KrAZ-В12.2МЕХ		2012	in production	6x6	
KrAZ-5401		2013	in production	4x2	KrAZ-5401B2, KrAZ-5401H2 (refrigerated van), KrAZ-5401K2 (vacuum street sweeper), KrAZ-5401S2, KrAZ-5401NE
KrAZ S26.2М (KrAZ-7511S4)		2014	in production	6x4	
KrAZ-7634 (KrAZ N27.3EKh)		2014	in production	8x8	
KrAZ-6511		2014	in production	6x2 6x4 6x6	
KrAZ Spartan		2014	in production	4x4	
KrAZ Cougar		2014	in production	4x4	
KrAZ Cobra		2014	in production	4x4	
KrAZ Shrek One		2014	in production	4x4	KrAZ Shrek One TC (APC), KrAZ Shrek One Amb (Armored ambulance), KrAZ Shrek One RCV
KrAZ Fiona		2015	in production	6x6	
KrAZ Forpost		2015	in production	4x4 6x6	
KrAZ Hurricane		2015	in production	8x8	
KrAZ Hulk		2016	in production	4x4	
KrAZ-4501		2017	in production	4x2	
