= KrAZ N12.2 =

КrАZ N12.2
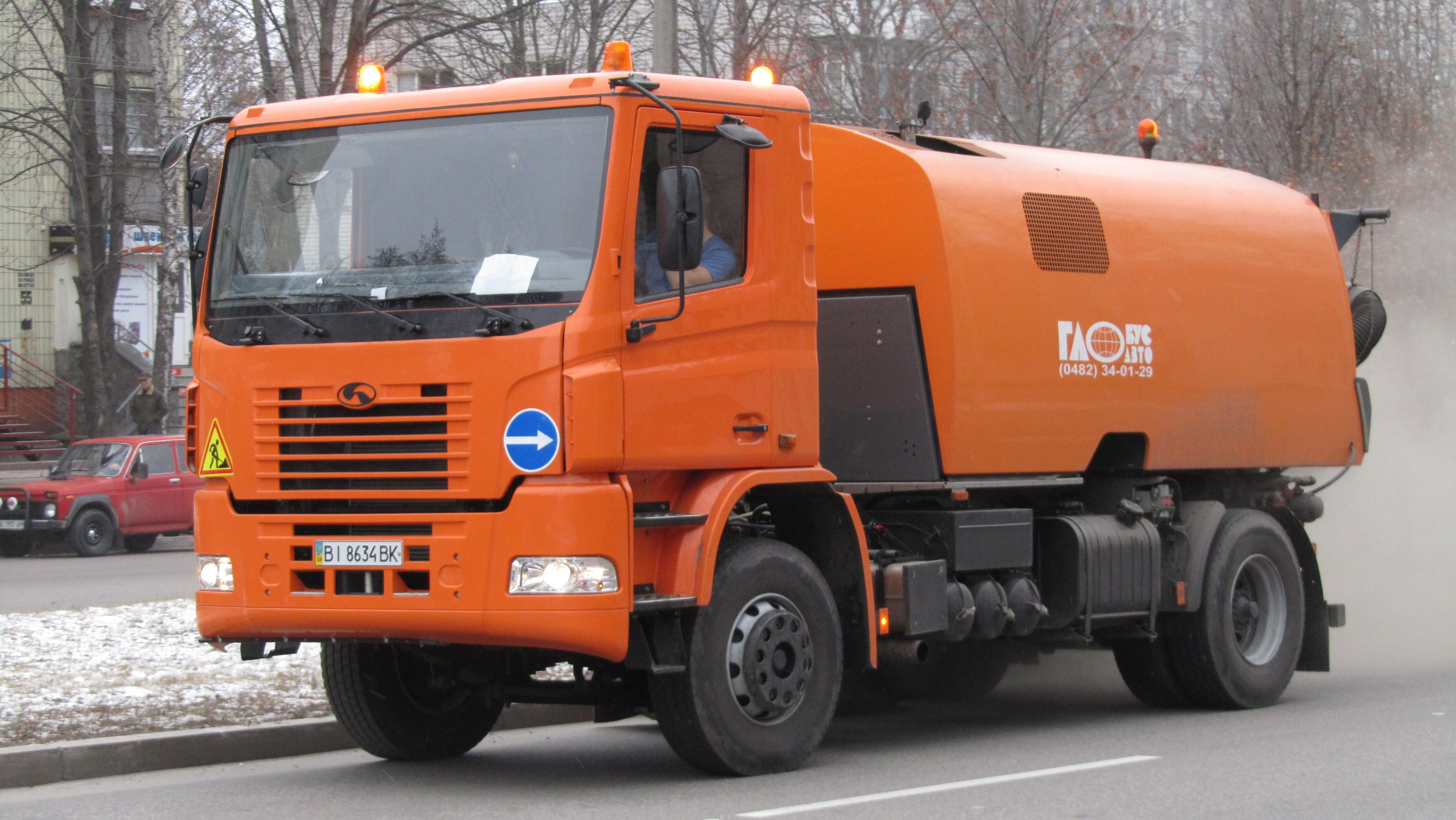

Overview
- Manufacturer: KrAZ
- Production: 2011-present

Body and chassis
- Class: Truck
- Body style: Truck
- Related: КrAZ N23.2; КrAZ C20.2

Powertrain
- Engine: 6.7L YaMZ-536 I6 diesel
- Transmission: 9-speed 9JS150TA manual

Dimensions
- Wheelbase: 4,200 mm (170 in)
- Length: 7,460 mm (294 in)
- Width: 2,490 mm (98 in)
- Height: 3,115 mm (122.6 in)

The KrAZ N12.2 truck is manufactured at the KrAZ plant in Ukraine. It was first presented in 2011.

KrAZ N12.2 is provided engine YaMZ-536 rated at 312 hp, the MFZ-430 clutch and the 9JS150ТА mechanical transmission.

== Variants ==
- KrAZ N12.0 - prototype with KrAZ-built cab. Produced in 2010.
- KrAZ N12.2 - basic production model with KrAZ cab.
- KrAZ N12.2R - prototype with Renault Kerax cab.
- KrAZ N12.2M (KrAZ-5544) - version with MAN TGA cab, no sleeper, manufactured by Hubei Qixing (model PW21)
- KrAZ-N12.2-UYAR-01- road repair machine
- KrAZ-K12.2 - special purpose vehicles on H12.2 chassis
- KrAZ-5401 - production version of N12.2R with Renault Kerax cab and a methane-fueled Mercedes-Benz M906LAG engine.

== Technical characteristics ==
- Engine: YaMZ-536 6.65 L diesel 6 cyl. (Euro IV)
- Power: 312 PS (229 kW)
- Torque: 1230 Nm
- Transmission: mechanical 9JS150ТА
- Clutch: single disk MFZ-430
- Axle configuration: 4x2
- Payload: 13.500 kg
