= KrAZ Fiona =

Fiona
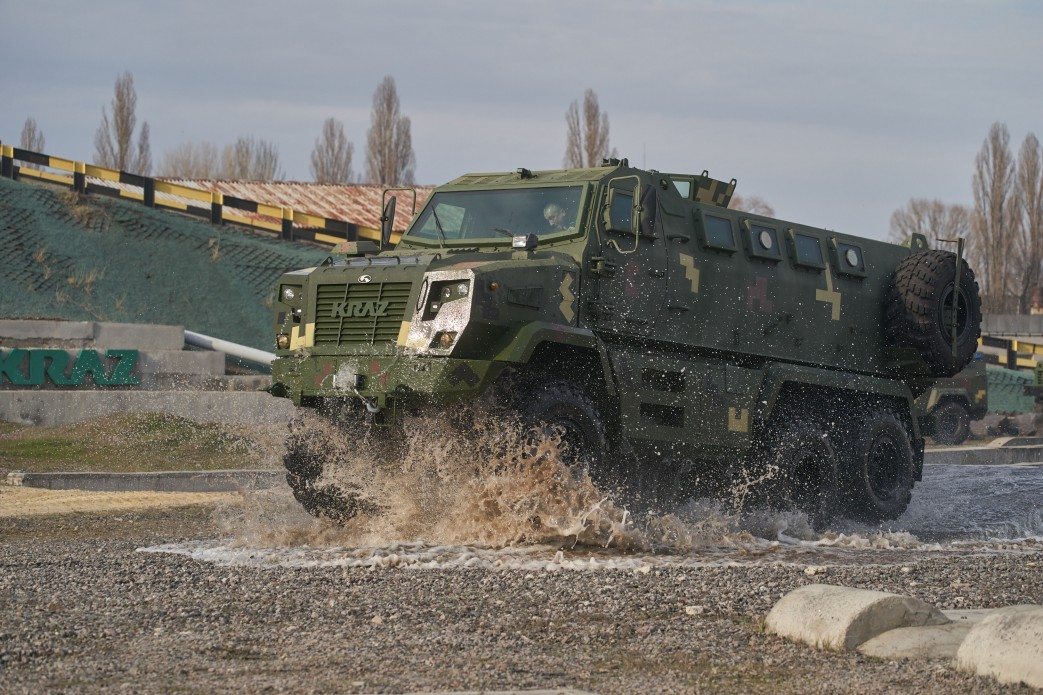
- A Fiona during driving tests.
- Type: MRAP
- Place of origin: Ukraine

Service history
- In service: 2014-present

Production history
- Designer: KrAZ
- Designed: Before 2015
- Produced: 2015-present(?)

Specifications
- Crew: 2 + 10 passengers
- Armor: Steel
- Engine: Turbocharged diesel 300-400 hp
- Suspension: 6x6

The Fiona is a Ukrainian 6x6 MRAP developed jointly between the UAE-based STREIT Group and the Ukraine-based KrAZ company. The vehicle is a further development of the earlier KrAZ Shrek One, and is named after the character of the same name in the 2001 animated film Shrek.

== History ==
The Fiona was first unveiled on August 28, 2015 at the International Defense Exhibition IDEX in the United Arab Emirates.

In 2016, the Ukrainian military began testing both the Shrek and the Fiona as possible future additions to their inventory.

== Design ==
The Fiona shares many characteristics with the Shrek One. It is essentially a lengthened 6x6 version of the Shrek.

The Fiona can also be equipped with a remotely controlled weapons station, armed with a 20mm autocannon and smoke grenade launchers.

== Operators ==
- Ukraine
- At least one undisclosed foreign buyer

== Gallery ==
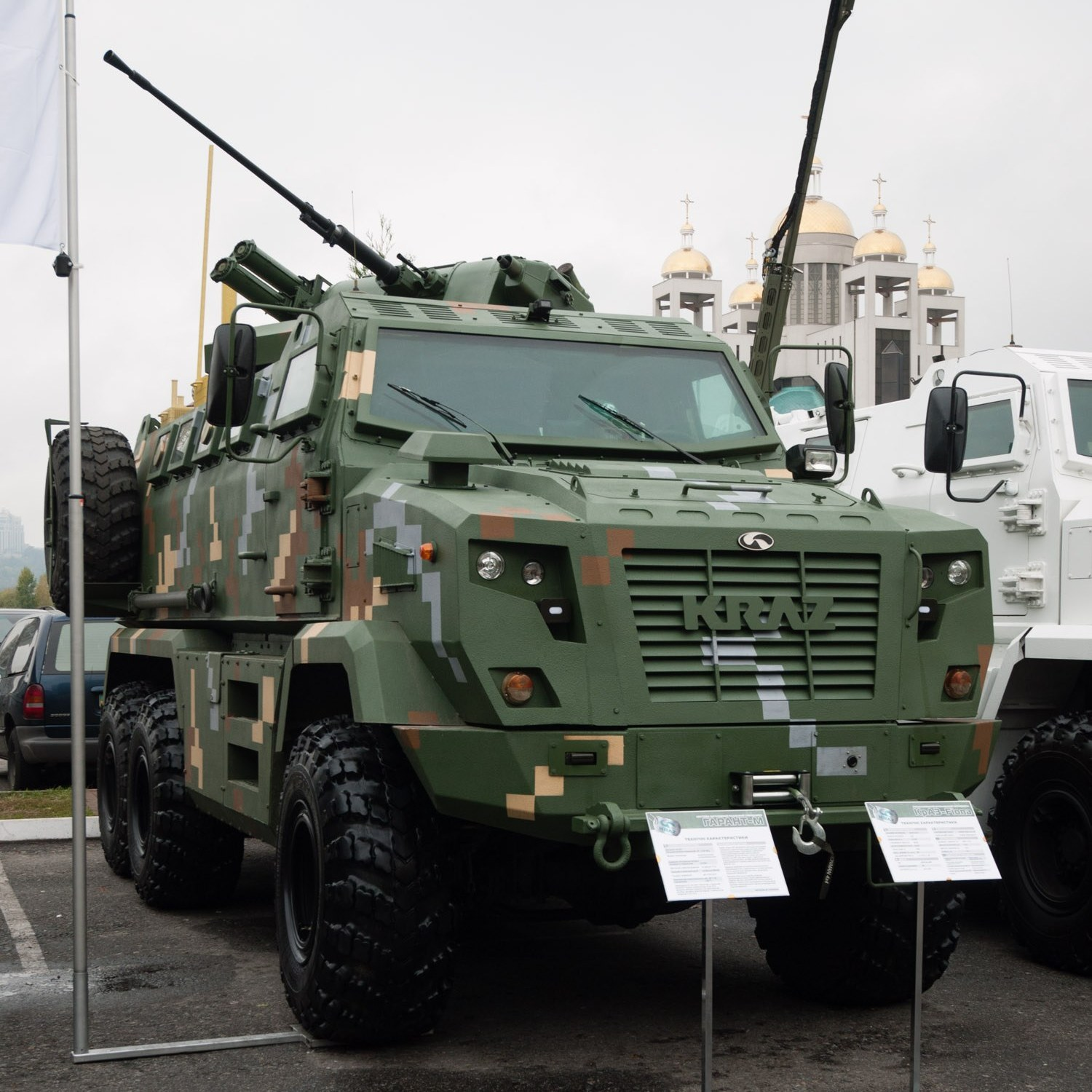
Front view.

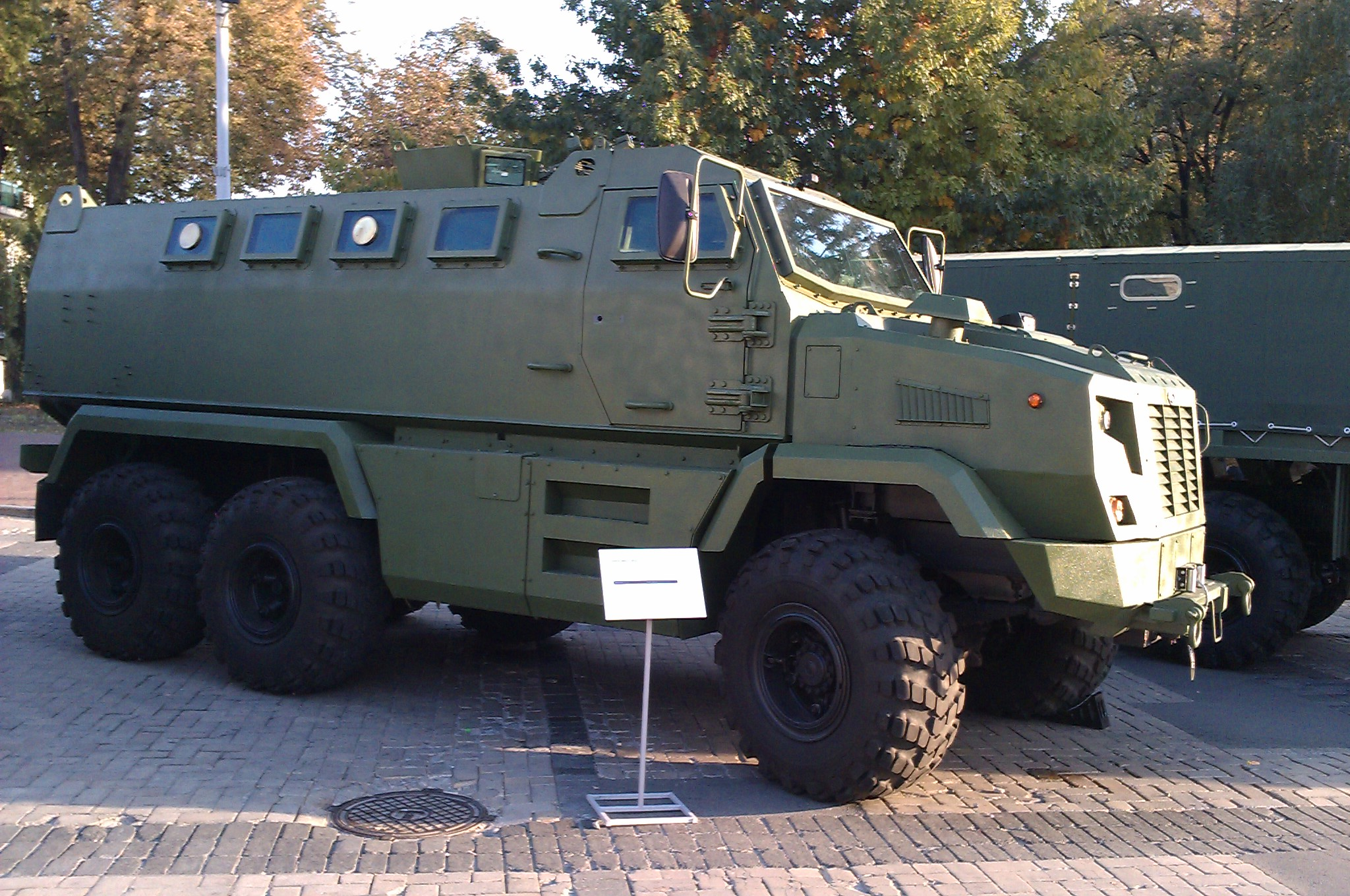
Side view.

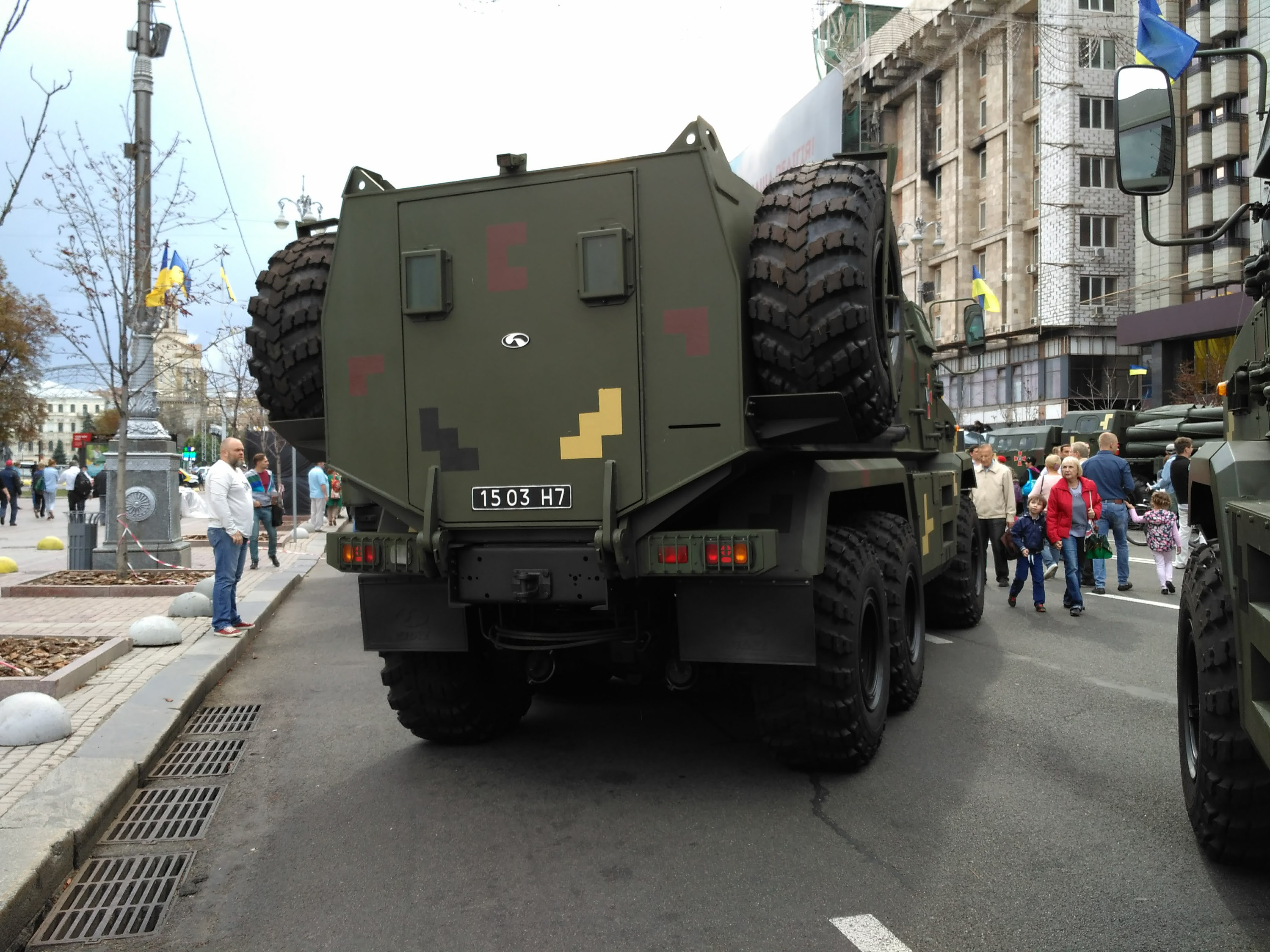
Rear view.

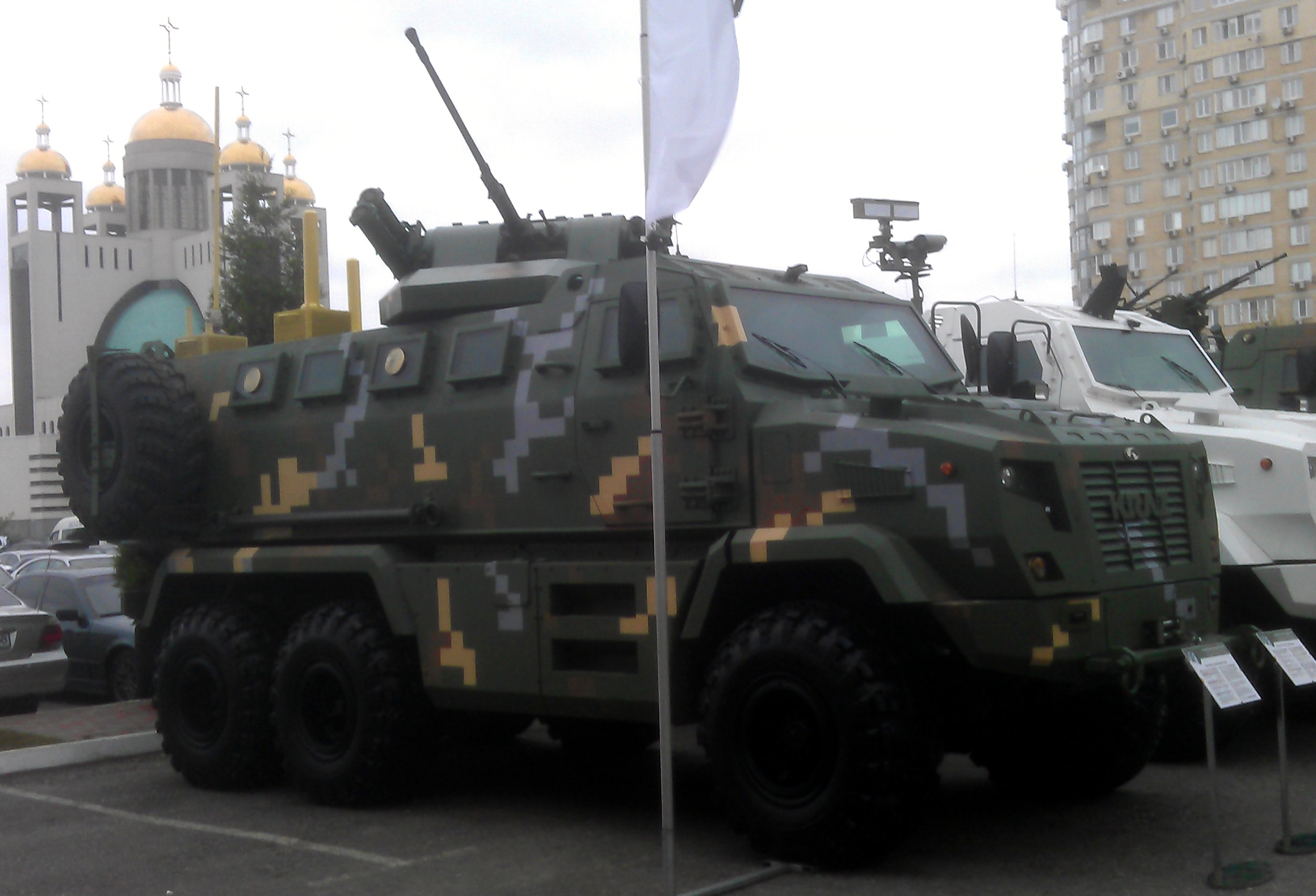
Fiona with autocannon turret.
