= KrAZ-5444 =

Overview
- Manufacturer: KrAZ
- Production: 1993–present

Body and chassis
- Class: Truck
- Body style: Truck

Powertrain
- Engine: YaMZ-238DE2 V8 diesel
- Transmission: (manual)

The KrAZ-5444 is a tractor unit manufactured at the KrAZ factory in Kremenchuk.

== Overview ==
The KrAZ-5444 has been serially produced since 1993. The truck is designed for towing semi-trailers with a gross weight of up to 28 tons on asphalt roads. The load on the fifth wheel does not exceed 9.3 tons.

The 5444 is equipped with an internal combustion engine YaMZ-238DE2 (Euro-2) with a power output of 330 PS and mechanical eight-speed transmission. At the request of the driver, it can be equipped with a preheater, a fifth wheel type JOST or George Fisher, the cab can be equipped with a sleeper and an additional heater.
