= KrAZ-5401 =

Ukrainian truck

КrAZ-5401
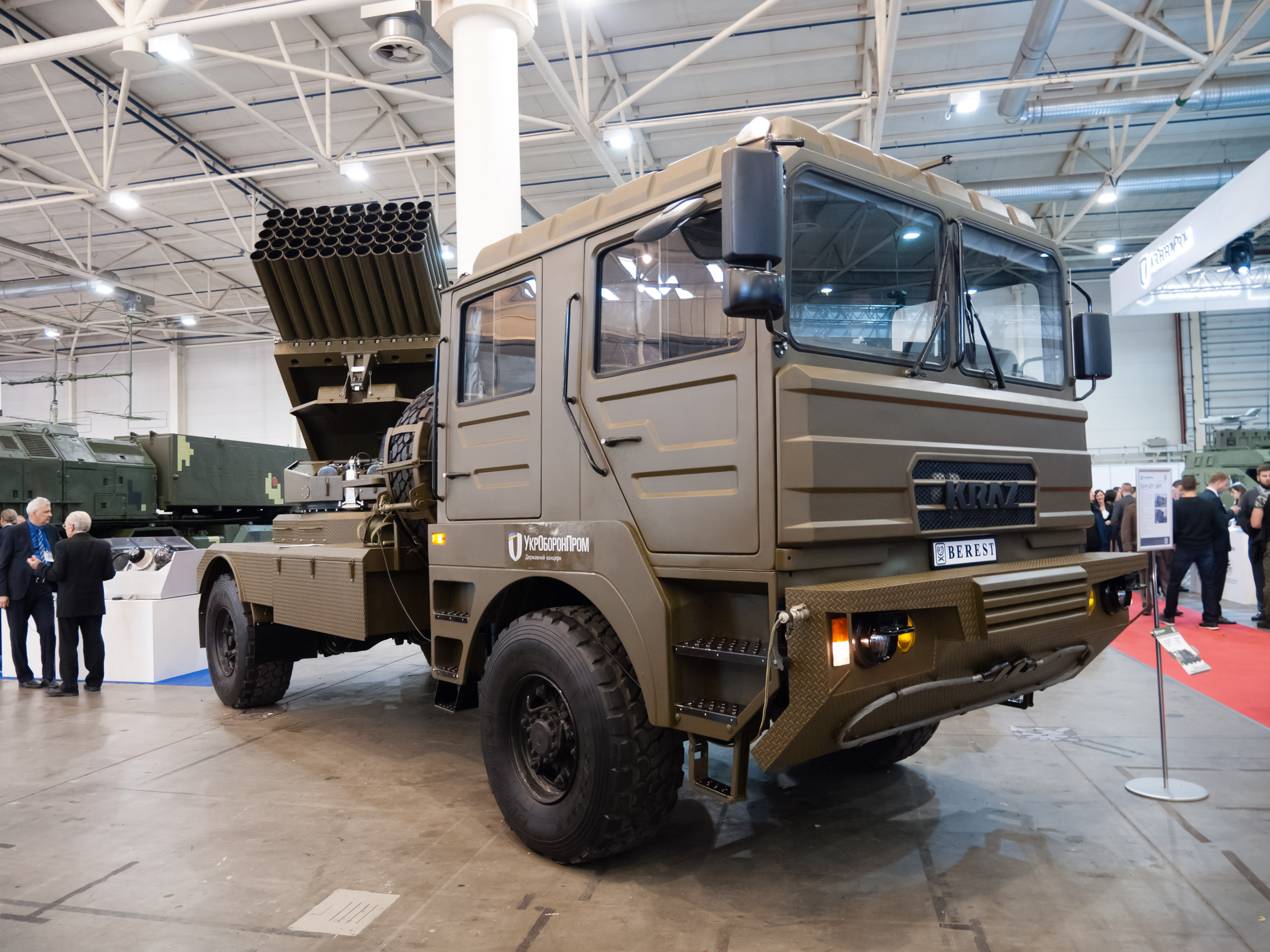

Overview
- Manufacturer: KrAZ
- Production: 2013-present

Body and chassis
- Class: Truck
- Body style: Truck
- Related: KrAZ H12.2

Powertrain
- Engine: 6.7L YaMZ-536 I6 diesel
- Transmission: 9-speed 9JS119TA manual

Dimensions
- Wheelbase: L1: 4200 mm L2: 4700 mm
- Length: L1: 7580 mm L2: 8000-8395 mm
- Width: 2500 mm
- Height: H1: 2960 mm (cabin MAN TGA); H2: 3130 mm (cabin Renault Kerax)

The KrAZ-5401 cabover truck is manufactured at the KrAZ plant in Ukraine. It was first presented in 2013.

KrAZ-5401 is provided engine YaMZ-536 rated at 312 hp, the MFZ-430 clutch and the 9JS119ТА mechanical transmission.

== Technical characteristics ==
- Engine: YaMZ-536 6.65-liter diesel straight-six (Euro IV)
- Power: 312 hp (229 kW)
- Torque: 1,230 N⋅m (907 lb⋅ft)
- Transmission: mechanical 9JS119ТА
- Clutch: single disk MFZ-430
- Axle configuration: 4x2
- Payload: 5.000-13.500 kg
