= KrAZ-5233 =

Ukrainian 4x4 truck

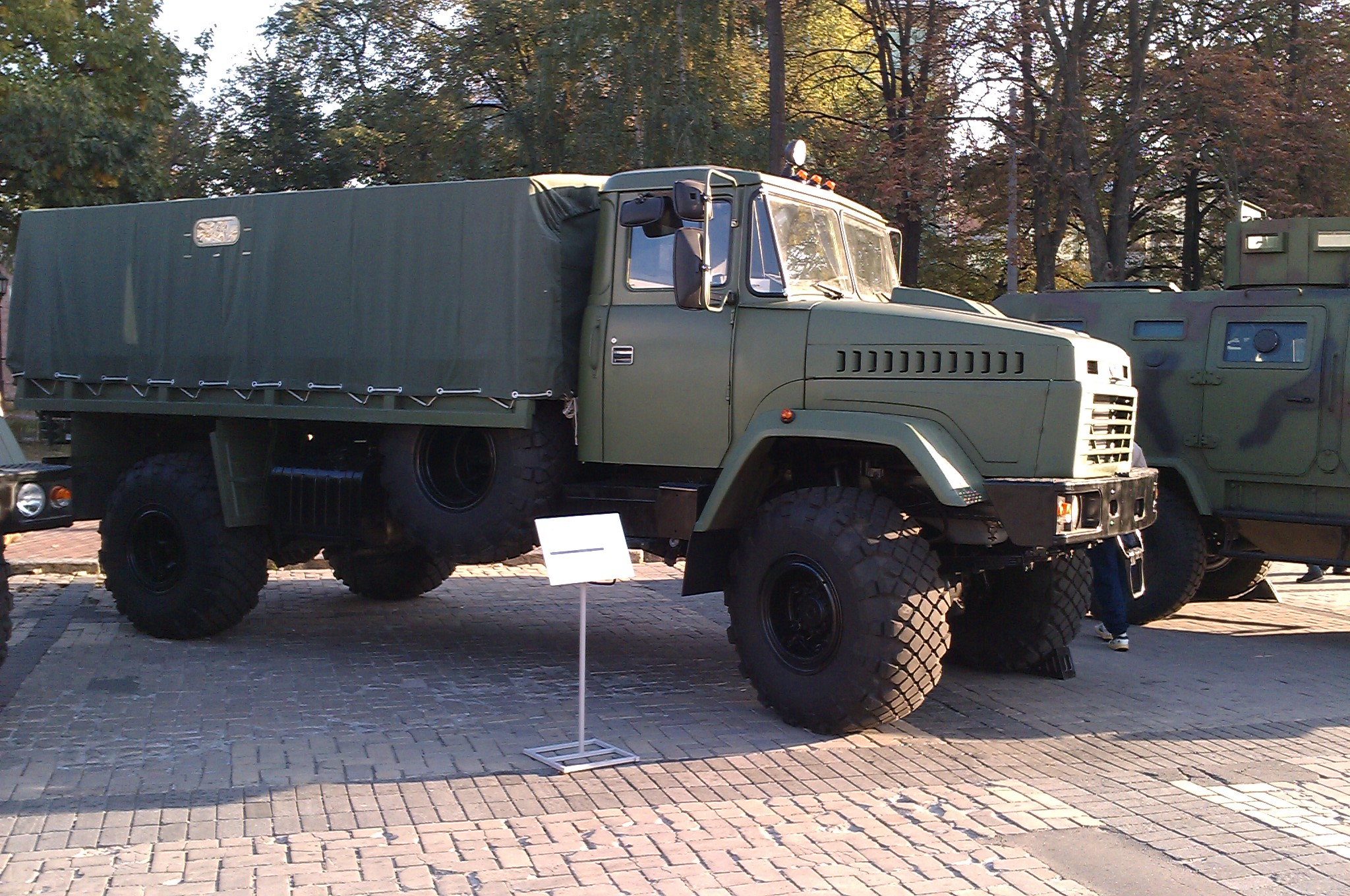

Overview
- Manufacturer: KrAZ
- Production: 2008–present

Body and chassis
- Class: Truck
- Body style: Truck
- Related: KrAZ-6322

Powertrain
- Transmission: (manual)

The KrAZ-5233 is an off-road truck 4x4 for extreme operations. It was first presented at the 2008 defence industry trade show in Kyiv. The 5322 is manufactured at the KrAZ plant in Ukraine.

== Technical characteristics ==
- Engine: 14.86 L diesel 8 cyl.
- Power: 330 PS (243 kW) /2400rpm
- Torque: 1225Nm /1225rpm
- Top speed: 85 mph

== Variants ==
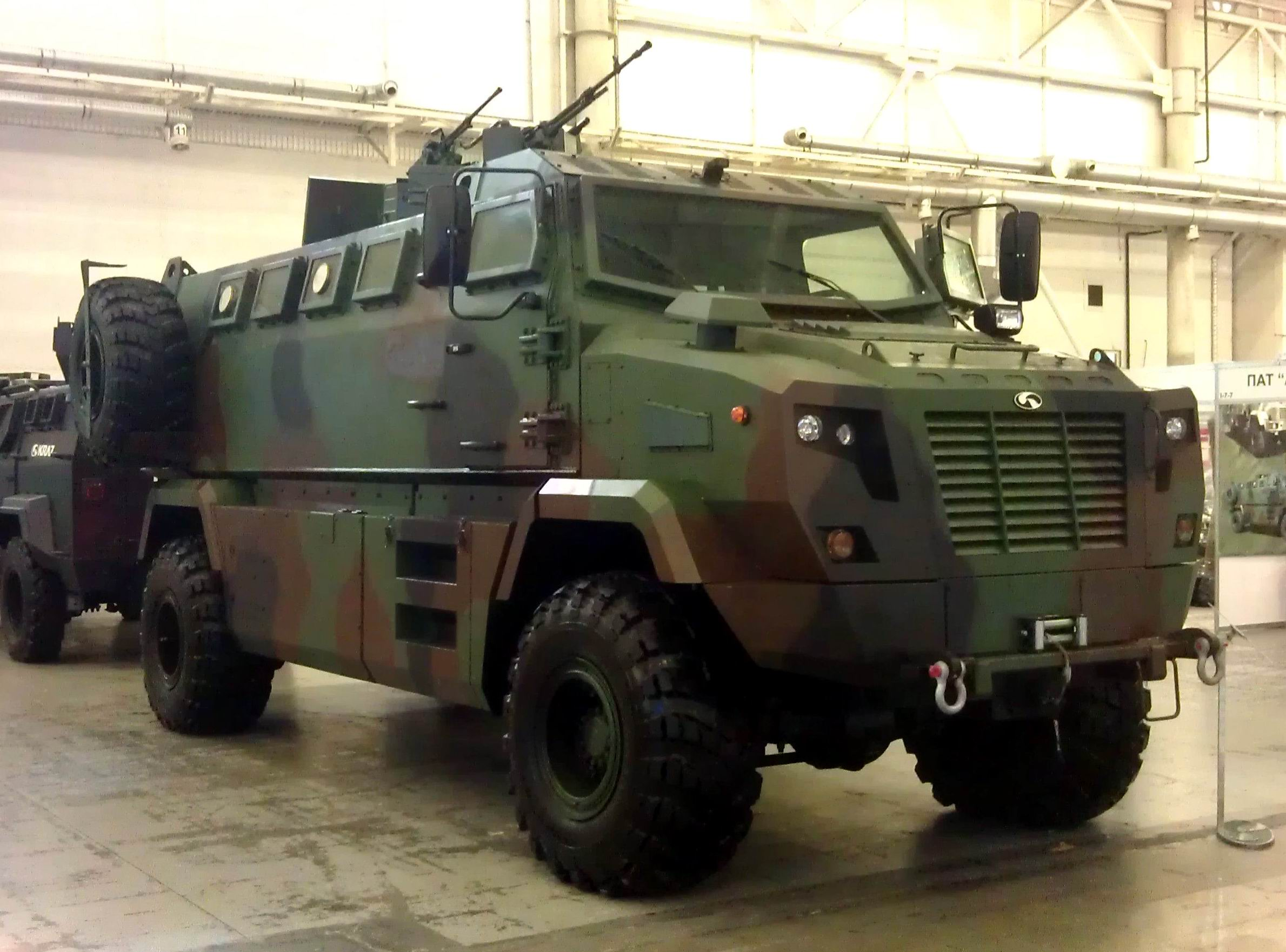
KrAZ Shrek. The Mine-Resistant Ambush Protected (MRAP) variant of the 5233.

- KrAZ-5233VE "Spetsnaz" (КрАЗ-5233ВЕ "Спецназ")
- KrAZ-5233 "Raptor"
- KrAZ-MPV Shrek One - armored mine protected vehicle designed by STREIT Group on KrAZ-5233 chassis

== Operators ==
=== Military operators ===
- Ukraine

- in August 2010 KrAZ-5233 was adopted as military truck for the Ukrainian Armed Forces
- in July 2014 National Guard of Ukraine received first five KrAZ-5233 trucks. In November 2014 extra 50 KrAZ-5233 trucks were ordered for National Guard of Ukraine

- Iran - trucks supplied in or before 2011

=== Civilian operators ===
- Nigeria - in 2008 100 KrAZ-5233 were sold to Nigerian police

== Sources ==
- Грузовые машины КРАЗ video (Private YouTube video)
