= KrAZ-260 =

Soviet off-road truck

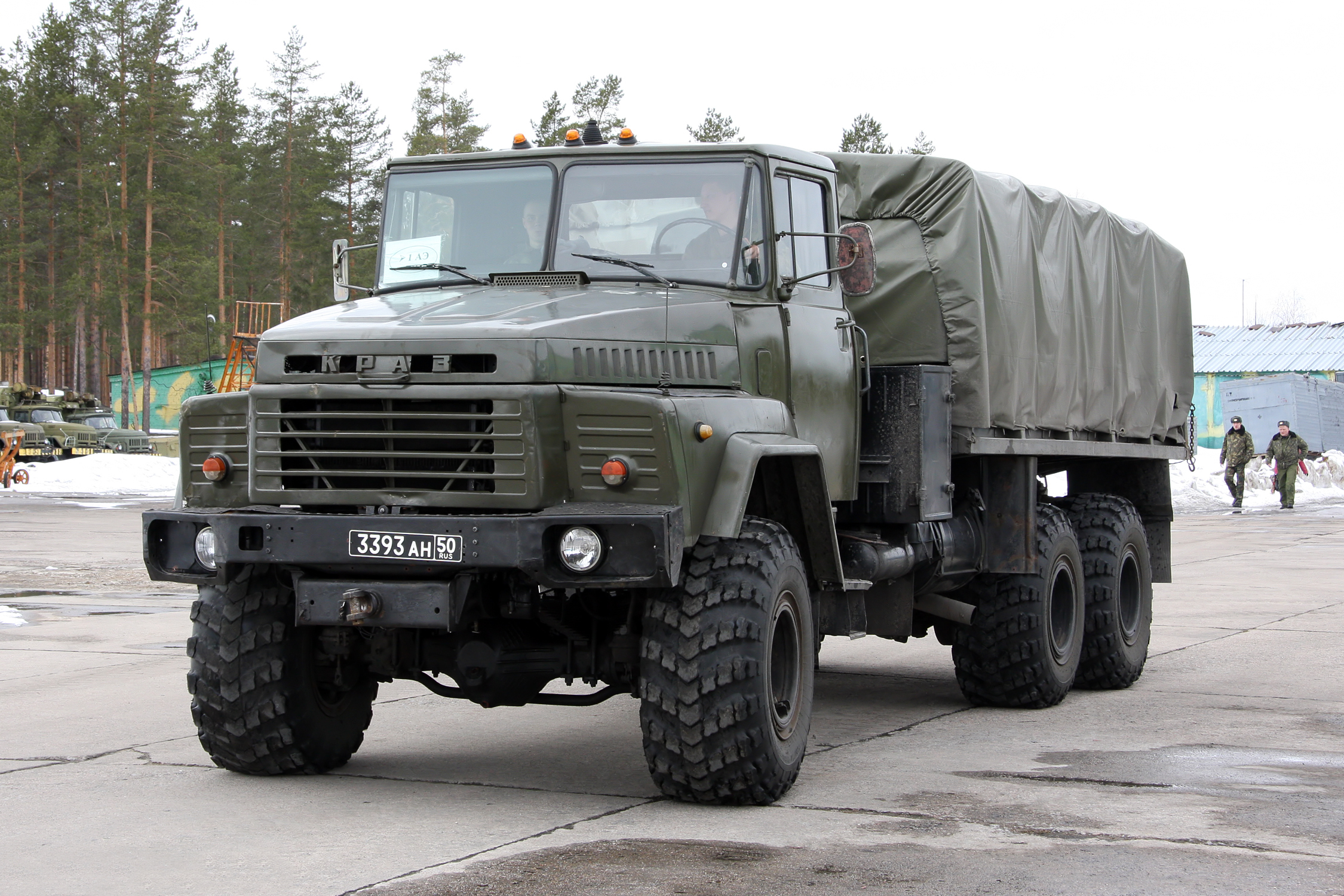

Overview
- Manufacturer: KrAZ
- Production: 1979–1993

Body and chassis
- Class: Truck
- Body style: Truck

Powertrain
- Engine: 14.9L YaMZ-238L V8 diesel
- Transmission: 4-speed YaMZ-238B manual + 2-speed transfer gearbox

Dimensions
- Wheelbase: 4600
- Length: 9030
- Width: 2720
- Height: 2985

Chronology
- Predecessor: KrAZ-255
- Successor: KrAZ-6322

The KrAZ-260 is an off-road truck 6x6 for extreme operations. It was manufactured at the KrAZ plant.

== Technical characteristics ==
- Engine: 14.86 L diesel 8 cyl.
- Power: 300 hp (221 kW) /2100rpm
- Torque: 1079Nm /1500rpm
- Transmission: Eight forward and two reverse gears, additional two-stage off-road reduction in the transfer case
- Top speed: 80 km/h
- Tank capacity: 2×165 l +50 l reserve
- Fuel consumption at a constant 50 km/h: 34 l/100 km
- Range: 1000 km
- Maximum gradient: 58 %
- Wading ability: 1.2 m
- Braking distance from 40 km/h: 17.2 m
- Drive formula: 6×6

Dimensions and weights

- Length: 9030 mm
- Width: 2720 mm
- Height: 2985 mm
- Wheelbase: 4600+1400 mm
- Track width: 2160 mm
- Ground clearance: 370 mm
- Turning circle: 26 m
- Unladen weight: 12,775 kg
- Permissible total weight: 22,000 kg
- Payload: 9000 kg
- Maximum towing capacity: 30,000 kg (road), 10,000 kg (off-road)

== Variants ==
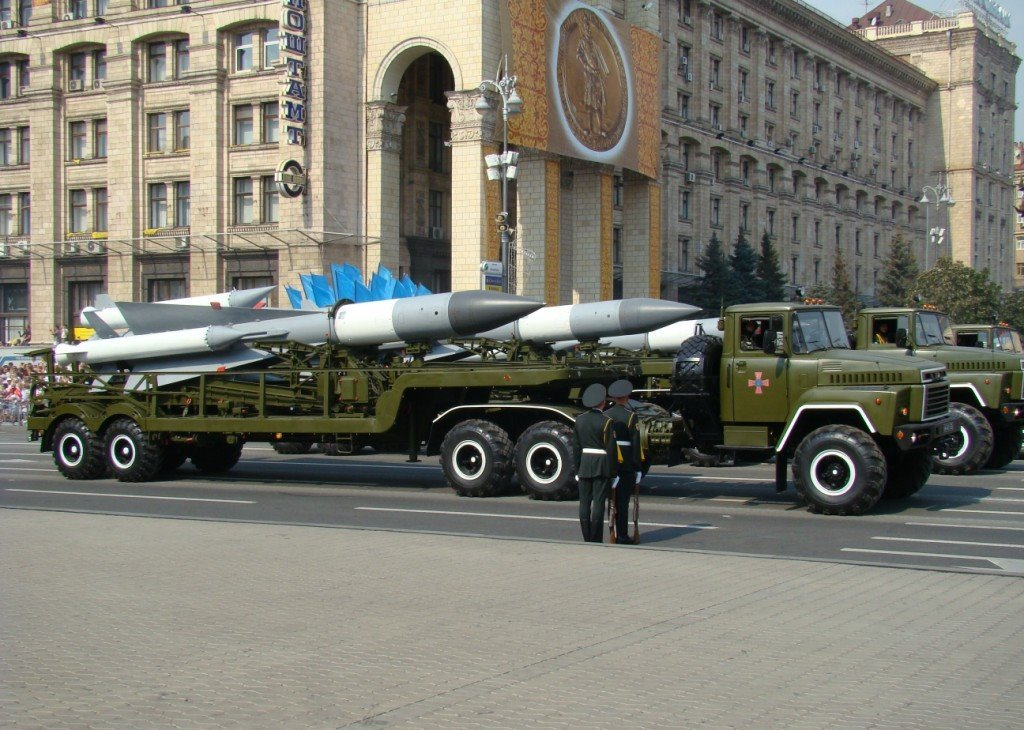
KrAZ-260V on military parade (Kyiv, August 2008)

- KrAZ-260 (КрАЗ-260) - 9-ton cargo truck
- KrAZ-260A - version with YaMZ-238N diesel engine, no fuel pumps and an additional fuel tank
- KrAZ-260V (КрАЗ-260В) - tractor unit
- KrAZ-260G (КрАЗ-260Г) - long wheelbase version
- KrAZ-260D - experimental tractor version for road train
- KrAZ-260L - experimental logging truck, similar to the KrAZ-255L1
- KrAZ-6437 (КрАЗ-6437) - 30-ton log truck

=== Vehicles based on KrAZ-260 ===
- ATs-10-260 (АЦ-10-260) - fuel tanker on KrAZ-260 chassis
- BM-21K (БМ-21К) - BM-21 Grad on KrAZ-260 chassis
- EOV-4422 (ЭОВ-4422) - military excavator on KrAZ-260 chassis
- ТММ-3M1 - bridgelayer on KrAZ-260 chassis, since 1988
- KrAZ-260 "Tornado" (КрАЗ-260 "Торнадо") - riot control vehicle with water cannon on KrAZ-260 chassis. Two vehicles were built for Internal Troops of Ukraine

== Operators ==
=== Current operators ===
- Greece
- Serbia
- Ukraine

- Armed Forces of Ukraine
- Ministry of Internal Affairs - in March 2015 one KrAZ-260 armored guntruck was built for "Sokol" rapid response police unit

=== Former operators ===
- Soviet Union
- Belarus - Armed Forces of Belarus
- German Democratic Republic - National People's Army
- Egypt - Egyptian Armed Forces
- India - 300 KrAZ-260 military trucks were sold to Indian Armed Forces
- DPRK
