= KrAZ-7140 =

КrAZ-7140

Overview
- Manufacturer: KrAZ
- Also called: KrAZ H30.1E
- Production: 2004-present

Body and chassis
- Class: Truck

Powertrain
- Engine: YaMZ-6581.10
- Transmission: Manual

Dimensions
- Wheelbase: 5,000 mm (200 in)+1,400 mm (55 in)+1,600 mm (63 in)
- Length: 11,600 mm (460 in)
- Width: 2,540 mm (100 in)
- Height: 3,030 mm (119 in)

The KrAZ H30.1E or KrAZ 7140H6 is an off-road truck manufactured at the KrAZ plant in Ukraine. It was first presented in 2004.

KrAZ H30.1E is provided engine YaMZ-6581.10 rated at 400-420 hp, the YaMZ-184 clutch and the YaMZ-2391 mechanical transmission.

== Technical characteristics ==
- Engine: YaMZ-6581.10
- Power: 400 PS (294 kW) /1900 rpm
- Transmission: mechanical YaMZ-2391
- Clutch: single disk YaMZ-184
- Axle configuration: 8x6
- Tires: 445/65R22,5
- Payload: 30,000 kg (66,000 lb)
