= KrAZ-7634 =

Ukrainian 8x8 off-road truck

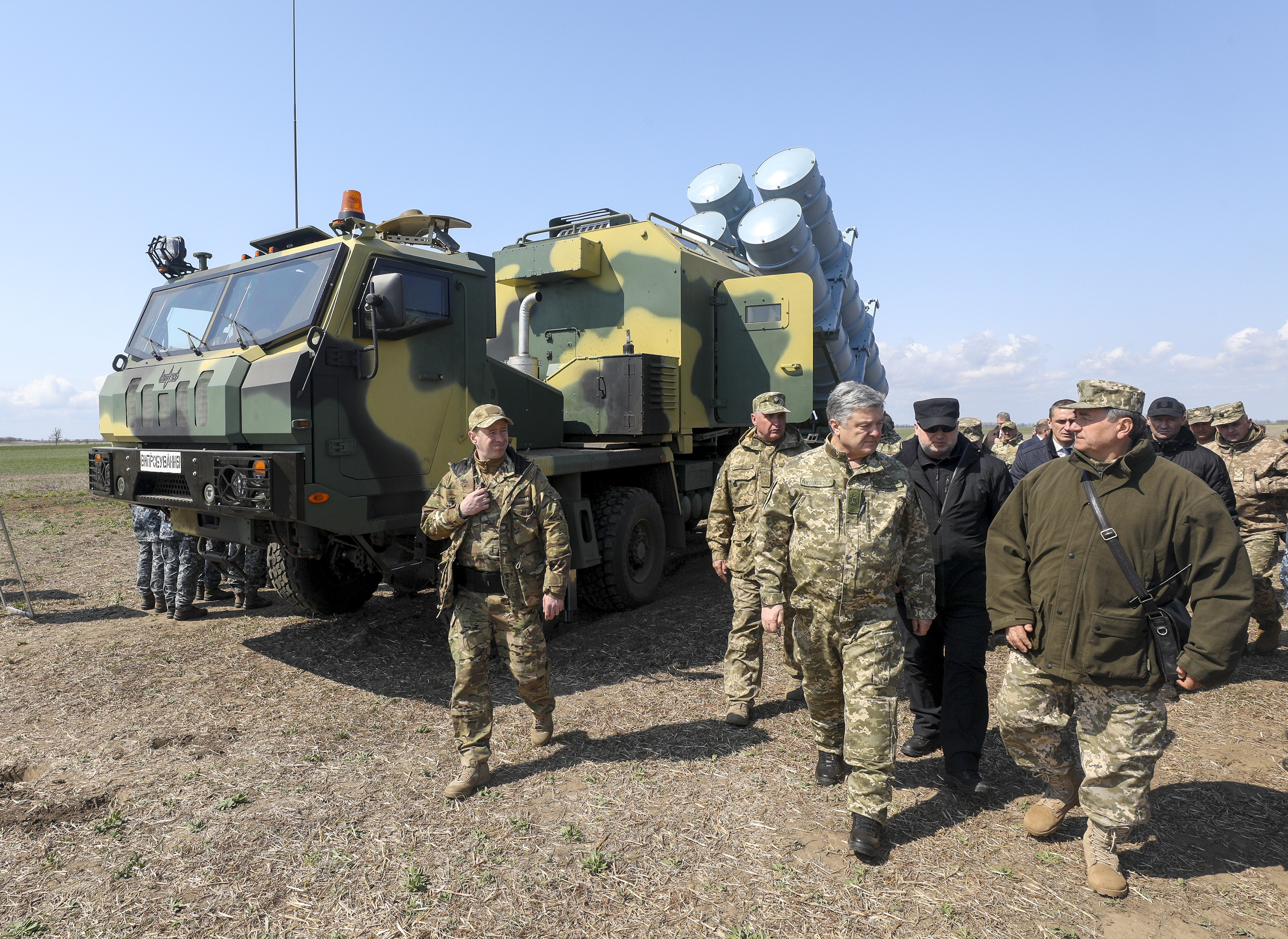

Overview
- Manufacturer: KrAZ
- Also called: KrAZ H27.3EX
- Production: 2014-present

Body and chassis
- Class: Truck
- Body style: Truck

Powertrain
- Engine: 14.9L YaMZ-7511.10 V8 diesel
- Transmission: 9-speed YaMZ-2391-53 manual

Dimensions
- Length: 11,830 mm (466 in)
- Height: 2,800 mm (110 in)

The KrAZ H27.3EX or KrAZ 7634HE off-road truck 8x8 is manufactured at the KrAZ plant in Ukraine. It was first presented in the 2014 year.

KrAZ 7634HE is provided engine YaMZ-7511.10 rated at 400 hp, the YaMZ-184 clutch and the YaMZ-2391-53 mechanical transmission.

First and second axles are steerable, all the axles are driving.

== Technical characteristics ==
- Engine: YaMZ-7511.10 14.86 L diesel V8 cyl. (Euro 3III)
- Power: 400 PS (294 kW) /1900 rpm
- Torque: 1715 Nm /1100-1300 rpm
- Transmission: mechanical YaMZ-2391-53
- Clutch: single disk YaMZ-184
- Minimum turning radius: 14 m
- Axle configuration: 8x8
- Tires: 445/65R22,5
- Payload: 27,000 kg
