= KrAZ =

Automobile factory in Kremenchuk, Ukraine

Kremenchuk Automobile Plant KrAZ or AvtoKrAZ

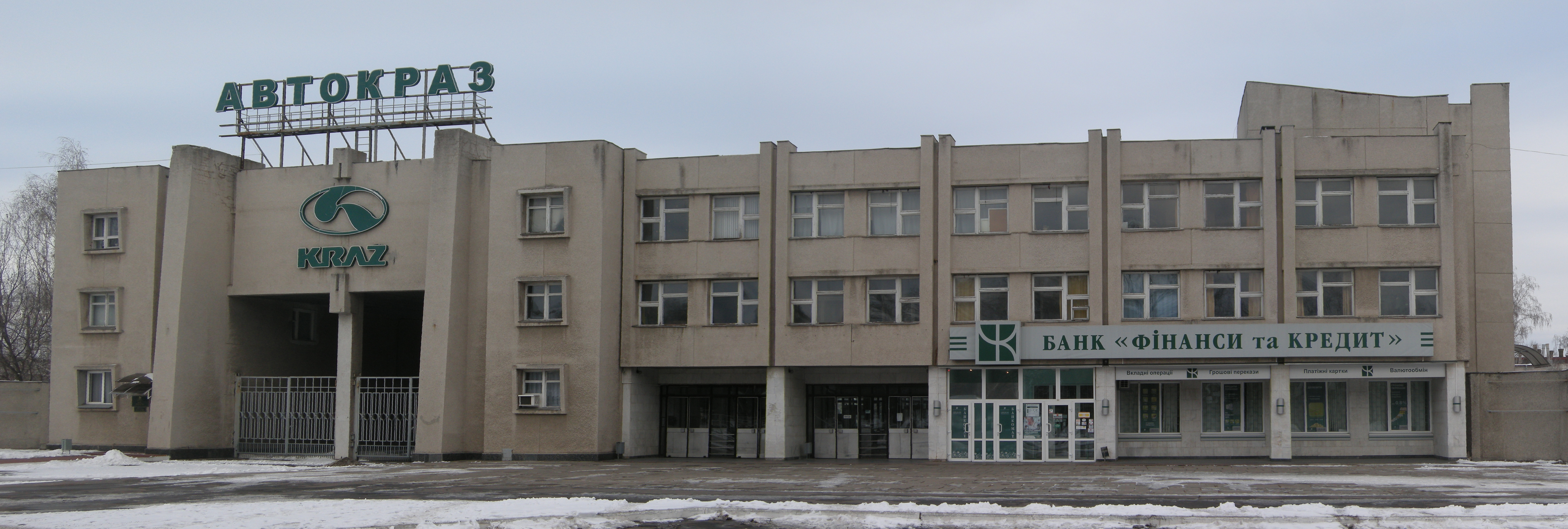
- Central entrance to the KrAZ plant
- Native name: Kremenchutskyi Avtomobilnyi Zavod
- Type: Privately held company
- Industry: Automobile manufacturing
- Founded: 1946
- Headquarters: Kremenchuk, Ukraine
- Area served: Worldwide
- Products: Trucks
- Owner: State owned
- Number of employees: 3,269 (2017)
- Parent: KrAZ Holding Company
- Website: www.autokraz.com.ua

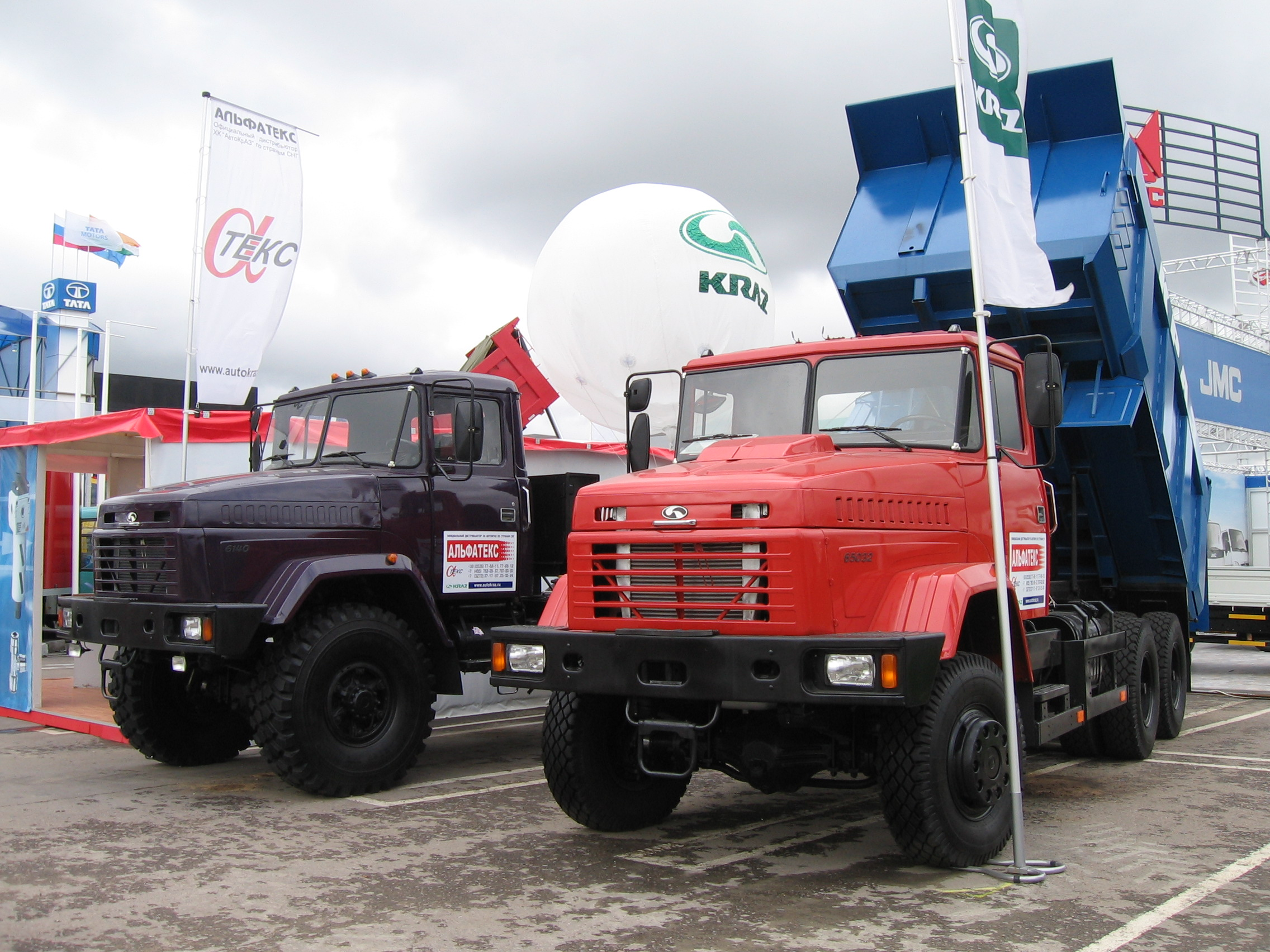
KrAZ-6140TE semi-trailer truck (left) and KrAZ-65032 dump truck (right) at a 2006 show

KrAZ (Ukrainian: Кременчуцький Автомобільний Завод, Kremenchutskyi Avtomobilnyi Zavod, Kremenchuk Automobile Plant, also Ukrainian: АвтоКрА́З, AvtoKrAZ) is a factory in Kremenchuk, Ukraine, that produces trucks and other special-purpose vehicles, particularly heavy-duty off-road models. The factory was incorporated as a holding company combining several other factories nationwide and becoming the industrial wing of the finance-industrial group Finance and Credit, which also held the Finance and Credit bank. On November 6, 2022, the government of President Volodymyr Zelenskyy used martial law to nationalise the company.

== History ==
=== Soviet era ===
KrAZ was founded on 31 August 1945 when the People's Commissariat for Transportation Routes issued a warrant to build a mechanical bridge plant in Kremenchuk. The first brick was laid in the plant foundation in 1946 and during the next eight years it produced about 600 bridges with the total length of about 27 km for use on the Dnieper, Moscow, Dniester, Volga and Daugava rivers etc. In 1956 the plant has manufactured combine harvesters and other farming machines. The Kremenchuk Combine Plant has produced 11,000 agricultural machines in the first two years of its existence.

On April 17, 1958, the Central Committee of the Communist Party of the Soviet Union decided to rebuild a plant for heavy-duty vehicle production. Heavy-duty truck manufacture was transferred from the Yaroslavl Motor Plant (YaAZ). The first two KrAZ-222 dump trucks were assembled from imported units and components on 10 April 1959, and by 1961 the plant exported over 500 vehicles in 26 countries of the world such as Argentina, Afghanistan, Bulgaria, China, India, Vietnam etc.

On December 30, 1968, 100,000th truck was assembled at the KrAZ main assembly plant

On January 26, 1971, KrAZ was awarded the Order of Lenin for completion of the five-year plan ahead of schedule and successful developments of new truck models. On January 15, 1976, the plant became "AvtoKrAZ".

On April 30, 1984, 500,000th truck was assembled at the KrAZ main assembly plant.

By 1986 the KrAZ's yearly production output totalled 30655 vehicles.

1990 the KrAZ's yearly production output totalled 27667 trucks. 1991 the KrAZ's yearly production output totalled 25094 trucks.

=== Ukrainian era ===
In March 1993 750,000th truck was assembled at the KrAZ main assembly plant.

KrAZ was registered as a Holding company in June 1996. 1996 the company's yearly production output totalled 1919 trucks.

In 1999, the privatization of KrAZ began. 1999 the company's yearly production output totalled 827 trucks

In 2001, a block of stock being purchased by a joint Ukrainian-German enterprise called Mega-Motors.

In 2003, KrAZ opened vehicle assembly plants in Russia and Vietnam. In 2004 KrAZ was awarded an order for 2200 KrAZ vehicles to be delivered to Iraq. KrAZ received an ISO 9001:2000 for quality control.

On January 27, 2006, the 800,000th truck was assembled at the KrAZ main assembly plant. In October of the same year KrAZ won first prize among 100 Ukrainian companies with the best rate of development according to the net profit growth pursuant to the results of rating "Top 100 Most dynamic companies"

In 2007, the company's yearly production output totalled 4206 trucks

After the 2008 financial crisis, orders for vehicles declined drastically as Ukraine was severely affected by the event, the factory worked at minimal capacity. 2009 the company's yearly production output totalled 280 trucks

In 2010, the company's yearly production output totalled 1002 trucks

On August 23, 2011, the KrAZ-5233 "Spetsnaz" entered into service with the Ukrainian Army.

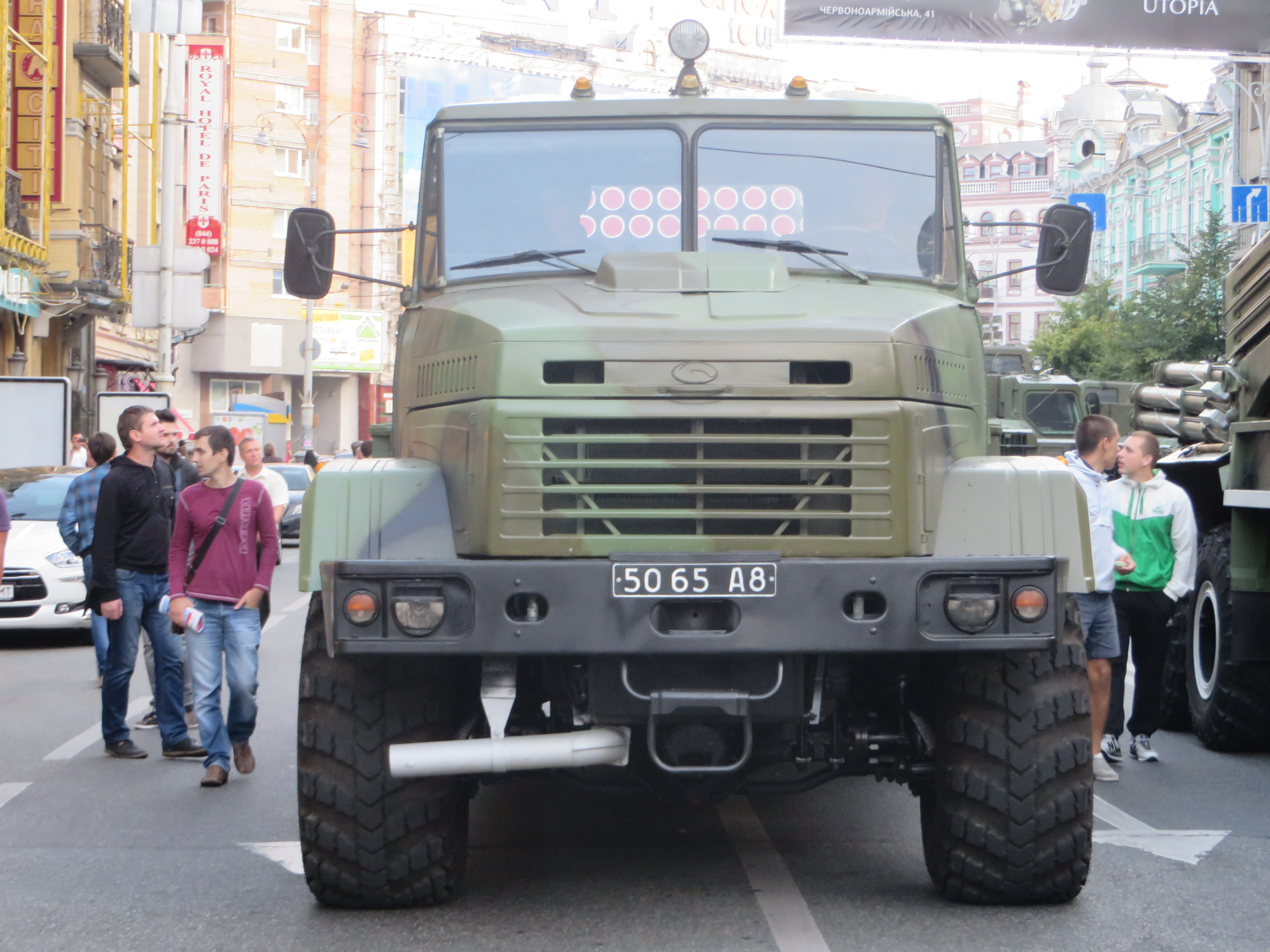
KrAZ-6322RA Bastion-01

In 2013, the company's yearly production output totalled 891 trucks.

The government of Ukraine placed large orders for new military vehicles. The Border Guards, National Guard, and Army of Ukraine have all been scheduled to receive new KrAZ armored trucks. Moreover, KrAZ partnered with the Canadian defense firm Streit Group to produce the Cougar and Spartan armored vehicles. A total of 21 Spartans were ordered with the Ministry of Defense having an option for an additional 40, 20 Cougars were also ordered.

Several Streit Group Spartan APC's were seen at the Kyiv independence day parade indicating that the order was at least partially complete.

In November 2014, the Ukrainian government placed an order for 1200 vehicles and 200 armored personnel carriers. The contract was worth ₴1 billion ($64,267,360.00).

On 19 May 2021, KrAZ signed a three-year contract to supply the United States Army Contracting Command with KrAZ 4x4 heavy-duty vehicles and spare parts.

== 2022 Nationalisation ==
On November 6, 2022, the government of President Volodymyr Zelenskyy used martial law to nationalise the company. “Such steps, which are necessary for our country in conditions of war, are carried out in accordance with current laws and will help meet the urgent needs of our defense sector.” The government of Ukraine also took control of engine maker Motor Sich, energy companies Ukrnafta and Ukrtatnafta and transformer maker Zaporozhtransformator at the same time.

== Products ==
=== Civil vehicles ===
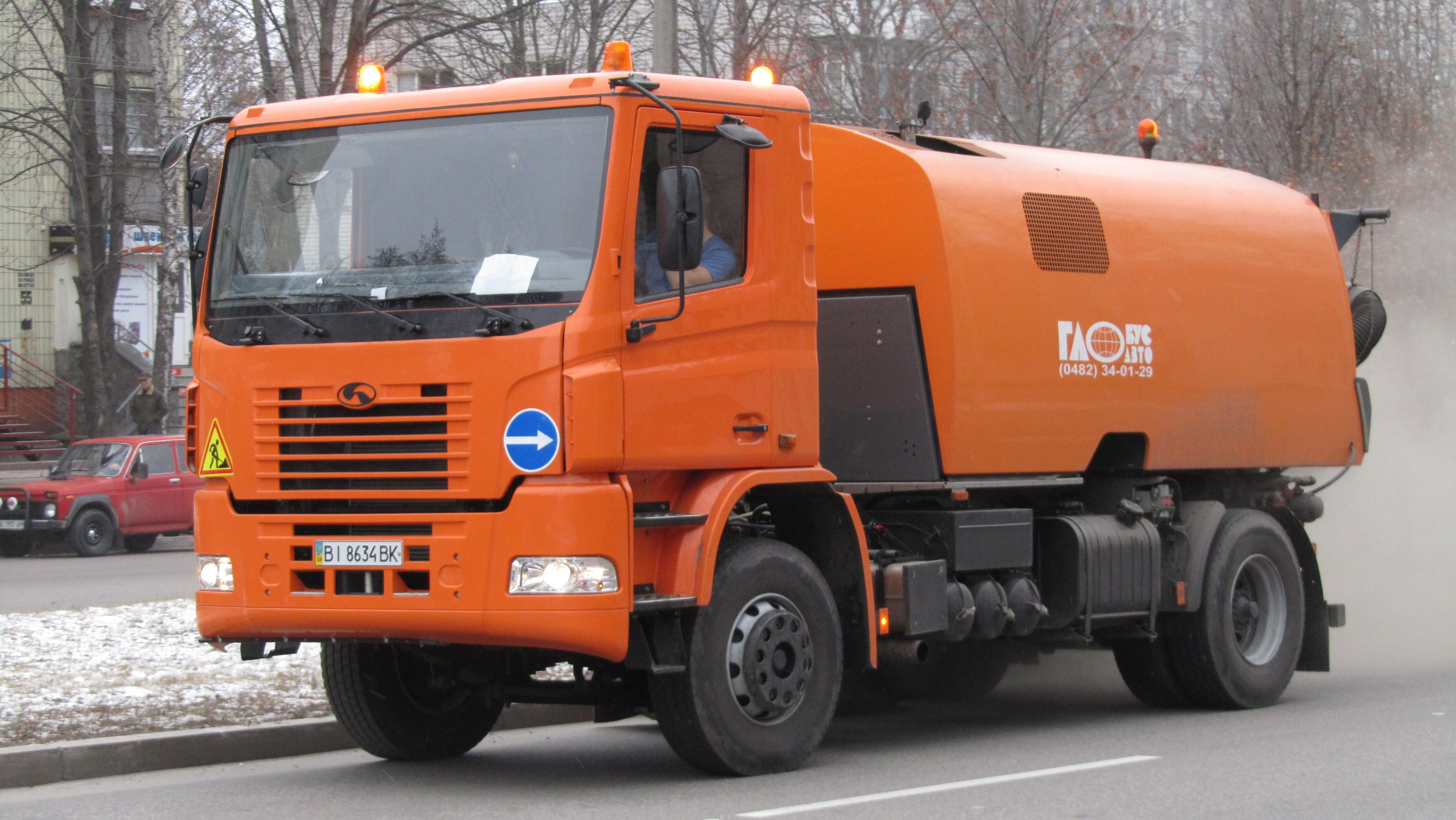
KrAZ-K12.2

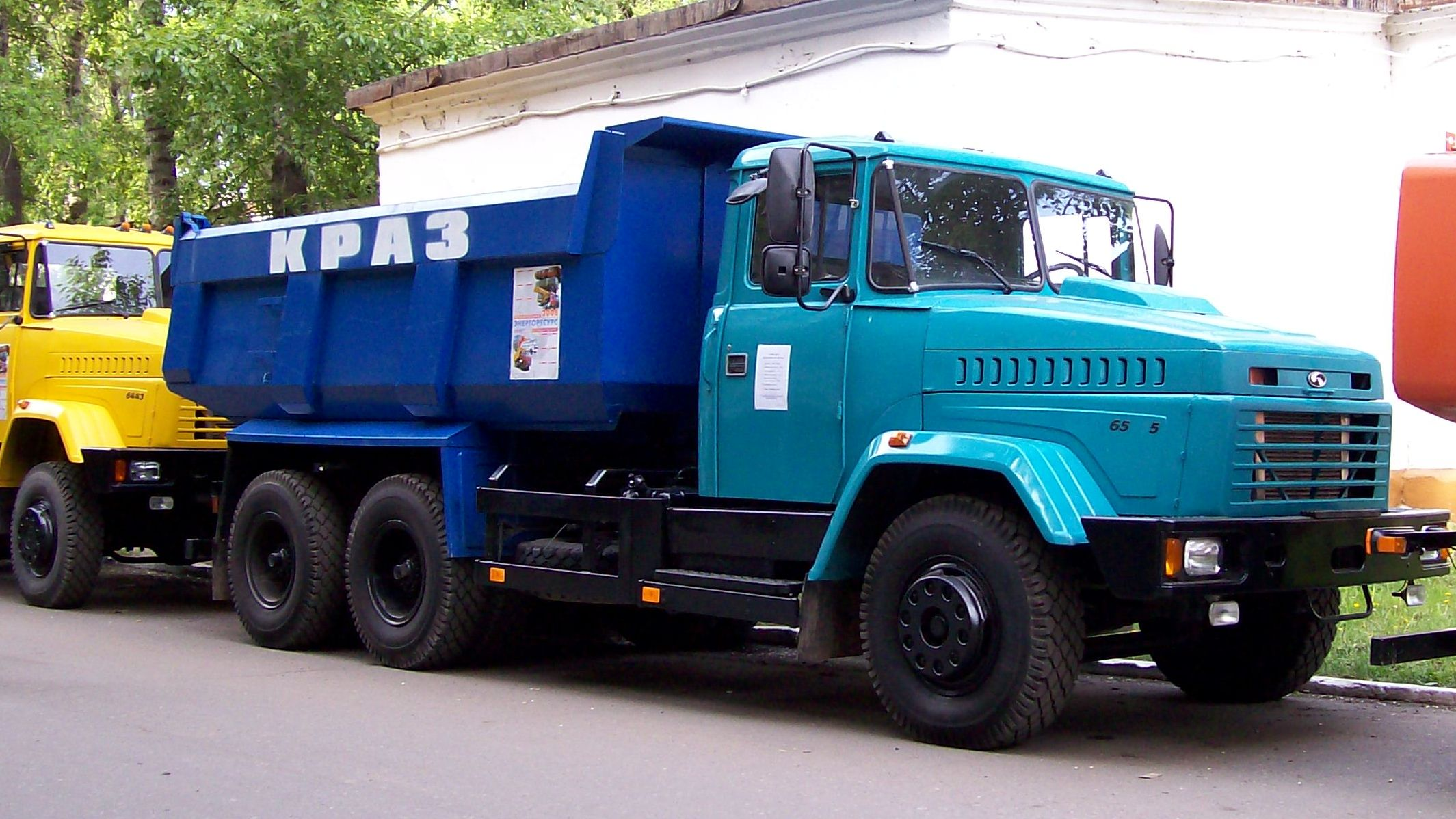
KrAZ-6505

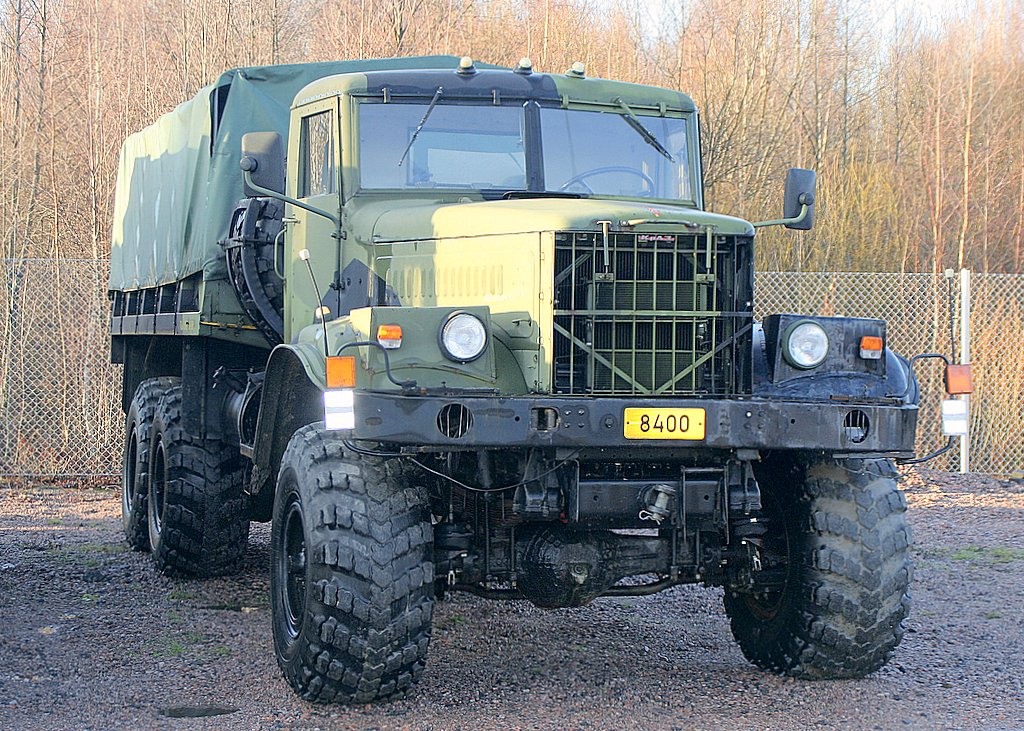
A KrAZ-255B, Finnish Defence Forces, used also as a vehicle for the PMP Floating Bridges

- KrAZ-214 – 6×6 cargo truck, two-stroke diesel engine
- KrAZ-219 – 6×4, two-stroke diesel engine
- KrAZ-222 – 6×4 dump truck, two-stroke diesel engine
- KrAZ-250 – 6×4
- KrAZ-255 – 6×6 cargo truck, four-stroke diesel
- KrAZ-256 – 6×4 dump truck, four-stroke diesel
- KrAZ-260 – 6×6
- KrAZ-5133B2 – 4×2 – 330 hp (246 kW)
- KrAZ-5401 – 4×2 – 312 hp (233 kW)
- KrAZ-6510 – 4×4 or 6×4 – 240 hp (179 kW) engine
- KrAZ-65055 – 6×6 – 330 hp (246 kW) engine
- KrAZ-65032 – all-wheel drive 6×6 dump trucks – 330 hp (246 kW)
- KrAZ-6130С4 – all-wheel drive 6×6 dump trucks – 330 hp (246 kW)
- KrAZ-7133С4 – 4-axle (8×4) dump trucks
- KrAZ-7140 – 4-axle (8×6)
- KrAZ-65053 – 330 hp (246 kW)
- KrAZ-7634 – all-wheel drive 8×8 – 400 hp (298 kW)
- KrAZ V12.2MEH – 6×6 – ?

=== Chassis ===
These are designed to be fitted with various body equipment for paved and dirt road use.

- KrAZ-257 – 6×4, four-stroke diesel
- KrAZ-5133H2 – 4×2 – 330 hp (246 kW)
- KrAZ-5233H2 – 4×2 – 330 hp (246 kW)
- KrAZ-5233HE type 1 and 2 – 4×4 330 hp (246 kW) (off-road use)
- KrAZ-6322 type 1, 2 and 3 – 6×6 – 330 hp (246 kW)
  - KrAZ-63221 type 2 – 6×6 – 330 hp (246 kW) (off-road use)
  - KrAZ-63221 type 3 – 6×6 – 330 hp (246 kW)
- KrAZ-65053 – 6×4 – 330 hp (246 kW)
- KrAZ-65101 – 6×4 – 240 hp (179 kW)
- KrAZ-7133H4 – 8×4 – 330 hp (246 kW)
- KrAZ-7140H6 – 8×6 – 400 hp (298 kW) (off-road use)
- KrAZ H12.2 – 4×2 – 312 hp (233 kW)
- KrAZ Н23.2 – 6×4 – 362 hp (270 kW)
  - KrAZ Н23.2M – 6×4 – 362 hp (270 kW)
  - KrAZ Н23.2R – 6×4 – 362 hp (270 kW)

=== Semi-tractors ===
- KrAZ-221 – 6×4, two-stroke diesel engine
- KrAZ-250V
- KrAZ-255V
- KrAZ-258 – 6×4, four-stroke diesel
- KrAZ-5444 – 2-axle – 330 hp (246 kW)
- KrAZ-6140TE – 3-axle – 400 hp (298 kW)
- KrAZ-6443 – 3-axle
- KrAZ-6444 – 3-axle
- KrAZ-64431 – 3-axle

=== Military vehicles ===
- KrAZ-5233BE 4×4 – 330 hp (246 kW)
- KrAZ-6322 6×6 – 330 hp (246 kW)
- KrAZ-6135B6 6×6 – 350 hp (261 kW)
- KrAZ-6446 6×6 – 330 hp (246 kW)

=== Special-purpose vehicles ===
- KrAZ-255L – timber truck
- KrAZ-256B1-030 - Chernobyl liquidator vehicle
- KrAZ-6133M6 – timber truck
- KrAZ-64372 – timber truck
- KrAZ-6233R4 – concrete mixer truck
- KrAZ-6333R4 – concrete mixer truck
- KrAZ-7133R4 – concrete mixer truck
- KrAZ-65055DM – dump truck/snow plow (municipal)

=== Armored vehicles ===
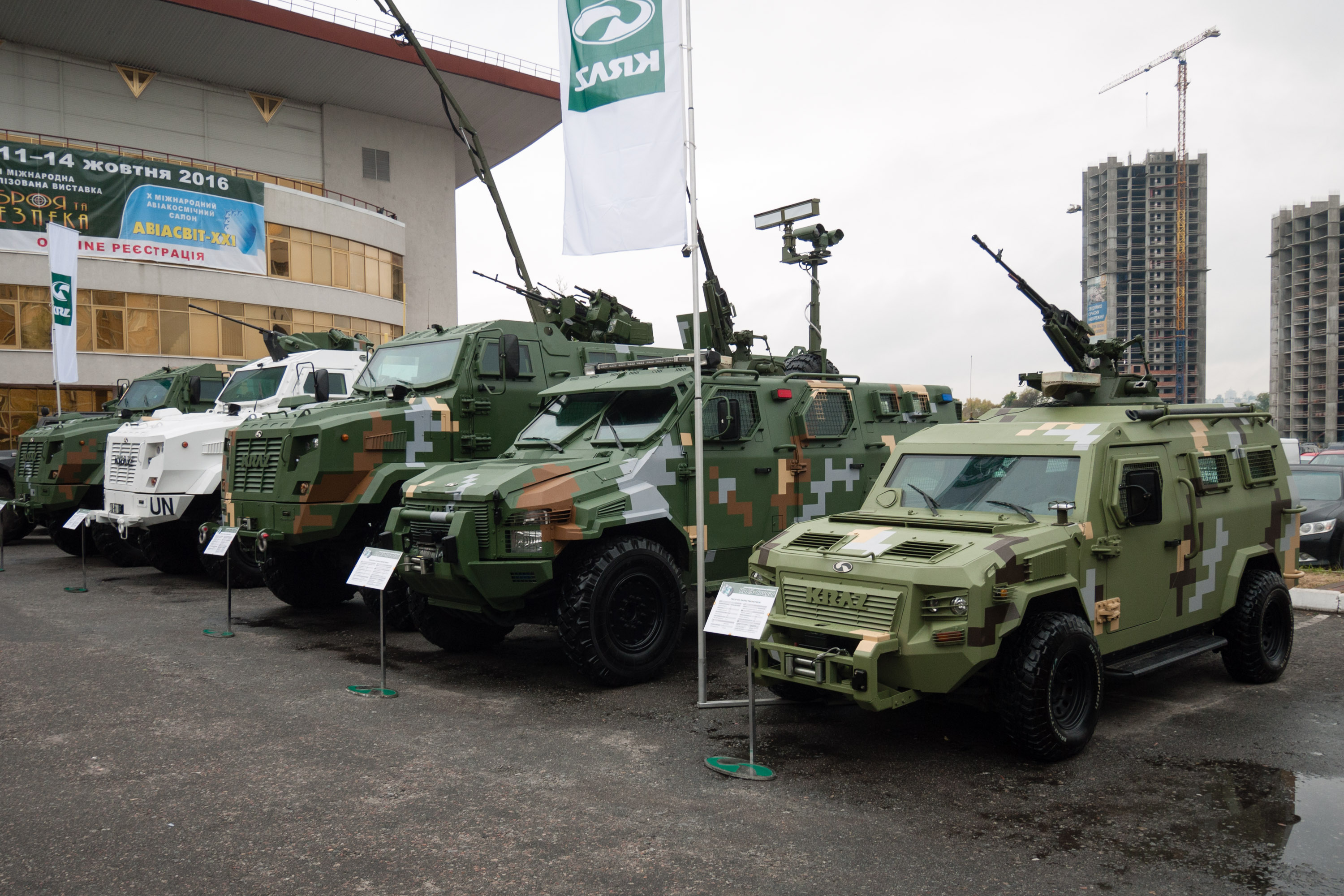
KrAZ armored vehicles in 2016.

- KrAZ Spartan (Спартан) – 4×4, based on Ford F550
- KrAZ Cougar (Кугар) – 4×4, based on Toyota Land Cruiser 79
- KrAZ-ASV Panther (Пантер) – MRAP based on KrAZ-5233 or KrAZ-6322
- KrAZ-MPV Shrek One (Шрек) – MRAP based on KrAZ-5233
- KrAZ Fiona (Фіона) – 6×6 MRAP based on KrAZ-6322
- KrAZ-6322 Raptor (Раптор) – 6×6
- KrAZ Hurricane (Ураган) – 8×8 MRAP based on KrAZ H27.3 (KrAZ-7634)
- KrAZ Convoy (Конвой) – 4×4/6×6/8×8 armored chassis cab/flatbed

== Generations ==
No	years of release	Features	Photo
1	1959—1967		
2	1965—1994		
3	1979—1993		
4	since 1992		
5	since 2011		

== Gallery ==
Trucks

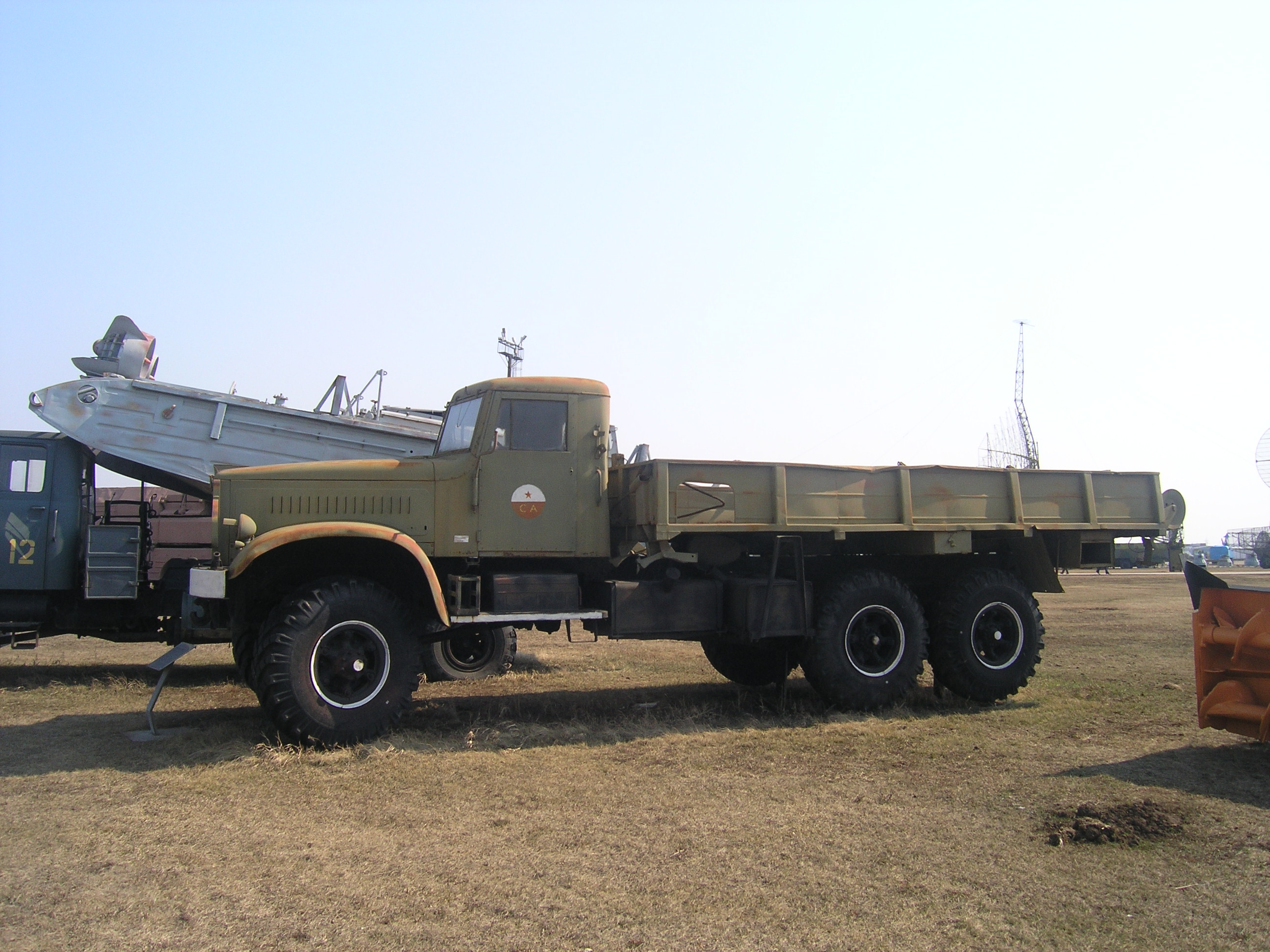
KrAZ-214

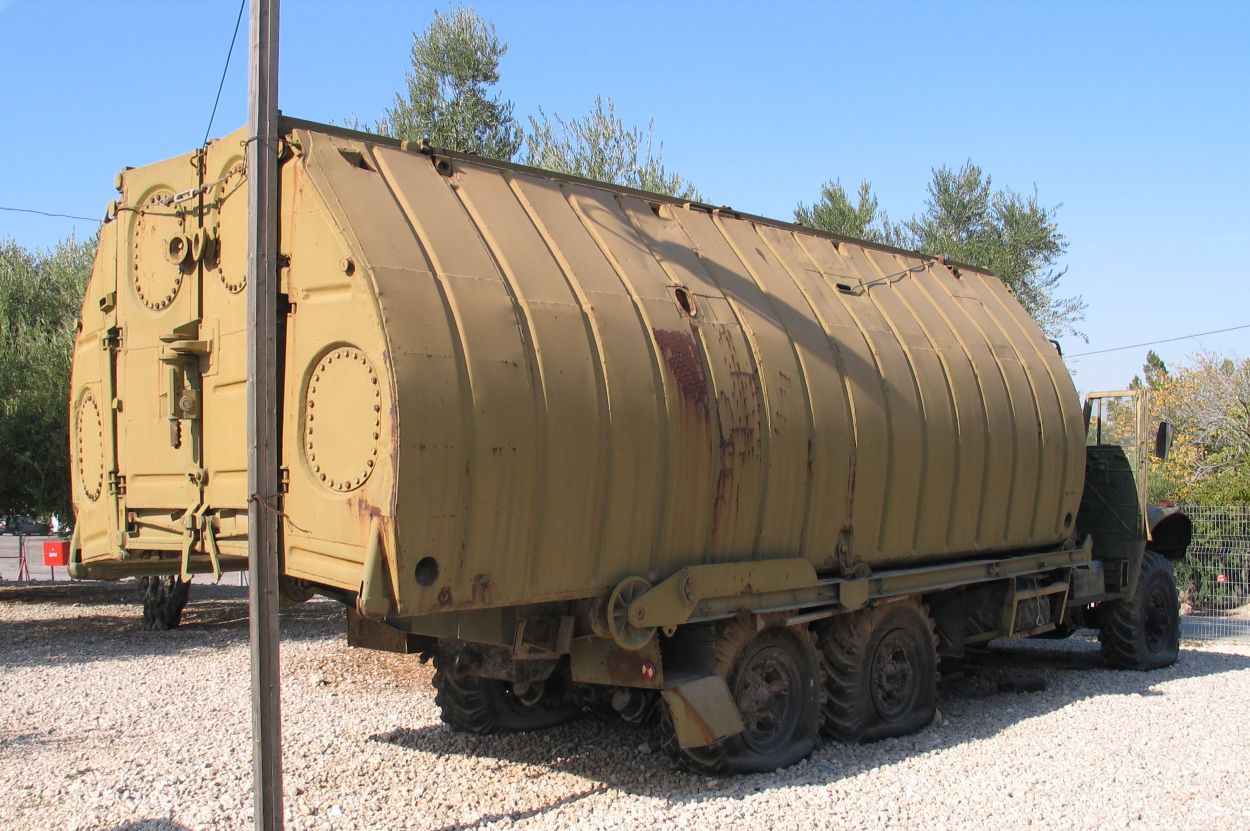
KrAZ-214 with a PMP Pontoon bridge

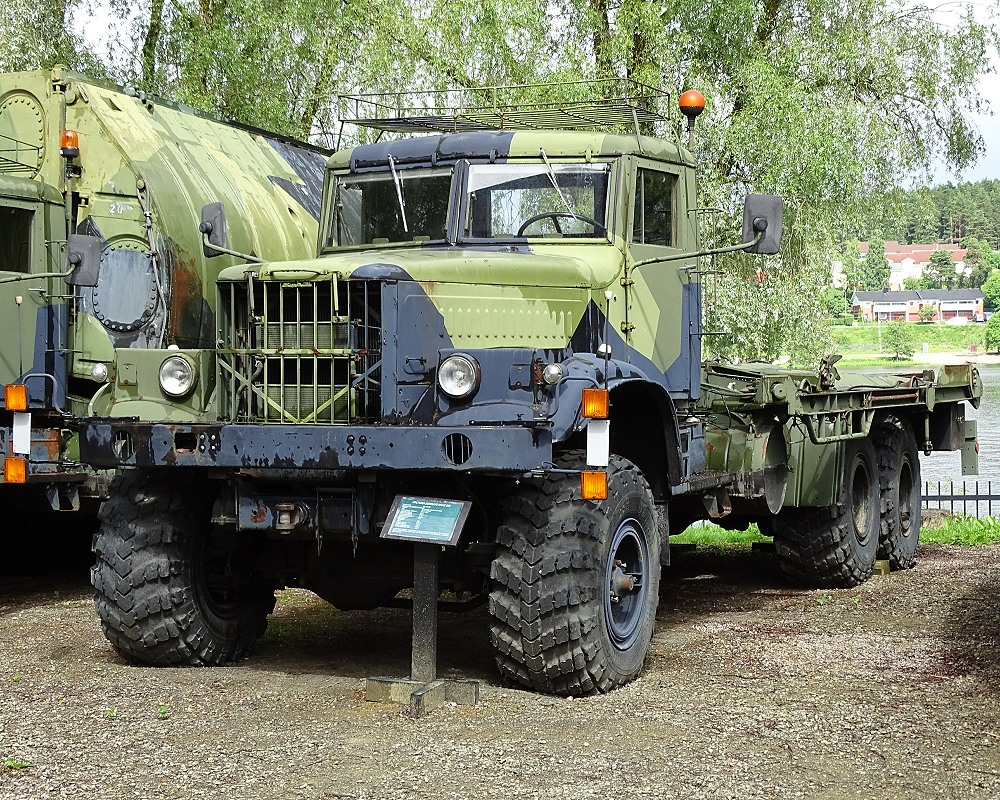
KrAZ-255 with a TMM folding bridge

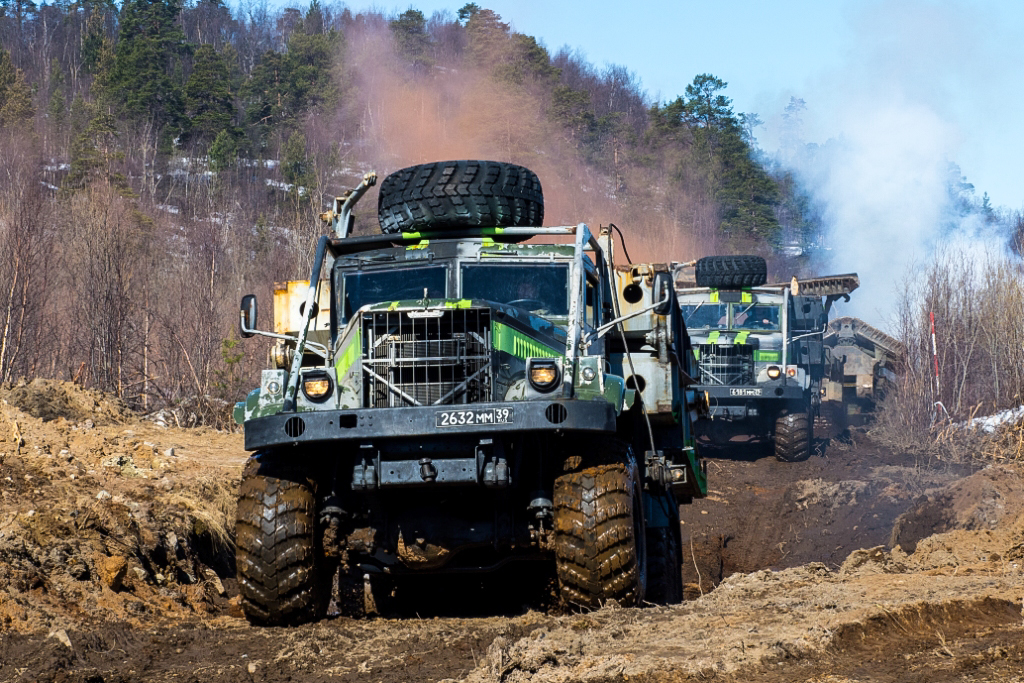
KrAZ-255 with a TMM folding bridge

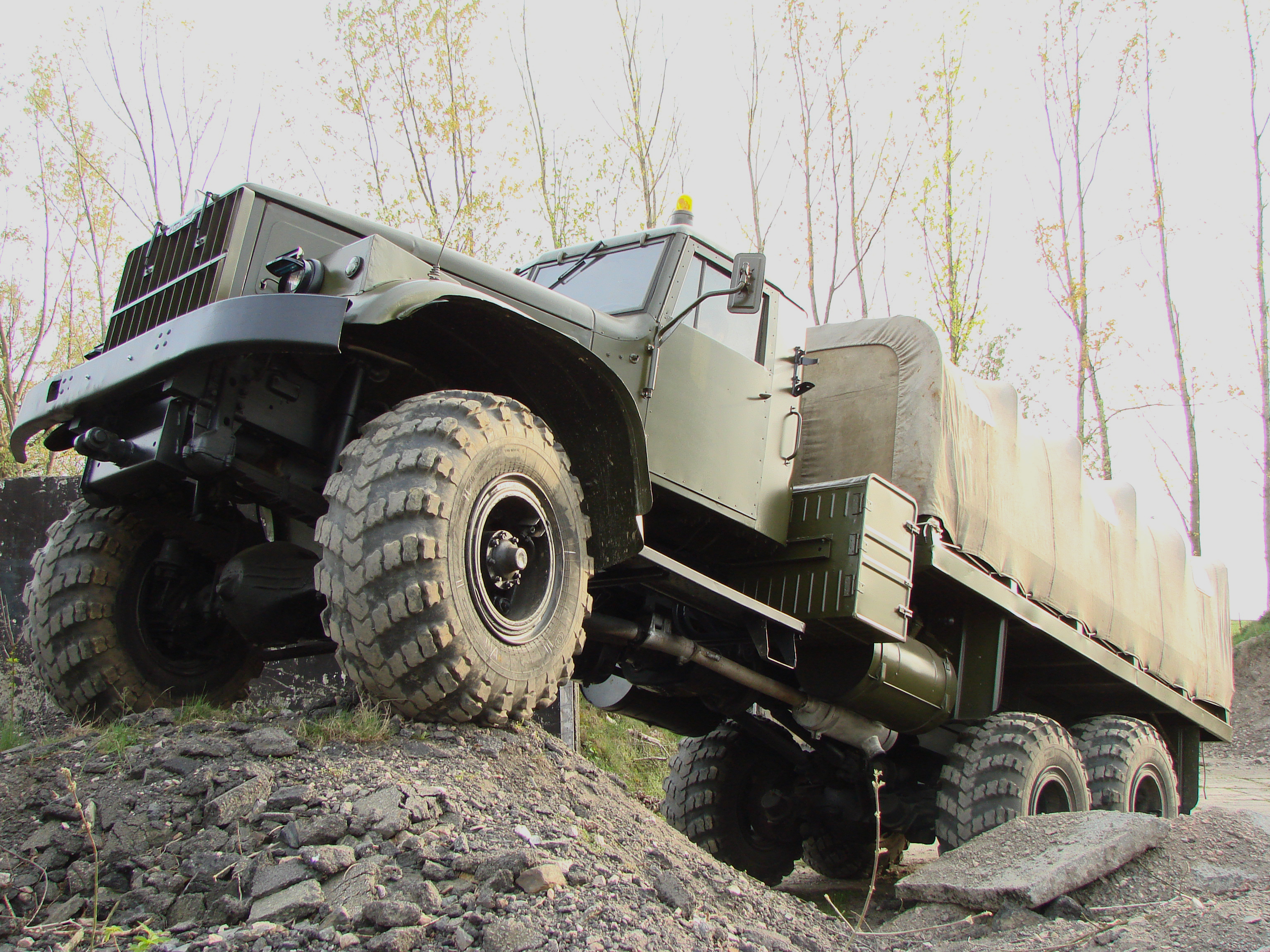
KrAZ-255B showing its undercarriage

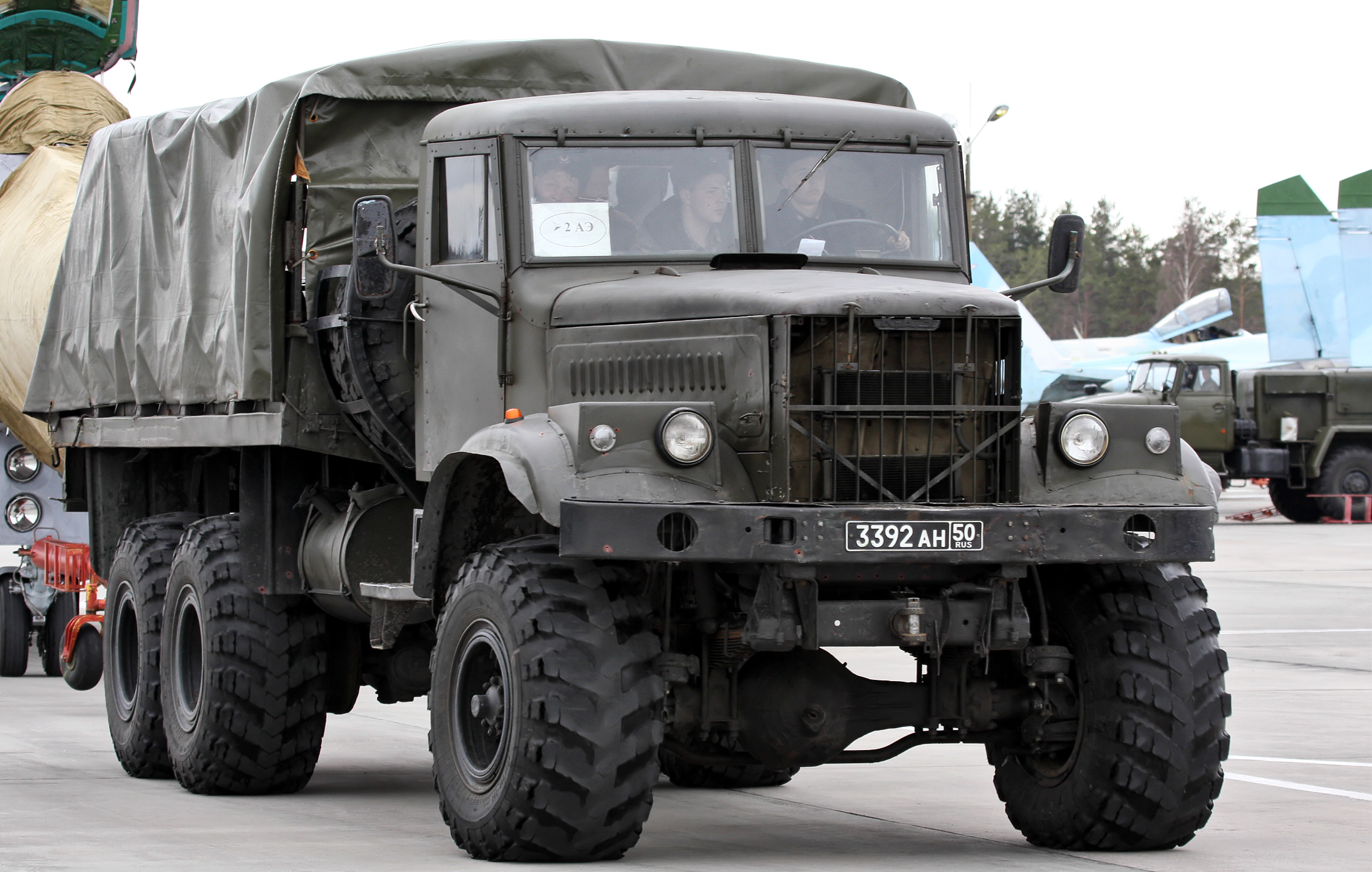
KrAZ-255B

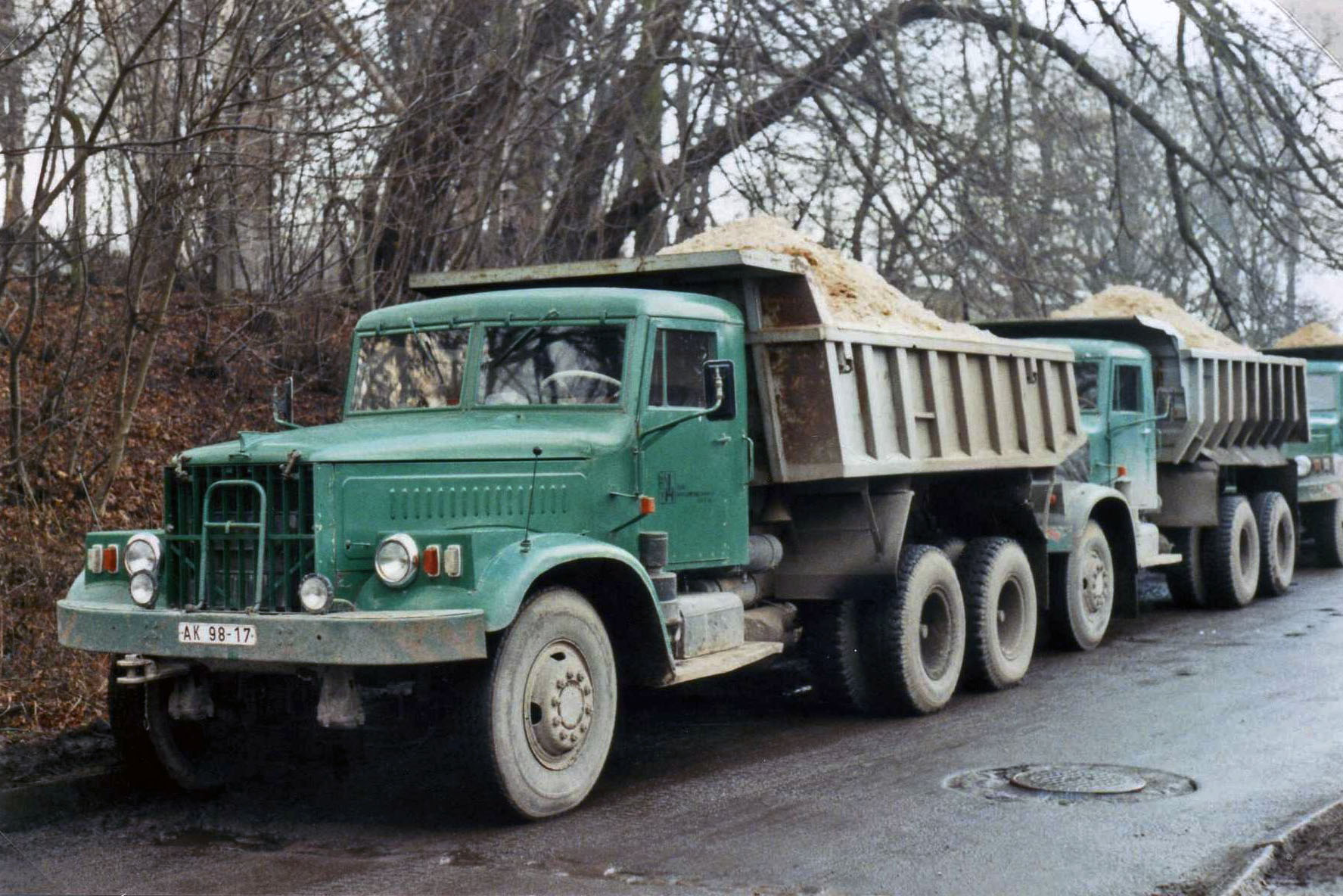
KrAZ-256

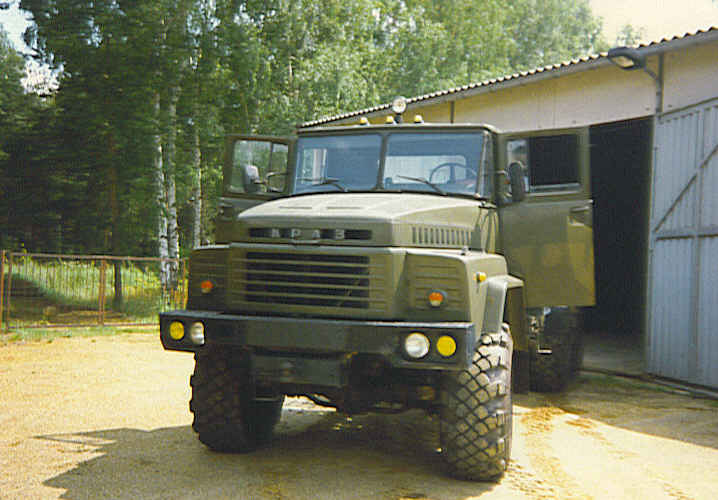
The follow-on to the KrAZ-255, the KrAZ-260. This is a former NVA of DDR.

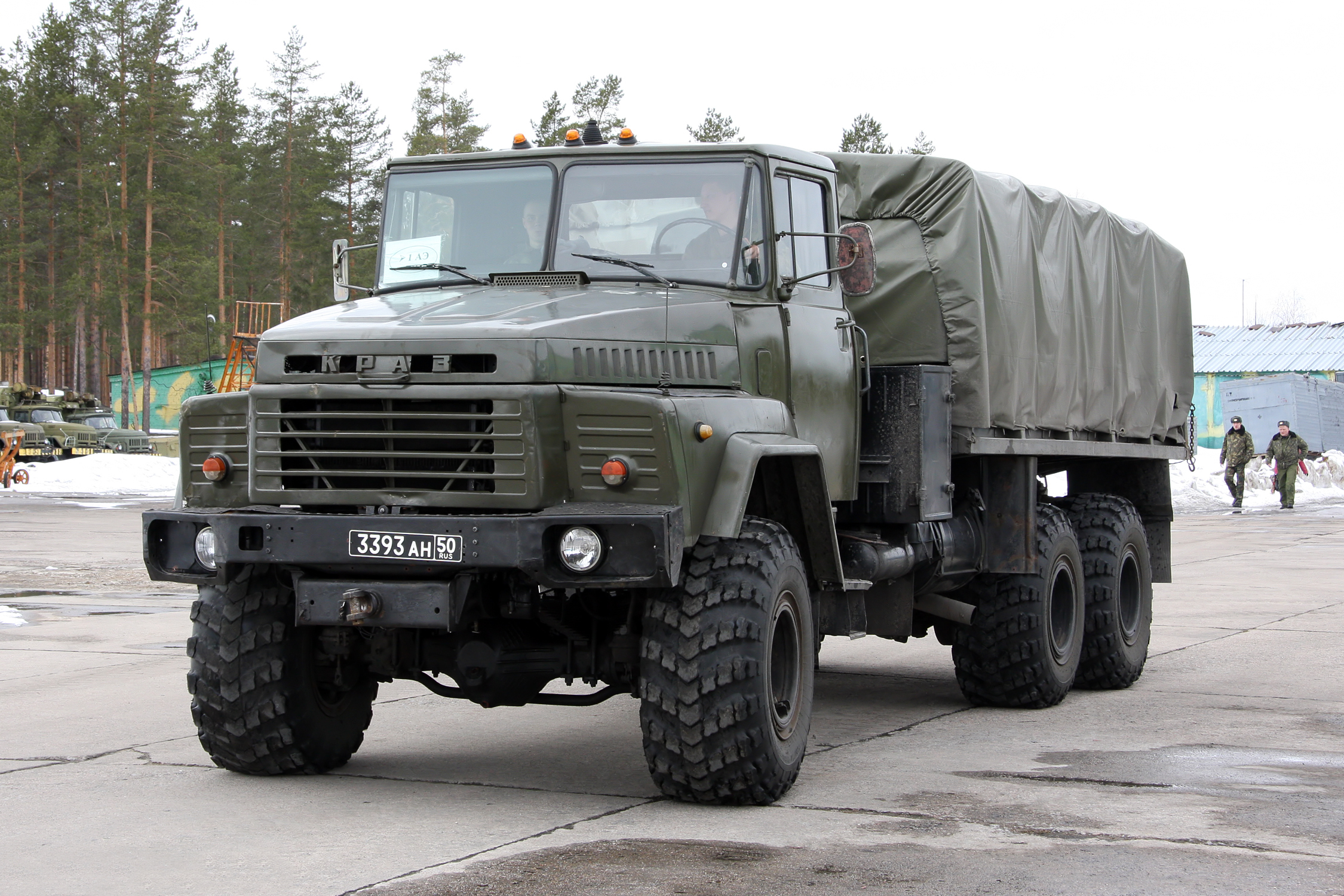
KrAZ-260

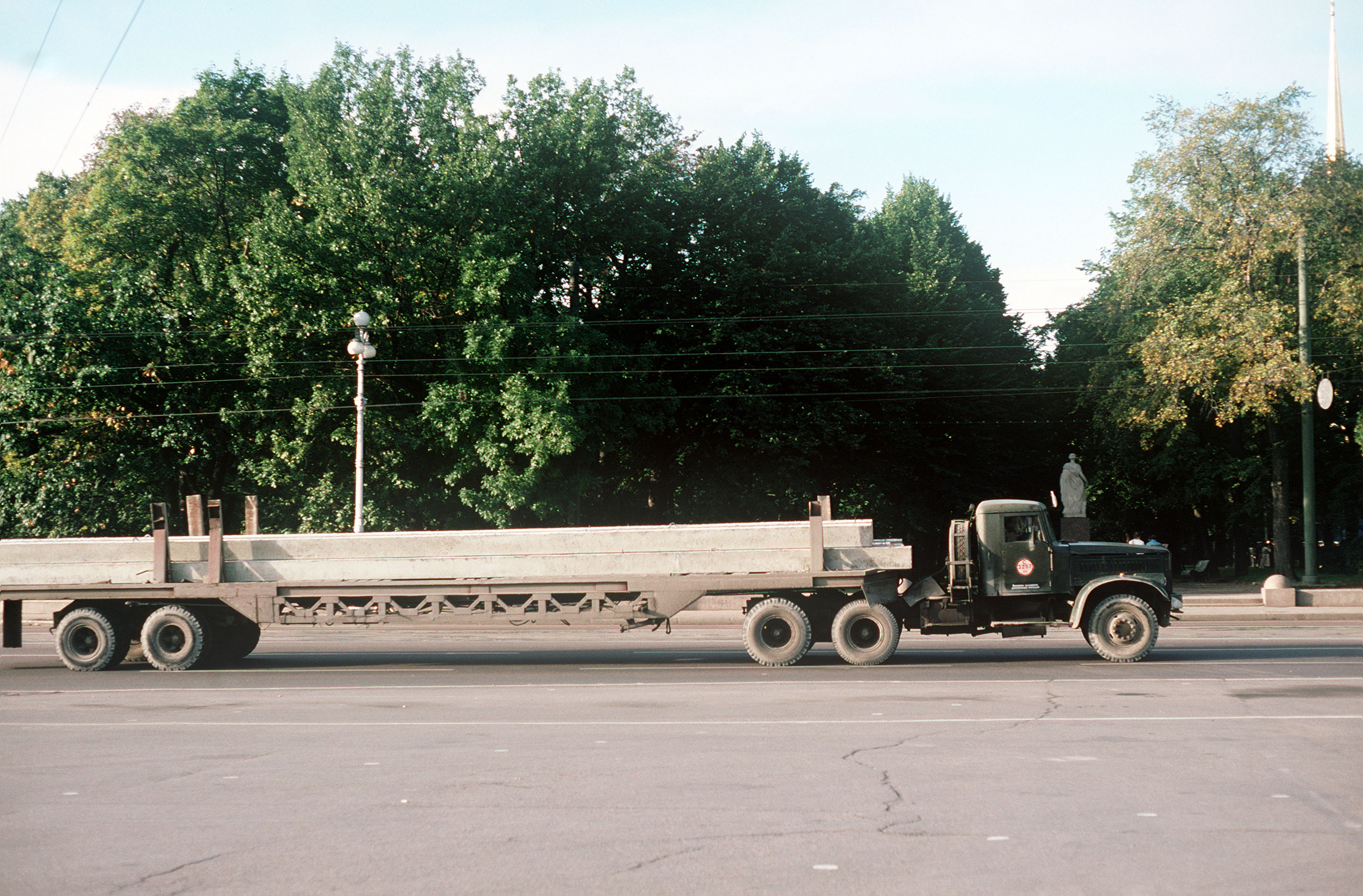
KrAZ-258-semi-trailer truck

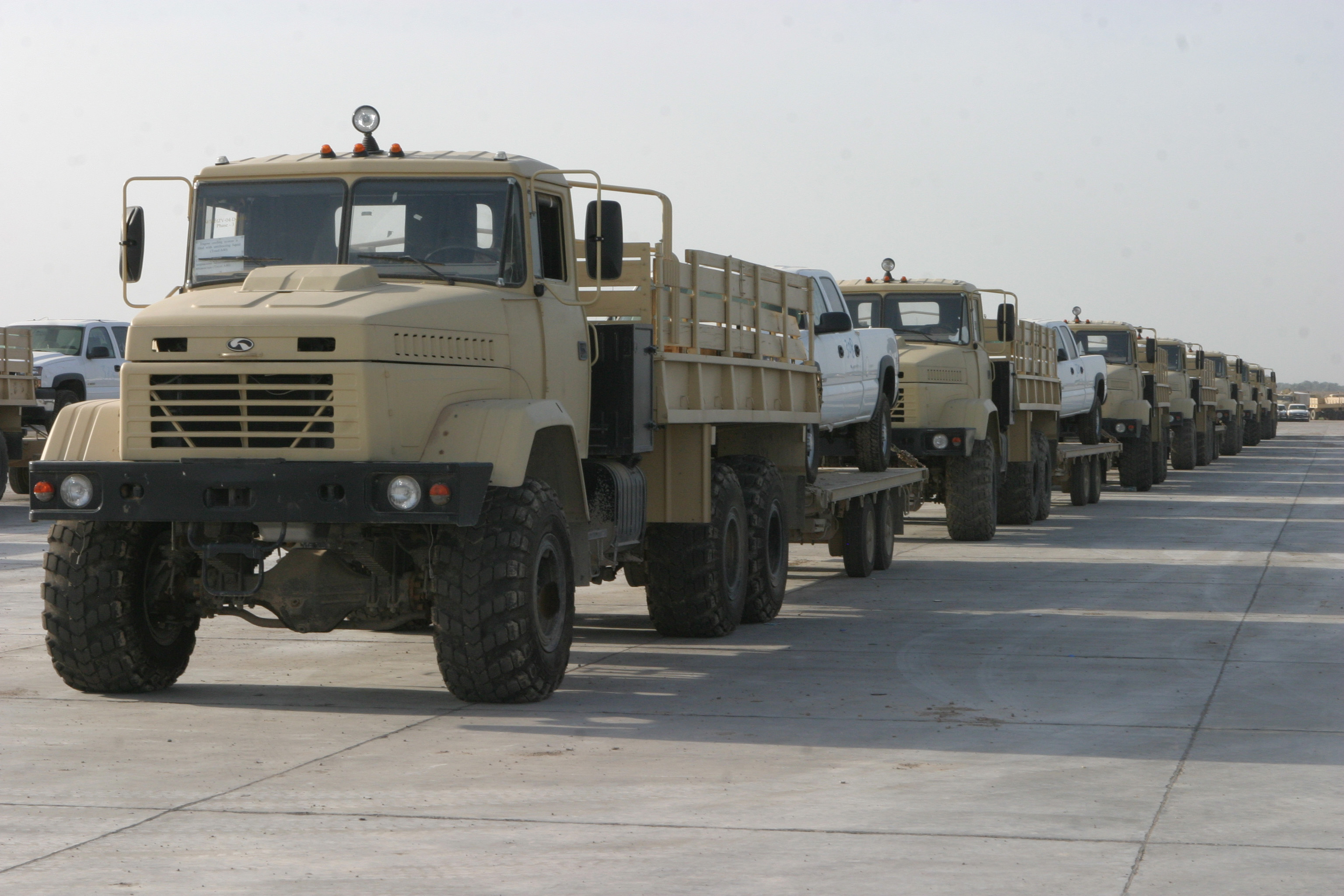
Iraqi Army KrAZ-6322 trucks

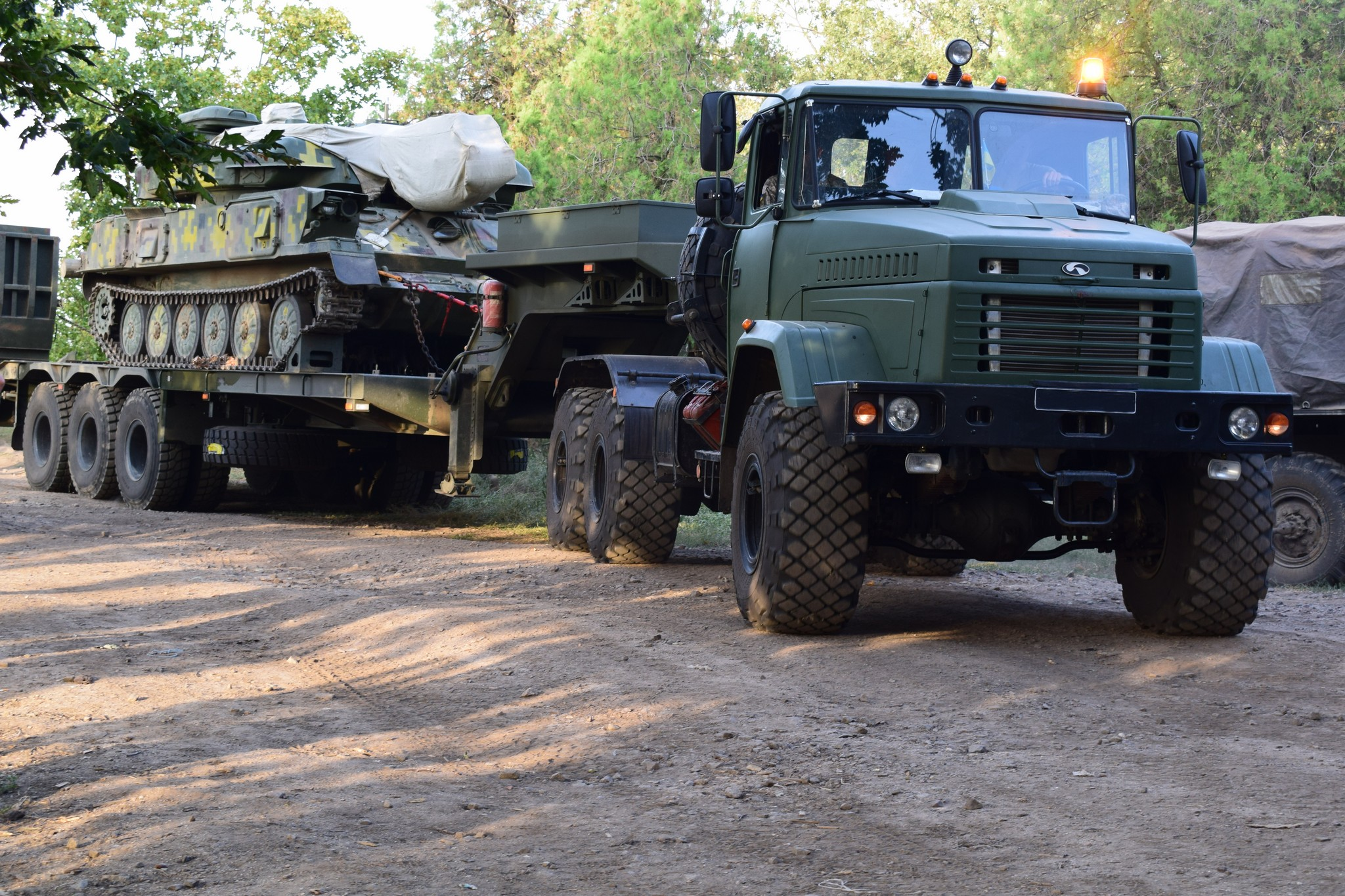
KrAZ-6446 in Ukrainian military service

Armored vehicles

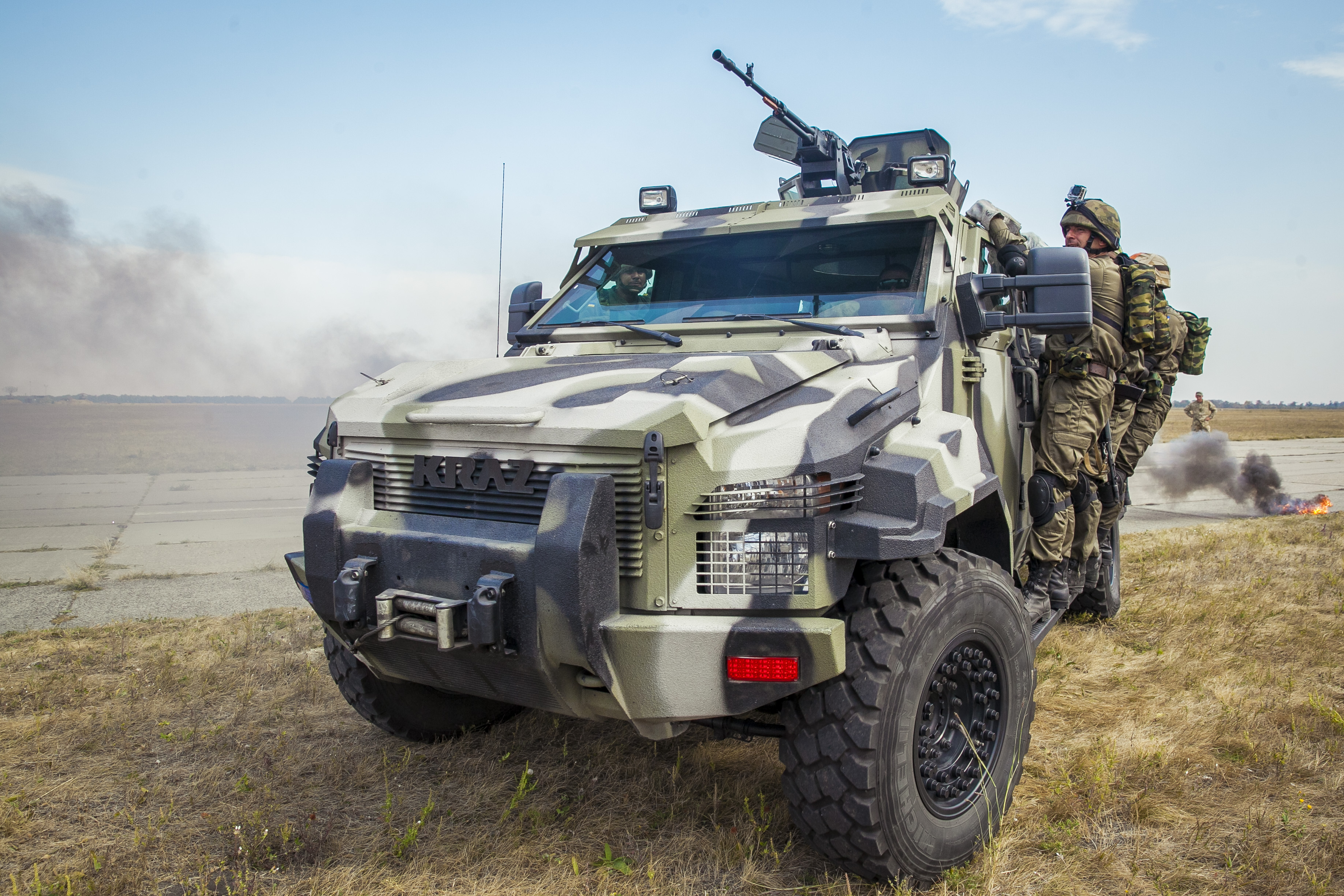
KrAZ Spartan

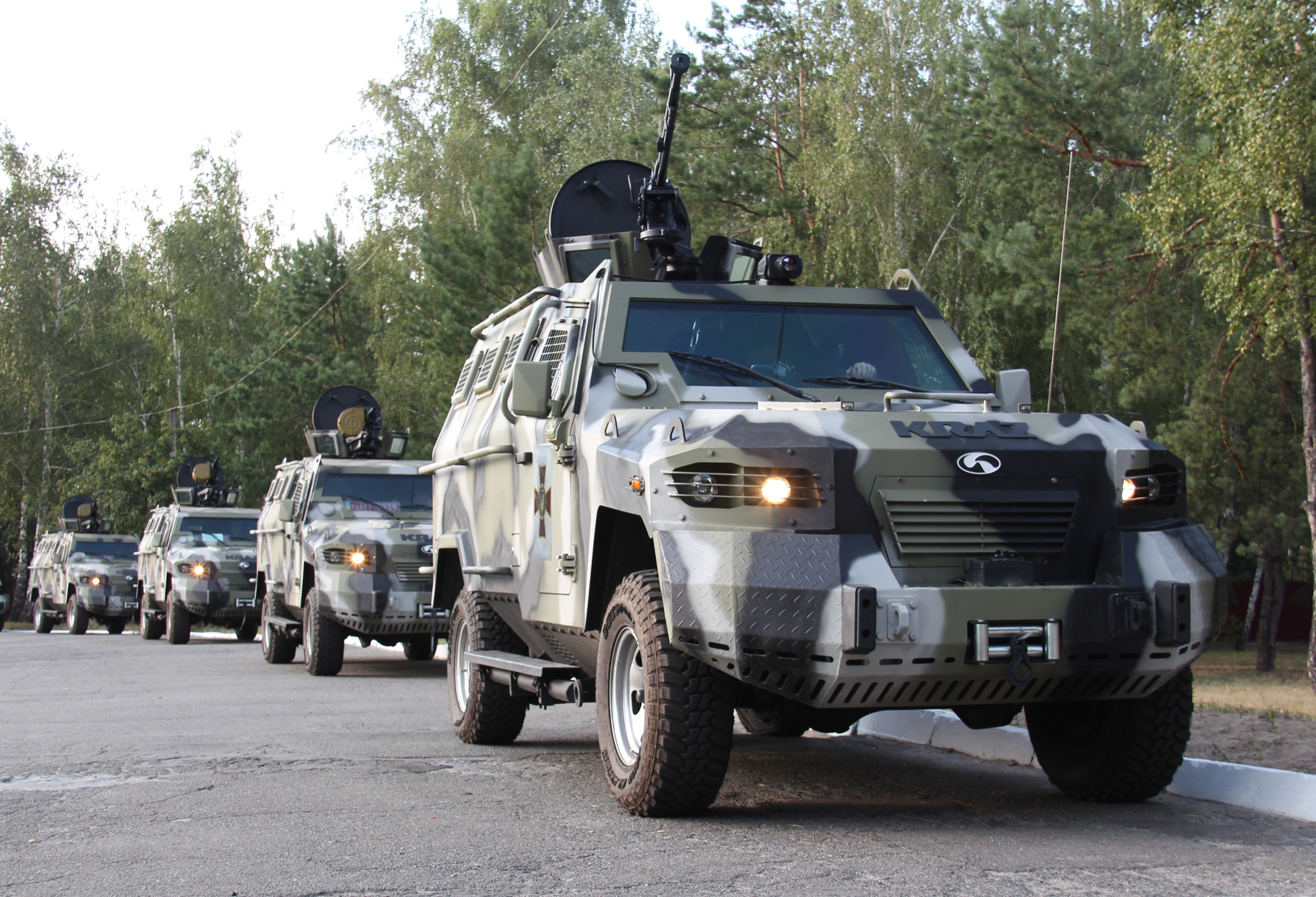
KrAZ Cougar

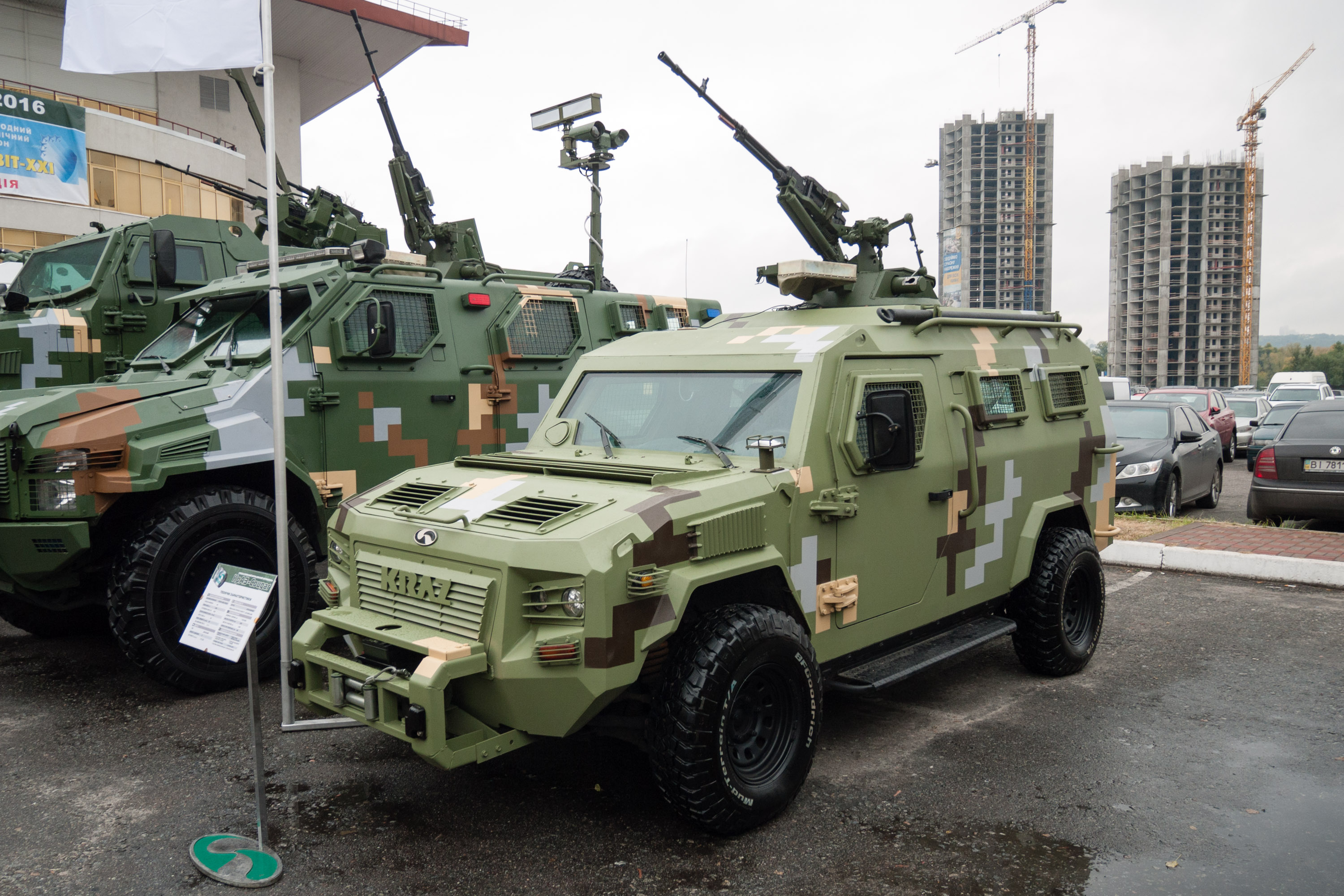
KrAZ Cobra

MRAPS

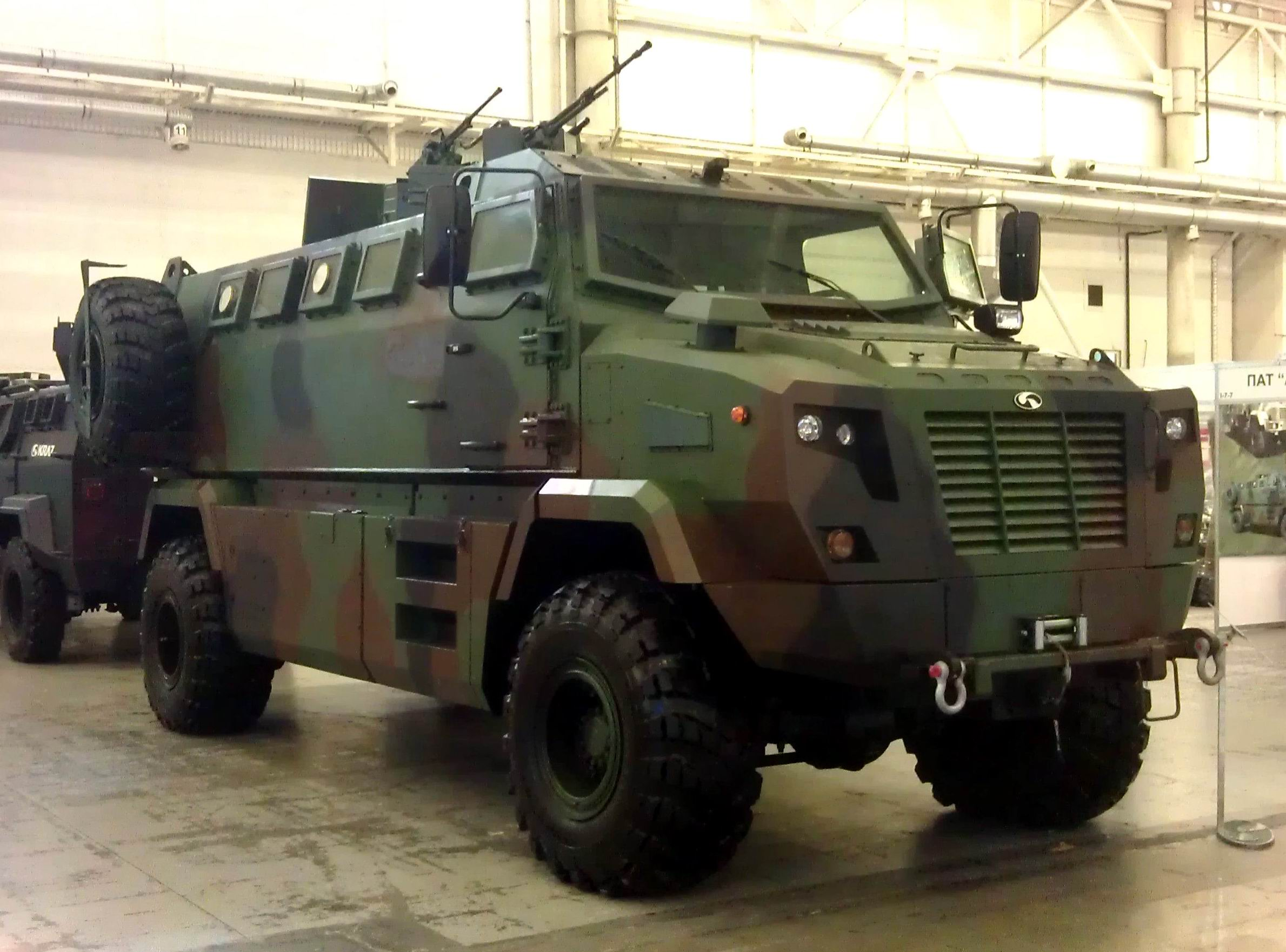
KrAZ Shrek One

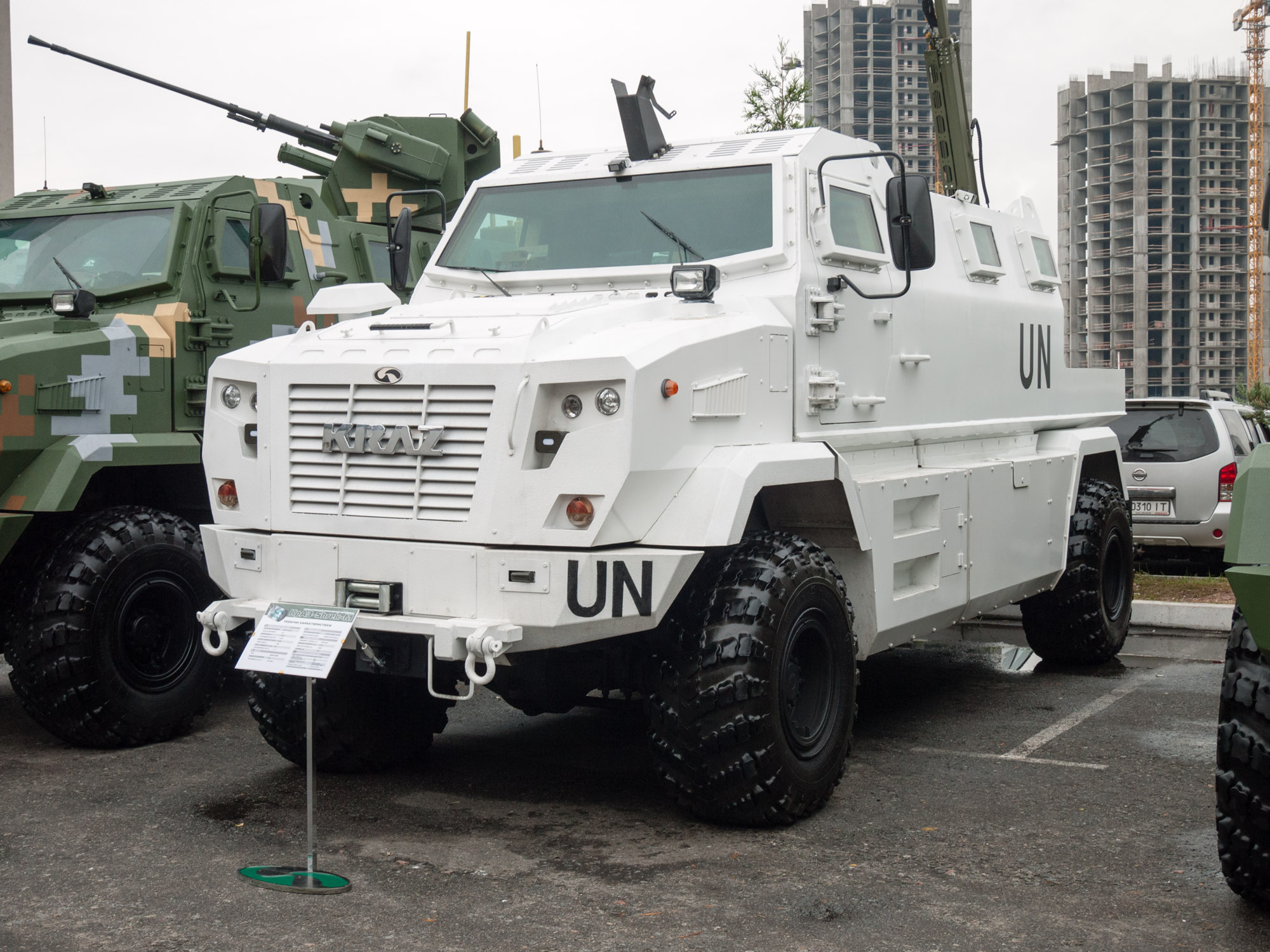
KrAZ Shrek-M

== See also ==
- Kremenchuk Steel Works
