= List of trucks =

This is an incomplete list of trucks currently in production and discontinued trucks (as of 2014). This list does not include pickup trucks, nor trucks used only in militaries. Some images provided below may show the outdated model.

== Currently in production ==
Manufacturer	Model	Image	Class	Cabin	Also called	Country of origin	Regions sold
American LaFrance	American Lafrance Condor		Medium	COE	–	United States	United States, Canada, Mexico
Agrale	Agrale 6500		Light	COE	–	Brazil	South America, Cuba
Agrale	Agrale 8700		Light	COE	Agrale 8700 TR	Brazil	South America, Cuba
Agrale	Agrale 10000		Light	COE	–	Brazil	South America, Cape Verde
Agrale	Agrale 14000		Light/Medium	COE	Agrale 14000 6x2	Brazil	South America, Cape Verde
AMW	AMW TP Series		Heavy	COE	–	India	India
Ashok Leyland	Ashok Layland Avia		Light	COE	–	India	South Asia, Middle East, East Africa
Ashok Leyland	Ashok Leyland eComet		Medium	COE	–	India	South Asia, Middle East, East Africa
Ashok Leyland	Ashok Leyland U-Truck		Heavy	COE	–	India	South Asia, Middle East, East Africa
Askam	Askam AS 950		Medium	Conventional	–	Turkey	Turkey
Askam	Askam 8 Litre		Heavy	COE	–	Turkey	Turkey, Romania, Bulgaria
Askam	Askam Hi-Ex		Heavy	COE	–	Turkey	Turkey, Romania, Bulgaria
Astra	Astra HD9		Heavy	COE	–	Italy	Europe (except Germany, Sweden, Serbia); Africa; South America, Cuba, Mexico; Asia (except India, Japan, South Korea); Ozeania
AMW	AMW TR Series		Heavy	COE	–	India	India
AMW	AMW HL Series		Heavy	COE	–	India	India
AMW	AMW TM Series		Heavy	COE	–	India	India
AMW	AMW CP Series		Heavy	COE	–	India	India
Autocar	Autocar Xspotter		Light	COE	–	United States	United States, Canada, Mexico
Autocar	Autocar Expert		Medium	COE	–	United States	United States, Canada, Mexico
Autocar	Autocar Refuse		Heavy	COE	–	United States	United States, Canada, Mexico
Avia Trucks	Avia D-Line		Light	COE	–	Czech Republic	Czech Republic, Germany, Russia
AzUniversal Motors	Isuzu		Light	COE	–	Azerbaijan	Azerbaijan
BeiBen	BeiBen V3 Series		Heavy	COE	–	China	China, South Africa, Eastern Africa, Southeastern Asia
BeiBen	BeiBen NG80 Series		Heavy	COE	–	China	China, South Africa, Eastern Africa, Southeastern Asia
BeiBen	BeiBen Eurysome		Heavy	COE	–	China	China
BeiBen	BeiBen Tiema Series		Heavy	COE	–	China	China
Beijing Automobile Works	BAW Dragon Flag		Light	COE	–	China	China
Beijing Automobile Works	BAW Bell		Light	COE	–	China	China
BharatBenz	BharatBenz 914		Light	COE	–	India/Germany	India
BharatBenz	BharatBenz 1214		Medium	COE	–	India/Germany	India
BharatBenz	BharatBenz 2523		Heavy	COE	–	India/Germany	India
BharatBenz	BharatBenz 3128		Heavy	COE	–	India/Germany	India
BharatBenz	BharatBenz 3143		Heavy	COE	–	India/Germany	India
BharatBenz	BharatBenz 3723		Heavy	COE	–	India	India
Bryansk Automobile Plant	BAZ-69096		Military Heavy	Cabin before engine		Russia	Russia
Bryansk Automobile Plant	BAZ-69096 (civilian version)		Heavy	Cabin before engine		Russia	Russia
Bryansk Automobile Plant	BAZ-64022		Military Heavy	Cabin before engine		Russia	Russia
BMC (Turkey)	BMC Fatih		Heavy	COE	–	Turkey	Turkey
BMC	BMC Profesyonel		Light/Medium/Heavy	COE	–	Turkey	Turkey
Caterpillar	Cat CT660		Heavy	Conventional	–	United States	United States, Canada, Australia
CAMC	CAMC 6 x 4		Heavy	COE	-	China	China
CAMC	H08		Heavy	-	-	China	-
CEV	Might-E Truck		Light	COE	–	Canada	Canada, United States
Chevrolet	Chevrolet NHR		Light	COE	Isuzu Grafter(United Kingdom), Isuzu Lingqingka (China), Isuzu Reward, Chevrolet N-Series, HICOM Perkasa	Japan	Columbia
Chevrolet	Chevrolet NKR		Light	COE	Isuzu Grafter(United Kingdom), Isuzu Lingqingka (China), Isuzu Reward, Chevrolet N-Series, HICOM Perkasa	Japan	Columbia
Chevrolet	Chevrolet N-Series		Light	COE	Isuzu Grafter(United Kingdom), Isuzu Lingqingka (China), Isuzu Reward, Chevrolet NHR, Chevrolet NKR, HICOM Perkasa	Japan	Egypt
Chevrolet	Chevrolet Express Cutaway		Light	Conventional	GMC Savana	United States	United States, Canada, Mexico, Middle East
Chevrolet	Chevrolet FTR		Medium	COE	–	Japan	Columbia
Chevrolet	Chevrolet FVR		Heavy	COE	–	Japan	Columbia
Chevrolet	Chevrolet FVZ		Heavy	COE	–	Japan	Columbia
Chevrolet	Chevrolet CYZ		Heavy	COE	–	Japan	Columbia
Citroën	Citroën Jumper		Light	Conventional	Fiat Ducato, Peugeot Boxer	Italy	Europe, Middle East, Algeria, South Africa, Morocco, Western Africa
CCC	CCC LET2		Medium	COE	CCC LET2 CC	United States	United States, Canada
CCC	CCC COE2		Medium	COE	–	United States	United States, Canada
CCC	CCC LOT2		Medium	COE	–	United States	United States, Canada
CNJ	CNJ Fortune		Light	COE	–	China	China
CNJ	CNJ Ruichi		Light	COE	–	China	China
DAF Trucks	DAF LF		Light	COE	–	The Netherlands	worldwide, except North America and Japan
DAF Trucks	DAF CF		Heavy	COE	–	The Netherlands	Worldwide, except North America and Japan
DAF Trucks	DAF XF		Heavy	COE	–	The Netherlands	Worldwide, except North America and Japan
Dayun	Dayun CGC1047PB33E3		Light	COE	Dayun CGC1048PX28E3	China	China, South East Asia, Middle East, Russia, France, Africa, Cuba, Venezuela, Brazil
Dayun	Dayun CGC1141		Heavy	COE	–	China	China, South East Asia, Middle East, Russia, France, Africa, Cuba, Venezuela, Brazil
Dayun	Dayun DYX1250		Heavy	COE	–	China	China
Dayun	Dayun CGC1311		Heavy	COE	–	China	China
Dayun	Dayun DYX5310		Heavy	COE	-	China	China, South East Asia, Middle East, Russia, France, Africa, Cuba, Venezuela, Brazil
Dina	Dina Hustler		Light	COE	–	Mexico	Mexico, Nicaragua, United States, Canada
Dongfeng	Dongfeng Palawan		Light	COE	Nissan Cabstar(Europe, Australia, China), Nissan Atlas H41 Series(Malaysia), UD Kuzer UE Series(Malaysia), Nissan Atlas, Renault Maxity, Renault Samsung SV110, UD Condor, Yue Loong Homer, Isuzu N-Series	Japan	China
Dongfeng	Dongfeng Gold Fighter		Light	COE	–	China	China
Dongfeng	Dongfeng Chenglong		Light	COE	–	China	China
Dongfeng	Dongfeng Kang PA		Light	COE	–	China	China
Dongfeng	Dongfeng Star		Light	COE	–	China	China
Dongfeng	Dongfeng Badly		Light	COE	–	China	China
Dongfeng	Dongfeng Days Kam		Medium	COE	–	China	China
Dongfeng	Dongfeng Likas		Medium	COE	–	China	China
Dongfeng	Dongfeng King Kong		Medium	COE	–	China	China
Dongfeng	Dongfeng Tianlong		Heavy	COE	–	China	China
Dongfeng	Dongfeng Titan		Heavy	COE	–	China	China
Dongfeng	Dongfeng Balong Heavy Truck		Heavy	COE	–	China	China
Dongfeng	Dongfeng Dragon Card		Heavy	Conventional	–	China	China
FAP	FAP 1318		Light	COE	–	Serbia	Serbia
FAP	FAP 1824		Light	COE	–	Serbia	Serbia
FAP	FAP 1828		Light	COE	FAP 1829	Serbia	Serbia
FAP	FAP 1830		Heavy	COE	–	Serbia	Serbia
FAP	FAP 2235		Light	COE	FAP 2236	Serbia	Serbia
FAP	FAP 2640		Heavy	COE	–	Serbia	Serbia
FAW	FAW CA1051K26L3		Light	COE	FAW CA1051K26L4	China	China
FAW	FAW CA1051K26L3R5		Light	COE	FAW CA1051K26L4R5; FAW CA1061K28L5R5; FAW CA1061K28L6R5	China	China
FAW	FAW CA1037K2L		Light	COE	FAW CA1037K2L2; FAW CA1047K26L; FAW CA1047K26L2	China	China
FAW	FAW CA1031K2LR5		Light	COE	FAW CA1041K26LR5; FAW CA1041K26L2R5	China	China
FAW	FAW CA1031K2L		Light	COE	FAW CA1031K2L2; FAW CA1041K26L; FAW CA1041K26L2COE	China	China
FAW	FAW CA5313CLXYP7K2L11T4		Medium	COE	FAW CA1258P1K2L7T1; FAW CA5167XXYP11K2L7; FAW CA1126P1K2L2; FAW CA1121J; FAW CA1083P9K2L2	China	China
FAW	FAW CA3075K2		Medium	Conventional	FAW CA1093K2; FAW CA1097K2	China	China
FAW	FAW CA4322P21K15T1YA82		Medium	COE	FAW CA3320P2K1T1YA80; FAW CA1121PK2L2Y; FAW CA1070K28L3Y	China	China
FAW	FAW CA3313P7K2T4A		Heavy	COE	FAW CA3250P1K2T1; FAW CA3252P2K2T1A1; FAW CA3312P2K2T4A1	China	China
FAW	FAW CA4252P21K2T1A		Heavy	COE	FAW CA4182P21K2; FAW CA4163P7K2; FAW CA4180P66K2E; FAW CA4250P66K22T1A2E; FAW CA4260P66K22T1A	China	China, Russia
FAW	Jiefang J6		Heavy	COE	–	China	China, Iran, Russia
FAW	Jiefang J7		Heavy	COE	–	China	-
FAW-GM	Jie Fang 1-Ton Truck		Light	COE	–	China/United States	China
FAW-GM	Jie Fang 2-Ton Truck		Medium	COE	–	China/United States	China
FAW-GM	Jie Fang 3-Ton Truck		Heavy	COE	–	China/United States	China
Fiat	Fiat Ducato		Light	Conventional	Peugeot Boxer, Citroën Jumper	Italy	Europe, South Africa
FNM	Agrale		Light	Electric	FNM 832 E 13 t & FNM 833 E 18 t	Brazil	Brazil
Ford	Ford F-650/750		Medium	Conventional	–	United States	United States, Canada, Mexico
Ford	Ford Econoline Cutaway		Light	Conventional	–	United States	United States, Canada, Mexico
Ford	Ford Transit Cutaway		Light	Conventional	–	United States	United States, Canada, Mexico
Ford	Ford Cargo		Light/Medium/Heavy	COE	–	Brazil and Turkey(formally United States)	Europe, Brazil
Ford Otosan	Ford F-MAX		Heavy	COE	–	Turkey	Europe
Foton	Foton Aumark Series		Light	COE	Master Foton	China	China, Algeria, South East Asia, Russia, Columbia, Peru, South Africa, Middle East
Foton	Foton Ollin Series		Light	COE	–	China	China, Algeria, South East Asia, Russia, Columbia, Peru, South Africa, Middle East
Foton	Foton Auman Series		Heavy	COE	–	China	China, Algeria, South East Asia, Russia, Columbia, Peru, South Africa, Middle East
Freightliner	Freigtliner M2 106		Medium	Conventional	–	United States	North America
Freightliner	Freightliner M2 112		Medium	Conventional	Freightliner Columbia (South Africa, Australia, New Zealand)	United States	North America, South Africa, Australia, New Zealand
Freightliner	Freightliner Coronado Series		Heavy	Conventional	–	United States	North America, Australia, New Zealand
Freightliner	Freightliner Cascadia		Heavy	Conventional	–	United States	North America
Freightliner	Freightliner 108SD		Heavy	Conventional	–	United States	North America
Freightliner	Freightliner 114SD		Heavy	Conventional	–	United States	North America
Freightliner	Freightliner Century Class		Heavy	Conventional	–	Australia(formally United States)	Australia
Freightliner	Freightliner Argosy		Heavy	COE	–	Australia/South Africa(Formally United States)	Australia, New Zealand, South Africa
GA	MAZ		Medium	COE	–	Azerbaijan	Azerbaijan
GAZ	GAZ-3307 and GAZ-3309		Medium	Conventional	–	Russia	Russia, Eastern Europe
GAZ	GAZ-3308 Sadko		Medium	Conventional	–	Russia	Russia, Eastern Europe
GAZ	GAZ Gazelle		Light	Conventional	GAZelle Business	Russia	Russia, Eastern Europe, Turkey
GAZ	GAZelle NEXT		Light	Conventional	–	Russia	Russia, Eastern Europe
GAZ	GAZon NEXT		Medium	Conventional	–	Russia	Russia, Eastern Europe
GAZ	GAZ Sadko NEXT		Medium	Conventional	–	Russia	Worldwide, except EU, North America
GAZ	GAZ Valdai		Medium	Conventional	–	Russia	Russia, Eastern Europe
GINAF	GINAF C-Series		Medium	COE	–	The Netherlands	Western Europe
GINAF	GINAF X-Series		Heavy	COE	–	The Netherlands	Western Europe
Hino	Hino 300 Series		Light	COE	Hino 195(United States, Canada, and Mexico)	Japan	Asia Pacific, United States, Canada, Mexico, South America, Russia
Hino	Hino 238		Medium	Conventional	Hino 258, Hino 338	United States/Canada	United States, Canada, Mexico
Hino	Hino 500 Series		Medium	COE	–	Japan	Asia Pacific, Canada, United States, South America, Russia
Hino	Hino 700 Series		Heavy	COE	–	Japan	Asia Pacific, South America, Russia
Hyundai	Hyundai HD45		Light	COE	–	South Korea	South Korea
Hyundai	Hyundai HD65/72/78		Light	COE	–	South Korea	South Korea, Russia
Hyundai	Hyundai H350		Light	Conventional	–	South Korea	Europe
Hyundai	Hyundai Mighty		Light	COE	–	South Korea	Asia Pacific, Middle East, Russia
Hyundai	Hyundai HD120/210		Medium	COE	–	South Korea	South Korea, Russia
Hyundai	Hyundai Cargo Truck		Heavy	COE	–	South Korea	South Korea, Russia
Hyundai	Hyundai Xcient		Heavy	COE	–	South Korea	Asia Pacific, Middle East, Russia
Iran Khodro Diesel	Khawar 1934		Heavy	Conventional	Khawar 2694	(Originally)Germany (Currently)Iran	Iran
Isuzu	Isuzu N-Series		Light	COE	Nissan Cabstar(Europe, Australia, China), Nissan Atlas H41 Series(Malaysia), UD Kuzer UE Series(Malaysia), Nissan Atlas, Renault Maxity, Renault Samsung SV110, UD Condor, Yue Loong Homer, Dong Feng Pahlawan, Isuzu N-Series	Japan	Malaysia
Isuzu	Mazda Titan		Light	COE	Isuzu Elf, Ford Trader	Japan	Japan
Isuzu	Isuzu Elf		Light	COE	Isuzu Grafter(United Kingdom), Isuzu Lingqingka (China), Isuzu Reward, Chevrolet NHR, Chevrolet NKR, Chevrolet N-Series, HICOM Perkasa	Japan	Worldwide
Isuzu	Isuzu Forward		Medium	COE	Isuzu Borneo (Indonesia), Isuzu Heavy Duty, Isuzu F-Series, Chevrolet FTR	Japan	Worldwide
Isuzu	Isuzu Giga		Heavy	COE	Chevrolet FVR, Chevrolet FVZ, Isuzu C/E-Series Mark II	Japan	Asia-Pacific, Mid-East, Africa, South America, Russia
Iveco	Iveco Daily		Light, Medium	Conventional	–	Italy	Europe, Australia, Africa, Middle East, Taiwan, Latin America
Iveco	Iveco PowerStar		Heavy	Conventional	Iveco Strator(Europe)	Australia	Australia, New Zealand, Europe
Iveco	Iveco Eurocargo		Light	COE	–	Germany	Worldwide, except North America
Iveco	Iveco Trakker		Heavy	COE	–	Germany	worldwide, except North America
Iveco	Iveco Stralis		Heavy	COE	–	Malawi	worldwide, except North America
Iveco	Iveco S-Way		Heavy	COE	–	-	-
JAC	JAC 4DA1 Series		Light	COE	–	China	China
JAC	JAC FHC Series		Light	COE	–	China	China
JAC	JAC Shuailing		Medium	COE	–	China	China
JAC	JAC Tipper		Heavy	COE	–	China	China
JAC	JAC Tractor		Heavy	COE	–	China	China
JMC	JMC Carrying		Light	COE	–	China	China
Kalmar Industries	Kalmar 4x2 off Highway		Medium	COE	–	Finland	Europe, North America, Australia, China, India, Japan, Indonesia, South Korea, Middle East, Singapore
Kalmar Industries	Kalmar TR-Series		Medium	COE	–	Finland	Europe, North America, Australia, China, India, Japan, Indonesia, South Korea, Middle East, Singapore
KAMAZ	KAMAZ 43253		Heavy	COE	KAMAZ 43215	Russia	Russia, Eastern Europe, Latin America, China, Middle East, North Africa, Central Asia, Singapore
KAMAZ	KAMAZ 43114		Heavy	COE	KAMAZ 43118	Russia	Russia, Eastern Europe, Latin America, China, Middle East, North Africa, Central Asia, Singapore
KAMAZ	KAMAZ 65207		Heavy	COE	–	Russia	Russia, Eastern Europe, Central Asia
KAMAZ	KAMAZ 65117		Heavy	COE	–	Russia	Russia
KAMAZ	KAMAZ 4326		Medium	COE	–	Russia	Russia
KAMAZ	KAMAZ 4308		Medium	COE	–	Russia	Russia, Eastern Europe, Latin America, China, Middle East, North Africa, Central Asia, Singapore
KAMAZ	KAMAZ 54115		Heavy	COE	–	Russia	Russia, Central Europe, Central Asia
KAMAZ	KAMAZ 5460		Heavy	COE	–	Russia	Russia, Central Europe, Central Asia
KAMAZ	KAMAZ 5490		Heavy	COE	–	Russia	Russia, Central Europe, Central Asia
KAMAZ	KAMAZ 65116		Heavy	COE	–	Russia	Russia, Central Europe, Central Asia
KAMAZ	KAMAZ 65206		Heavy	COE	–	Russia	Russia, Central Europe, Central Asia
KAMAZ	KAMAZ 6460		Heavy	COE	–	Russia	Russia, Central Europe, Central Asia
KAMAZ	KAMAZ 44108		Heavy	COE	–	Russia	Russia, Central Europe, Central Asia
KAMAZ	KAMAZ 65201		Heavy	COE	–	Russia	Russia, Eastern Europe
KAMAZ	KAMAZ 65224		Heavy	COE	–	Russia	Russia
KAMAZ	KAMAZ 65225		Heavy	COE	–	Russia	Russia, Central Europe, Central Asia
KAMAZ	KAMAZ 65226		Heavy	COE	–	Russia	Russia, Central Europe, Central Asia
Kia	Kia Bongo		Light	COE	Kia K-Series(Europe, Australia and South America), Kia Besta, Kia Travello (Indonesia)	South Korea	Asia (except Japan), Europe, Oceania, South America
Kenworth	Kenworth K270		Light	COE	Kenworth K370	United States	United States, Canada, Mexico
Kenworth	Kenworth T170		Medium	Conventional	Kenworth T270/T370/T440/T470	United States	United States, Canada, Mexico
Kenworth	Kenworth T409SAR		Heavy	Conventional	–	Australia	Australia
Kenworth	Kenworth T359		Heavy	Conventional	–	Australia	Australia
Kenworth	Kenworth C500		Heavy	Conventional	–	United States	United States, Canada, Mexico
Kenworth	Kenworth C509		Heavy	Conventional	–	Australia	Australia
Kenworth	Kenworth T800		Heavy	Conventional	–	United States	United States, Canada, Mexico
Kenworth	Kenworth W900		Heavy	Conventional	–	United States	United States, Canada, Mexico
Kenworth	Kenworth T660		Heavy	Conventional	–	United States	United States, Canada, Mexico
Kenworth	Kenworth T659		Heavy	Conventional	–	Australia	Australia
Kenworth	Kenworth T700		Heavy	Conventional	–	United States	United States, Canada, Mexico
Kenworth	Kenworth T680		Heavy	Conventional	–	United States	United States, Canada, Mexico
Kenworth	Kenworth T880		Heavy	Conventional	–	United States	United States, Canada, Mexico
Kenworth	Kenworth T909		Heavy	Conventional	–	Australia	Australia
KrAZ	KrAZ-6322		Heavy	Conventional	KrAZ-63221, KrAZ-6446	Ukraine	Eastern Europe, South Eastern Asia, Cuba, Egypt
KrAZ	KrAZ-6505		Heavy	Conventional	KrAZ-65055, KrAZ-65053, KrAZ S18.0	Ukraine	Eastern Europe, South Eastern Asia, Cuba, Egypt
KrAZ	KrAZ-6510		Heavy	Conventional	KrAZ-650101	Ukraine	Eastern Europe, South Eastern Asia, Cuba, Egypt
KrAZ	KrAZ-6443		Heavy	Conventional	–	Ukraine	Eastern Europe, South Eastern Asia, Cuba, Egypt
KrAZ	KrAZ-5233		Heavy	Conventional	–	Ukraine	Eastern Europe, South Eastern Asia, Cuba, Egypt
KrAZ	KrAZ H12.2		Heavy	COE	KrAZ K12.2	Ukraine	Eastern Europe, South Eastern Asia, Cuba, Egypt
KrAZ	KrAZ H23.2		Heavy	COE	KrAZ-6511	Ukraine	Eastern Europe, South Eastern Asia, Cuba, Egypt
KrAZ	KrAZ S20.2		Heavy	COE	–	Ukraine	Eastern Europe, South Eastern Asia, Cuba, Egypt
KrAZ	KrAZ S26.2M		Heavy	COE	–	Ukraine	Eastern Europe, South Eastern Asia, Cuba, Egypt
KrAZ	KrAZ H27.3		Heavy	COE	–	Ukraine	Eastern Europe, South Eastern Asia, Cuba, Egypt
KrAZ	KrAZ-5401		Heavy	COE	–	Ukraine	Eastern Europe, South Eastern Asia, Cuba, Egypt
Mack Trucks	Mack Pinnacle Series		Heavy	Conventional	Mack Vision Elite(Venezuela and Peru)	United States	United States, Canada, Peru, Venezuela
Mack Trucks	Mack Titan		Heavy	Conventional	–	Australia	Australia, United States, Canada
Mack Trucks	Mack Granite		Heavy	Conventional	Mack Granite Elite(Peru and Venezuela)	United States	United States, Canada, Mexico, Venezuela, Peru, Australia
Mack Trucks	Mack TerraPro		Heavy	Conventional	–	United States	United States, Canada, Mexico
Mack Trucks	Mack Metro-Liner		Heavy	Conventional	–	Australia	Australia
Mack Trucks	Mack Super-Liner		Heavy	Conventional	–	Australia	Australia
Mahindra Navistar	Mahindra Navistar DI3200		Light	COE	–	India/United States	India
Mahindra Navistar	Mahindra Navistar Loadking Zoom		Light	COE	–	India/United States	India
Mahindra Navistar	Mahindra Navistar Torro		Medium	COE	–	India/United States	India
Mahindra Navistar	Mahindra Navistar Traco		Medium	COE	–	India/United States	India
Mahindra Navistar	Mahindra Navistar Truxo		Medium	COE	–	India/United States	India
Master	Master Highland		Light	COE	–	Pakistan	Pakistan
Master	Master Forland		Light	COE	–	Pakistan	Pakistan
Master	Master Foton		Light	COE	Foton Aumark Series	China	Pakistan
Master	Master Grande		Medium	COE	–	Pakistan	Pakistan
MAZ	MAZ-5309		Medium	COE	MAZ-6501	Belarus	Eastern Europe
MAZ	MAZ-4371		Medium	COE	–	Belarus	Eastern Europe
MAZ	MAZ-447131		Heavy	COE	MAZ-6430, MAZ-5440 А3	Belarus	Eastern Europe
MAZ	MAZ-6440		Heavy	Conventional	–	Belarus	Eastern Europe
MAZ	MAZ-6312		Heavy	COE	–	Belarus	Eastern Europe
MAZ	MAZ-5440		Heavy	COE	–	Belarus	Eastern Europe
MAZ	MAZ-5433		Heavy	COE	–	Belarus	Eastern Europe
Mercedes-Benz	Mercedes-Benz Atego		Light	COE	–	Germany	worldwide(except North America)
Mercedes-Benz	Mercedes-Benz Axor		Medium/Heavy	COE	–	Germany	worldwide(except North America)
Mercedes-Benz	Mercedes-Benz Unimog		Medium	Conventional	–	Germany	worldwide
Mercedes-Benz	Mercedes-Benz Zetros		Medium	Conventional	–	Germany	Europe
Mercedes-Benz	Mercedes-Benz Actros		Heavy	COE	–	Germany	Worldwide(except North America)
Mercedes-Benz	Mercedes-Benz Arocs		Heavy	COE	–	Germany	worldwide(except North America)
Mercedes-Benz	Mercedes-Benz Sprinter		Light	Conventional	Freightliner Sprinter	Germany	Europe, Ghana, Morocco, Algeria, Tunisia, South Africa, Nigeria, Australia, New Zealand, China, Middle East, North America, Latin America
Mitsubishi Fuso	Mitsubishi Fuso Canter		Light	COE	–	Japan	worldwide
Mitsubishi Fuso	Mitsubishi Fuso Fighter		Medium	COE	–	Japan	Asia, Oceania, Africa
Mitsubishi Fuso	Mitsubishi Fuso The Great		Heavy	COE	-	Japan	Japan
Mitsubishi Fuso	Mitsubishi Fuso Super Great		Heavy	COE	–	Japan	Japan, Asia-Pacific, Mid-East, Africa, South America
MZKT	MZKT – 75165		Medium	COE	MZKT – 65151, MZKT – 6527, MZKT – 652511	Belarus	Belarus
MZKT	MZKT – 7402		Heavy	COE	MZKT – 74171, MZKT – 74173, MZKT – 692374, MZKT – 7401, MZKT – 74171, MZKT – 692374, MZKT – 74132	Belarus	Belarus
MZKT	MZKT – 692371		Heavy	COE	MZKT – 692382, MZKT – 652511-2010, MZKT – 652513, MZKT – 652712, MZKT – 65271, MZKT – 65274, MZKT – 7001, MZKT – 7003, MZKT – 7004, MZKT – 79091, MZKT – 79092, MZKT – 790986, MZKT – 79191, MZKT – 69234 MZKT – 79081	Belarus	Belarus
Navistar International	International Citystar		Light	COE	–	Mexico(Formally United States)	Mexico
Navistar International	International LoadStar		Medium	COE	–	United States	United States, Canada
Navistar International	International TerraStar		Medium	Conventional	–	United States	United States, Canada
Navistar International	International DuraStar		Medium	Conventional	–	United States	United States, Canada, Mexico, Brazil, Middle East
Navistar International	International Transtar		Heavy	Conventional	–	United States	United States, Canada, South Africa
Navistar International	International 9200i		Heavy	Conventional	–	Mexico	Mexico
Navistar International	International 9400i		Heavy	Conventional	–	Mexico	Mexico
Navistar International	International 9800i		Heavy	COE	International 9800(South Africa)	Brazil	Brazil, South Africa
Navistar International	International 9900i		Heavy	Conventional	–	United States	United States, Canada, Mexico, Brazil
Navistar International	International LoneStar		Heavy	Conventional	–	United States	United States, Canada
Navistar International	International WorkStar		Heavy	Conventional	–	United States	United States, Canada, Mexico, Middle East, South Africa
Navistar International	International PayStar		Heavy	Conventional	–	United States	United States, Canada, Middle East
Navistar International	International ProStar+		Heavy	Conventional	International ProStar(Russia)	United States	United States, Canada, Mexico, Russia
Nissan	Nissan Atlas		light	COE	Nissan Cabstar(Europe, Australia, China), Nissan Atlas H41 Series(Malaysia), UD Kuzer UE Series(Malaysia), Renault Maxity, Renault Samsung SV110, UD Condor, Yue Loong Homer, Dong Feng Pahlawan, Isuzu N-Series	Japan	worldwide, except United States and Canada
Nissan	Renault Maxity		Light	COE	Nissan Cabstar(Europe, Australia, China), Nissan Atlas H41 Series(Malaysia), Nissan Atlas, Renault Samsung SV110, UD Condor, Yue Loong Homer, Dong Feng Pahlawan, Isuzu N-Series	Japan	Europe
Nissan	Nissan NT500		Light	COE		Japan	Europe, Asia, Africa, South America
MAN	MAN TGE		Light	COE	–	Poland	Europe, Asia
MAN	MAN TG L		Light	COE	–	Germany	Europe, Asia, Africa, South America
MAN	MAN TGM		Medium	COE	–	Germany	Europe, Asia, Africa, South America
MAN	MAN TGS		Heavy	COE	–	Germany	Europe, Asia, Africa, South America
MAN	MAN TGX		Heavy	COE	–	Germany	Europe, Asia, Africa, South America
Peterbilt	Peterbilt 210		Light	COE	Peterbilt 220	United States	United States, Canada, Mexico
Peterbilt	Peterbilt 320		Light	COE	–	United States	United States, Canada, Mexico
Peterbilt	Peterbilt 325		Medium	Conventional	–	United States	United States, Canada, Mexico
Peterbilt	Peterbilt 348		Medium	Conventional	Peterblit 337	United States	United States, Canada, Mexico
Peterbilt	Peterbilt 365		Medium	Conventional	Peterblit 365	United States	United States, Canada, Mexico
Peterbilt	Peterbilt 382		Heavy	Conventional	–	United States	United States, Canada, Mexico
Peterbilt	Peterbilt 384		Heavy	Conventional	–	United States	United States, Canada, Mexico
Peterblit	Peterbilt 386		Heavy	Conventional	–	United States	United States, Canada, Mexico
Peterbilt	Peterbilt 389		Heavy	Conventional	–	United States	United States, Canada, Mexico
Peterbilt	Peterbilt 587		Heavy	Conventional	–	United States	United States, Canada, Mexico
Peterbilt	Peterbilt 579		Heavy	Conventional	–	United States	United States, Canada, Mexico
Peugeot	Peugeot Boxer		Light	Conventional	Citroën Jumper, Fiat Ducato	Italy	Europe, Argentina
Renault Trucks	Renault Midlum		Light	COE	–	France	Worldwide, except United States, Canada, and Japan
Renault Trucks	Renault Access		Medium	COE	–	France	Worldwide, except United States, Canada, and Japan
Renault Trucks	Renault Kerax		Medium/Heavy	COE	–	France	Worldwide, except United States, Canada, and Japan
Renault Trucks	Renault Premium		Heavy	COE	–	France	Worldwide, except United States, Canada, and Japan
Renault Trucks	Renault C		Medium/Heavy	COE	–	France	Europe
Renault Trucks	Renault D		Medium	COE	–	France	Europe
Renault Trucks	Renault T		Heavy	COE	–	France	Europe
Roman	Roman 12.250 F		Medium	COE	–	Romania	Romania
SAIC-Iveco Hongyan	Hongyan Cargo Truck		Heavy	COE	–	China/Italy	China
SAIC-Iveco Hongyan	Hongyan Tractor		Heavy	COE	–	China/Italy	China
SAIC-Iveco Hongyan	Hongyan Dump Truck		Heavy	COE	–	China/Italy	China
SAIC-Iveco Hongyan	Hongyan Tanker Truck		Heavy	COE	–	China/Italy	China
Scania	Scania P-series		Medium/Heavy	COE	–	Sweden	Worldwide, except United States and Canada
Scania	Scania G-series		Medium/Heavy	COE	–	Sweden	Worldwide, except United States and Canada
Scania	Scania R-series		Heavy	COE	–	Sweden	Worldwide, except United States and Canada
Shaanxi	Shaanxi Olong Tractor Truck		Heavy	COE	–	China	China
Shaanxi	Shaanxi Delong Tractor Truck		Heavy	COE	–	China	China
Shacman	x3000		Heavy	–	–	China	China
Shacman	x6000		Heavy	–	–	China	China
Silant	Silant 3.3 TD		Light	Conventional	–	Russia	Russia
Sinotruk	Sinotruk Steyr		Medium	COE	–	China	China, Russia, Middle East
Sinotruk	Sinotruk HOWO T7H		Heavy	COE	–	China, Russia, Middle East	China, Russia, Middle East
Sinotruk	Sinotruk HOWO T5G		Heavy	COE	–	China	China, Russia, Middle East
Sisu	Sisu Polar		Heavy	COE	–	Finland	Europe
Sisu	Sisu Rock		Heavy	COE	Sisu Timber, Sisu Works, Sisu Crane	Finland	Europe
Smith	Smith Newton		Light	COE	–	United Kingdom	United Kingdom, United States, Canada
SML Isuzu	SML Super		Light	COE	–	India	India
SNVI	SNVI truck M120		Light	COE	–	Algeria	Africa
SNVI	SNVI truck TC260		Heavy	COE	–	Algeria	Africa
Tata	Tata Construck		Medium	COE	–	India	India
Tata	Tata Novus		Medium	COE	Tata Daewoo Novus	South Korea	India, Bangladesh, Thailand
Tata	Tata Prima		Heavy	COE	Tata Daewoo Prima	India	India, Bangladesh, Malaysia, Indonesia, Middle East (except Israel, Lebanon, Syria, Iran, Yemen), South Africa
Tata Daewoo	Tata Daewoo Novus		Medium	COE	Tata Novus	South Korea	South Korea, Philippines, Syria, Vietnam
Tata Daewoo	Tata Daewoo Prima		Heavy	COE	Tata Prima	India	South Korea, Philippines, Syria, Vietnam
Tatra Trucks	Tatra Phoenix		Heavy	COE	–	Czech Republic	worldwide, except North America
Tatra Trucks	Tatra T815 TerrN°2		Heavy	COE	–	Czech Republic	worldwide, except North America
Tatra Trucks	Tatra 810		Heavy	COE	–	Czech Republic	worldwide, except North America
Tatra Trucks	Tatra Jamal		Heavy	Conventional	–	Czech Republic	worldwide
Tevva	Tevva TEV75B		Medium	COE	–	United Kingdom	Europe
Toyota	Toyota Dyna		Light	COE	–	Japan	Japan, South East Asia, Europe
UAZ	UAZ-3303		Light	COE	–	Russia	Russia, Eastern Europe
UAZ	UAZ Cargo		Light	Conventional	–	Russia	Russia, Eastern Europe, Central Europe
UD Trucks	Nissan Cabstar		Light	COE	Nissan Atlas H41 Series(Malaysia), Nissan Atlas, Renault Maxity, Renault Samsung SV110, UD Condor, Yue Loong Homer, Dong Feng Pahlawan, Isuzu N-Series	Japan	Europe, Australia, China
UD Trucks	UD Condor		Light/Medium	COE	Nissan Cabstar(Europe, Australia, China), Nissan Atlas H41 Series(Malaysia), UD Kuzer UE Series(Malaysia), Nissan Atlas, Renault Maxity, Renault Samsung SV110, UD Condor, Yue Loong Homer, Dong Feng Pahlawan, Isuzu N-Series	Japan	Japan, United States, Canada
UD Trucks	UD Big Thumb		Heavy	COE	-	Japan	Japan, China
UD Trucks	UD Quon		Heavy	COE	–	Japan	Asia-Pacific, Mid-East, Africa, South America
UralAZ	Ural-4320		Heavy	Conventional	–	Russia	Russia, Eastern Europe, China, North Africa
UralAZ	Ural-43206		Medium	Conventional	–	Russia	Russia, Eastern Europe, China, North Africa
UralAZ	Ural-4320-3951		Heavy	COE	–	Russia	Russia
UralAZ	Ural-432065		Heavy	Cab front of the engine	–	Russia	Russia
UralAZ	Ural-44202		Heavy	Conventional	–	Russia	Russia, Eastern Europe
UralAZ	Ural-5323		Heavy	COE	–	Russia	Russia, Eastern Europe
UralAZ	Ural-6368		Heavy	COE	–	Russia	Russia, Eastern Europe
UralAZ	Ural-6370		Heavy	COE	–	Russia	Russia, Eastern Europe
UralAZ	Ural Next		Heavy	COE	–	Russia	Russia, Eastern Europe
Volkswagen Truck & Bus	Volkswagen Constellation		Medium/Heavy	COE	–	Brazil	Brazil, Mexico, Nigeria, South Africa
Volkswagen Commercial Vehicles	Volkswagen Crafter		Light	Conventional	–	Poland	Europe, Mexico, Taiwan, South Africa, Australia, New Zealand
Volkswagen Truck & Bus	Volkswagen Delivery		Light	COE	–	Brazil	Brazil, Mexico, Nigeria, South Africa
Volkswagen Truck & Bus	Volkswagen Worker		Medium	COE	–	Brazil	Brazil, Mexico, Nigeria, South Africa
Volvo Trucks	Volvo FE		Medium	COE	–	Sweden	Europe, Middle East, Australia
Volvo Trucks	Volvo FM		Heavy	COE	–	Sweden	Europe, Africa, Asia, South America, Oceania
Volvo Trucks	Volvo VHD		Medium	COE	–	United States	United States, Canada, Mexico
Volvo Trucks	Volvo VM		Medium	COE	–	Sweden	South America
Volvo Trucks	Volvo FH		Heavy	COE	–	Sweden	Europe, Africa, Asia, South America, Oceania
Volvo Trucks	Volvo FMX		Heavy	COE	–	Sweden	Europe, Africa, Asia, South America, Oceania
Volvo Trucks	Volvo VN		Heavy	Conventional	–	United States	United States, Canada, Mexico
Volvo Trucks	Volvo VNX		Heavy	Conventional	–	United States	United States, Canada, Mexico
Wanshan Special Vehicle	WS5250		Military Heavy	Cabin before engine		China	China
Wanshan Special Vehicle	WS5470		Military Heavy	Cabin before engine		China	China
Wuzheng Auto Works	A series		Light	Cabin before engine		China	China
Wuzheng Auto Works	V series		Light	Cabin before engine		China	China
Wuzheng Auto Works	D series		Light	Cabin before engine		China	China
Western Star	Western Star 4700		Heavy	Conventional	Western Star 4700SB(Australia, New Zealand)	United States/Canada	North America, Australia, New Zealand
Western Star	Western Star 4800		Heavy	Conventional	–	United States/Canada	North America
Western Star	Western Star 4900		Heavy	Conventional	Western Star 4800/4900/5800/6900(Australia, New Zealand)	United States/Canada	North America, Australia, New Zealand
Western Star	Western Star 6900		Heavy	Conventional	–	United States/Canada	North America
Yulon	Yue Loong Homer		Light	COE	Nissan Cabstar(Europe, Australia, China), Nissan Atlas H41 Series(Malaysia), UD Kuzer UE Series(Malaysia), Nissan Atlas, Renault Maxity, Renault Samsung SV110, UD Condor, Dong Feng Pahlawan, Isuzu N-Series	Taiwan	Taiwan
Zastava Trucks	Zastava EuroZeta		Light	COE	–	Serbia	Europe
Zastava Trucks	Zastava ZK-101		Light	COE	–	Serbia	Europe
ZiL	ZIL-4327		Medium	Conventional	–	Russia	Russia
ZiL	ZIL-4331		Heavy	Conventional	ZIL-432930, ZIL-433360	Russia	Russia
ZiL	ZIL-5301 "Bychok"		Medium	Conventional	–	Russia	Russia, Eastern Europe

== Discontinued ==
Manufacturer	Model	Image	Class	Cabin	Also called	Country of origin	Reason(s) for discontinuation
Agricola	Agricola 25 GT 4x4		Medium	Conventional	–	Greece	Unknown
Alfa Romeo	Alfa Romeo A15		Light	COE	Alfa Romeo A19; Alfa Romeo A38	Italy	Unknown
Alfa Romeo	Alfa Romeo 50		Medium	Conventional	–	Italy	Unknown
Alfa Romeo	Alfa Romeo 85		Medium	Conventional	Alfa Romeo 110; Büssing LS77	Italy	Unknown
Alfa Romeo	Alfa Romeo 350		Medium	Conventional	–	Italy	the truck was too heavy and too expensive
Alfa Romeo	Alfa Romeo 430		Heavy	COE	–	Italy	Unknown
Alfa Romeo	Alfa Romeo 900		Heavy	COE	–	Italy	Unknown
Alfa Romeo	Alfa Romeo 950		Heavy	COE	–	Italy	Unknown
Alfa Romeo	Alfa Romeo Mille		Heavy	COE	Alfa Romeo 1000; FNM 180 series	Italy	Unknown
Alfa Romeo	Alfa Romeo 500		Heavy	Conventional	–	Italy	Unknown
Alfa Romeo	Alfa Romeo 800		Heavy	Conventional	–	Italy	Replaced by the Alfa Romeo 900
Avia	Avia A15		Light	COE	Avia A20, Avia A21	Czechoslovakia	unknown
Avia	Avia A30		Medium	COE	Avia A31	Czechoslovakia	replaced to Avia A60/65/75
Avia	Avia A60/65/75/80		Medium	COE	–	Czech Republic	replaced to Avia D Series
Amur	AMUR-531350		Medium	Conventional	–	Russia	bankruptcy of Amur company
Barkas	Barkas B1000		Light	COE	–	East Germany	bankruptcy plant
Bering Truck	Bering LD15		Light	COE	–	United States	Daimler-Chrysler forced Bering to cease operations
Bering Truck	Bering MD23		Medium	COE	Bering MD26	United States	Daimler-Chrysler forced Bering to cease operations
Bering Truck	Bering HDMX		Heavy	COE	–	United States	Daimler-Chrysler forced Bering to cease operations
BMC	BMC Megastar		Light	Conventional	–	Turkey	Unknown
Büssing	Büssing Commodore		Medium	COE	–	Germany	Unknown
Büssing	Büssing BS 16 L		Medium	COE	–	Germany	Unknown
Büssing	MAN Büssing		Medium	COE	–	Germany	Unknown
Büssing	Büssing LS 77		Medium	Conventional	–	Germany	Unknown
Csepel	Csepel D350		Medium	Conventional	Csepel D352	Hungary	unknown
Csepel	Csepel D400/D420		Medium	Conventional	–	Hungary	replaced to Csepel D344
Csepel	Csepel D450		Medium	Conventional	–	Hungary	unknown
Csepel	Csepel D344		Medium	Conventional	–	Hungary	unknown
Csepel	Csepel 700 Series		Heavy	COE	–	Hungary	unknown
Csepel	Csepel D452/D453		Medium, Heavy	COE	–	Hungary	unknown
Csepel	Csepel D708		Heavy	COE		Hungary	replaced to Csepel D730
Csepel	Csepel D730		Heavy	COE		Hungary	unknown
Csepel	Csepel D717		Heavy	COE		Hungary	unknown
Csepel	Csepel D750		Heavy	COE		Hungary	replaced to Csepel D752 Series
Csepel	Csepel D752 Series		Heavy	COE		Hungary	unprofitability
Diamond T	Diamond T 630		Light	Conventional	–	United States	Merger with Reo Motor Company
Diamond T	Diamond T 969A Wercker		Medium	Conventional	–	United States	Merger with Reo Motor Company
Ernst Grube	Ernst Grube H6		Heavy	Conventional	–	East Germany	unknown
Ernst Grube	Sachsenring S4000-1		Medium	Conventional	–	East Germany	replaced to IFA W50
Ernst Grube	Ernst Grube G5		Heavy	Conventional	–	East Germany	unknown
Fabrika automobila Priboj (FAP)	FAP 13.14		Heavy	Conventional	FAP 16.20	Yugoslavia	unknown
FAP	FAP 18.20		Heavy	COE	–	Yugoslavia	unknown
FAP	FAP 22.22		Heavy	COE	–	Yugoslavia	unknown
FAP	FAP 19.21		Heavy	COE	–	Yugoslavia	unknown
FAP	FAP 19.215		Heavy	COE	–	Yugoslavia	unknown
FAP	FAP 15.16/15.20		Heavy	COE	–	Yugoslavia	unknown
FAP	FAP 10.16		Heavy	COE	–	Yugoslavia	unknown
FAP	FAP 1213/1216		Medium	COE	–	Yugoslavia	unknown
FAP	FAP 1620		Heavy	COE	–	Yugoslavia	unknown
Fabryka Samochodów Ciężarowych (FSC)	FSC Żuk		Light	COE	–	Poland	replaced to FSC Lublin
Faun	F 60/365		Heavy	Conventional	Faun Prime Mover	Germany	Division of the company
FSC	FSC Lublin		Light	Conventional	–	Poland	bankruptcy
FSC Star	Star 20		Medium	COE	Star W14, Star C60	Poland	replaced to Star 21
FSC Star	Star 21		Medium	COE	–	Poland	replaced to Star 25
FSC Star	Star 66		Medium	COE		Poland	replaced to Star 660
FSC Star	Star 25		Medium	COE	Star C25, Star 25L, Star W25, Star 3W25	Poland	replaced to Star 27
FSC Star	Star 27		Medium, Heavy	COE	Star A83, Star A88	Poland	replaced to Star 28 and Star 29
FSC Star	Star 660		Medium	COE	–	Poland	replaced to Star 266
FSC Star	Star 28/29		Heavy	COE	–	Poland	replaced to Star 200
FSC Star	Star 200		Heavy	COE	Star 200L, Star C200	Poland	replaced to Star 1142
FSC Star	Star 244		Heavy	COE	Star 3W244, Star 244RS	Poland	unknown
FSC Star	Star 266		Medium	COE	–	Poland	unknown
FSC Star	Star 742		Medium	COE	–	Poland	unknown
FSC Star	Star 744		Medium	COE	–	Poland	unknown
FSC Star	Star 1142		Heavy	COE	Star 1142T, Star C1142T	Poland	unknown
FSC Star	Star 1466		Heavy	COE	–	Poland	unknown
FSC Star	Star 8.125		Medium	COE	–	Poland	Membership in the MAN Nutzfahrzeuge group
FSC Star	Star 12.157		Heavy	COE	–	Poland	Membership in the MAN Nutzfahrzeuge group
Star	Star S2000		Medium	COE	–	Poland	factory became a branch of the MAN and began producing buses
Star	Star 14.227		Heavy	COE	–	Poland	factory became a branch of the MAN and began producing buses
GAZ	GAZ-AA		Light	Conventional	GAZ-MM	USSR	replaced to GAZ-51
GAZ	GAZ-AAA		Light	Conventional	–	USSR	discontinued because of the bombing of the plant during the Great Patriotic War
GAZ	GAZ-51		Medium	Conventional	FSC Lublin-51, Sungri-51, Yuejin NJ130	USSR	replaced to GAZ-52 and GAZ-53
GAZ	GAZ-63		Medium	Conventional	Sungri-58	USSR	replaced to GAZ-66
GAZ	GAZ-52 and GAZ-53		Medium	Conventional	–	USSR	replaced to GAZ-3307 and GAZ-3309
GAZ	GAZ-66		Medium	COE	–	USSR	replaced to GAZ-3308 Sadko
Goliath	Goliath GD 750		Light	Conventional	–	Germany	bankruptcy in 1961
Horch	Horch H3		Medium	COE	–	East Germany	replaced to Horch H3A
Horch	Horch H3A		Medium	Conventional	–	East Germany	plant renamed Sachsenring
Industrieverband Fahrzeugbau (IFA), Industriewerke Ludwigsfelde plant	IFA W50		Heavy	COE	IFA W50L/K, IFA W50L/NKP, IFA W50L/S	East Germany	after German reunification plant returned to the former owner, Daimler-Benz
Industrieverband Fahrzeugbau (IFA), Industriewerke Ludwigsfelde plant	IFA W50LA		Heavy	COE	–	East Germany	after German reunification plant returned to the former owner, Daimler-Benz
zeugbau (IFA), Industriewerke Ludwigsfelde plant	IFA L60/1218		Heavy	COE	–	East Germany	after German reunification plant returned to the former owner, Daimler-Benz
Industrieverband Fahrzeugbau (IFA), Industriewerke Ludwigsfelde plant	IFA L60/1218PB		Heavy	COE	–	East Germany	after German reunification plant returned to the former owner, Daimler-Benz
International Motors	International 9300		Heavy	COE	–	United States	replaced by „NGV“ trucks in 2001
Jelcz	Zubr A80		Heavy	COE	–	Poland	replaced to Jelcz 300 Series
Jelcz	Jelcz 300 Series		Heavy	COE	Jelcz 316, Jelcz 3W-317, Jelcz 317	Poland	replaced to Jelcz 400 Series
Jelcz	Jelcz 640 Series		Heavy	COE	–	Poland	unknown
Jelcz	Jelcz 410 series		Heavy	COE	Jelcz 415, Jelcz 417	Poland	unknown
Jelcz	Jelcz 600 series		Heavy	COE	Jelcz C620, Jelcz C622	Poland	unknown
Kaelble	Kaelble K 632 ZB		Heavy	Conventional	Kaelble K Prime Mover	Germany	Insolvency in 1996
Kutaisi Automobile Plant	KAZ-606 Colchis		Heavy	COE	–	USSR	replaced to KAZ-608
Kutaisi Automobile Plant	KAZ-608 Colchis		Heavy	COE	–	USSR	replaced to KAZ-608B
Kutaisi Automobile Plant	KAZ-608B Colchis		Heavy	COE	–	USSR	discontinued due to rupture of industrial relations and the difficult economic situation in Georgia after the collapse of the Soviet Union
Kutaisi Automobile Plant	KAZ-4540		Heavy	cabin before engine	–	USSR	discontinued due to rupture of industrial relations and the difficult economic situation in Georgia after the collapse of the Soviet Union
KrAZ	KrAZ-219		Heavy	Conventional	–	USSR	replaced to KrAZ-257
KrAZ	KrAZ-221		Heavy	Conventional	–	USSR	replaced to KrAZ-258
KrAZ	KrAZ-222		Heavy	Conventional	–	USSR	replaced to KrAZ-256B
KrAZ	KrAZ-214		Heavy	Conventional	–	USSR	replaced to KrAZ-255B
KrAZ	KrAZ-257		Heavy	Conventional	–	USSR	replaced to KrAZ-250
KrAZ	KrAZ-258		Heavy	Conventional	–	USSR	replaced to KrAZ-6443
KrAZ	KrAZ-256B		Heavy	Conventional	–	USSR	replaced to KrAZ-6510
KrAZ	KrAZ-255		Heavy	Conventional	–	USSR	replaced to KrAZ-260
KrAZ	KrAZ-250		Heavy	Conventional	–	USSR	
KrAZ	KrAZ-260		Heavy	Conventional	–	USSR	replaced to KrAZ-6322
KZKT	KZKT-535		Heavy	Cabin before engine	–	USSR	replaced to KZKT-537
KZKT	KZKT-537		Heavy	Cabin before engine	–	USSR	replaced to KZKT-7428
KZKT	KZKT-7428 Rusich		Heavy	Cabin before engine	–	Russia	bankruptcy plant
KZKT	KZKT-8005		Extra heavy	Cabin before engine	–	Russia	bankruptcy plant
Leyland Motors	Landtrain		Heavy	Conventional		United Kingdom	
LIAZ	LiAZ 100 Series		Heavy	COE	LiAZ 110, LiAZ 150, LiAZ 152	Czechoslovakia	Plant bought Skoda concern; production continued under the brand Škoda-LIAZ
LiAZ	LiAZ 200 Series		Heavy	COE	–	Chezhoslovakia	Plant bought Skoda concern; production continued under the brand Škoda-LIAZ
LiAZ	LiAZ S/FZ Series		Heavy/Medium	COE	–	Czech Republic	Plant bought Skoda concern; production continued under the brand Škoda-LIAZ
LiAZ	LiAZ 300 Series		Heavy	COE	–	Czech Republic	Plant bought Skoda concern; production continued under the brand Škoda-LIAZ
MAN	MAN 758		Heavy	Conventional	–	Germany	unknown
MAN	MAN E 2		Medium	Conventional	–	Germany	end of war
Minsk Automobile Plant (MAZ)	MAZ-200		Heavy	Conventional	–	USSR	replaced to MAZ-500
Minsk Automobile Plant (MAZ)	MAZ-205		Heavy	Conventional	–	USSR	replaced to MAZ-503
Minsk Automobile Plant (MAZ)	MAZ-535		Heavy	Cabin before engine	–	USSR	production moved to KZKT
Minsk Automobile Plant (MAZ)	MAZ-501		Heavy	Conventional	–	USSR	replaced to MAZ-509
Minsk Automobile Plant (MAZ)	MAZ-502		Heavy	Conventional	–	USSR	unknown
Minsk Automobile Plant (MAZ)	MAZ-537		Heavy	Cabin before engine	–	USSR	production moved to KZKT
Minsk Automobile Plant (MAZ)	MAZ-543		Extra heavy	engine between the two cabins located on the right and left sides	MAZ-7310	USSR	unknown
Minsk Automobile Plant (MAZ)	MAZ-500		Heavy	COE	–	USSR	replaced to MAZ-5335
Minsk Automobile Plant (MAZ)	MAZ-503		Heavy	COE	–	USSR	replaced to MAZ-5549
Minsk Automobile Plant (MAZ)	MAZ-504		Heavy	COE	–	USSR	replaced to MAZ-5429
Minsk Automobile Plant (MAZ)	MAZ-516		Heavy	COE	MAZ-516A	USSR	replaced to
Minsk Automobile Plant (MAZ)	MAZ-509		Heavy	COE	–	USSR	replaced to MAZ-509A
Minsk Automobile Plant (MAZ)	MAZ-5335		Heavy	COE	MAZ-5334	USSR	replaced to MAZ-5336
Minsk Automobile Plant (MAZ)	MAZ-5549		Heavy	COE	–	USSR	replaced to MAZ-5551
Minsk Automobile Plant (MAZ)	MAZ-5429		Heavy	COE	–	USSR	replaced to MAZ-6422
Multicar	Multicar M24		Light	COE	–	East Germany	replaced to Multicar M25
Multicar	Multicar M25		Light	COE	–	East Germany	replaced to Multicar M26
Multicar	Multicar M26		Light	COE	–	Germany	unknown
MAN	MAN HX		Heavy	Cabin before engine	–	Germany	unknown
Praga	Praga N		Medium	Conventional	–	Czechoslovakia	unknown
Praga	Praga L		Medium	Conventional	–	Czechoslovakia	unknown
Praga	Praga AN		Light	Conventional	–	Czechoslovakia	unknown
Praga	Praga ND/SND		Heavy	Conventional	–	Czechoslovakia	unknown
Praga	Praga TN/TNHP		Heavy	Conventional	–	Czechoslovakia	unknown
Praga	Praga TOV		Heavy	Conventional	–	Czechoslovakia	unknown
Praga	Praga RN/RND		Medium	Conventional	Praga SV	Czechoslovakia	unknown
Praga	Praga V3S		Medium	Conventional	Praga V3S-S	Czechoslovakia	unknown
Praga	Praga S5T		Heavy	Conventional	Avia S5T-2	Czechoslovakia	unknown
Praga	Praga S5T-2TN		Heavy	COE	–	Czechoslovakia	unknown
Praga	Praga UV80		Medium multipurpose	COE	–	Czechoslovakia	production moved to the factory Intrall
Praga	Praga NTS-265		Heavy multipurpose	COE	–	Czech Republic	production moved to the factory Intrall
Renault Trucks	Renault GBH 280		Heavy	Conventional	–	France	unknown
Renault Trucks	Renault Magnum		Heavy	COE	–	France	Replaced by the Renault T
Riga Autobus Factory	RAF-33111		Light	COE	–	Latvia	bankruptcy plant
Sachsenring	Sachsenring S4000		Medium	Conventional	–	East Germany	production moved to the factory Ernst Grube (see above)
Škoda	Skoda 304/306		Medium	Conventional	–	Czechoslovakia	unknown
Skoda	Skoda-Sentinel		Heavy	COE	–	Czechoslovakia	unknown
Skoda-Laurin & Klement	Skoda-Laurin-Klement-505/545		Medium	Conventional	–	Czechoslovakia	unknown
Skoda-Laurin-Klement	Skoda-Laurin-Klement-125		Light	Conventional	–	Czechoslovakia	unknown
Skoda	Skoda-550		Heavy	Conventional	–	Czechoslovakia	unknown
Skoda	Skoda-104/154		Light	Conventional	–	Czechoslovakia	unknown
Skoda	Skoda-304/306		Medium	Conventional	–	Czechoslovakia	unknown
Skoda	Skoda-504/506		Heavy	Conventional	–	Czechoslovakia	unknown
Skoda	Skoda-404D/606D		Medium	Conventional	–	Czechoslovakia	unknown
Skoda	Skoda-206		Light	Conventional	–	Czechoslovakia	unknown
Skoda	Skoda-656D/806D		Heavy	Conventional	–	Czechoslovakia	unknown
Skoda	Skoda-254D		Medium	Conventional	–	Czechoslovakia	unknown
Skoda	Skoda-100/150		Light	Conventional	–	Czechoslovakia	unknown
Skoda	Skoda-256B		Medium	Conventional	–	Czechoslovakia	unknown
Skoda	Skoda-706D		Heavy	Conventional	–	Czechoslovakia	replaced to Skoda-706R
Skoda	Skoda-706R		Heavy	Conventional	–	Czechoslovakia	replaced to Skoda-706RT
Skoda-LIAZ	Skoda-706RT		Heavy	COE	Skoda-706RTDA, Skoda-706RTS,Skoda-706RTTN	Czechoslovakia	replaced to LIAZ-100 series (see above)
Skoda-LIAZ	Skoda-LIAZ-706MT		Heavy	COE	Skoda-LIAZ-706MTTN, Skoda-LIAZ-706MTS	Czechoslovakia	replaced to LIAZ-100 Series
Skoda	Škoda 1203		Light	COE	–	Czechoslovakia	production was transferred to the TAZ plant
Skoda-LIAZ	Skoda-LiAZ 100 Series		Heavy	COE	Skoda-LIAZ 110, Skoda-LiAZ 150, Skoda-LiAZ 152	Czech Republic	bankruptcy
Skoda-LIAZ	Skoda-LiAZ 200 Series		Heavy	COE	–	Czech Republic	unknown
Skoda-LIAZ	Skoda-LiAZ S/FZ Series		Heavy/Medium	COE	–	Czech Republic	bankruptcy
Skoda-LIAZ	Skoda-LiAZ 300 Series		Heavy	COE	–	Czech Republic	bankruptcy
Skoda-LIAZ	Skoda-LIAZ-Xena		Heavy	COE	–	Czech Republic	bankruptcy
Sterling Trucks	Sterling 360		Light	COE	Mitsubishi Fuso Canter	Japan	Daimler closed down the Sterling Truck factory
Sterling Trucks	Sterling Acterra		Medium	Conventional	–	United States	Daimler closed down the Sterling Truck factory
Sterling Trucks	Sterling Set Forward L-Line		Medium	Conventional	–	United States	Daimler closed down the Sterling Truck factory
Sterling Trucks	Sterling Set Back L-Line		Heavy	Conventional	–	United States	Daimler closed down the Sterling Truck factory
Sterling Trucks	Sterling Set Back A-Line		Heavy	Conventional	–	United States	Daimler closed down the Sterling Truck factory
Tatra	Tatra TL4		Medium	Conventional	–	Czechoslovakia	unknown
Tatra	Tatra 13		Light	Conventional	–	Czechoslovakia	unknown
Tatra	Tatra 26		Light	Conventional	–	Czechoslovakia	unknown
Tatra	Tatra T23		Medium	COE	–	Czechoslovakia	unknown
Tatra	Tatra T24		Heavy	COE	–	Czechoslovakia	unknown
Tatra	Tatra T43/T52		Light	Conventional	–	Czechoslovakia	unknown
Tatra	Tatra T27		Medium	Conventional	–	Czechoslovakia	unknown
Tatra	Tatra 82		Light	Conventional	–	Czechoslovakia	unknown
Tatra	Tatra T92		Light	Conventional	–	Czechoslovakia	unknown
Tatra	Tatra T93		Light	Conventional	–	Czechoslovakia	unknown
Tatra	Tatra T85/T91		Medium, Heavy	Conventional	–	Czechoslovakia	unknown
Tatra	Tatra T81		Heavy	Conventional	–	Czechoslovakia	unknown
Tatra	Tatra T111		Heavy	Conventional	–	Czechoslovakia	replaced to Tatra T138
Tatra	Tatra T128		Medium	Conventional	–	Czechoslovakia	unknown
Tatra	Tatra T141		Heavy	Conventional	–	Czechoslovakia	replaced to Tatra T813
Tatra	Tatra T805		Medium	COE	–	Czechoslovakia	unknown
Tatra	Tatra T138		Heavy	Conventional	Tatra T137	Czechoslovakia	replaced to Tatra T148
Tatra	Tatra T813		Heavy, Extra heavy	COE	–	Czechoslovakia	replaced to Tatra T815
Tatra	Tatra T148		Heavy	Conventional	–	Czechoslovakia	replaced to Tatra T815
Tatra	Tatra T815		Heavy	COE	–	Czechoslovakia	replaced to Tatra T815 TerrNo1
Tatra	Tatra T815 TerrNo1		Heavy	COE	–	Czech Republic	replaced to Tatra T815 TerrNo2 (see above)
Trnavské automobilové závody (TAZ)	TAZ 1500		Light	COE	–	Slovakia	unknown
UralZIS	UralZIS-355M		Medium	Conventional	–	USSR	unknown
UralAZ	Ural-375		Medium	Conventional	–	USSR	replaced to Ural-4320
UralAZ	Ural-377		Heavy	Conventional	–	USSR	unknown
UralAZ	Ural-4322		Medium	Conventional	–	USSR	unknown
VEB Fahrzeugwerk Mölkau	IFA Picco max 4		Light	COE	–	Eastern Germany	unknown
VEB Robur-Werke	Robur Garant		Medium	Conventional	–	East Germany	replaced to Robur LO 2500/LD2500
VEB Robur-Werke	Robur LO 2500/LD2500		Medium	COE	–	East Germany	replaced to Robur LO 2501
VEB Robur-Werke	Robur Lo 1800A		Light	COE	–	East Germany	replaced to Robur 1801A
VEB Robur-Werke	Robur LO/LD 2501		Medium	COE	–	East Germany	replaced to Robur LO/LD3000
VEB Robur-Werke	Robur 1801A		Light	COE	–	East Germany	replaced to Robur LO2002
VEB Robur-Werke	Robur LO/LD 3000		Medium	COE	–	East Germany	replaced to Robur LD/LO 3001/3002
VEB Robur-Werke	Robur LO 2202A		Medium	COE	–	East Germany	unknown
VEB Robur-Werke	Robur LD/LO 3001/3002		Medium	COE	–	East Germany	replaced to Robur LD3004
Robur-Werke	Robur LD3004		Medium	COE	–	Germany	plant was bought Daimler-Benz and closed
Willème	Willème LD 610		Medium	Conventional	–	France	bankrupt in 1970
YaAZ	Ya-3		Medium	Conventional	–	USSR	replaced to Ya-4
YaAZ	Ya-4		Medium	Conventional	–	USSR	replaced to Ya-5
YaAZ	Ya-5		Heavy	Conventional	Ya-5 Koju	USSR	replaced to YaG-3
YaAZ	YaG-3		Heavy	Conventional	YaG-4, YaS-1	USSR	replaced to YaG-6
YaAZ	YaG-10		Heavy	Conventional		USSR	unknown
YaAZ	YaG-6		Heavy	Conventional	YaS-3	USSR	production ceased because Great Patriotic War
YaAZ	YaAZ-200		Heavy	Conventional	YaAZ-205, MAZ-200, MAZ-205	USSR	production moved to MAZ
YaAZ	YaAZ-210		Heavy	Conventional	KrAZ-219	USSR	production moved to KrAZ
YaAZ	YaAZ-214		Heavy	Conventional	KrAZ-214	USSR	production moved to KrAZ
YaAZ	YaAZ-221		Heavy	Conventional		USSR	unknown
YaAZ	YaAZ-222		Heavy	Conventional	KrAZ-222	USSR	production moved to KrAZ
ZIS	ZIS-5		Medium	Conventional	ZIS-50, UralZIS-5, UralZIS-355	USSR	Replaced to ZIS-150 and UralZIS-355M
ZIS	ZIS-6		Medium	Conventional	–	USSR	discontinued because of the Great Patriotic War
ZIS	ZIS-150		Medium	Conventional	KAZ-150, ZIS-164, Steagul Roşu SR-101, Jiefang CA-10	USSR	replaced to ZIL-130
ZIS	ZIS-151		Medium	Conventional	Jiefang CA-30	USSR	replaced to ZIL-157
ZIL	ZIL-157		Medium	Conventional	ZIL-157KD	USSR	replaced to ZIL-131
ZIL	ZIL-130		Heavy	Conventional	–	USSR	replaced to ZIL-4331 and ZIL-431410
ZIL	ZIL-131		Medium	Conventional	Amur-521320	USSR	replaced to ZIL-4334; bankruptcy of Amur company
ZIL	ZIL-133		Heavy	Conventional	–	USSR	replaced to ZIL-6309
ZIL	ZIL-4334		Heavy	Conventional	–	Russia	lack of orders
ZIL	ZIL-6309		Heavy	Conventional	–	Russia	unknown
Zmaj	Zmaj-3200		Medium	COE	–	Yugoslavia	unknown

== See also ==
- Truck
- List of low cab forward trucks
- List of pickup trucks
- List of military trucks
