= List of low cab forward trucks =

A low cab forward (LCF) truck is a type of cab over or cab forward truck with a low cab height and greater ease of entry. They are typically light duty or medium duty, as opposed to a heavy-duty cab-over truck such as a tractor unit. This contrasts with a conventional truck where the engine is mounted in front of the driver.

== Light duty ==
- Avia D
- Isuzu N-series (NPR, NQR, NRR, etc.)
- Mitsubishi Fuso Canter
- GMC W4 Forward
- Chevrolet 4500 HD, 5500 HD, 6500 HD/XD LCF
- Hyundai Mighty
- Hyundai Porter
- Hino Dutro
- Hyundai HD45
- Hyundai HD65/HD72/HD78
- Kia Bongo
- Mazda Titan
- UD Trucks series (1400 1800HD, 1800CS, etc.)
- Hino series (145, 165, 185, etc.)
- Toyota Dyna
- Tata LPT 613

== Medium duty ==
- DAF LF
- Ford Cargo
- Ford LCF, International CF600
- GMC W6/W7 Forward
- Hino Ranger
- Hyundai HD120/HD210
- Hyundai Mega Truck
- Hyundai Pavise
- Isuzu Forward
- Iveco EuroCargo
- Mercedes-Benz Atego
- Mitsubishi Fuso Fighter
- Mercedes-Benz Antos
- MAN TGL
- MAN TGM
- Nissan Diesel Condor
- Renault Midlum
- Renault Trucks D
- Scania L, P series
- Volvo FL
- Volvo FE

== Large capacity ==
- DAF CF
- DAF XF
- Ford F-MAX (Turkey)
- Hino Profia
- Hyundai HD1000
- Hyundai Trago
- Hyundai Xcient
- Isuzu Giga
- Iveco Stralis
- Mercedes-Benz Axor
- Mercedes-Benz Arocs
- Mitsubishi Fuso Super Great
- Mercedes-Benz Actros
- Nissan Diesel Quon
- Renault AE
- Renault Premium
- Renault Trucks T
- Renault Kerax
- Renault Trucks C
- Renault Trucks K
- Scania G, R series
- Volvo FH
- Volvo FM
- MAN TGA
- MAN TGS
- MAN TGX

== See also ==
- List of trucks
- Aircraft tug
- Cab over
- Semi-trailer truck
- Terminal tractor
