= Alfa Romeo 85 =

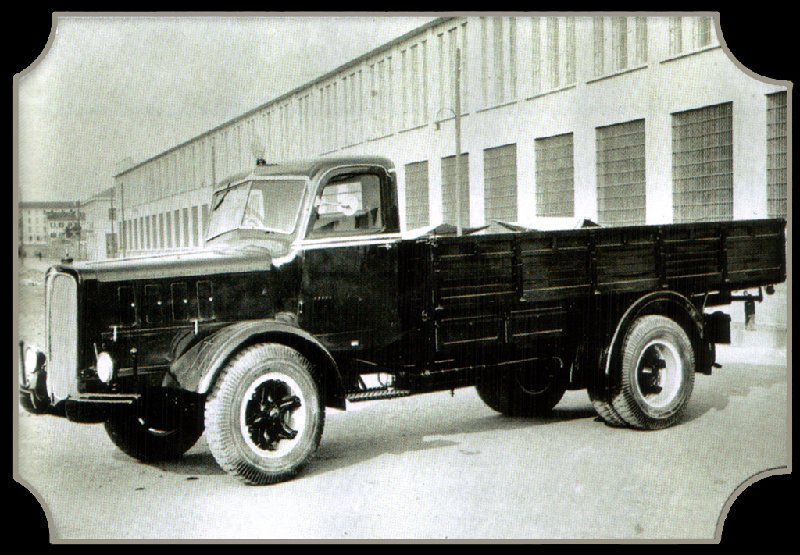

Overview
- Manufacturer: Alfa Romeo
- Production: 1934 - 1939

Body and chassis
- Class: Commercial vehicle

Powertrain
- Engine: 11,560 cc 6-cyl diesel 12,517 cc gas powered engine

Chronology
- Predecessor: Alfa Romeo 50
- Successor: Alfa Romeo 800

The Alfa Romeo 85 is a truck produced by Alfa Romeo between 1934 and 1939, it was an updated version of licensed Büssing model.

== History ==
Three versions were available: 85 (5.2 meters), 85 C (4.6 meters) and 85 G was (gas generator) version was produced since 1935. There was also bus version 85 A, replacing previous 40 N. In 1938 10-ton tri-axle version "110" was shown, it was equipped with 125 PS (92 kW; 123 hp) engine and was used as a basis for city buses.

With the presentation of the 350 medium truck in 1935, the 85 was updated aesthetically with the adoption of openable air vents on the hood; two years later the grille was redesigned, resuming that of the 500.

Production ceased in 1939, following a decree requiring the construction of a unified truck model complying with the military specifications of the Royal Italian Army. 21 85 long wheelbase, 370 85 C, 33 85 CG, 94 85 A, 2 85 AG and 1 85 AM were produced.

== Technical characteristics ==
The Alfa Romeo 85 was equipped with a six-cylinder 11,560 cc diesel engine (type F6M 317E) producing 110 PS (81 kW; 108 hp) . This engine was the same as that which was mounted on the Alfa Romeo 80 and 110 A, and was later upgraded to 125 PS. Gas powered version used AG6 engine with 12.517 cc, produced 110 PS (81 kW; 108 hp) and it used of 140–180 kg of wood per 100 km. The 85 AM methane engine had the same displacement as 85 gas version and had power of 160 PS.

== Production ==
521 examples were produced : 21 85L, 370 85C, 33 85CG, 94 85A, 2 85AG and 1 85AM.

== Bibliografia ==
- Stefano Salvetti, L'altra Alfa, Fucina Editore, Milano, 2014, ISBN 978-88-88269-38-2
