= Alfa Romeo 430 =

Alfa Romeo 430 Alfa Romeo 430RE
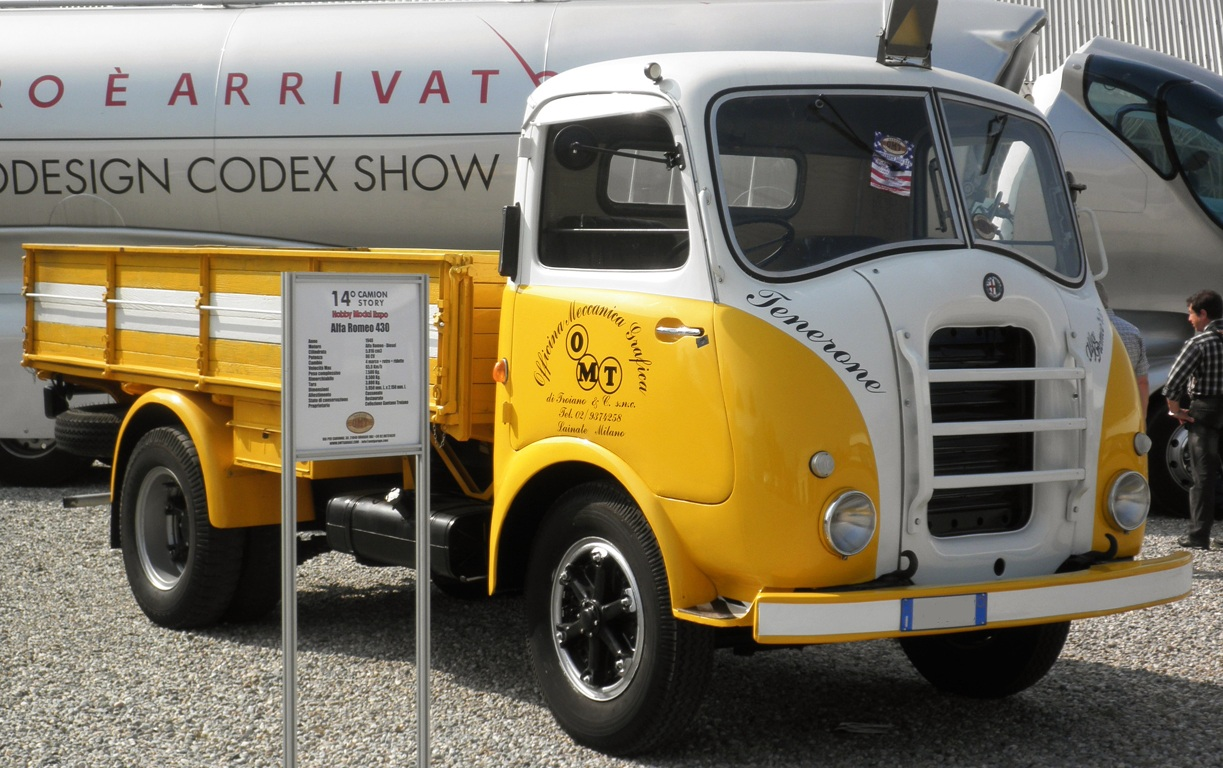

Overview
- Manufacturer: Alfa Romeo
- Production: 1942-1950

Body and chassis
- Class: Commercial vehicle, military vehicle
- Body style: chassis, flatbed truck or truck tractor

Powertrain
- Engine: 5,816 cc 80 hp (60 kW) 4-cylinder diesel
- Transmission: 4-speed transmission with two-speed transfer gearbox

Dimensions
- Length: 5.955 m (234.4 in)
- Width: 2.130 m (83.9 in)
- Height: 2.580 m (101.6 in)
- Kerb weight: 3,350 kg (7,385 lb)

Chronology
- Successor: Alfa Romeo 450

The Alfa Romeo 430 is a 5-ton truck produced by Alfa Romeo between 1942 and 1950. It started as a military project (430RE) based on the larger Alfa Romeo 800 truck. Some of the trucks were converted into anti-aircraft vehicles equipped with a machine-gun of 20 mm (0.8 in) IF Scotti. The truck was produced for a commercial version after the war. Both military and civilian versions were produced until 1950.

The 430 was equipped with 5.8 L straight-4 diesel engine, which could produce 80 hp (60 kW) at 2000 rpm. With that power it could achieve top speed of 65 kilometres per hour (40 mph). Its range was 390 kilometres (240 mi).
