= Alfa Romeo 450 =

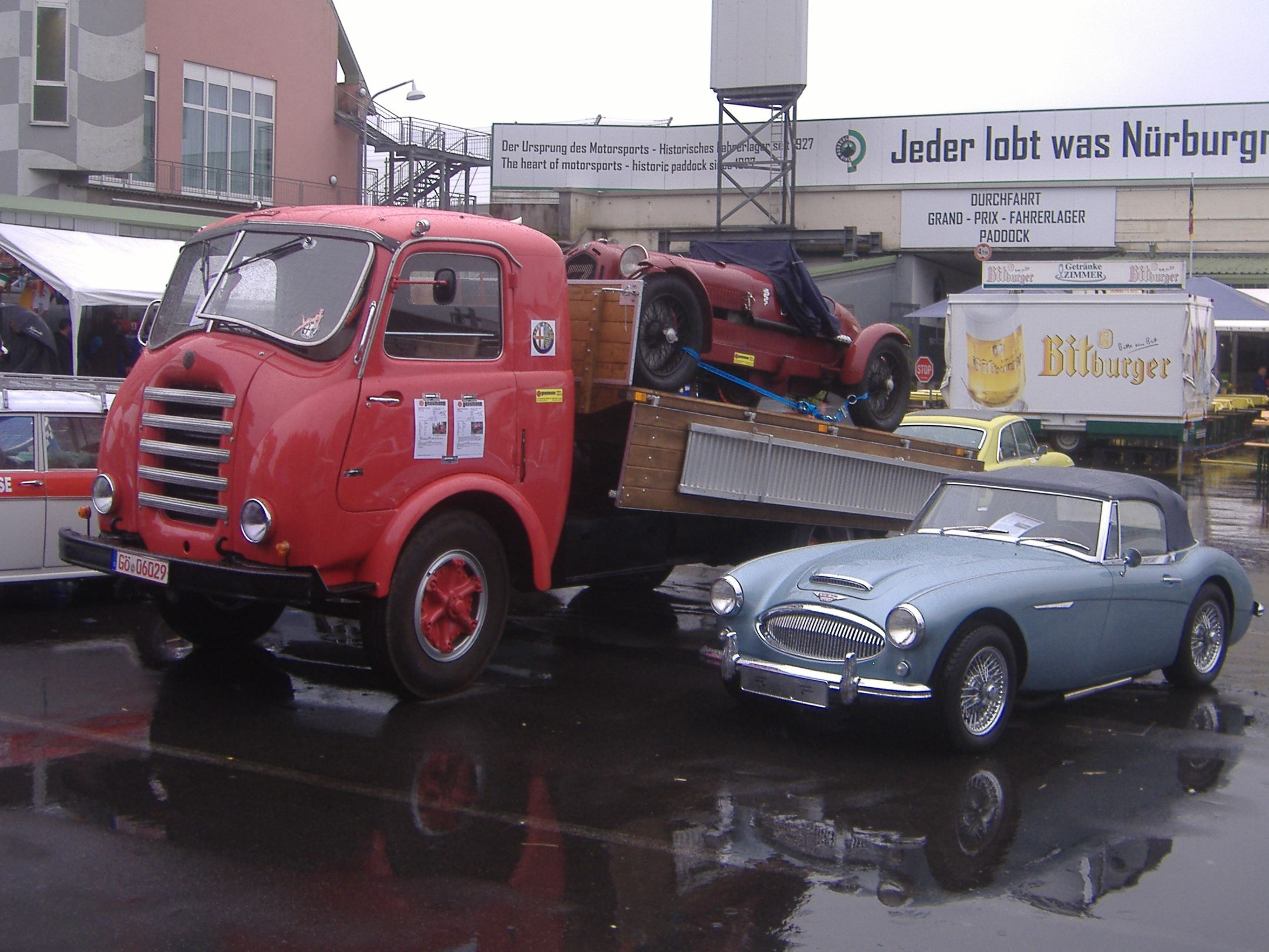
- Alfa Romeo 455 Autotransporter

Overview
- Manufacturer: Alfa Romeo
- Production: 1947-1959

Chronology
- Predecessor: Alfa Romeo 430

The Alfa Romeo 450 is a truck manufactured by Alfa Romeo from 1947 to 1959. Its upgraded version was called Alfa Romeo 455.

The Alfa Romeo 450 was the successor of Alfa Romeo 430. There were several differences between the two models; the most important difference was the engine, with increased power. The 80 hp of the engine mounted on the 430 ran it to 90 hp. The cockpit was enlarged, and the grille was now marked by five horizontal bars, which replaced three in the 430. In 1959 the Alfa Romeo 450 was updated, and the new truck was renamed Alfa Romeo 455, which was produced until the early sixties.

It was also available in all-wheel drive and during the years when it was sold, the bodies, which were based on the chassis of the 450/455, were the subject of aftermarketing.
