= Alfa Romeo Mille (truck) =

Overview
- Type: Heavy commercial vehicle
- Manufacturer: Alfa Romeo
- Also called: Alfa Romeo 1000; FNM 180
- Production: 1958–1964

Body and chassis
- Body style: Lorry; Tractor unit
- Layout: Front-engine, rear-wheel-drive

Powertrain
- Engine: 11 L I6 (diesel)
- Transmission: 8-speed manual

Chronology
- Predecessor: Alfa Romeo 950

The Alfa Romeo Mille is an eight-ton forward control lorry produced by Alfa Romeo between 1958 and 1964. It was the last Alfa Romeo heavy commercial vehicle.

The model was fitted with a 11,050 cc (674 cu in) inline-six diesel engine, which produced between 163–174 hp (122–130 kW), and a gearbox with eight forward speeds. For the time, Alfa Romeo Mille was one of the most innovative trucks. Alfa Romeo built the Mille in a rear-wheel drive 4x2 configuration. The Mille could carry eight metric tons of cargo in the bed and a tow up to 18 tons; a fifth wheel tractor unit version was also made, rated for a 26.2 ton towing capacity. Independent firms offered conversion to three or four axles by adding one or two dead axles, steerable or fixed; maximum bed payload went up respectively to over 10 or 13 tons. Italian Bartoletti made a car transporter version of the Mille in 1963, which could carry up to eight cars on two levels of the car and trailer. There was also special Mille "Motori Aviazione" made for transportation of aircraft engines made by Alfa Romeo.

In 1956, production license of the Mille was acquired by the Brazilian company Fábrica Nacional de Motores. FNM continued production these trucks under its own brand until 1980 with the name FNM 180 series.
