= Renault Maxity =

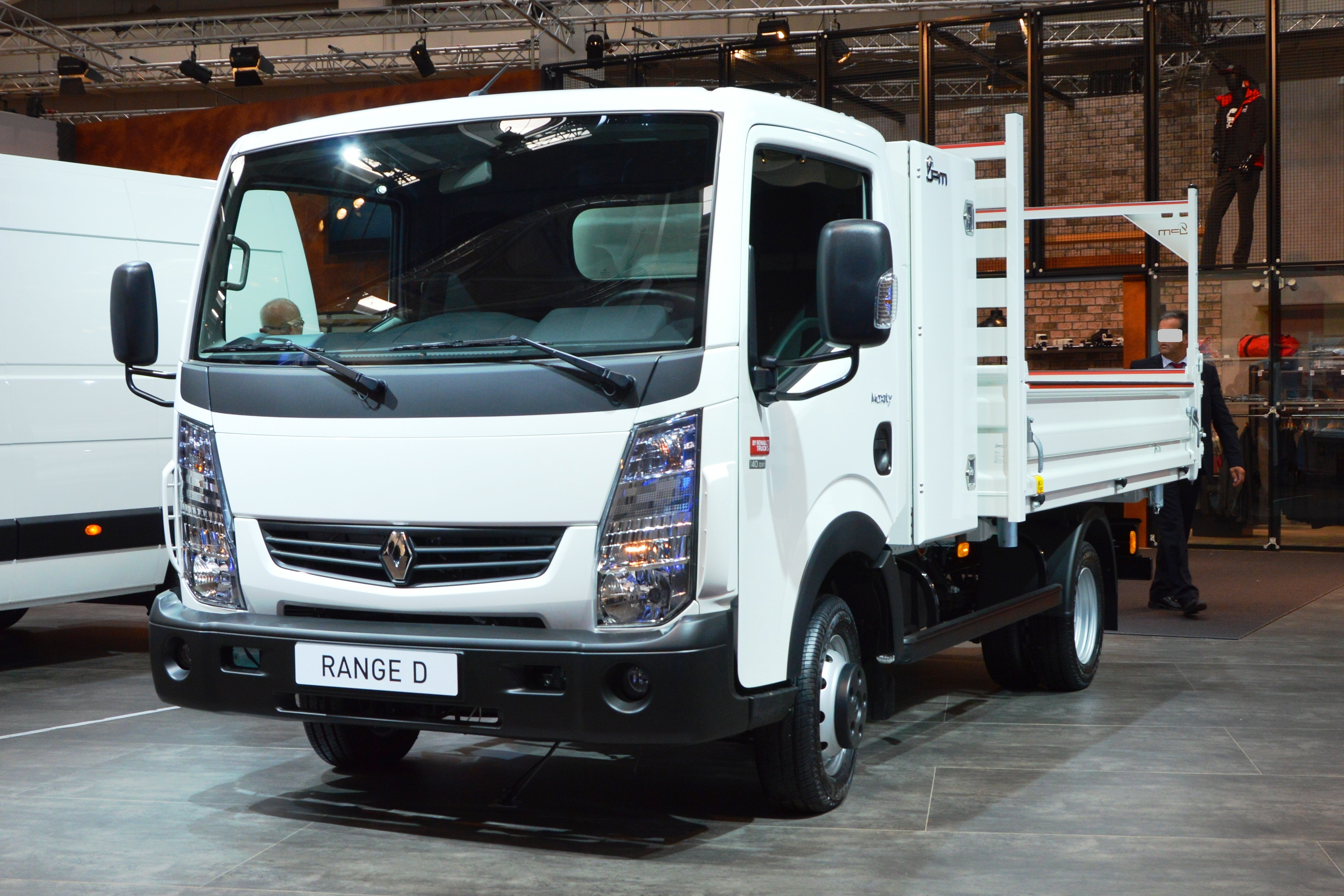

Overview
- Manufacturer: Renault
- Production: 2007-2019
- Assembly: Spain: Ávila

Body and chassis
- Class: Truck
- Body style: Truck (standard cab)
- Related: Nissan Cabstar; Nissan Atlas

Powertrain
- Engine: Diesel; 2.5 I4; 3.0 I4
- Transmission: 5-speed manual 6-speed manual

Dimensions
- Wheelbase: 2,650 to 4,960 mm (104.3 to 195.3 in)
- Width: 1,870 mm (73.6 in)

Chronology
- Predecessor: Renault Mascott

The Renault Maxity is a light commercial vehicle with a cab-over-engine style truck launched by the French manufacturer Renault Trucks in 2007. The Maxity is nearly identical to the Nissan Cabstar, sharing the same drive-train and engine options and manufactured on the same Nissan owned production line in Ávila, Spain. While the sharing of engines and production facilities is part of the Renault-Nissan Alliance, the vehicle is sold by Renault Trucks which is owned by Volvo.

== Specifications ==
In Europe the Maxity is available from 2.8 to 4.5-tonne versions, but only as a 3.4 or 3.5-tonner in Britain. The Maxity is rear-wheel drive and powered with a choice of two diesel engines; a 2.5 L DXi2.5 in 110 bhp (82 kW; 112 PS) and 130 bhp (97 kW; 132 PS) states of tune, and a 3.0 L DXi3 turbo producing 150 bhp (112 kW; 152 PS). All are mated to a five-speed or six-speed manual transmission depending on specification.

In 2010, Renault Trucks trialled an electric version with a 2-tonne payload in Paris with drinks distributor Tafanel. The prototype truck was developed in collaboration with electric commercial vehicle manufacturer PVI.

The compact dimensions of the Maxity are promoted by Renault Trucks to emphasise the use in towns and cities, with a cab width of 1,870 mm (73.6 in), wheelbases ranging from 2,650 to 4,960 mm (104.3 to 195.3 in) depending on configuration, and a compact turning radius of 4.8 m (189.0 in).
