= Renault Trucks K =

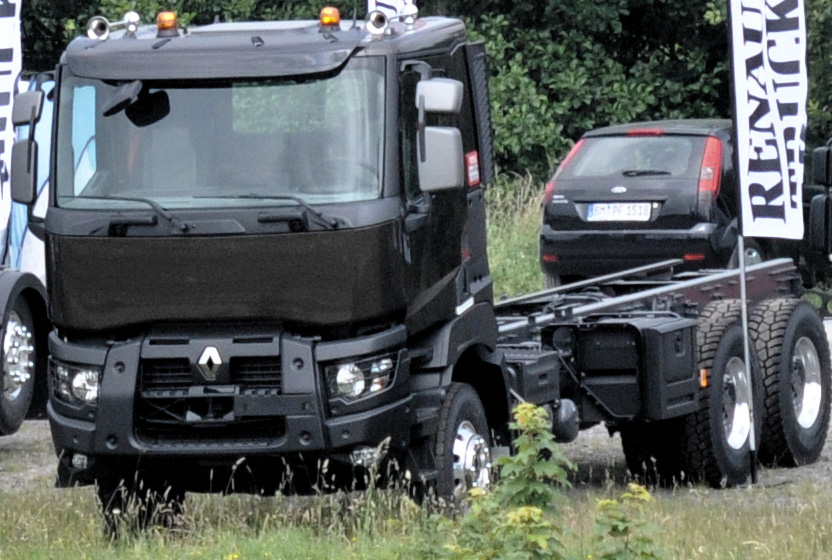

Overview
- Manufacturer: Renault Trucks
- Production: 2013–present
- Assembly: Bourg-en-Bresse, France

Body and chassis
- Class: Heavy truck
- Body style: COE: Day Cab; Night & Day Cab; Sleeper Cab

Powertrain
- Engine: Straight-six engine: DTI 11 (11 L); DTI 13 (13 L)
- Transmission: Manual/automatic

Chronology
- Predecessor: Renault Kerax

The Renault Trucks K is a range of heavy-duty trucks for construction introduced in 2013 by the French truckmaker Renault Trucks.

== Characteristics ==
The Renault Trucks K incorporates an all-wheel drive system as well as security and comfort improvements. The maximum gross combined weight is 120 tonnes.

=== Engines ===
The K offers two Euro 6 six-cylinder engines, the 11 L DTI 11 (with a power output of 380, 430 and 460hp) and the 13 L DTI 13 (440, 480 and 520hp).
