= Alfa Romeo 500 =

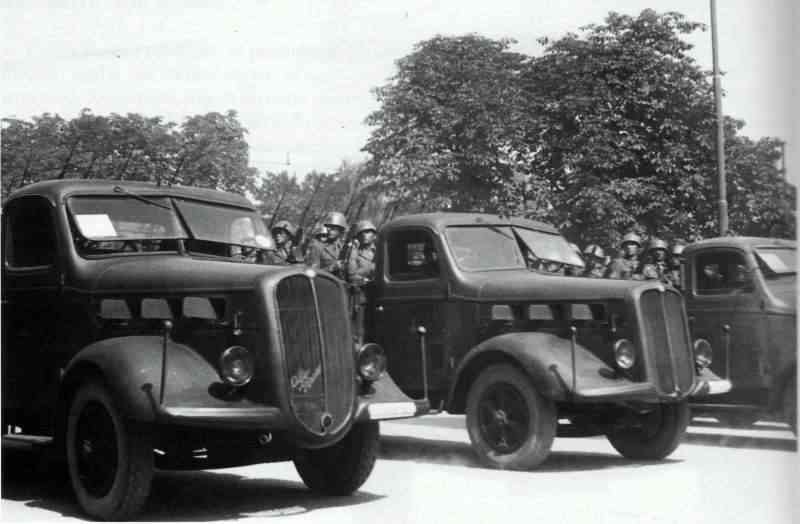
- Alfa Romeo 500 military version during a parade in Turin, August 8, 1939.

Overview
- Manufacturer: Alfa Romeo
- Production: 1937-1945

Body and chassis
- Class: Commercial vehicle, military vehicle

Powertrain
- Engine: 6-cyl diesel engine 6100 cc 75 hp (56 kW)

Dimensions
- Length: 7.02 m (276 in)
- Width: 2.20 m (87 in)
- Height: 2.25 m (89 in)
- Kerb weight: 3,800 kg (8,378 lb)

Chronology
- Predecessor: Alfa Romeo 350

The Alfa Romeo 500 is a 3 tonne class truck, produced by Alfa Romeo from 1937 to 1945. The range included a diesel-powered (Deutz type F6M 313) 75 hp (56 kW) version 500RE, petrol version 500B and gas version 500BR.

The 500 was characterized by having an aerodynamic shape, which was improved over the years during production. The 500 model was the last conventional truck produced by Alfa Romeo, after which the company concentrated on producing cabover trucks.

The Alfa Romeo 500 was used by the Royal Italian Army during World War II under the heading of "500 DR." It was used in the campaign in Russia and the armored version was used in the Balkan campaign. The frame of the model was also used as basis for military buses. The Army version had a top speed of 45 km/h (28 mph), and was able to exceed a maximum gradient of 27% and had a range of 400 kilometres (250 mi) with a full tank (about 100 L).

From 1937 to 1940 Alfa Romeo 500 was also used by the Italian Fire Department as a fire engine or truck. The 500 was also used by Alfa Romeo and Scuderia Ferrari as a racing car transporter for both grand prix racers and Formula 1 cars. Viberti and Bergomi made various bus versions using 500 platform as basis.

== Alfa Romeo 500 range ==
- Alfa 500 base, 1937–38, 4x2 truck, diesel engine, manufactured 1.481 units
- Alfa 500 G, gas engine
- Alfa 500 RM, reinforced chassis and gas methane
- Alfa 500 RB, reinforced chassis and petrol engine
- Alfa 500 AL, bus chassis, diesel engine
- Alfa 500 RE, military version manufactured between 1943 and 1944 357 units, petrol engine

=== Technical specifications ===
Type	Length (mm)	Wheelbase	Width	Height	Empty weight	Payload	Engine	Fuel type	Displacement cc	Power (PS at rpm)	Max speed
Alfa 500	7,148 mm (281.4 in)	4,500 mm (177.2 in)	2,200 mm (86.6 in)	2,246 mm (88.4 in)	3,750 kg (8,267 lb)	4,250 kg (9,370 lb)	AR F6M 313; 6 cylinders	Diesel	6,126 cc (373.8 cu in)	75 PS (74 hp; 55 kW) 2000	56 km/h (35 mph)
Alfa 500 G	7,148 mm (281.4 in)	4,500 mm (177.2 in)	2,200 mm (86.6 in)	2,246 mm (88.4 in)	4,000 kg (8,818 lb)	4,000 kg (8,818 lb)	AR BG; 6 cylinders	Gas	6,700 cc (410 cu in)	70 PS (69 hp; 51 kW) 2250	64 km/h (40 mph)
Alfa 500 RM	7,270 mm (286.2 in)	4,500 mm (177.2 in)	2,200 mm (86.6 in)	2,246 mm (88.4 in)	5,640 kg (12,434 lb)	3,040 kg (6,702 lb)	AR BG6M; 6 cylinders	Petrol	6,126 cc (373.8 cu in)	80 PS (79 hp; 59 kW) 2000	45 km/h (28 mph)
Alfa 500 RB	7,148 mm (281.4 in)	4,500 mm (177.2 in)	2,200 mm (86.6 in)	2,246 mm (88.4 in)	4,000 kg (8,818 lb)	4,500 kg (9,921 lb)	AR BG6B; 6 cylinders	Petrol	6,126 cc (373.8 cu in)	90 PS (89 hp; 66 kW) 2000	80 km/h (50 mph)
Alfa 500 AL	8,630 mm (339.8 in)	5,000 mm (196.9 in)	2,400 mm (94.5 in)	2,246 mm (88.4 in)	-	-	AR F6M 313; 6 cylinders	Diesel	6,126 cc (373.8 cu in)	75 PS (74 hp; 55 kW) @ 2000	68 km/h (42 mph)
Alfa 500 RE	7,020 mm (276.4 in)	4,200 mm (165.4 in)	2,069 mm (81.5 in)	2,250 mm (88.6 in)	3,800 kg (8,378 lb)	3,200 kg (7,055 lb)	AR F6M 313; 6 cylinders	Diesel	6,126 cc (373.8 cu in)	75 PS (74 hp; 55 kW) 2000	45 km/h (28 mph)
