= KrAZ-6510 =

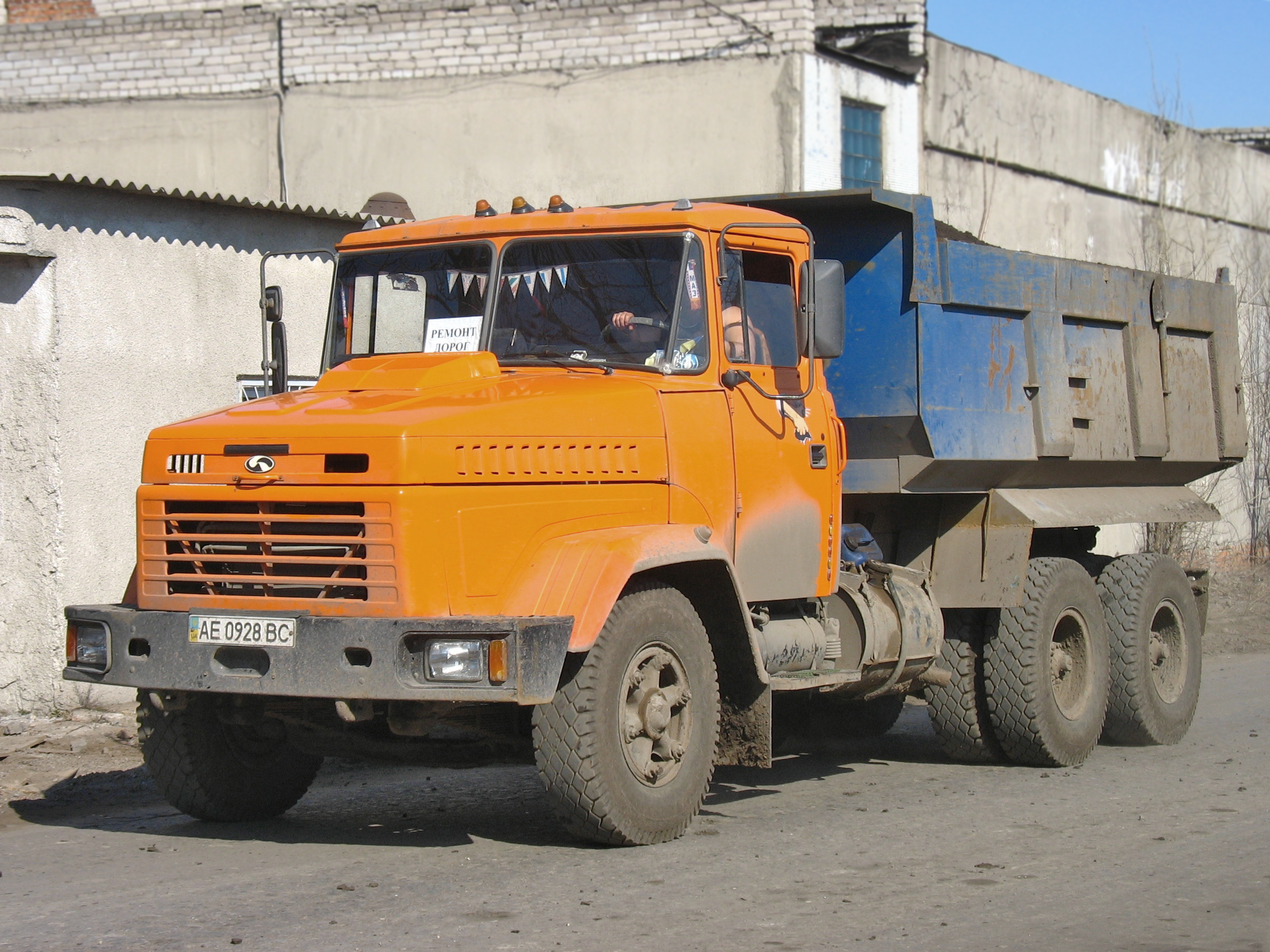

Overview
- Manufacturer: KrAZ
- Production: Since 1992

Body and chassis
- Class: Truck
- Body style: Truck

Chronology
- Predecessor: KrAZ-250

The KrAZ-6510 is a heavy duty truck manufactured at the KrAZ factory in Kremenchuk. It is the successor to the KrAZ-250.

== History ==
The development of the KrAZ-6510 quarry dump truck began in the 1980s. The vehicle was a further development and modernization of the KrAZ-250 model. The technical characteristics are largely similar to the previous model. The production of the KrAZ-6510 model began in 1992. In 1994, KrAZ-6510 dump trucks accounted for half of the vehicles manufactured by KrAZ. In 1995, a KrAZ-6510 dump truck with an imported Cummins diesel engine was manufactured.

In May 2006, due to Ukraine's transition to the international Euro-2 environmental standards, KrAZ decided to stop production of KrAZ-6510 dump trucks for customers in Ukraine and on 1 January 2007, sales of KrAZ-6510 in Ukraine were stopped. However, the plant announced the possibility of continuing their production for export if there were orders from foreign customers.

In 2008, 16 KrAZ-6510-052 dump trucks (with a platform volume of 8.5 m^{3}) were delivered to the Ministry of Defence of Ukraine, another batch of KrAZ-6510 dump trucks (with a platform volume of 10 m^{3}) was manufactured for the Ministry of Construction of Cuba.

== Gallery ==
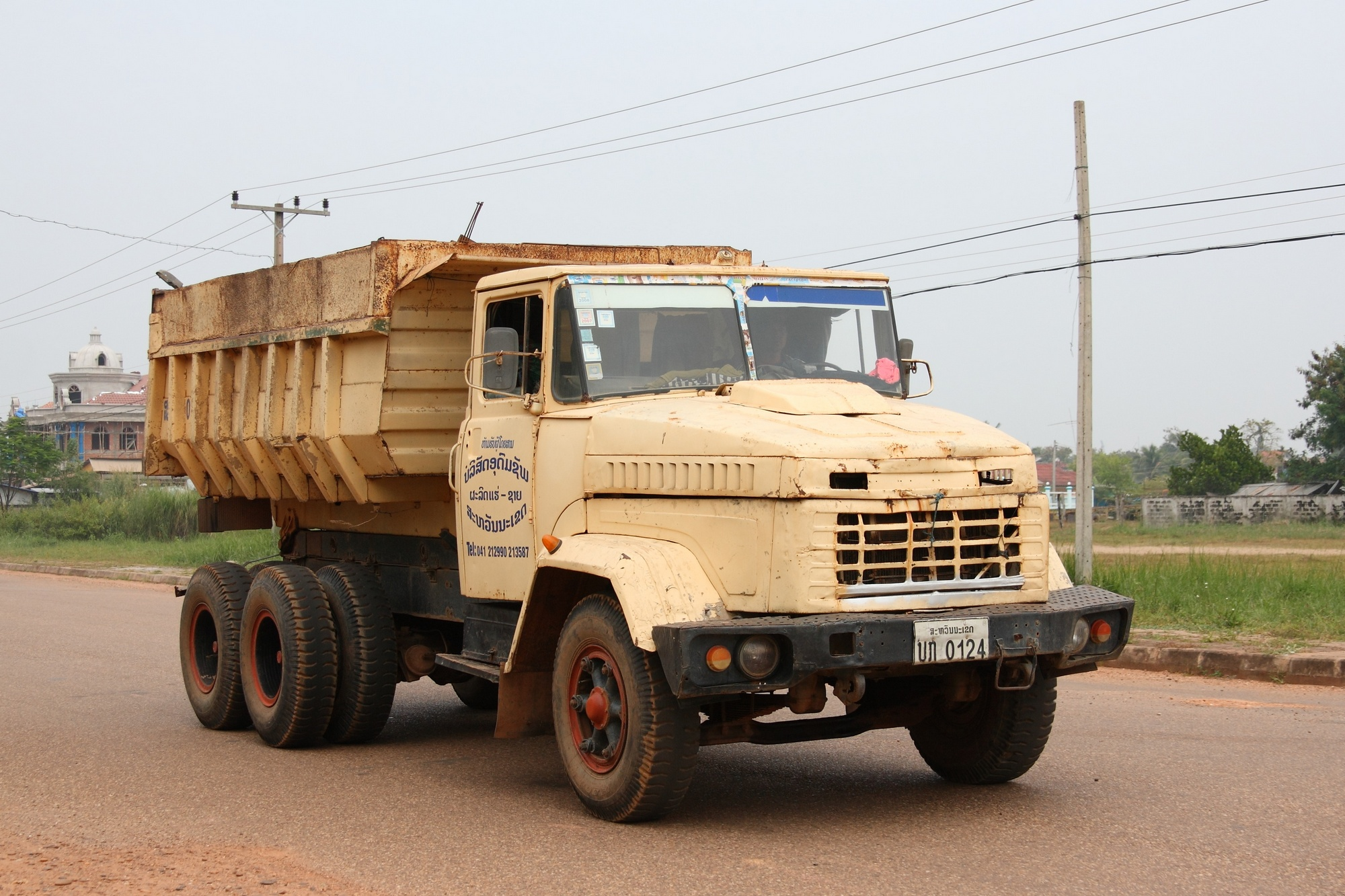
KrAZ-6510 in Laos

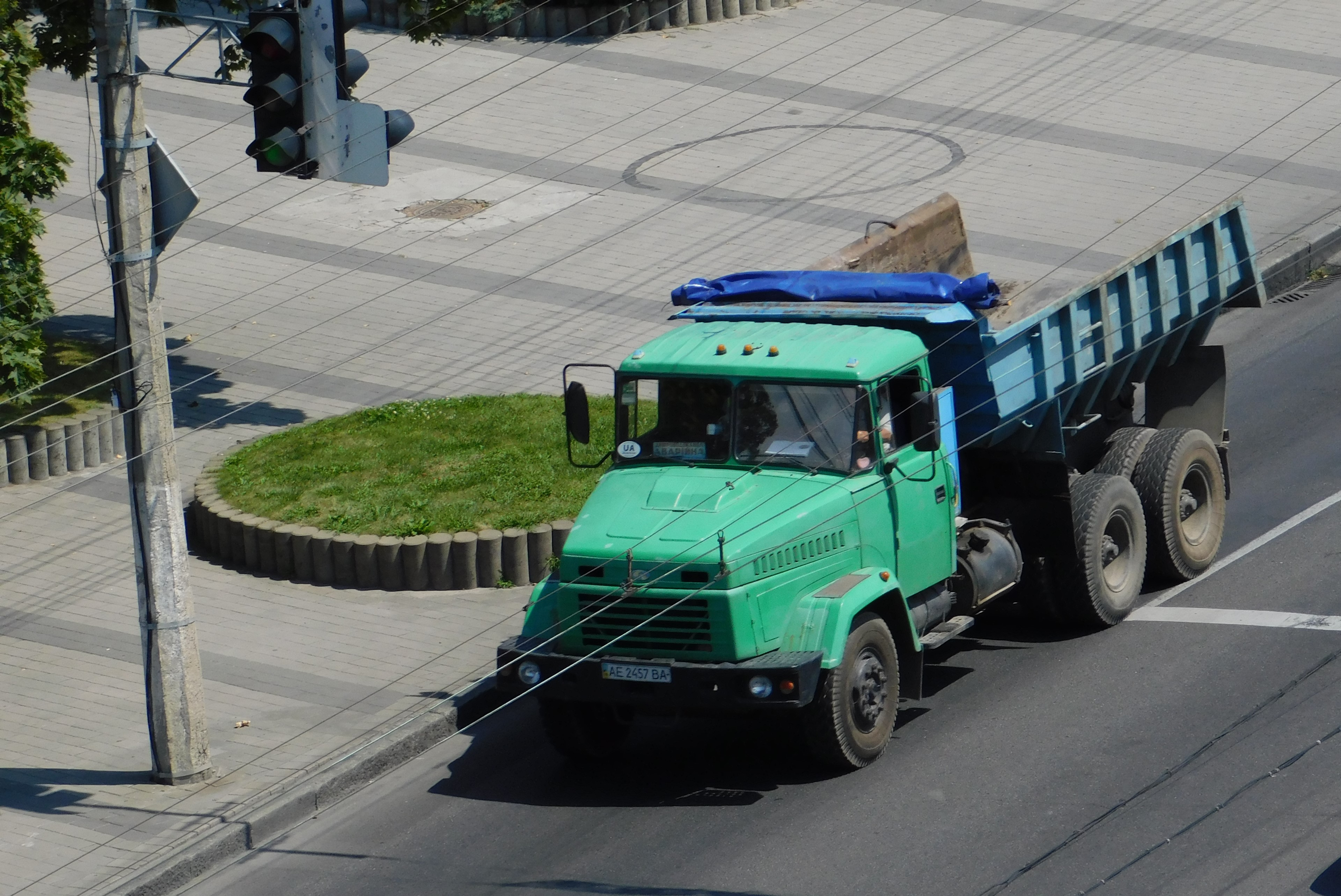
KrAZ-6510 Classic

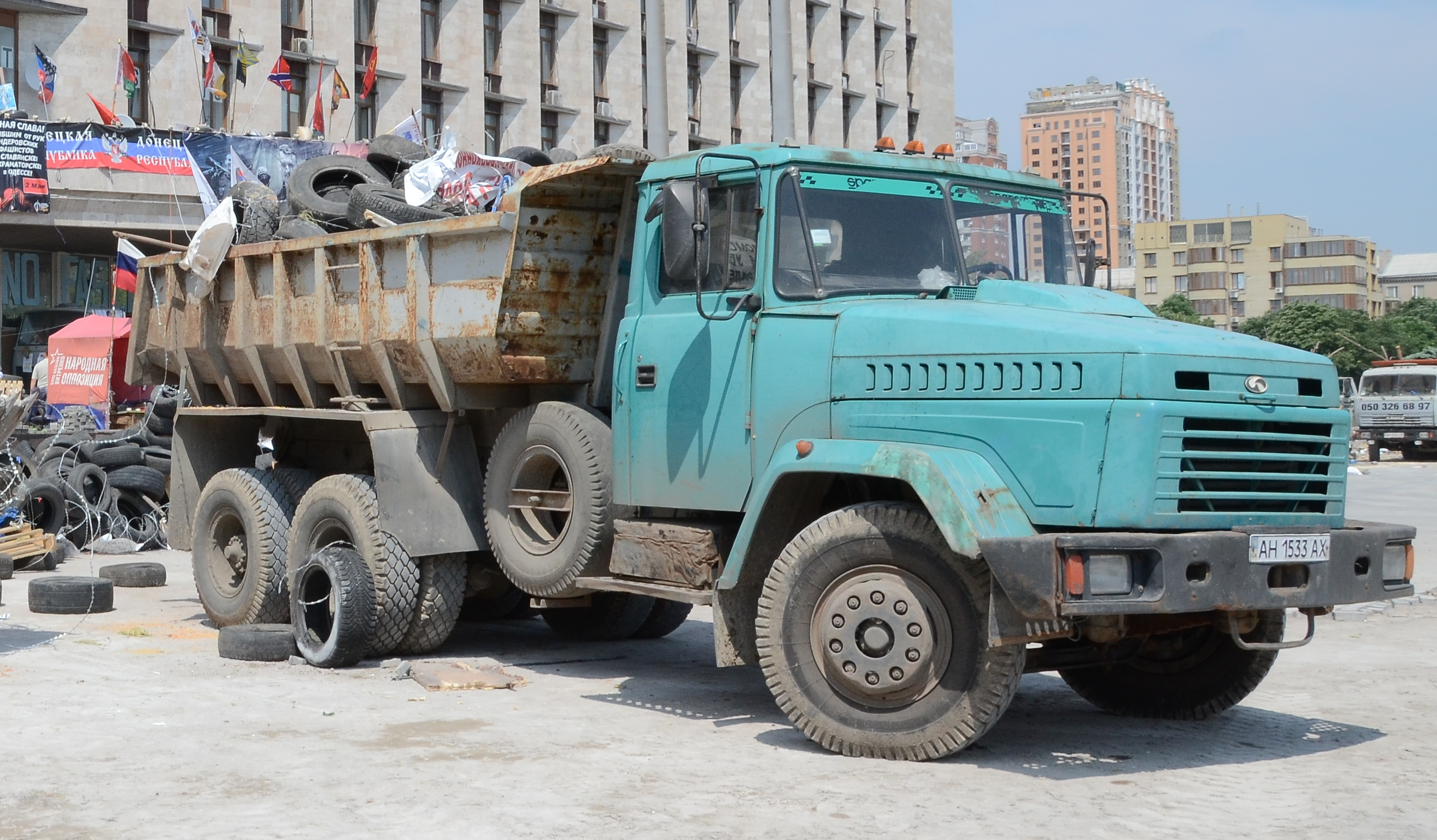
KrAZ-6510 Classic

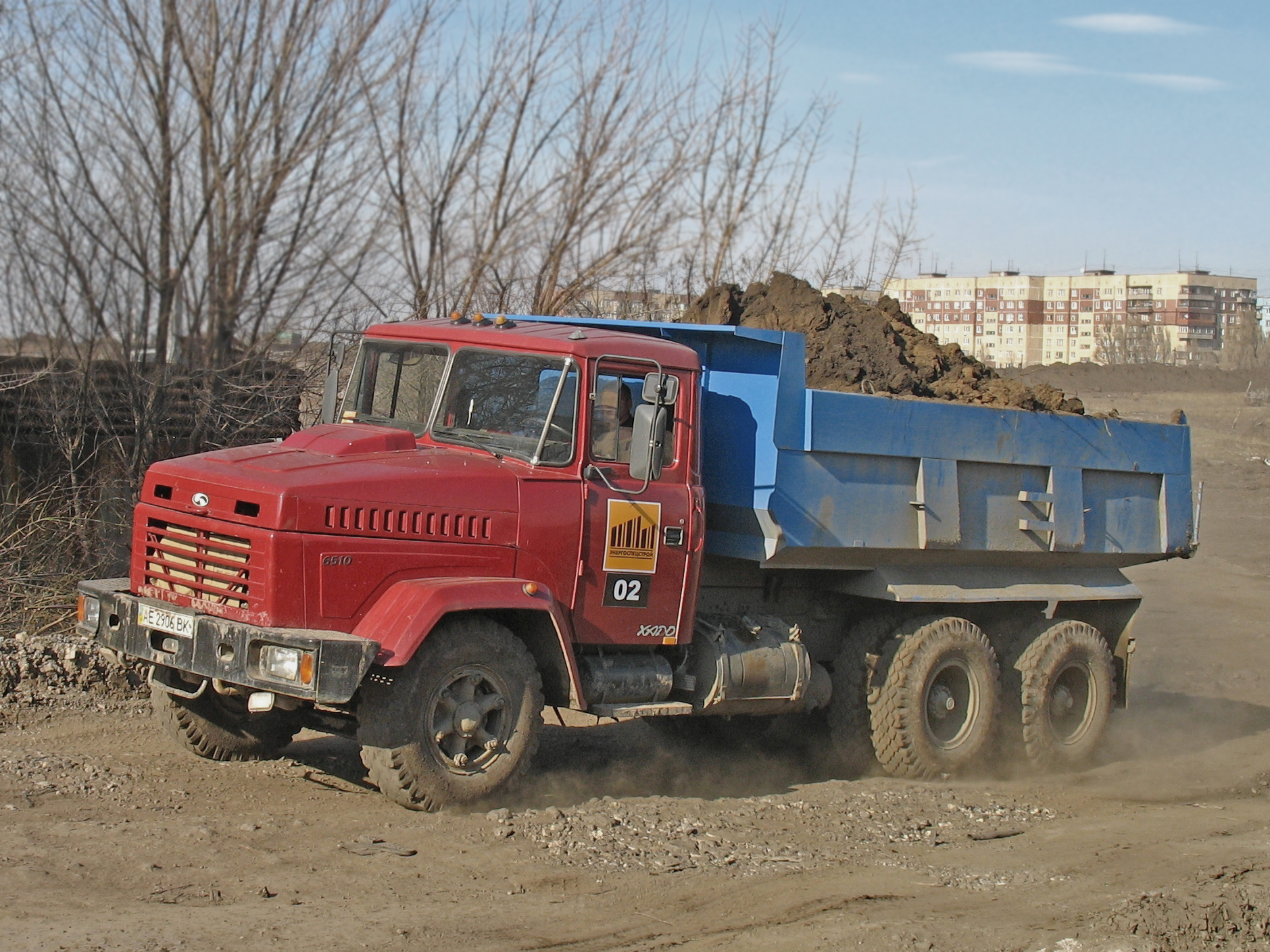
KrAZ-6510-030

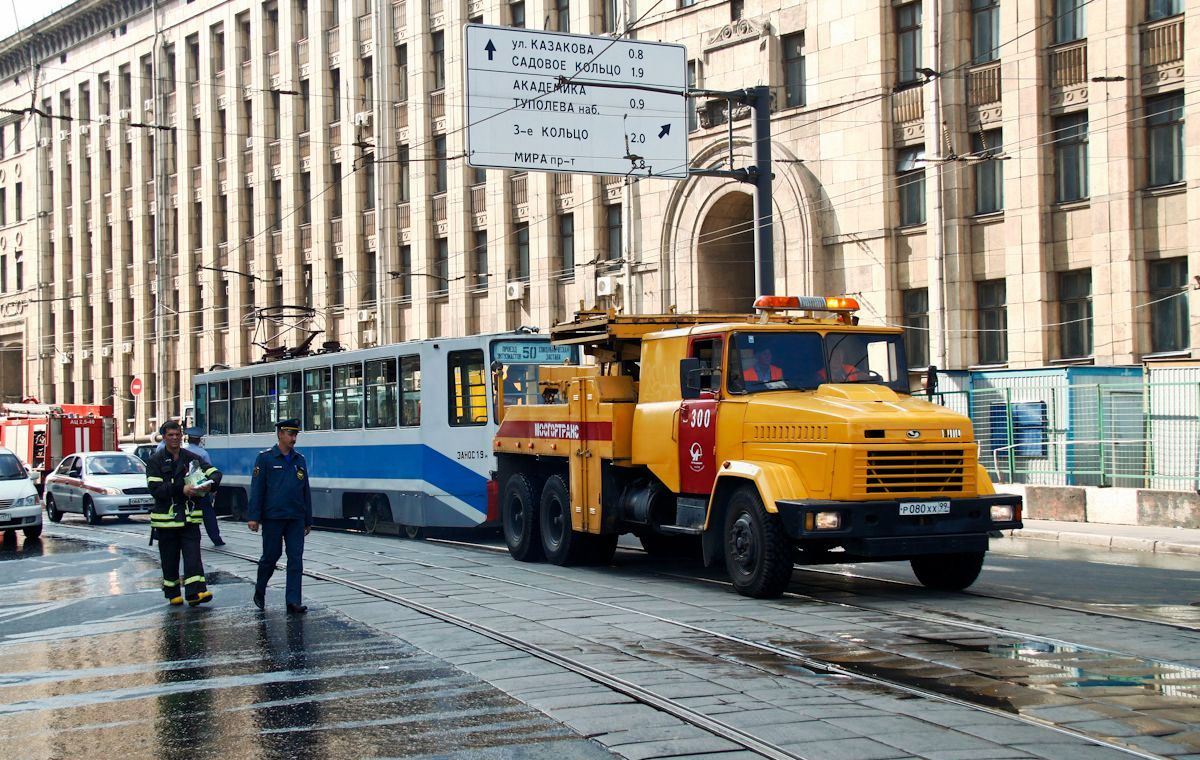
KrAZ-65101

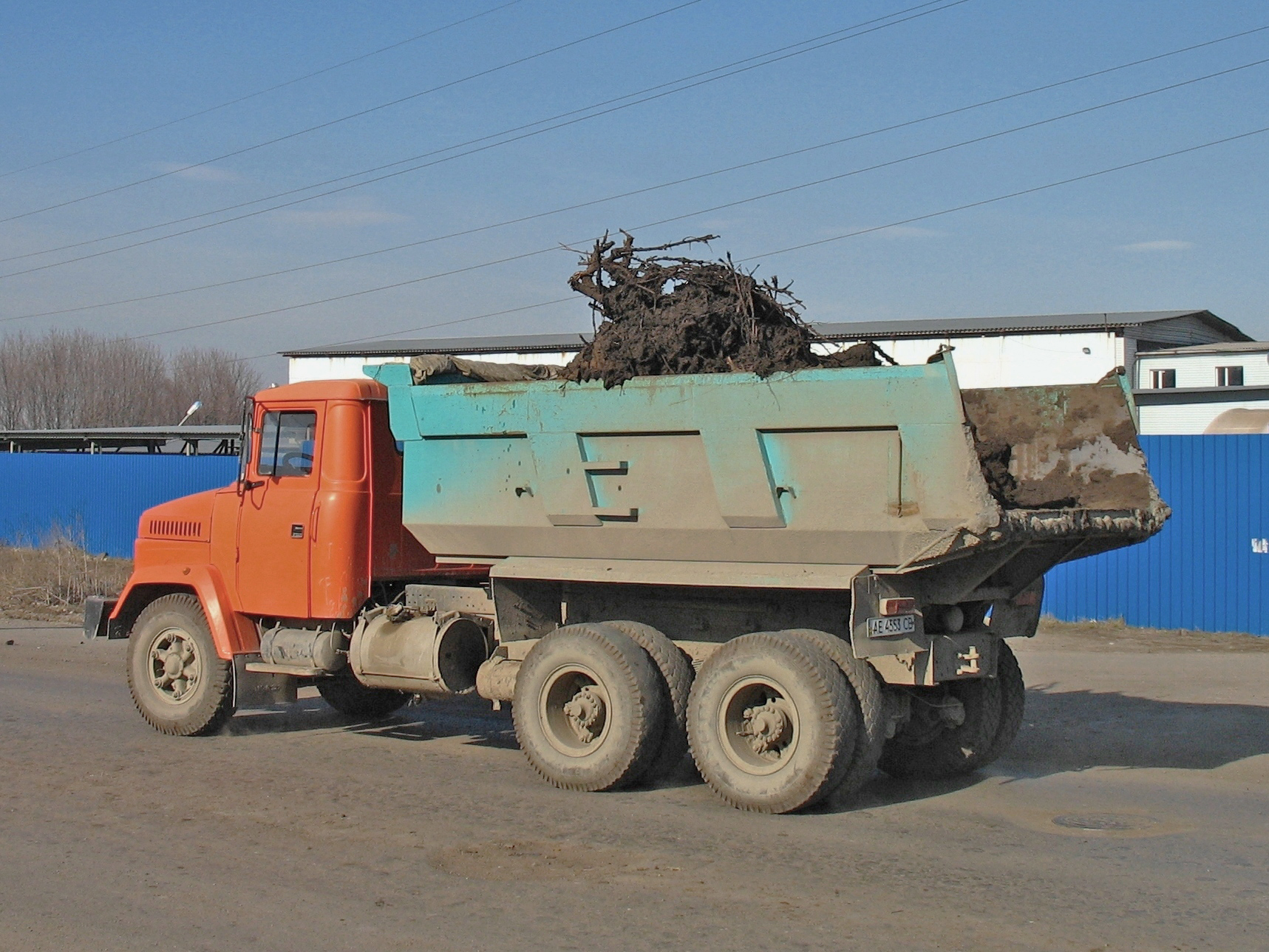
KrAZ-6510-030

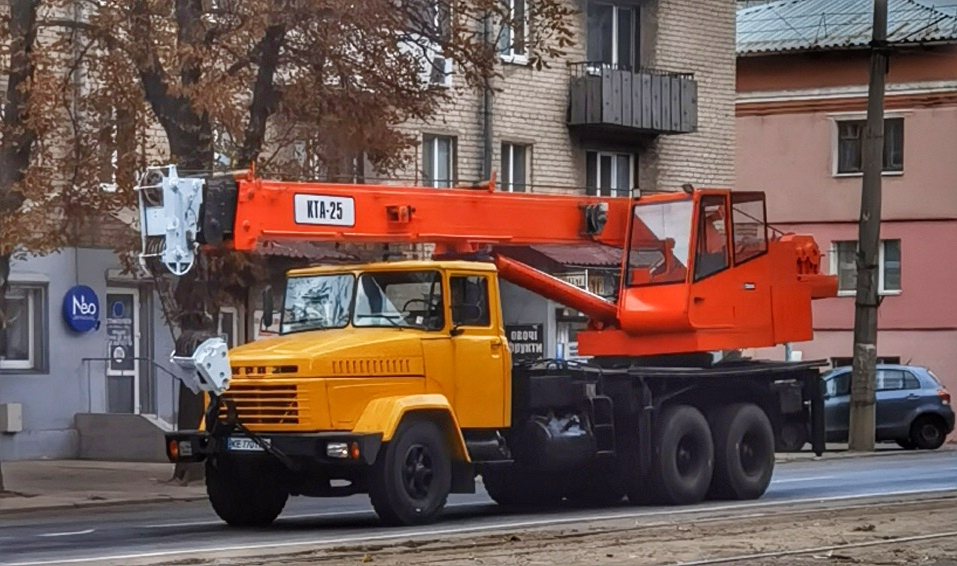
Crane KTA-25 on chassis of KrAZ-65101
