= Renault Kerax =

French truck

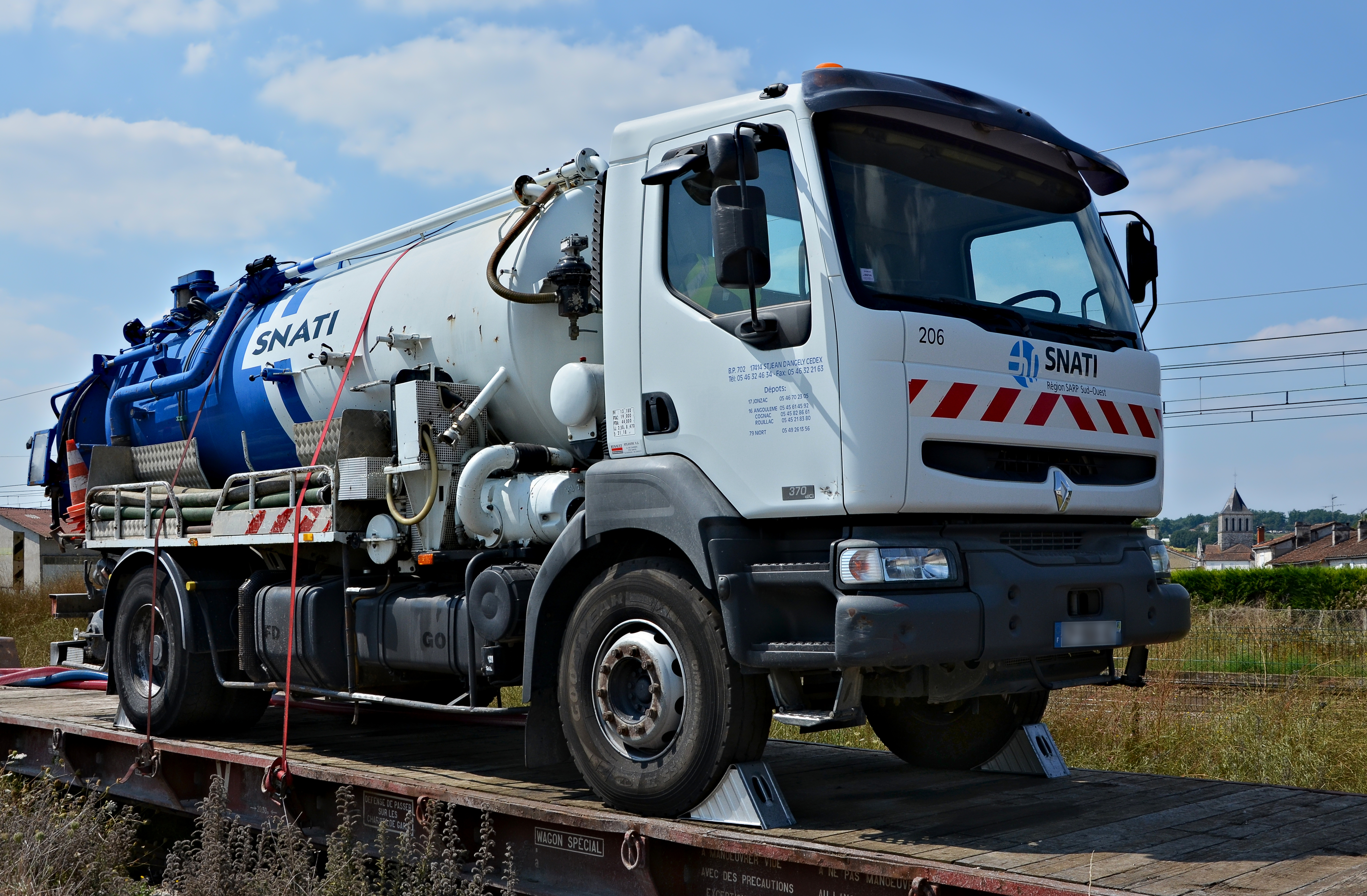
Renault Kerax

The Renault Kerax is a medium- and heavy-duty truck manufactured by Renault Trucks, aimed at the construction industry, and is available as a rigid body or tractor configuration. It was launched in 1997, and underwent a full upgrade in 2006. Production of the Kerax ended in 2013, And 2019, when it was replaced by the C and K range which are powered by Euro VI engines. Military versions, however, are still available.

== Specifications ==
Since 2009 the Kerax is powered by the DXi11 11.1 L 6-cylinder diesel engine which is Euro V compliant, and available in three tuning configurations: 380 bhp (283 kW; 385 PS)/1,800 N⋅m (1,328 lb⋅ft), 430 bhp (321 kW; 436 PS)/2,040 N⋅m (1,505 lb⋅ft) and 460 bhp (343 kW; 466 PS)/2,200 N⋅m (1,623 lb⋅ft). There is a choice between a 16-speed manual gearbox, or an automated 12-speed gearbox.

Prior to 2009, the Kerax was powered by Euro III DXi11 10.8 L engines producing 330 bhp (246 kW; 335 PS)/1,650 N⋅m (1,217 lb⋅ft), 380 bhp (283 kW; 385 PS)/1,850 N⋅m (1,364 lb⋅ft) and 440 bhp (328 kW; 446 PS)/2,000 N⋅m (1,475 lb⋅ft).

Suspension varies depending on model; parabolic on the 26t version, and semi-elliptical for the 32t version. There are three cab options, all of which are 2,300 mm (90.6 in) wide, but their length varies between 1,600 mm (63.0 in) and 2,200 mm (86.6 in) long. The wheelbase can vary between 3,200 mm (126.0 in) and 6,000 mm (236.2 in).

The Kerax is manufactured in the Russian city of Kaluga at the Volvo Trucks factory which opened in 2009.

== Mack Defense Kerax 8x8 ==
Mack Trucks sells a rebadged Kerax as a military logistics and tactical truck. The Canadian Army ordered over 1,500 Kerax trucks from 2017 to 2018. These vehicles replaced the second half of the Medium Support Vehicle System contract originally awarded to Navistar International for the Navistar 7400.

== Dakar Rally ==
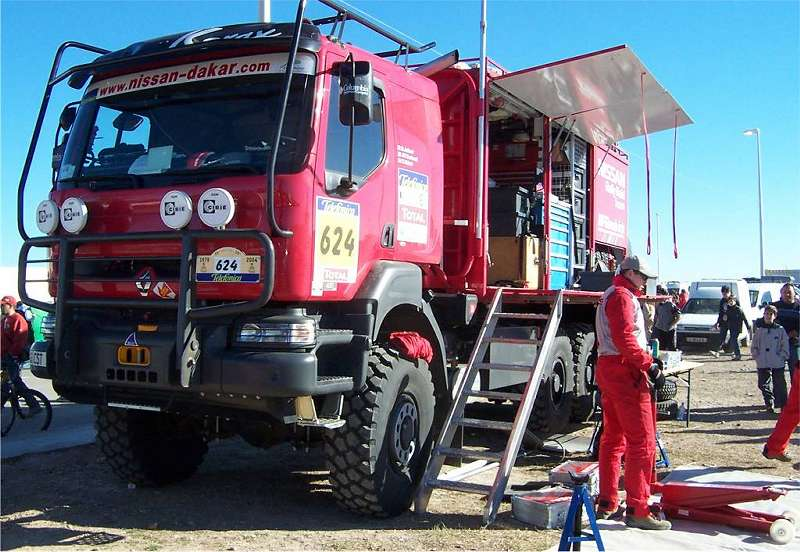
First generation Kerax at the Dakar Rally

The Kerax is often used in the Dakar Rally as a support vehicle.
