= Renault Trucks C =

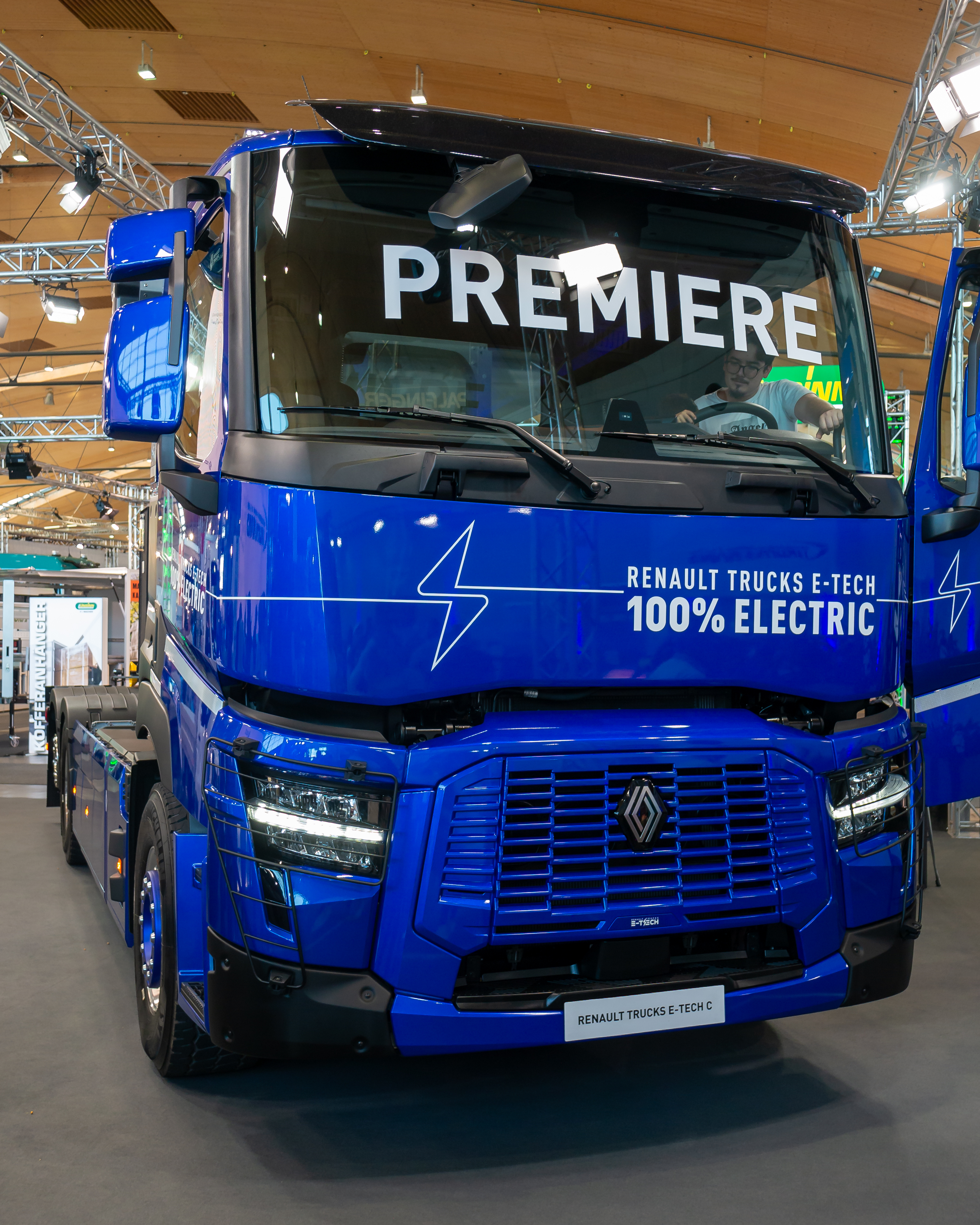
- E-Tech C

Overview
- Manufacturer: Renault Trucks
- Production: 2013–present
- Assembly: Bourg-en-Bresse, France; Shah Alam, Malaysia (CKD)

Body and chassis
- Class: Heavy/medium truck
- Body style: COE: Day Cab; Night & Day Cab; Sleeper Cab

Powertrain
- Engine: 8 L DTI 8 I6 common rail 11 L DTI 11 I6; 13 L DTI 13 I6
- Transmission: Manual/automatic

Chronology
- Predecessor: Renault Kerax

The Renault Trucks C is a range of medium duty/high duty trucks for construction manufactured by the French truckmaker Renault Trucks introduced in 2013.

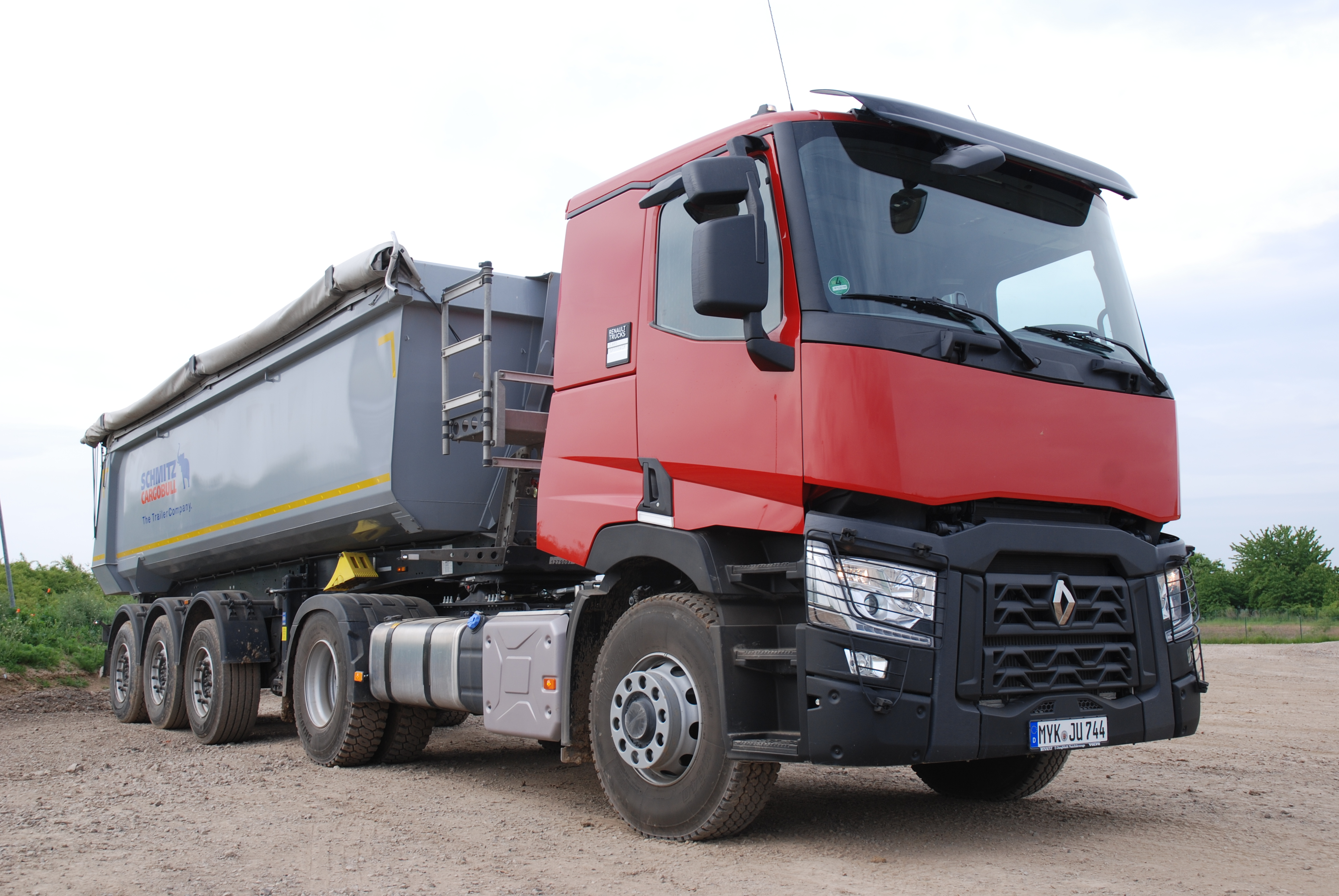
Older model

== Characteristics ==
The Renault Trucks C incorporates a temporary hydrostatic traction system in its front axle (Optitrack). It also adds new comfort and security features.

=== Engines ===
The C offers three Euro 6 engines, the 8 L DTI 8 (with a power output of 250, 280 and 320 hp) the 11 L DTI 11 (380, 430 and 460 hp) and the 13 L DTI 13 (440, 480 and 520 hp).
