= Alfa Romeo 50 =

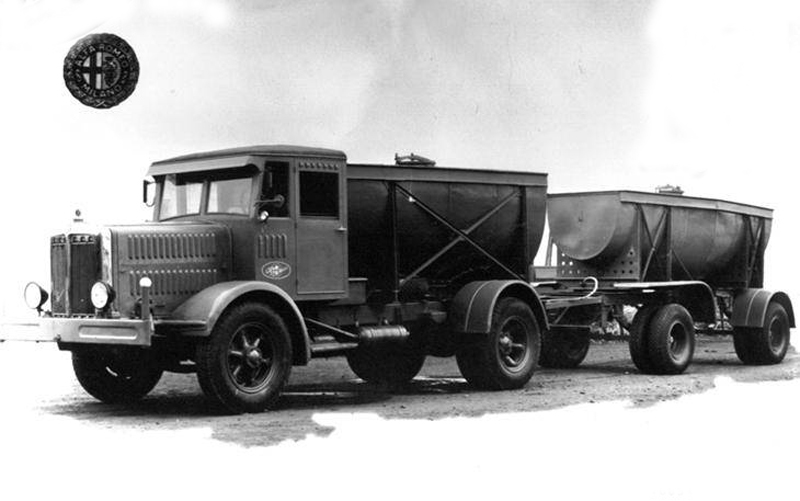

Overview
- Manufacturer: Alfa Romeo
- Production: 1931 - 1934
- Assembly: Portello, Milan, Italy

Body and chassis
- Class: Commercial vehicle

Powertrain
- Engine: 10,600 cc six cylinder diesel

Dimensions
- Wheelbase: 5,200 mm (204.7 in)
- Length: 8,950 mm (352.4 in)
- Width: 2,450 mm (96.5 in)

Chronology
- Successor: Alfa Romeo 800

The Alfa Romeo 50 was an Italian truck produced by Alfa Romeo from 1931 to 1934. The company created the truck in partnership with Büssing. A replacement did not arrived until 1940, with the introduction of the Alfa Romeo 800/900 series of trucks.

== Technical characteristics ==
The truck can draw trailer of 14t in its most common version.

The truck's dimensions were 8.85 m (348 in) long (with trailer), 2.45 m (96 in) wide and 2.50 m (98 in) tall.

The Alfa Romeo 50 had a 10.6 litre, 6 cylinder diesel engine rated 80 hp (60 kW) at 1200 rpm. The maximum speed of the truck is 33 km/h (21 mph).

== Production ==
115 units were produced.
