= Alfa Romeo 350 =

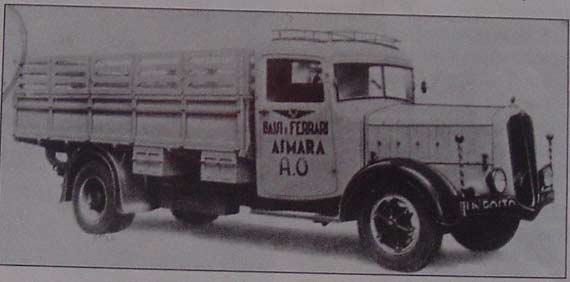

Overview
- Manufacturer: Alfa Romeo
- Production: 1935 - 1937
- Assembly: Portello, Milan, Italy

Body and chassis
- Class: Commercial vehicle

Powertrain
- Engine: 6.1 L diesel

Dimensions
- Length: 6,958 mm (273.9 in)
- Width: 2,060 mm (81.1 in)

Chronology
- Successor: Alfa Romeo 500

Alfa Romeo 350 is a medium Italian truck produced by Alfa Romeo in its Portello Plant. It was made after the 85 and 110 proved to be too heavy and expensive.

== Technical characteristics ==
The 350 was equipped with a 6-cylinder diesel engine Deutz type F6M 313 of 6.1 L displacement that delivered a 75 PS (55 kW; 74 hp) at 2000 rpm, coupled to a manual gearbox with 4 gears plus reverse gear. Had place for 2 people in the cabin.

== History ==
Like the models already in production at Portello, the 350 was also based on German Büssing model, the 275 type: the development began in 1934 and compared to the original version the engine was upgraded and revised chassis and brakes. The production ceased in 1937, with the introduction of the 500, evolution of the 350 studied for the service in Italian East Africa. The 350 was right hand drive model like all trucks built in Italy until 1974.

A total of 701 350 were produced, including the bus version.

== Bibliografia ==
- Stefano Salvetti, L'altra Alfa, Fucina Editore, Milano, 2014, ISBN 978-88-88269-38-2
