= Alfa Romeo 800 =

Italian heavy truck

Alfa Romeo 800 Alfa Romeo 800RE
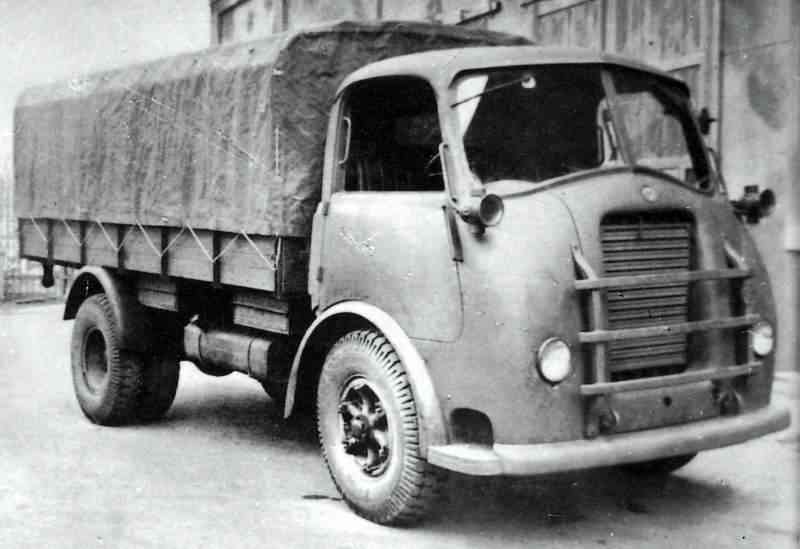

Overview
- Manufacturer: Alfa Romeo
- Production: 1940–1947

Body and chassis
- Class: Commercial vehicle, military vehicle
- Body style: extended cab, sleeper cab

Powertrain
- Engine: 8,725 cc 108 hp (81 kW) 6-cylinder diesel
- Transmission: 4-speed manual

Dimensions
- Length: 6.84 m (269 in)
- Width: 2.35 m (93 in)
- Height: 2.85 m (112 in)
- Kerb weight: 5,500 kg (12,125 lb)

Chronology
- Predecessor: Alfa Romeo 50
- Successor: Alfa Romeo Romeo (after 1954)

The Alfa Romeo 800 is an Italian heavy truck produced by Alfa Romeo between 1940 and 1947. It was first produced as a military version 800RE and after the war as a civilian version. The military version was initially used only in the Italian Army ("Regio Esercito"), mainly in North Africa, Russia and occupied France. The 800 was equipped with an 8.7 L diesel engine and could reach a top speed of 50 kilometres per hour (31 mph). There were also gas generator and gasoline models produced. A half track prototype version a CSEM 800RE (Centro Studi ed Esperienze della Motorizzazione - the Italian Army's vehicle research and development organization) was also made for Italian army. Some of 800RE were also converted to German Army as Maultier, this vehicle had also tracks in rear.

The 800 was replaced by the model 900. All the series was then replaced by the slightly lighter Alfa Romeo Romeo, that served as the company's only commercial vehicle for decades to come.

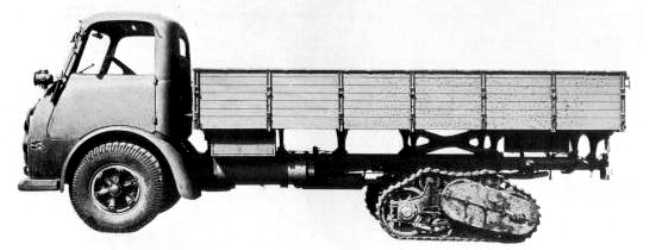
The Alfa Romeo 800RE CSEM (Centro Studi ed Esperienze della Motorizzazione - the Italian Army's vehicle research and development organization)

Alfa Romeo 900

Overview
- Manufacturer: Alfa Romeo
- Production: 1947–1954

Powertrain
- Engine: 9,500 cc 130 PS (96 kW) 6-cylinder diesel
- Transmission: 4-speed manual

== Alfa Romeo 900 ==
The Alfa Romeo 900 is a truck produced by Alfa Romeo from 1947 to 1954. As a line, the model was virtually identical to the Alfa Romeo 800, of which it took its place. The new truck had a 9,500 cc engine with an output of 130 PS (96 kW; 128 hp). The loading capacity was increased to 9 tonnes. A three-axis version was also available.

Alfa Romeo 950

Overview
- Manufacturer: Alfa Romeo
- Production: 1954–1958

Powertrain
- Engine: 9,500 cc 130 PS (96 kW) 6-cylinder diesel
- Transmission: 4-speed manual

== Alfa Romeo 950 ==
By the mid-1950s the Model 900 was updated and became known as the Model 950. The main difference between two models is small windows behind the front doors of the cab. The 950 was produced until 1958, when it was replaced by the entirely-new Mille.
