= List of electric truck makers =

This is a list of electric truck makers that have produced medium- and heavy-duty commercial battery-powered all-electric trucks.

== Multiple-brand corporations ==
The following truck brands are owned by Big Three automobile manufacturers and other corporations which hold multiple automobile and truck brands.

=== Hyundai-Kia ===
In 2020, Hyundai sold over 9,000 units of its Porter Electric truck in South Korea while Kia sold over 5,000 units of the Kia Bongo EV in the same market.

=== Mercedes-Benz Group ===
==== Mercedes-Benz ====
The electric truck family includes model 300 and 400 delivery trucks and model 600 long-haul semi. Series production of the semi started in November 2024 and the first deliveries to German customers were in December. Online retail giant Amazon ordered 200 model 600 tractors for UK and Germany operations.

Mercedes-Benz began delivering eActros units to 10 customers in September 2018 for a two-year real-world test. Customers include Dachser, Edeka, Hermes, Kraftverkehr Nagel, Ludwig Meyer, Pfenning Logistics, TBS Rhein-Neckar and Rigterink of Deutschland, and Camion Transport and Migros of Switzerland. In 2023, the eActros 600 with a 621 kWh battery and a range of 500 km was presented, with production starting in 2024.

==== Daimler AG ====
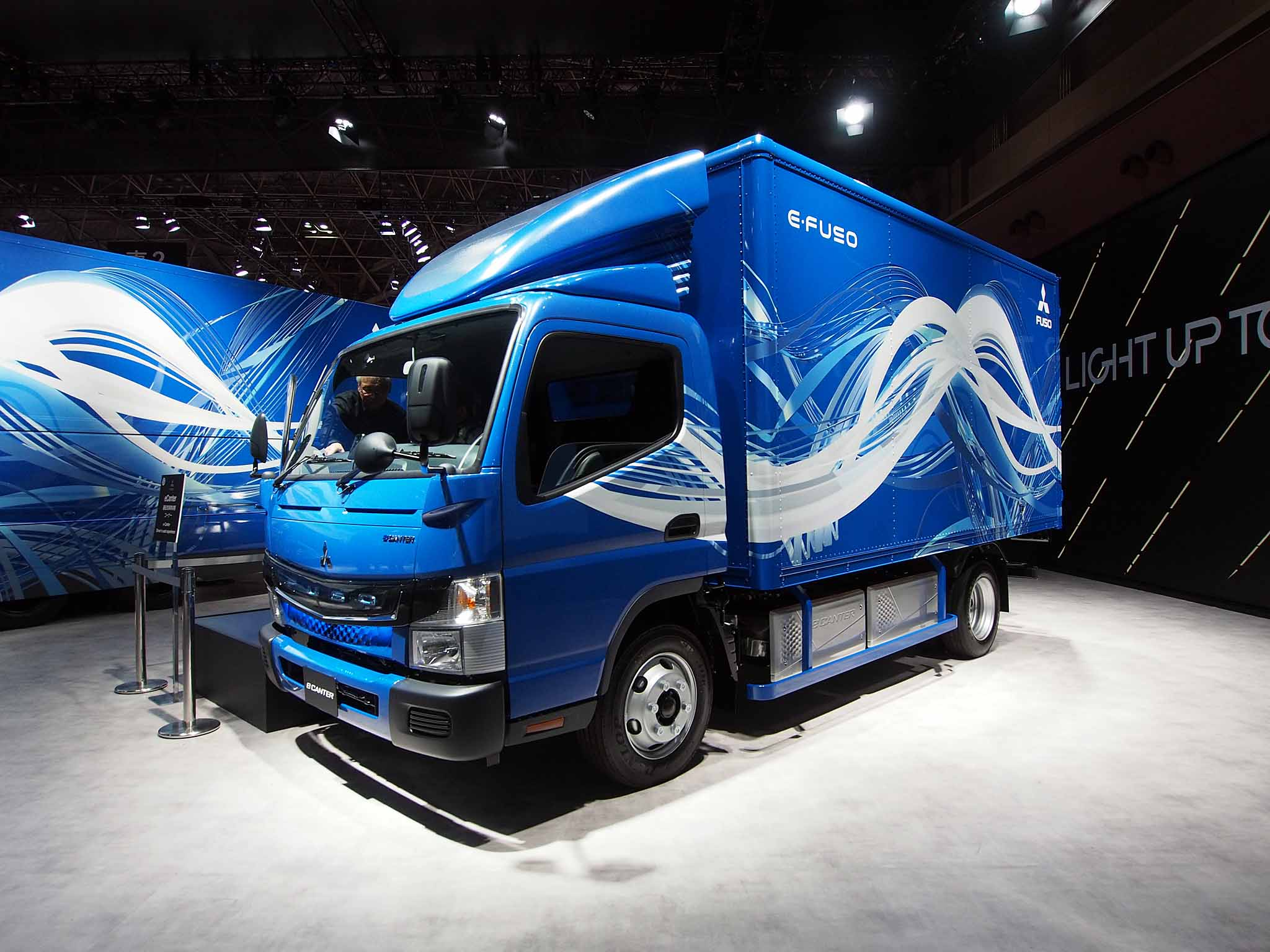
Mitsubishi Fuso eCanter at the Tokyo Motor Show 2017

===== Freightliner =====
Freightliner began delivering e-M2 trucks to Penske in December 2018. Since 2023 Daimler offers MT50e electric step-van with the exact cargo capacity and dimensions as its diesel counterpart. The 2024 model offers level 2 home charging which was absent on the 2023 model.

The eCascadia is an all-electric truck variant of the Cascadia. As of 2022, the specifications of the long-range variant include a range of 230 mi (370 km) (single-drive) or 220 mi (350 km) (tandem-drive), using 438-kWh batteries, and 320–470 hp (240–350 kW), with charging to 80% in 90 minutes. It has a GCWR of up to 82,000 lb (37,000 kg) and will compete with the Tesla Semi.

===== Mitsubishi Fuso =====
The Fuso Ecanter, also stylized as FUSO eCanter, is an electric truck in the class of light commercial vehicles produced by the Mitsubishi Fuso Truck and Bus Corporation.

The Fuso Ecanter, a variant of the Fuso Canter, has a gross vehicle weight of 7.49 tonnes and a payload of 4.5 tons.

The electric motor has a power of 115 kW (154 hp). The light truck was first introduced in 2016 and the first units were delivered in 2017. Daimler initially produced 500 vehicles in 2017 and 2018 and planned to start mass production in 2019.

The Fuso Ecanter will also be sold in North America under the RIZON brand starting in 2023.

===== Rizon =====
Daimler launched the all-electric truck Rizon brand in the United States in 2023. Journalists questioned whether the Rizon trucks are rebranded Mitsubishi Fuso eCanter trucks, but Daimler did not address these questions.

=== Paccar ===
==== DAF ====
DAF delivered its first CF semi-truck to Jumbo for testing in December 2018. It uses a VDL powertrain. The logistics company Tinie Manders Transport received a unit in February 2019, and Contargo in Germany received two units in May.

==== Peterbilt ====
In 2021, Peterbilt commenced production of three all-electric model lines, launching the Class 8 579EV tractor, Class 8 520EV low-cab COE, and the Class 7 220EV COE.

The medium-duty model line underwent a complete redesign, as the 325, 330, 337, and 348 were discontinued. Adopting the larger cab of the 567 and 579, the Class 5-7 Model 535, 536, 537, and 548 also introduced the rebranding of several PACCAR drivetrain and suspension components.

=== Tata ===
Tata Ultra T.7 is India's first fully electric truck. The truck comes with modern design and powertrain of zero emission. It is designed to bear a payload range of 3692–4935 kg. It has a weight of 7490 kg and equipped with 6 wheels. Tata motors also launched an electric version of Tata Ace. It is a small commercial vehicle which is designed to be used in cities. The Ace EV is the first product featuring Tata Motors' EVOGEN powertrain. It is powered by a 27 kW (36 hp) motor with 130 Nm of peak torque, cargo volume of 208 ft^3 and gradeability of 22%.

=== Toyota ===
==== Hino ====
Hino Motors partnered with SEA Electric to provide Hino electric trucks using the SEA-Drive powertrain. The trucks are scheduled to become available in 2024 in the United States. SEA Electric has been installing its electric powertrains in medium and heavy-duty trucks and buses since 2017.

=== Volkswagen AG ===
==== MAN ====
MAN began delivering a dozen units of various e-TGM trucks in September 2018 for testing purposes with different customers. Serial production was scheduled to begin in 2022.

=== Volvo AB ===
==== Mack ====
Mack unveiled the LR refuse truck in May 2019. Its commercialization should begin in 2019. New York City Department of Sanitation will test one unit beginning in 2020.

==== Renault Trucks ====
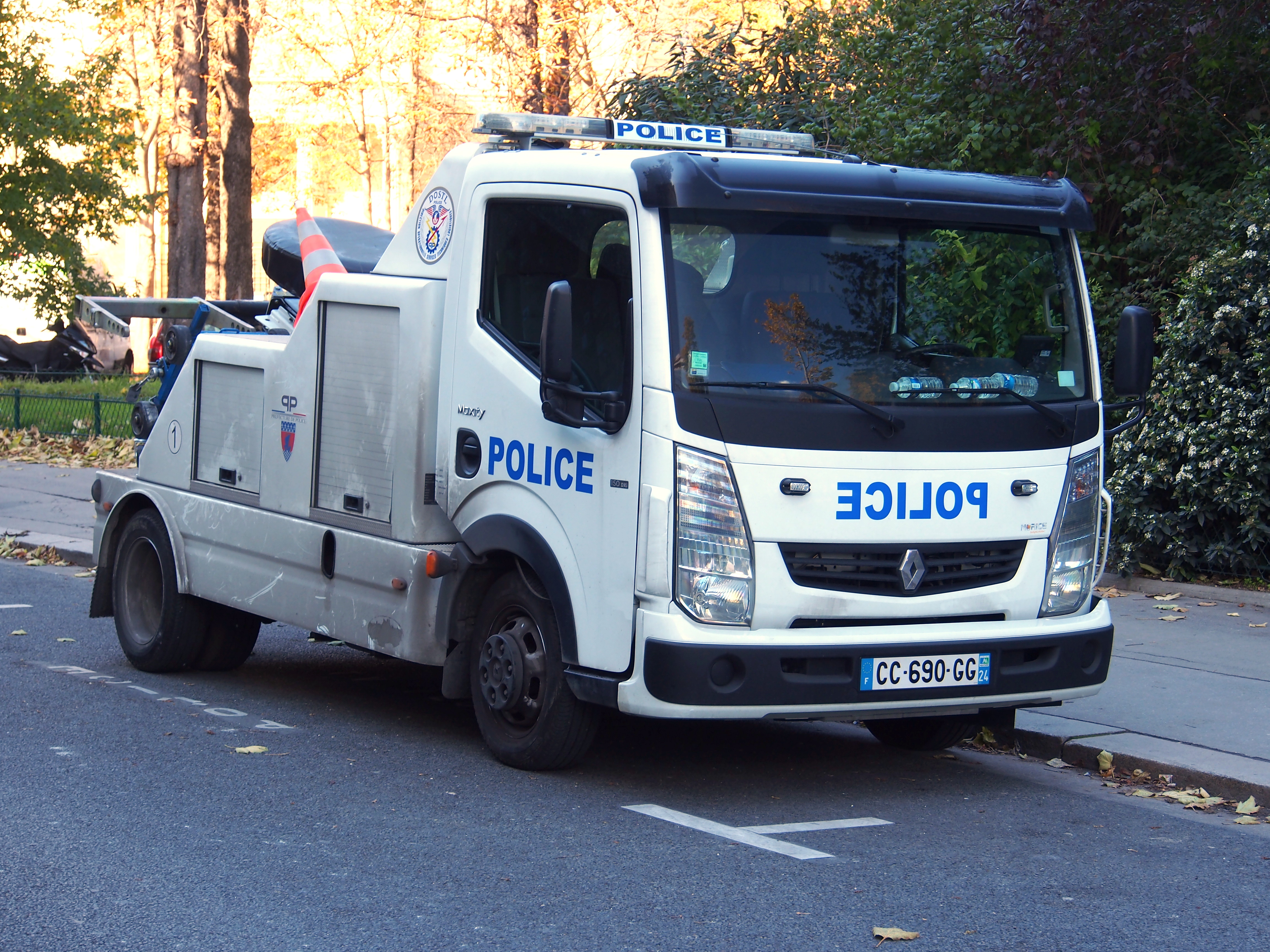
The Renault Maxity is available with an electric powertrain (Diesel tow truck version pictured).

Renault Trucks, part of Volvo, began selling an electric version of its Maxity small truck in 2010. Renault Trucks was the first to build heavy-duty trucks, with three prototypes of electric Renault Midlum and a later Renault D tested in real conditions by different customers (Carrefour, Nestlé, Guerlain) for a few years between 2012 and 2016. A prototype D truck was delivered to Delanchy in November 2017.

After testing is completed, Renault will commercialize its D and D Wide trucks in 2019. They will be built in France alongside their Volvo counterparts.

Renault Trucks has unveiled the models of its heavy-duty all-electric range in November 2022. The Renault Trucks E-Tech T and C, which are for regional distribution and construction, will be produced in series at the Bourg-en-Bresse factory from 2023.

==== Volvo ====
Volvo planned to launch their first mass-produced electric FE and FL trucks in early 2021, to be built in France alongside their Renault counterparts. An electric VNR semi-trailer truck was delivered to North American customers for testing in 2021. An updated VNR Electric is scheduled to begin production in 2022, in Dublin, Virginia.

== Single-brand corporations ==
=== Alkè ===
Some of the electric cars made by Alkè (for example the Alkè ATX 100 E) are used in soccer stadiums as open ambulances. The operator of London's cycle hire scheme uses a small number of Alkè electric utility vehicles (alongside other cars and vans) to tow trailers for distributing bicycles.

=== Autocar trucks ===
Autocar's E-ACTT is the fully-electric version of its leading ACTT terminal tractor model. Andrew Taitz, chairman of Autocar said, "The E-ACTT is the only original equipment manufacturer (OEM) terminal tractor with an OEM developed electric vehicle system, all Autocar".

Autocar announced two alpha units of the E-ACX low cabover model began field testing in August 2022.

=== Designwerk ===
In 2016, the Swiss company Designwerk launched its "Ecological and Quiet 26-Ton Electric Recycling Collection Vehicle" project, which was funded by the Swiss Federal Office of Energy and expanded over the course of the project into a flagship project, leading to its own product line of electric trucks based on Volvo and Daimler chassis. In May 2019, the company delivered its first 40-ton tractor unit with a 450 kWh battery capacity and, in November 2022, its first truck with a 1000 kWh battery capacity. The company began producing stationary, battery-buffered megawatt charging stations with MCS charging interfaces, designed specifically for use in the commercial vehicle industry. In August 2025, this system, combined with the Designwerk electric trucks, exceeded the megawatt charging power limit for the first time with 1,140 kW.

=== BYD ===
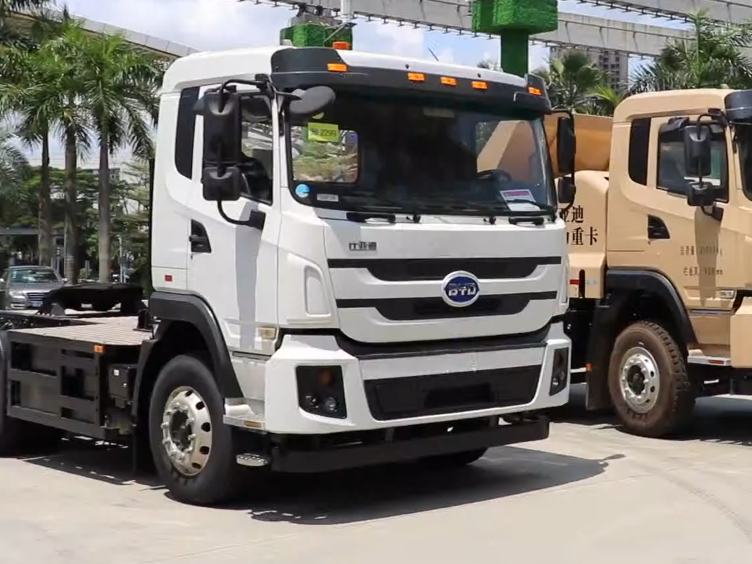
A white BYD 8TT electric truck

In China, BYD sold 7,969 all-electric/PHEV/hydrogen commercial vehicles in 2018, and 3,836 of them in 2019. These figures exclude buses.

The manufacturer sells light-, medium- and heavy-duty electric trucks. The heaviest of them is the 8TT, which is a Class 8 semi-tractor equipped with a 435 kWh battery. The Chinese manufacturer gained a foothold in the US market: its customers include Anheuser-Busch, which deployed 21 electric semi-tractors from BYD in California.

=== E-Force One ===
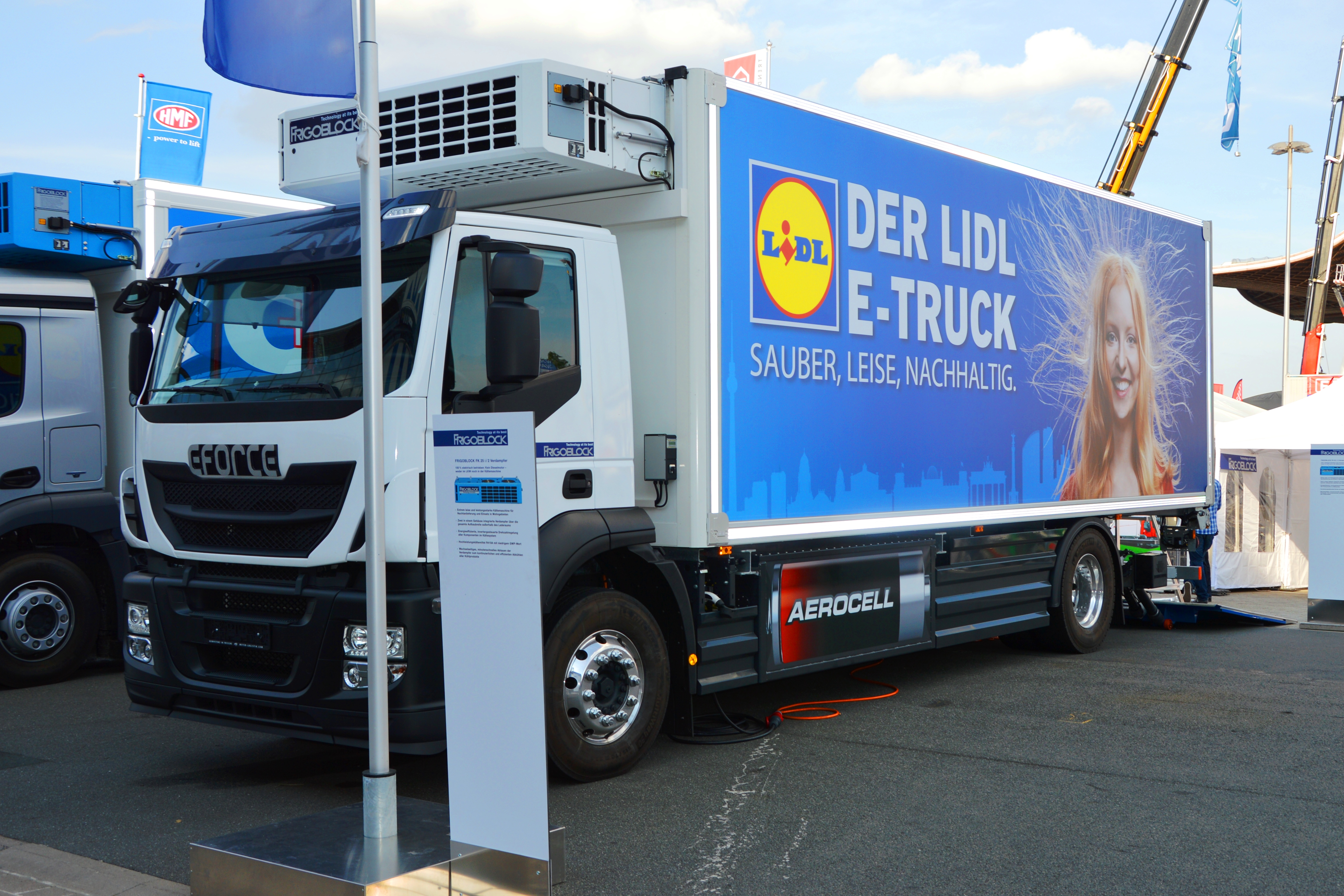
e-Force One

In January 2014, COOP Switzerland began operating an 18-ton (16 metric ton) electric truck with a replaceable battery. 18 square meters of photovoltaic elements are positioned on its roof. The truck's battery has a capacity of 300 kWh. The solar panels along with regenerative braking provide 23 percent of the total energy. The range is 240 km per day. Energy consumption is 130 kWh per 100 km. Net of the solar/regenerative energy it consumes about 100 kWh per 100 km, about 1/3 the energy needed by a comparable diesel engine. The truck weighs eight tons, with a gross vehicle weight of 18 tonnes and costs 380,000 Swiss francs. It is about twice as expensive as the diesel version. The truck is based on an Iveco Stralis chassis. The truck's operating price is 10 francs per 100 kilometres, much less than the diesel version at 50 francs per 100 kilometres. The truck has two LiFePO_{4} batteries with a capacity of 120 kWh with a weight of 1300 kg. The battery can be replaced within 10 minutes. Maintenance and the service life are not higher than a comparable diesel truck.

Two trucks began operating in mid-2014 at Lidl in Switzerland and one at Feldschlösschen Beverages Ltd. In June 2015, Pistor began operating one. Shipping company Meyer Logistics uses refrigerated models in Berlin.

=== Edison Motors ===
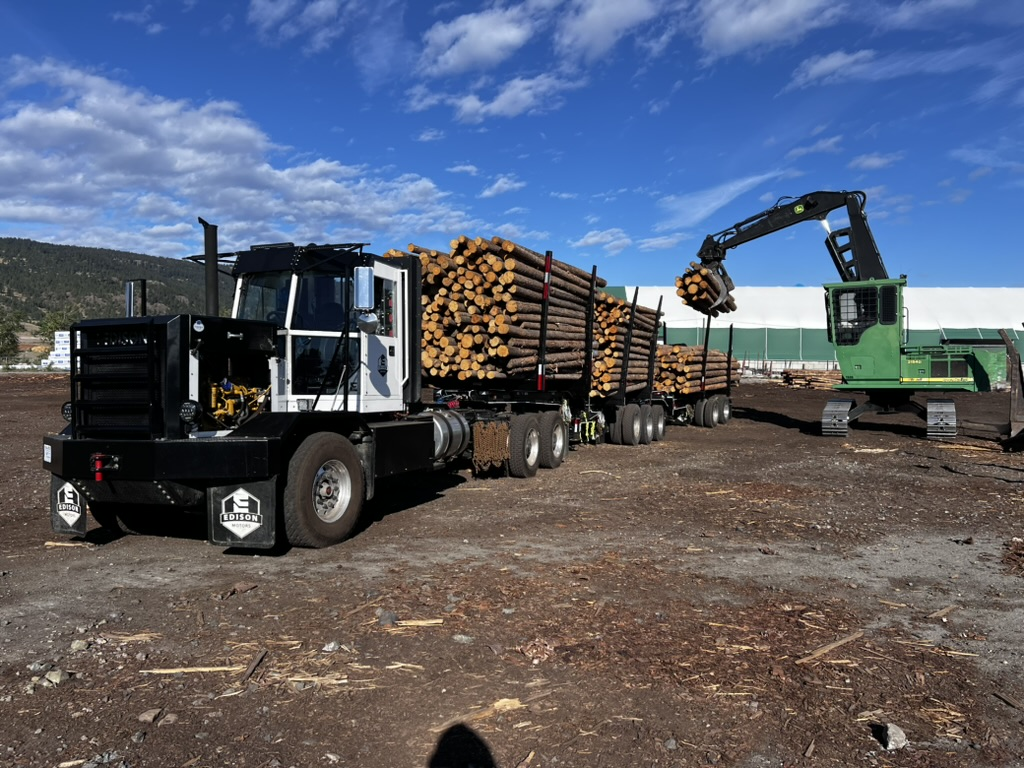
Edison Motors' diesel–electric logging truck

Edison Motors is a Class 8 hybrid electric-diesel and all-electric truck manufacturer based in BC, Canada. The company is focusing on trucks that service the heavy hauling needs of logging, the oil and gas industry, mining, construction and government services.

=== EVage Motors ===
EVage Motors is an Indian electric vehicle manufacturer focusing on the commercial electric vehicle sector. The company aims to enhance last-mile delivery solutions through its electric vehicles. EVage's flagship product, is a last-mile delivery van, the FR8.

=== GGT Electric ===
In 2011, GGT Electric, an automotive engineering, design and manufacturing company based in Milford, Michigan, introduced a new line of all-electric trucks for sale. GGT has developed LSV zero-emission electric vehicles for fleet markets, municipalities, universities, and state and federal government. The company offers 4-door electric pick-up trucks, electric passenger vans, and flatbed electric trucks with tilt and dump capability.

=== Haul truck ===
The company Lithium Storage GmbH is building together with the company Kuhn Switzerland AG a battery-powered haul truck. The vehicle is to go the end of 2016 in operation. The dump truck weighs 110 tons. The chassis is a Komatsu 605–7. The vehicles have an electric motor with 800 hp and can thus produce 5900 Nm. The battery is a 600 kWh lithium-ion battery. For comparison, diesel vehicles of this type consume approximately 50,000 to 100,000 liters of diesel per year.

=== Motiv Power Systems ===
Beginning in 2015 Motiv's delivery trucks have been in service with AmeriPride in linen delivery applications. Motiv electrified chassis were certified by the California Air Resources Board, enabling them to be sold through California state programs including HVIP. Motiv collaborates with existing truck body manufacturers to allow them to sell electric options using the electrified chassis as a drop in replacement on their existing manufacturing lines. An example of this type of manufacturing can be seen in the development of delivery vans with both Morgan Olson and Utilimaster.

=== Orange EV ===
Riverside, Missouri-based Orange EV began producing Class-8 all-electric terminal trucks for industrial use in 2012. It operates in 35 states in America and is the manufacturer in the country with the most zero emission trucks in operation. The company uses a turnkey approach that enables its clients to get end-to-end support. In June 2022, the 3rd generation 4x2 e-TRIEVER truck was announced.

Its e-TRIEVER truck has a gross vehicle weight rating of 81,000 lb, a max speed of 25 mph, maximum lift height of 62 inches, and battery capacity of 100 or 180 kWh.

After delivering over 950 Pure Electric Yard Dogs to the North American Market, In 2023, Orange EV introduced a second model, the HUSK-e. Designed to work in Port and Rail operations, it is capable of pulling up to 180k lb GCVW up to 32 mph and has a 243 kWh LFP battery pack.

=== Rokion ===
Rokion is the battery powered electric division of Prairie Machine & Parts Mfg. A vehicle design, manufacturing and engineering company based in Saskatchewan, Canada. Rokion introduced a full line of electric heavy-duty underground mining trucks ranging from utility vehicles to 12-passenger personnel transport vehicle.

=== Rivian ===
Rivian has produced the Rivian EDV since 2019. The original batch of vehicles were produced for Amazon.

=== Smith Electric Vehicles ===
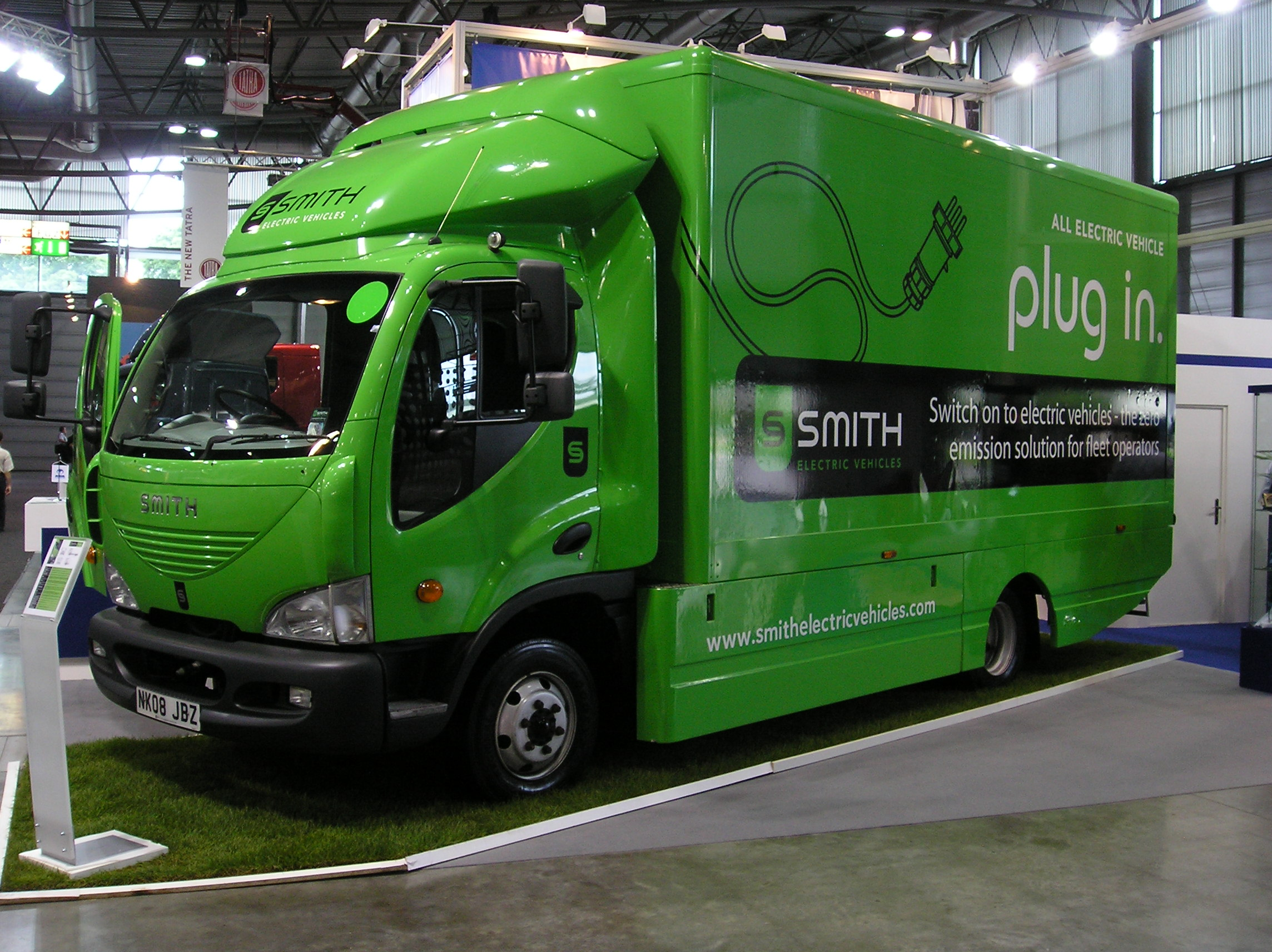
Smith Newton electric truck

Smith Electric Vehicles (also known as Smith's) was a manufacturer of electric trucks. The company, founded in 1920 in the north of England, moved its headquarters to Kansas City, Missouri in 2011. Smith suspended all operations in 2017.

Smith was a manufacturer of the world's largest range of zero-emission commercial electric vehicles, with gross vehicle weights (GVWs) from 3,500 to 12,000 kilograms (7,700 to 26,500 lb). From 2010 to 2015, the company produced over 800 commercial electric fleet vehicles. Formerly based in Washington, Tyne and Wear, it manufactured vehicles for the European, Canadian, Southeast Asian and US markets.

=== Terberg ===
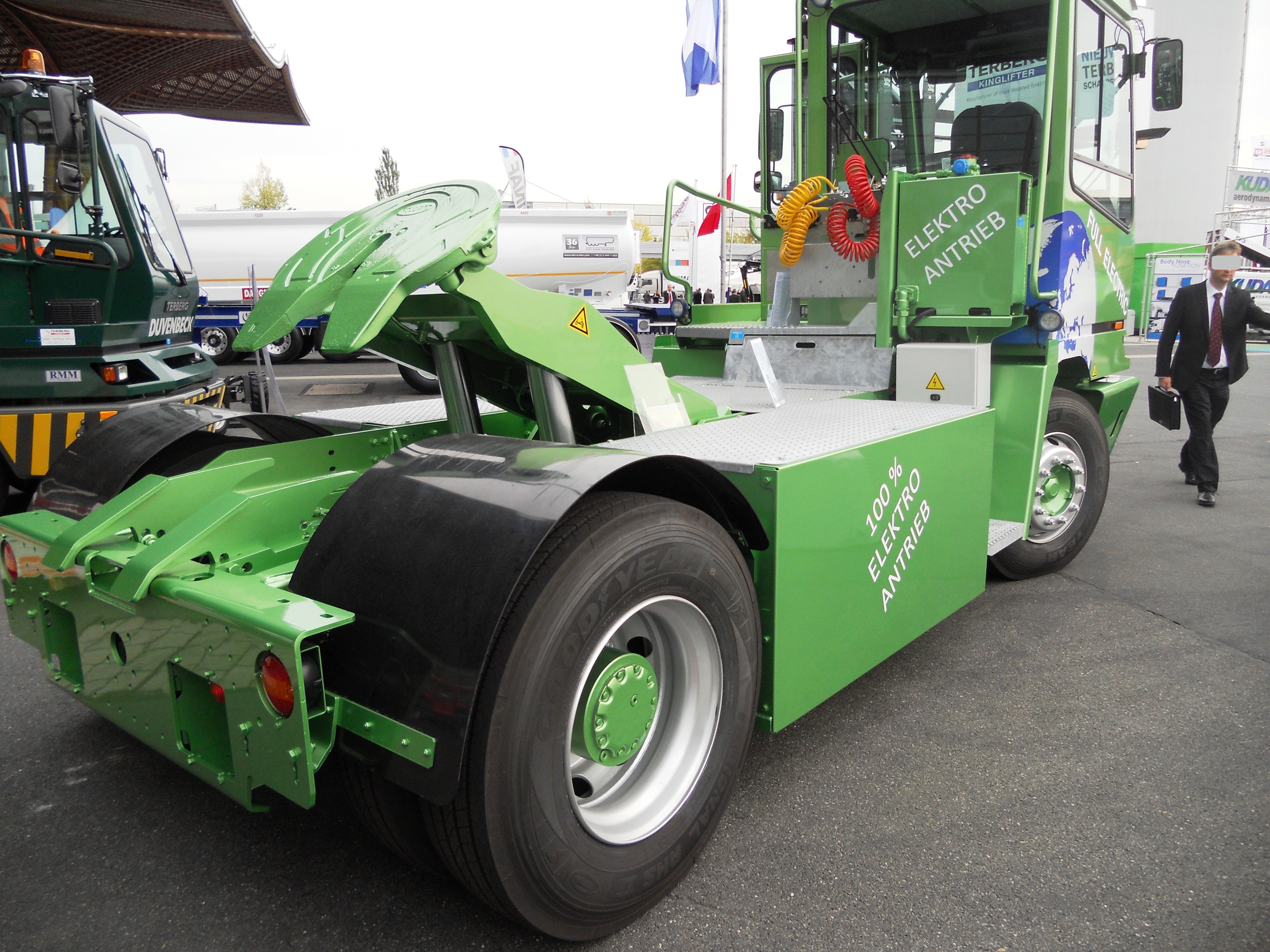
Terberg Electric tractor unit

The Dutch manufacturer, Terberg, has provided an electrically powered 40-ton truck for transporting material on public roads; it is reported to commute eight times a day between a logistics center and the Munich BMW plant. The truck battery takes three to four hours to charge. When fully charged, the vehicle has a range of up to 100 kilometres. Thus, the electric truck can theoretically complete a full production day without any additional recharging. Compared to a diesel engine truck, the electric truck will save 11.8 tons of CO_{2} annually.

=== Tesla ===
The Tesla Semi is a battery electric semi-trailer truck built by Tesla, Inc. since 2022. The truck is powered by three motors, has approximately three times the power of a typical diesel semi truck, and can operate at an energy use of less than two kilowatt-hours per mile (1.2 kW⋅h/km). The Semi has two models: one is rated for 325 miles (520 km), the other for 500 miles (800 km). It can haul 45,000 lb (20-long-ton; 23-short-ton) loads.

=== Tevva ===
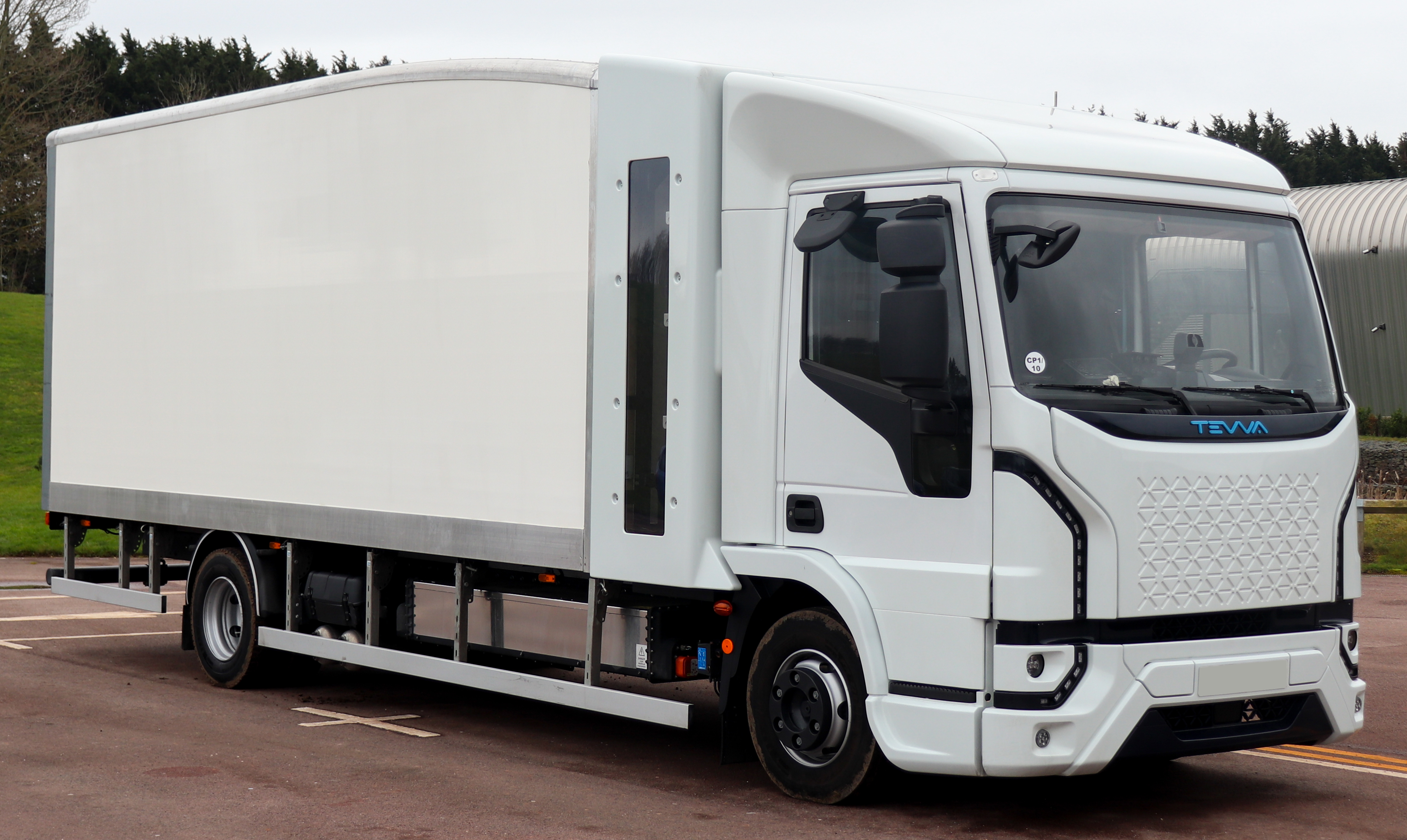
Tevva 7.5-tonne electric truck

In September 2021, Tevva unveiled its Tevva Truck – the first British designed 7.5-tonne electric truck intended for mass production in the UK. The truck has a range of up to 160 miles (250 km) in pure battery electric vehicle (BEV) form or up to 310 miles (500 km) with its patented range extender technology (REX). The Tevva Truck can carry up to 16 euro pallets and over two tonnes payload at 7.5-tonnes Gross Vehicle Weight (GVW). The total cost of ownership is comparable to a diesel; parity is achieved at approximately 3,000 km or when 500 litres of diesel is consumed per month.

=== VinFast ===
At the 2024 Consumer Electronics Show, VinFast introduced their first all-electric mid-size pickup truck VF Wild with length of 209 inches (5324 mm) and a width of 79 inches (1997 mm).

=== Volta ===
The company has developed a truck that gives the driver a 220-degree view, similar to what one might see on a city bus. The driver's seat is in the centre of the cab. On the inside of the 16-ton truck, called Volta Zero, sits a single unit containing an electric motor, transmission and rear axle supplied by OEM supplier Meritor. The truck has a range of between 150 and 200 km per charge.

=== Windrose ===
Windrose was founded by Wen Han in 2022 in China but aims at a global product but with local manufacturing in different regions. Reservations started in early 2026 with deliveries planned for the second half of 2026.

=== Workhorse ===
Workhorse Group (originally AMP Electric Vehicles) is an original equipment manufacturer and technology company headquartered in Sharonville, Ohio, United States. In 2025, it merged its operations with those of Motiv Electric Trucks, forming a new entity known as Workhorse.

It makes commercial electric vehicles and telematics software designed for last-mile delivery. Its products include commercial electric vehicles and the Metron telematics software system.

=== Xos ===
Xos, Inc. manufactures and sells Class 5, 6, 7, and 8 commercial and heavy-duty battery electric trucks for "last-mile" and "back-to-base" routes.

== See also ==
- List of electric bus makers
- Electric van
- Electric vehicle conversion
