= Dennis Eagle =

UK-based bin lorry manufacturer

Dennis Eagle Ltd.
- Type: Manufacturer
- Industry: Automotive; Waste
- Predecessor: Dennis Specialist Vehicles; Eagle Engineering
- Founded: 1907
- Headquarters: Warwick, England, UK
- Number of locations: 14 service centers (UK); 2 manufacturing sites (UK)
- Key people: Keith Day (Managing Director); Jon Sayers (Engineering Director); Jen Booker (HR Director); Geoff Rigg (Aftermarket Director); Andy Uttley (Finance Director); Richard Taylor (Sales & Marketing Director); Terry New (Operations Director); Will Marzano (Managing Director of Terberg Matec UK
- Products: Garbage truck; Chassis cab; Commercial vehicle
- Parent: Royal Terberg Group, 2016; Ros Roca, 2007; ABN Amro, 2004; NatWest Equity Partners, 1999; Mayflower Corporation, 1998; Hestair Group/Dennis Specialist Vehicles, 1972; Independent, 1895
- Subsidiaries: Dennis Eagle Inc; Terberg Matec UK

Dennis Eagle is a British commercial vehicle manufacturer headquartered in Warwick, England. They are primarily known for their refuse collection vehicles, and historically their work on Dennis Specialist Vehicles' fire engines.

Their products are primarily assembled by hand, with body and chassis assembly takes place at their Warwick headquarters, and cab production at a manufacturing facility in Blackpool. They produce over 1,100 'Elite' product range vehicles per year.

Dennis Eagle is the UK's market leader in refuse collection vehicles, with them also being popular globally in Australia, New Zealand, and Hong Kong.

Dennis Eagle Ltd control Terberg Matec UK and Dennis Eagle Inc (North America) as subsidiaries. They are owned by the Royal Terberg Group and operate underneath Terberg Environmental.

== History ==
=== Dennis Brothers (1895—1972) ===
In 1903, Dennis Brothers Limited began making their first commercial vehicles, vans, busses and eventually a fire engine in 1908. Their last car was made in 1913 after the Dennis brothers saw there was less competition in the commercial vehicle market. From there, they would be known throughout the early 20th century as builders of chassis for buses, fire engines, lorries, and later bin lorries.

In 1907, the Eagle Engineering Company, agricultural and general engineers of Warwick, was incorporated. It made oil and petrol internal combustion stationary engines and some small agricultural equipment and provided municipalities with refuse vehicles and road sweepers and tower lorries at relatively inexpensive prices sometimes built on Dennis chassis. Soon after the start of the Great Depression Eagle turned from engines to building road trailers and semi-trailers for articulated vehicles. They also added an electrical and wireless department and produced Chakophone wireless sets until 1936. Ownership changed numerous times during the 1960s.

=== Dennis Specialist Vehicles (1972—1991) ===
In autumn 1971, what would become Dennis Eagle began to form when Hestair Group bought Yorkshire Vehicles Limited in Leeds and Eagle Engineering Co in Warwick. Six months later, Hestair bought Dennis Motor Holdings and thereafter managed the businesses as the Vehicle Division of Hestair Engineering. Municipal bodies were made in Warwick by Hestair Eagle (incorporating Yorkshire Vehicles), and municipal chassis were made by Dennis in Guildford. The vehicle cabs were made in Blackpool on the old Dennis Bro's coach building site.

In 1973, Hestair set up a special Environmental Vehicles Division for its waste management activities.

In 1985 Hestair formed a new company called "Dennis Eagle", and appointed Jeremy Stoke of Duple Metsec as its managing director. Hestair constructed a new 125,000 square foot Dennis Eagle plant at the Heathcote Industrial Estate in Warwick, and subsequently moved commercial vehicle, municipal chassis, and municipal body production from Dennis in Guildford and Eagle in Saltisford, Warwick respectively. The new plant became the largest refuse vehicle manufacturing site in Europe.

In 1989, Shelvoke & Drewry were announced for sale in by their owner Krug International, and after struggling to find a buyer, they underwent a management buyout in 1990. Despite this, S&D went into receivership in 1991 and the assets were purchased by Dennis Eagle. About 70 Shelvoke staff were made redundant. Dennis Eagle claimed the extra business would add about £2.5 million to turnover. The order book was closed, and no new Shelvoke designs were made. The Letchworth factory closed after the remaining orders were filled. Parts and maintenance were provided by Dennis Eagle for existing S&D vehicles.

In 1991, Dennis Eagle's environmental vehicles represented around a third of Hestair's entire Vehicle Division.

In 1996, Dennis Eagle received a record-breaking order of 155 'Elite' Utility Vehicles from North West Water. The order was a significant marker in Dennis Eagle's attempt to break out of its commercial dependency on the municipal market.

In 1998, Dennis Eagle received £11.5m order from the RAF for specialist aircraft refuellers. They were capable of refuelling various aircraft's, from Apache helicopters to Harrier jump jets.

=== Private Equity (1999—2007) ===
In July 1999, following ever increasing changes to Dennis Eagle's parent company (from Hestair Group/Dennis Specialist Vehicles, to Trinity Holdings, to Dennis Group, to Mayflower Corporation) Dennis Eagle was sold into NatWest Equity Partners after 90 years alongside the other branches of the Dennis Group. The sale included Dennis Eagle's Blackpool cab production plant, which would still provide cabs for Dennis Fire vehicles. The new influx of cash from the sale allowed for greater engineering towards the new Phoenix 2 body, which landed in 2001.

In January 2004, Dennis Eagle was purchased by ABN Amro for £51m. Dennis Eagle sold approximately 600 vehicles per year and surpassed 1000 new Elite 2 vehicle registrations since its launch in 2003.

=== Ros Roca (2007—2016) ===
In 2007, Dennis Eagle was purchased by Ros Roca. The acquisition was driven by Ros Roca's desire for Dennis Eagle's Phoenix 2 body, and once the sale was confirmed they worked with Dennis Eagle to design and introduce the Olympus body. This replaced both companies' body product line-up, and Ros Roca subsequently took over engineering control. This left Dennis Eagle primarily as a truck design team, with a small team of body engineers to contribute UK market demands.

In 2007, production of Dennis Fire vehicles ended. Despite Mayflower Corporation splitting Dennis Eagle from the rest of the group in 1999, the Dennis Fire cabs were still produced by Dennis Eagle in Blackpool, and the fire chassis in Guildford by Alexander Dennis. Dennis Eagle could not sustain sparse production of the Rapier and Sabre cabs and demanded that Alexander Dennis order batches of 25 identical cabs. This was impossible to meet, so production unceremoniously ended almost 100 years after Dennis Brothers first fire vehicle. John Dennis Coachworks, the business bought by John (grandson of John Cawsey Dennis) from Dennis Specialist Vehicles in 1985, would continue to produce fire bodies for other manufacturers' trucks, until its closure on the 25th January 2019. Servicing for JDC bodies is available through Terberg DTS UK Ltd.

In 2015, Dennis Eagle ranked second in three axle new UK vehicle registrations, producing 494 trucks, most of which were 6x2 rear-steer's. DAF (983) ranked first, followed by Mercedes-Benz (470) in third, and Scania (422) in fourth.

=== Royal Terberg Group (since 2016) ===
In 2016, Ros Roca and Terberg Environmental merged to form the Terberg RosRoca Group. The Royal Terberg Group held the controlling interest. The various companies within the new group retained their trading names but replaced their logos and payoff with Terbergs. As part of the merger, Dennis Eagle became the owner of Terberg Matec UK (the combined UK brand of Terberg Machines and Terberg Technik).

In 2019, Dennis Eagle introduced the eCollect, the worlds first OEM all-electric refuse collection vehicle, aimed at reducing emissions and supporting sustainable waste management practices. The eCollect has since been adopted by local authorities in the UK.

In 2021, Dennis Eagle entered the North American market as "Dennis Eagle US" with their new ProView truck being built at a new facility in Summerville, South Carolina. In the UK market, the Elite+ was introduced. It featured a redesign of the cab with a flat interior, modern ergonomic controls, lower entry, and more open passenger access than the Elite 6. It retained largely the same chassis as the Elite 6.

In 2022, Dennis Eagle introduced the eCollect 4x2, the world's first OEM 4x2 18t EV. It came standard with a 10m^3 body capable of carrying 4.8 tonnes, the same as its diesel equivalent.

In 2023, Keith Day became the Managing Director following Kevin Else's retirement after 10 years in the role. This led to Jon Sayers and Terry New being appointed Engineering Director and Operations Director respectively. Production output for bodies, chassis and cabs each broke their all-time record. The Blackpool factory underwent a £500,000 renovation to increase production output.

In 2024, Dennis Eagle sold a record-breaking 151 new Elite+ vehicles to Birmingham City Council. Those vehicles replaced the council's older vehicles that were beyond their operational lifespan.

In 2025, Dennis Eagle and Terberg Matec UK consolidated their aftermarket technical support & field service engineer vans into a "one-stop-shop". Teams from both companies were trained to work on all the Terberg Environmental UK products. This was alongside the launch of a new specialised training centre at Dennis Eagle's HQ in Warwick. Combined Elite (Europe and Australia) new registrations exceeded 1,100 vehicles per year, with cumulative Elite registrations surpassing 10,000 since the Elite 6 launch in 2013. Dennis Eagle Inc ended new vehicle sales following the Liberation Day tariffs, marking the end of the ProView chassis. The Olympus Midi was launched in April 2025.

In 2026, Dennis Eagle's Elite product range was upgraded to the Allison 3000 xFE transmission, which claims to bring up to 6% in fuel savings. Production of the Terberg Orus was also started at Dennis Eagle Warwick due to the overwhelming demand at Worksop following the 'Simpler household recycling rules' coming into force on the 31 March, 2026.

Timeline of Dennis Eagle products (Since 1900)
Pax I
Pax II
Pax III
Pax IV
Pax V
Delta (Municipal)
Elite
Elite 2 (Europe)
Elite 2 (Australia)
Elite 6 (Europe)
eCollect
ProView (North America)
Elite+
Elite 6 (Australia)
Paxit I
Paxit II
Paxit III
Paxit IV
Paxit V
Bulkmaster
Phoenix
Beta 500
Phoenix 2
Beta 2
Olympus
Olympus Twin Pack
Olympus Duo
Olympus Mini
Olympus One Pass
Olympus Midi
Orus
│
1900
│
1910
│
1920
│
1930
│
1940
│
1950
│
1960
│
1970
│
1980
│
1990
│
2000
│
2010
│
2020
│
2030

== Dennis Eagle (Europe) ==
Headquartered in Warwick, UK, this site performs engineering and vehicle production for the UK, European and global market.

=== Standard vehicles ===
From	To	Name	Significance
?	?	Pax (I to V)	
1988	1992	Delta (Municipal)	The Perkins Phaser 180 engine and partially synchromeshed Eaton gearbox and improved cab ergonomics reduced the physical demand on the driver while boosting the serviceable lifetime.
1992	2003	Elite	The UK's first low entry cab, replaces the Delta/Municipal chassis.
2003	2014	Elite 2 (Europe)	This came with the Cummins ISLe 280 Euro 5 engine.
2013	2021	Elite 6 (Europe)	The name reflects its Euro 6 compliance.
2019	Present	eCollect	World's first OEM Electric RCV. Based on the Elite 6 architecture, available in wide or narrow width, and 6x2 or 4x2 wheelbases.
2021	Present	Elite+	Engineered with the same power train as the Elite 6, the Elite+ features an innovative redesign of the cab. It has a revolutionary flat interior and modern ergonomic controls, with lower and more open passenger access than the Elite 6. It also upgrades to noise dampening, ambient lighting, luggage storage, visibility, comfort, and 4 cup holders.

=== Special vehicles ===
Both before and after the split from the Dennis Group, Dennis Eagle has produced various special vehicles both inside and outside of the refuse collection market. These have ranged between one-off single vehicles to hundreds of vehicles.

From	To	Name	Type	Significance	Photograph
1993	?	Dennis Eagle Road Resurfacer	Complete vehicle	One of the earliest 'Elite' series special vehicles.	
1995?	?	Dennis Eagle Utility Vehicle	Complete Vehicle	The cab included a microwave and sink (also found in the Dennis Eagle RAF Refueller). This was powered by a low noise, hydraulically driven box mounted on the chassis offside containing a compressor and generator. Above this was a 4.5m3 storage box. In 1996, Dennis Eagle received a record-breaking order of 155 'Elite' Utility Vehicles from North West Water. The order was a significant marker in Dennis Eagle's attempt to break out of its commercial dependency on the municipal market.	
1998	2000	Dennis Eagle MOD (RAF) Airportable Refueller	Complete Vehicle	The Refueller was based on the Elite 6x4 RHD chassis. The powertrain included a Cummins C245-20 (241hp) engine and an Allison World Series MD3560 automatic transmission with retarder. The drivetrain included a standard Dana Spicer 8 tonne front axle, and an EATON Tandem Single Reduction Type 400/401 (6.57:1) rear axle on Norde Hendrickson HN460 20 tonne rubber rear suspension. The cab provided sleeping accommodation for two RAF crew members, storage for up to 350kg worth of equipment, a microwave and sink (also found in the Dennis Eagle Utility Vehicle). This was powered by a low noise, hydraulically driven box mounted on the chassis offside containing a compressor and generator. The fuelling equipment pod behind the cab contained two hose reels, a water separator and a flow meter, behind that was a 15,200-litre tank. Extra capacity could be provided by a 24-tonne, fourwheeled drawbar trailer carrying an additional 20,000 litres. The whole rig was designed to be carried in a Hercules C130 transporter, and to operate in temperatures between -30° and 50°C, fuelling various aircraft from Apache helicopters to Harrier jump jets. The original concept from the RAF was to provide a vehicle capable of staking out in the woods for a few weeks with a Harrier jump jet and await orders to launch. This would have been useful in the event the nearest airbase was bombed and the RAF needed to launch a Harrier jump jet for defence. It was designed to supprt a 2-man operation living in theatre unsupported for up to 7 days.	
?	2000	Dennis Eagle Milk Tanker	Complete vehicle	The first Dennis Eagle Milk Tanker, sold to Milk Marque.	The first Dennis Eagle Milk Tanker, sold to Milk Marque.
2005	2008	MAN TGA LowEntry	Cab	The cab for the MAN LGA LowEntry was designed and built by Dennis Eagle in Blackpool on behalf of MAN. It was based on the Elite 2 cab, and redesigned to fit onto the MAN TGA chassis.	
2010	2013	Renault Access	Chassis cab	Designed and built by Dennis Eagle in Warwick on behalf of Renault, this vehicle resulted from the alliance with Volvo Group. It was fitted with the Renault DXi 7 Euro 5 engine with a power output of 270 hp or 310 hp. It was first sold in France in 2010 before gradually becoming available on other European markets. Production ceased around 2013 with the introduction of the Dennis Eagle Elite 6, and was replaced by the Renault Trucks D Access.	
2013	2018	Renault Trucks D Access	Chassis cab	Designed and built by Dennis Eagle in Warwick on behalf of Renault, this vehicle resulted from the alliance with Volvo Group. and was sold by Renault to European markets. It was fitted with the Renault DTI 5 5.1 L inline-four engine with a power output of 210 or 240 hp. Production ceased around 2018 due to the cost of continued development.	
2013	2021	PVI 26T electric chassis	Glider	Dennis Eagle sold Elite 2 and Elite 6 glider chassis to PVI. Once kitted by PVI as an EV, it had a 9 tonne payload and a 255 kWh battery. These were typically then shipped back to Dennis Eagle in Warwick to be fitted with an Olympus body	

=== Environmental equipment ===
From	To	Name	Type	Significance
?	?	Paxit (I to IV & Major)	Body	
?	?	Bulkmaster	Body	
1979	2001	Phoenix	Body	Rear loading RCV featuring intermittent 'sweep-slide' packer. Most were fitted to the Dennis Delta from 1979 to 1992, which used a joint cab design shared with Shelvoke & Drewry (marketed as the "P-type" by S&D).
?	?	Beta 500	Binlift	
2001	2014	Phoenix 2	Body	Replacement for the Phoenix, although closely based on the Ex-Cell model.
?	Present	Beta 2	Binlift	
2010	Present	Olympus	Body	A minor upgrade from the Phoenix 2 resulting from the merger with Ros Roca. Available in many sizes.
2010	Present	Olympus Twin Pack	Body	Two body compartments that can individually hold different types of waste.
2010	Present	Olympus Duo	Body	Two waste compartments. Essentially a smaller Olympus with a pod at the front.
2010	Present	Olympus Mini	Body	Compact version of the Olympus intended to be mounted on smaller vehicle.
2012	Present	Olympus One Pass	Body	Three waste compartments. Essentially a smaller Olympus Twin Pack with a pod.
2025	Present	Olympus Midi	Body	Engineered by Ros Roca in Spain, it fits on to the 12-16 tonne category of vehicles (like the DAF XB series or an Iveco Eurocargo), these bodies store either 9.8 m³ (OL-MIDI 10), 10.8 m³ (OL-MIDI 11), or 11.8 m³ (OL-MIDI 12) depending on the vehicle wheelbase.
2026	Present	Terberg Orus	Body	Engineered and primarily built by Terberg Matec UK in Worksop, it fits onto the 3.5 to 7.5 tonne category of vehicles (like the Isuzu N75 series), these bodies can store between 5.5 to 7m³ depending on the vehicle wheelbase. In 2026, production was also started at Dennis Eagle Warwick due to the overwhelming demand at Worksop following the 'Simpler household recycling rules' coming into force on the 31 March, 2026.

== Dennis Eagle Inc (North America) ==
Dennis Eagle Inc, also known as Dennis Eagle US, began production of the ProView trucks at a new facility at 104 G Pinnacle Way, Summerville, South Carolina in 2021. The plant manufactures ProView's for dealerships and distributors in the USA and Canada.

On April 2, 2025 President Donald Trump announced the Liberation Day tariffs, which forced Dennis Eagle Inc to end new vehicle sales two weeks later. Production of the final ProView was completed 3 months later. Dennis Eagle Inc remains in operation, now only offering support, parts and servicing of the legacy ProView fleet.

From	To	Name	Significance
2021	2025	ProView	The ProView was designed specifically for the North American market. Derived from the Australian and European Elite 6, it offers driver visibility and safety, with a design fully tailored to meet American needs. This includes stronger chassis rails, a more powerful Cummins powertrain, and parts sourced from American suppliers.

== Dennis Eagle Australia ==
Dennis Eagle produces trucks, but not environmental equipment, for the Australian market at its headquarters in Warwick, England. These are shipped to Australia by boat and are sold by Penske Australia & New Zealand dealerships.

From	To	Name	Significance
?	2022	Elite 2 (Australia)	Had the same power train and interior as the European market, but had a modified cab structure with rear windows. Unlike in Europe, these commonly came equipped with dual controls (steering wheel and pedals) to give better visibility when using an automated side loader.
2022	Present	Elite 6 (Australia)	Unlike the European Elite 6, it came equipped with a Cummins ISB B6.7 E6C 290 bhp Euro 6 engine to align with the preferences, parts availability, and expertise of Australian mechanics.
