= Royal Terberg Group =

Dutch brand of trucks

Royal Terberg Group B.V.
- Founded: 1869 in Benschop, Utrecht Netherlands by Johannes Bernardus Terberg
- Headquarters: IJsselstein, Utrecht, Netherlands
- Area served: Worldwide
- Key people: Johannes Terberg, Willem Terberg, George Terberg, Godfried Terberg
- Products: Specialist Trucks
- Number of employees: 3,000 approx.
- Divisions: Terberg Environmental Group; (formerly Terberg RosRoca Group); Terberg Special Vehicles; Terberg Lease Group; Terberg Technology; Terberg Kinglifter
- Subsidiaries: Ros Roca; Dennis Eagle; Terberg Matec; Terberg Benschop; Terberg Kinglifter; Terberg Machines; Terberg Middle East; Terberg Services Solutions; Terberg Special Vehicles; Terberg Technology; Terberg Justlease; Terberg Tractors; Terberg DTS; Hightech Auto; HS Fahrzeugbau; Manuport
- Website: https://www.royalterberggroup.com/en/

The Royal Terberg Group B.V. is a specialised vehicle manufacturer based in IJsselstein, Utrecht, Netherlands, building special trucks and fitting specialist equipment to other manufacturers’ trucks, cars and vans.

Customers operate terminals at ports, airports and logistic centres. Other specialised vehicles are supplied to the construction, mining and tunnelling industries. Terberg heavy-duty tractors and low-entry trucks are used by all sectors. Electric tractors are available.

Headquarters are in IJsselstein. Headquarters for Germany are in Hamburg with branches in Bochum and Bad Rappenau.

Terberg also makes waste collection systems and truck-mounted forklifts. In the Netherlands, Terberg provides financial services including leasing and rental arrangements for passenger cars and commercial vehicles.

Subsidiaries operate in the Netherlands, United Kingdom, Germany, Belgium, France, Spain and Poland as well as Malaysia and the United Arab Emirates and, in America, in Brazil and the United States.

Terberg began as blacksmiths, built carriages and after World War II renovated war-surplus trucks. Terberg built its first truck in 1966 using components from a variety of manufacturers. Ultimately Terberg standardised with Volvo components in their heavy-duty trucks.

== Gallery ==
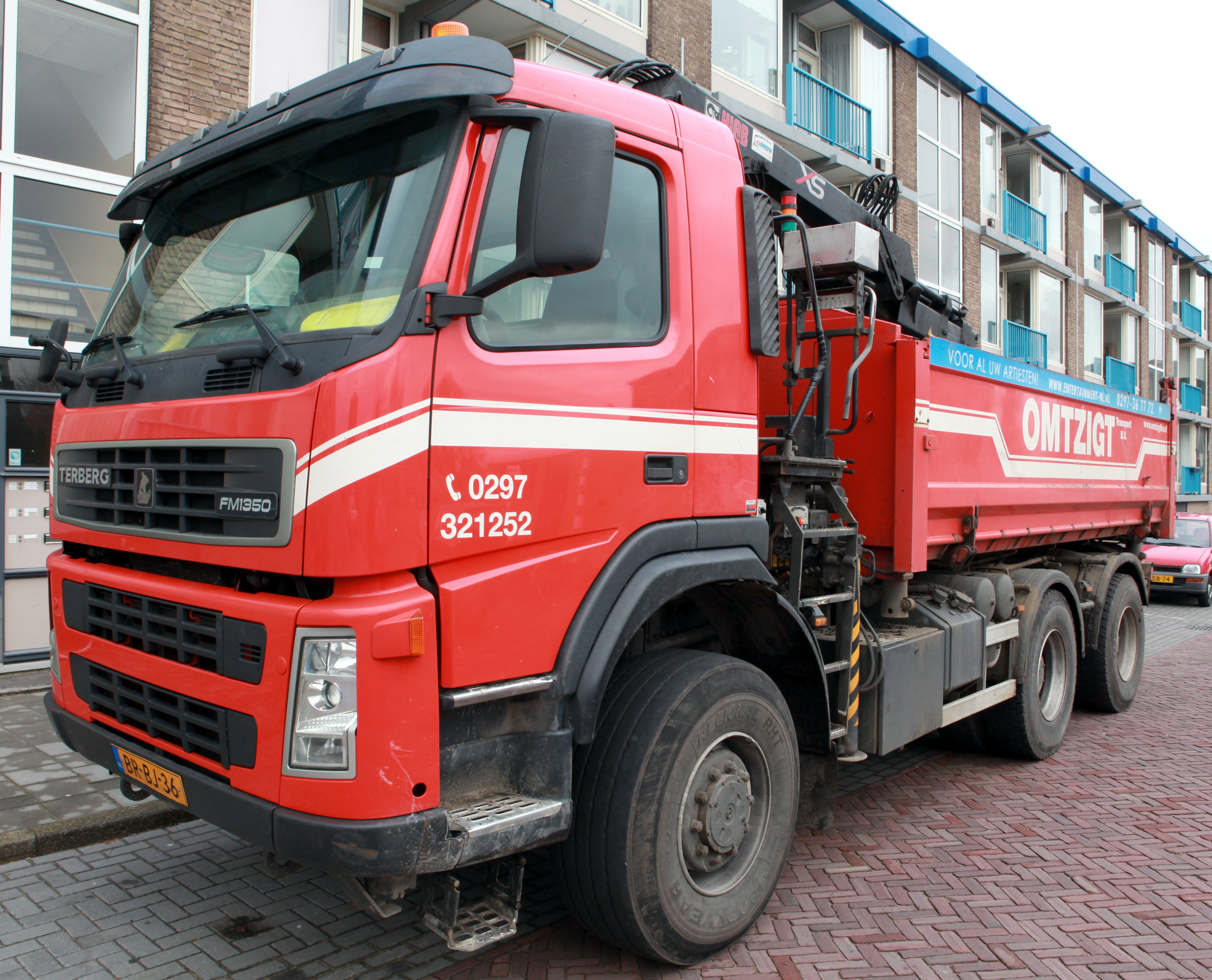
FM 1350 6 x 6

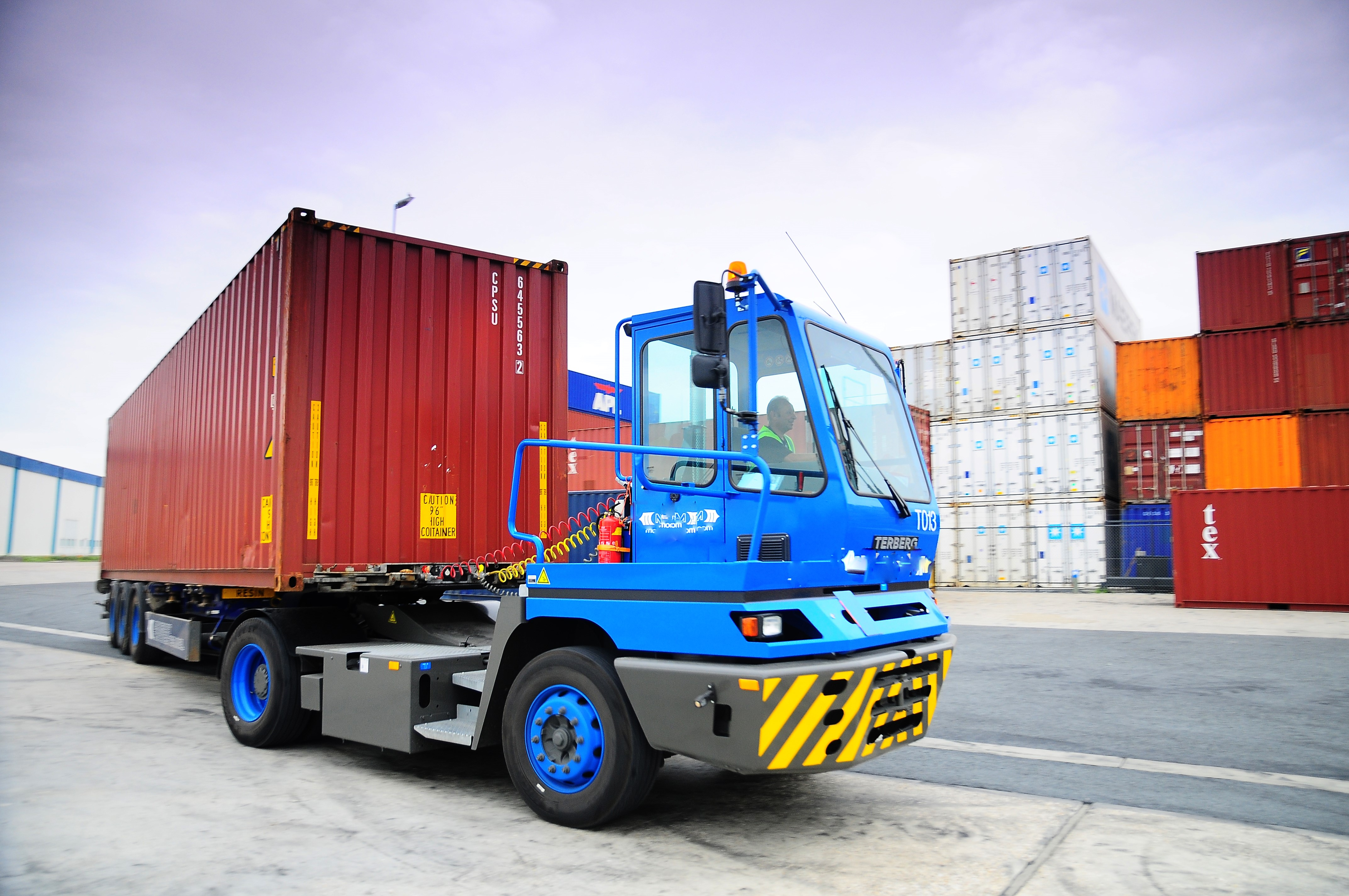
Yard Trekker tractor unit

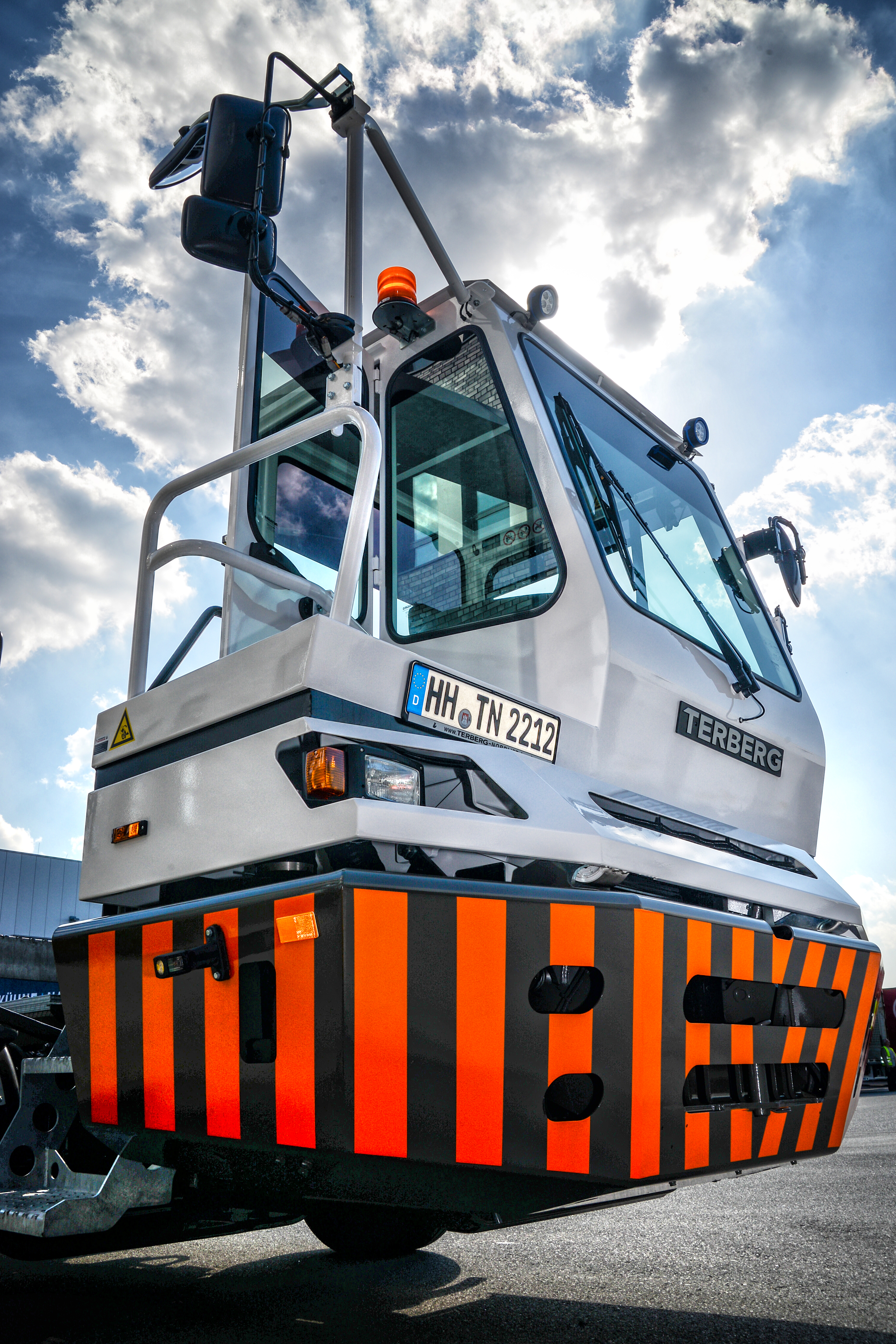
Swap body carrier

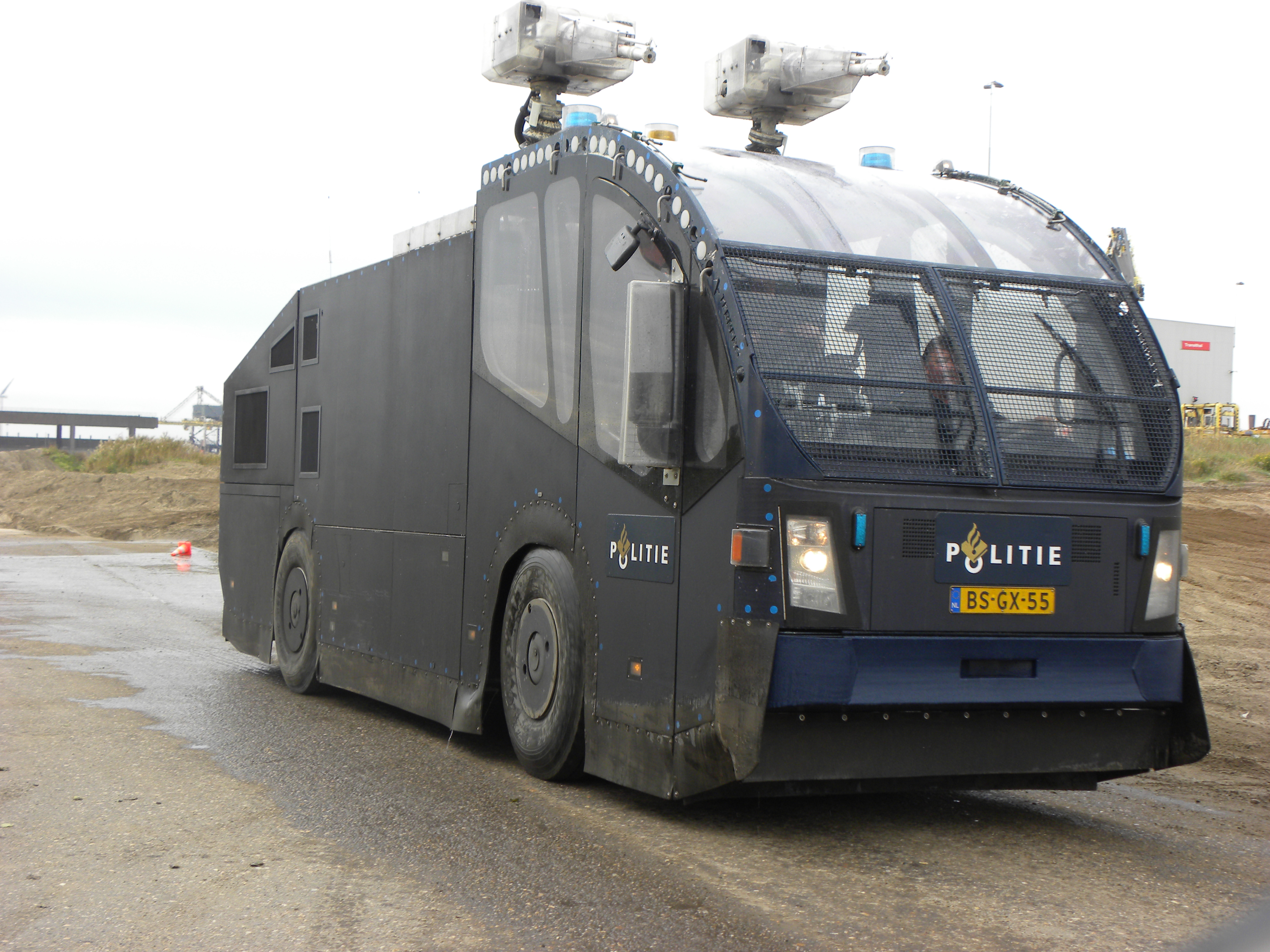
Riot control truck

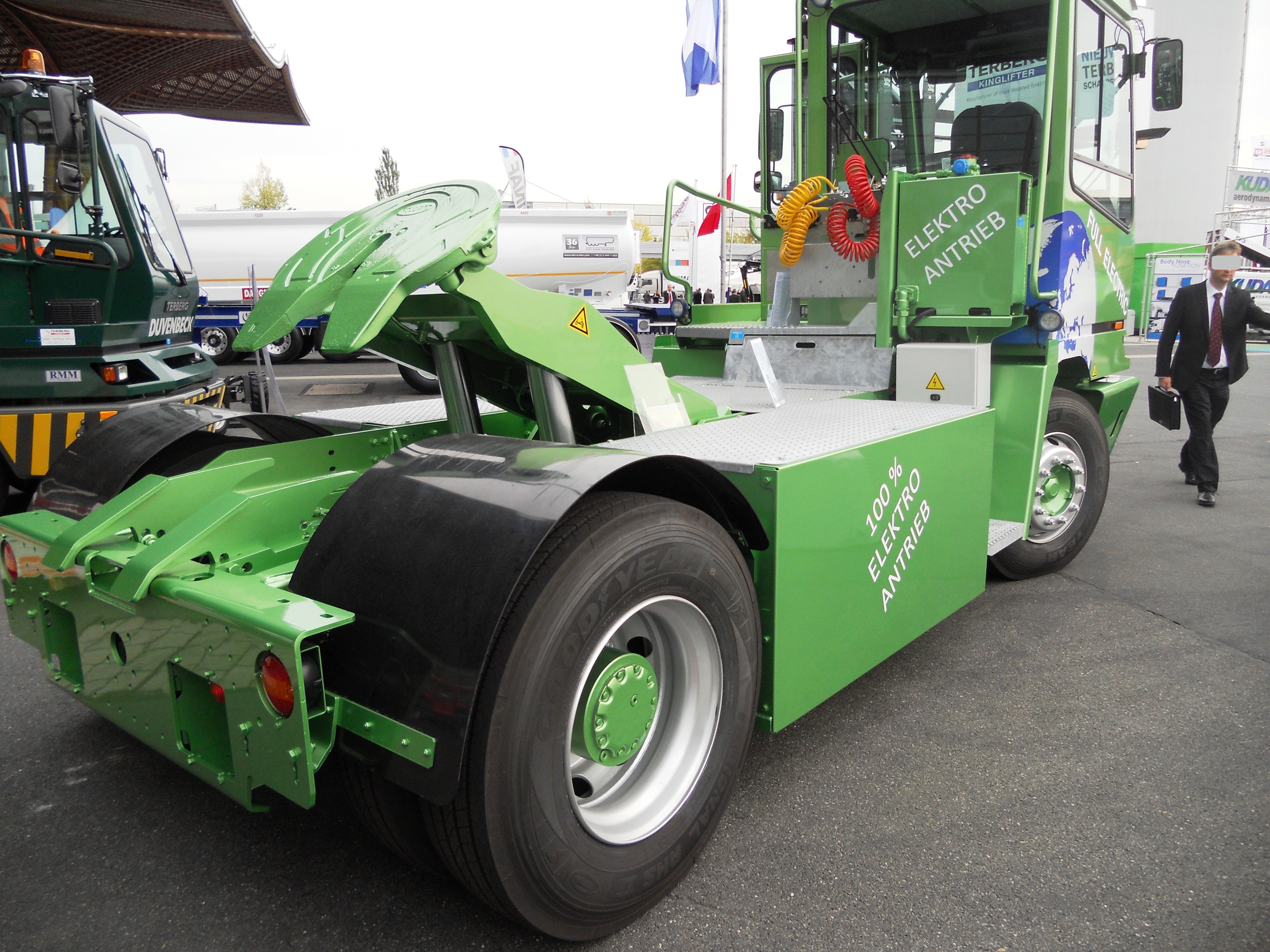
Electric tractor unit

== Terberg RosRoca Group ==
Terberg RosRoca Group, established in 2016, is managed from Warwick, England where Ros Roca's former subsidiary, Dennis Eagle, is located. Terberg Group holds the controlling share of Terberg RosRoca.

Terberg RosRoca Group was formed by merging the Environmental division of Terberg Group and Ros Roca of Spain. The components retained their trading names.

When the merger was arranged Terberg RosRoca Group had 1,300 employees around the world and annual turnover of €385 million. There were production plants in the UK, Netherlands, Spain, Germany, Brazil and China.

In March 2022, it was announced that the Terberg RosRoca group would revert to its previous trading name as the 'Terberg Environmental Group'.

== See also ==
Other Netherlands truck manufacturers

- DAF Trucks
- GINAF
