= Ros Roca =

Ros Roca SA
- Industry: manufacturer of waste management equipment
- Founded: 1953 in Agramunt, Lleida, Catalonia, Spain
- Headquarters: Tàrrega, Spain
- Area served: Worldwide
- Key people: Godfried Terberg; CEO Terberg RosRoca Group
- Products: waste management equipment
- Owner: Terberg Group
- Website: Terberg-Ros Roca Website

Ros Roca SA is a Spanish manufacturer of waste management machinery managed from Tàrrega, Catalonia, Spain and is a subsidiary of Terberg RosRoca Group.

Ros Roca was founded in 1953 by Ferran Ros and Ramon Roca i Sala. They manufactured agricultural equipment and machinery and soon expanded into water collection equipment.

Today Ros Roca's products include: refuse collectors, bin washers, water spraying tankers, sweepers, pavement washers, sewer equipment and trash compactors for waste treatment plants and street cleaning.

== Ros Roca Environment ==
Ros Roca Environment, established in 2007, incorporated the following businesses: Ros Roca (Spain), Dennis Eagle (UK), Usimeca (Brazil, Chile and Mexico), Eurovoirie (France), HS (HN(Huffermann) Schorling) Fahrzeugbau (Germany) and Resitul (Portugal).

Following the merger with Terberg Environmental in 2016, Ros Roca Environment's subsidiaries are now part of the Terberg Ros Roca Group.

== Terberg RosRoca Group ==
Terberg RosRoca Group, established in 2016, is managed from Warwick, England where Ros Roca's former subsidiary, Dennis Eagle, is located.

Terberg Group B.V. holds the controlling share of Terberg RosRoca.

Terberg RosRoca Group was formed by merging the Environmental division of Terberg Group of the Netherlands, Terberg Environmental and Ros Roca Environment. The component subsidiaries retained their trading names.

When the merger was arranged, Terberg RosRoca Group had 1,300 employees around the world and annual turnover of €385 million. There were production plants in the UK, Netherlands, Spain, Germany, Brazil and China.
