= Renault Access =

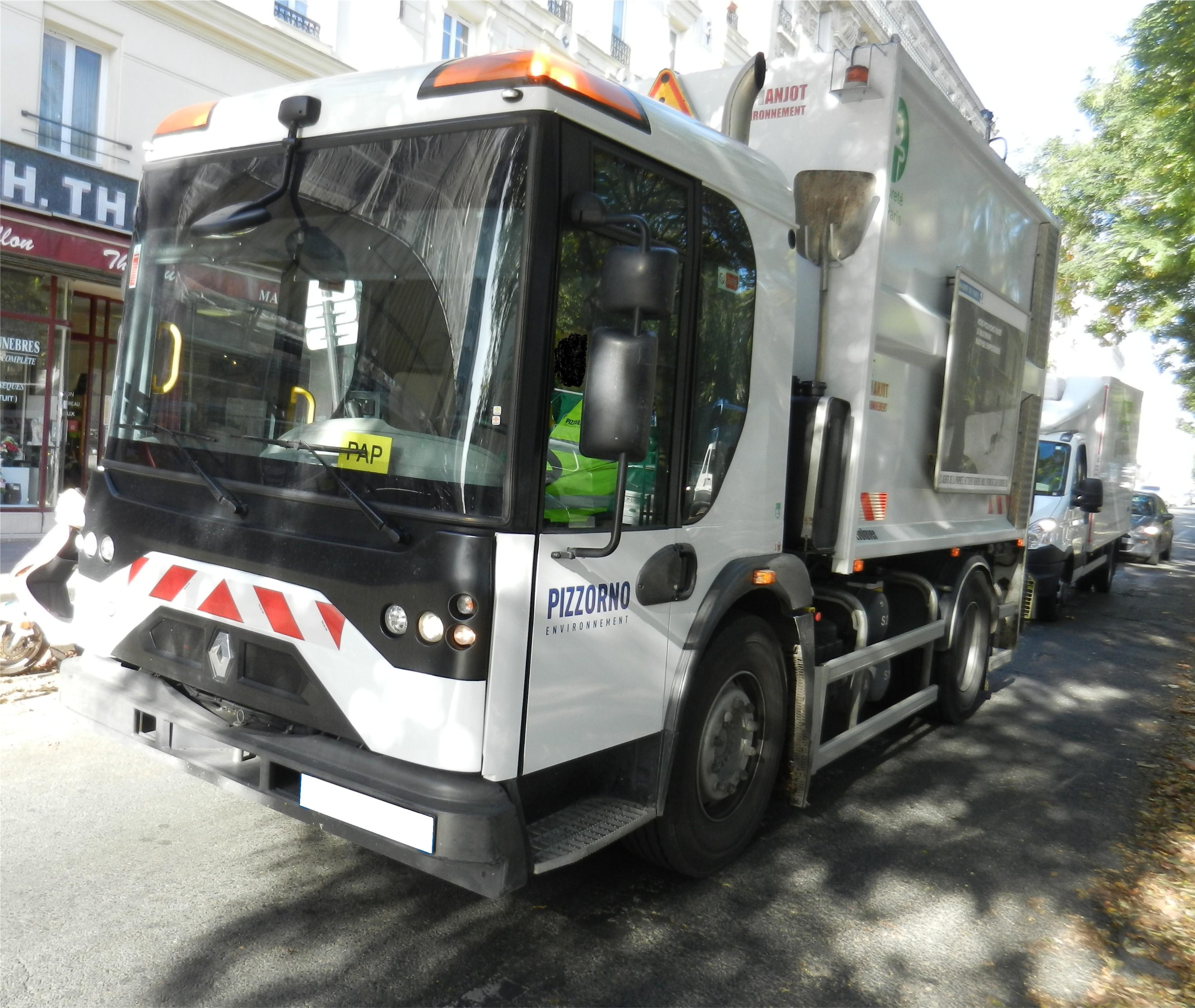

Overview
- Manufacturer: Renault Trucks
- Also called: Dennis Eagle Elite 2
- Production: 2010–2013
- Assembly: Warwick, England

Body and chassis
- Class: Waste collection vehicle
- Body style: Low cab forward

Powertrain
- Engine: Diesel: Renault 7.1 L, 270 hp (200 kW) or 310 hp (230 kW)
- Transmission: 4x2 / 6x2*4 6-speed automatic transmission

Dimensions
- Length: 7,070 mm (278.3 in)
- Width: 2,290–2,500 mm (90.2–98.4 in)
- Height: 3,500 mm (137.8 in) (overall)
- Curb weight: 19,000–26,000 kg (41,888–57,320 lb) (GVW)

Chronology
- Predecessor: Renault Puncher
- Successor: Renault Trucks D Access

The Renault Access is a truck manufactured by Dennis Eagle and marketed by Renault Trucks. It is a rebadged version of the Dennis Eagle Elite 2.

In 2013, Renault Trucks unveiled at the Solutrans exhibition in Lyon a slightly updated version, now named the Renault Trucks D Access, which is still based on the Dennis Eagle truck.

== Overview ==
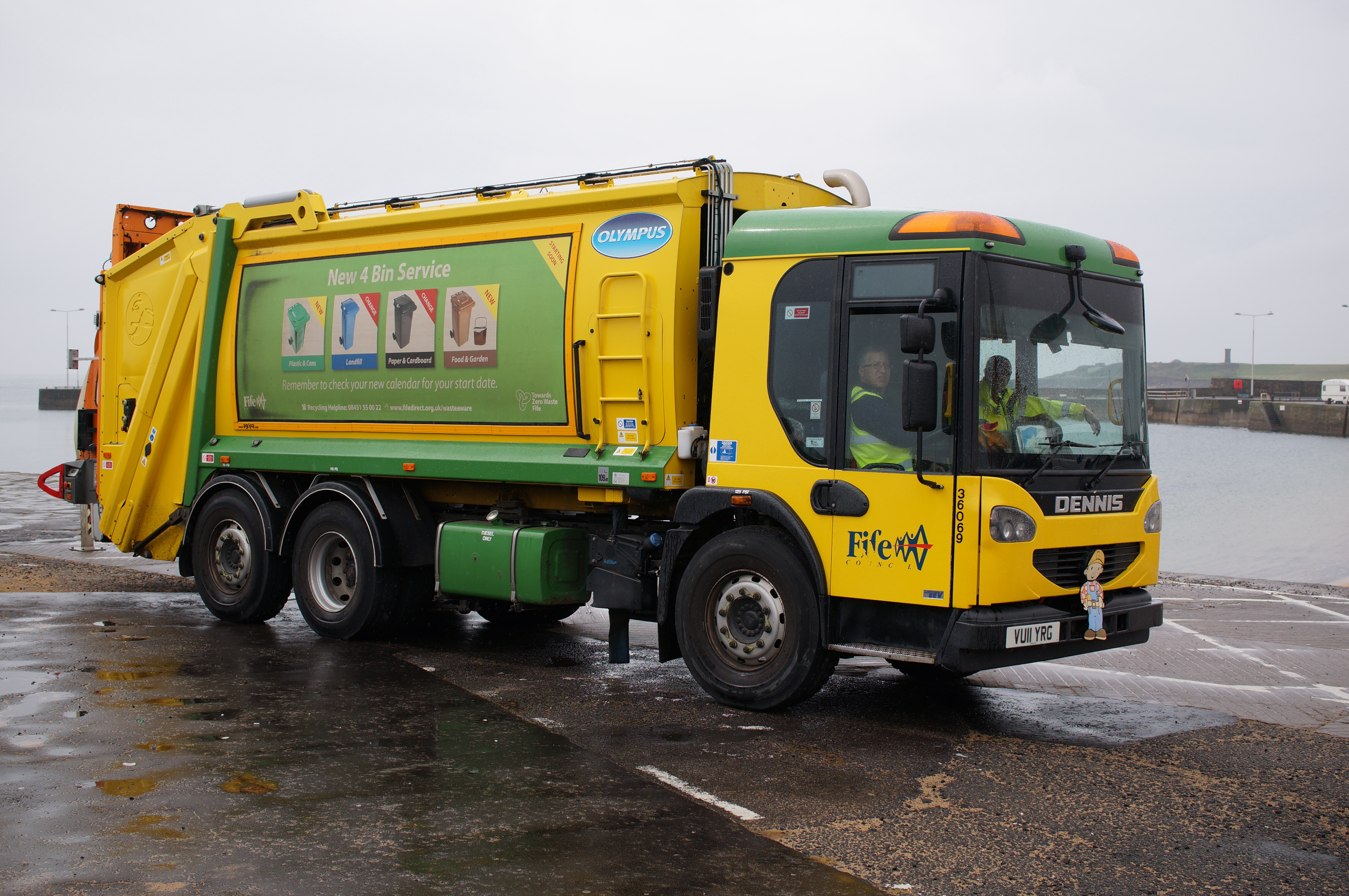
2011 Elite 2 refuse truck

A successor to the Renault Puncher, it is mainly used for the collection of household waste.

Having a lowered cabin equipped with a bus-type door accessible by a step located 435 mm (17.1 in) from the ground, it is used mainly in trades requiring frequent ascents and descents.

It is available in two variants of width.
