= Wen Han =

Chinese entrepreneur and business executive

- 韩文
- Born: Circa. 1991 (age 34–35); Anhui, China
- Education: Stanford University
- Occupation: Entrepreneur
- Known for: Founder Windrose Technology, an electric truck startup company

Wen Han (Chinese: 韩文) is a Chinese entrepreneur and business executive. He is the founder, chairman, and CEO of Windrose Technology, a Chinese electric truck manufacturer specializing in long-haul heavy-duty vehicles. Han founded Windrose Technology in 2022 to develop battery-electric semi-trucks for international markets.

== Early life and education ==
Wen Han was born in China and later attended school in the United States. He attended Williams College in Massachusetts and obtained an MBA from Stanford University.

== Career ==
Han founded the electric truck maker Windrose Technology in 2022. It was originally based in Hefei, China, but the company was later incorporated in the Cayman Islands and shifted operations to Antwerp in Belgium.

He announced plans to expand into Europe and establish U.S. assembly operations in 2024, an uncommon strategy among Chinese electric vehicle startups. In the same year, Windrose increased its IPO fundraising target during its European expansion and scheduled U.S. production to begin in 2025. Han partnered his company with the United Nations Development Programme (UNDP) to support research on sustainable trucking solutions. Windrose's technology provides high-power charging systems in collaboration with BorgWarner.
