= Renault Trucks D =

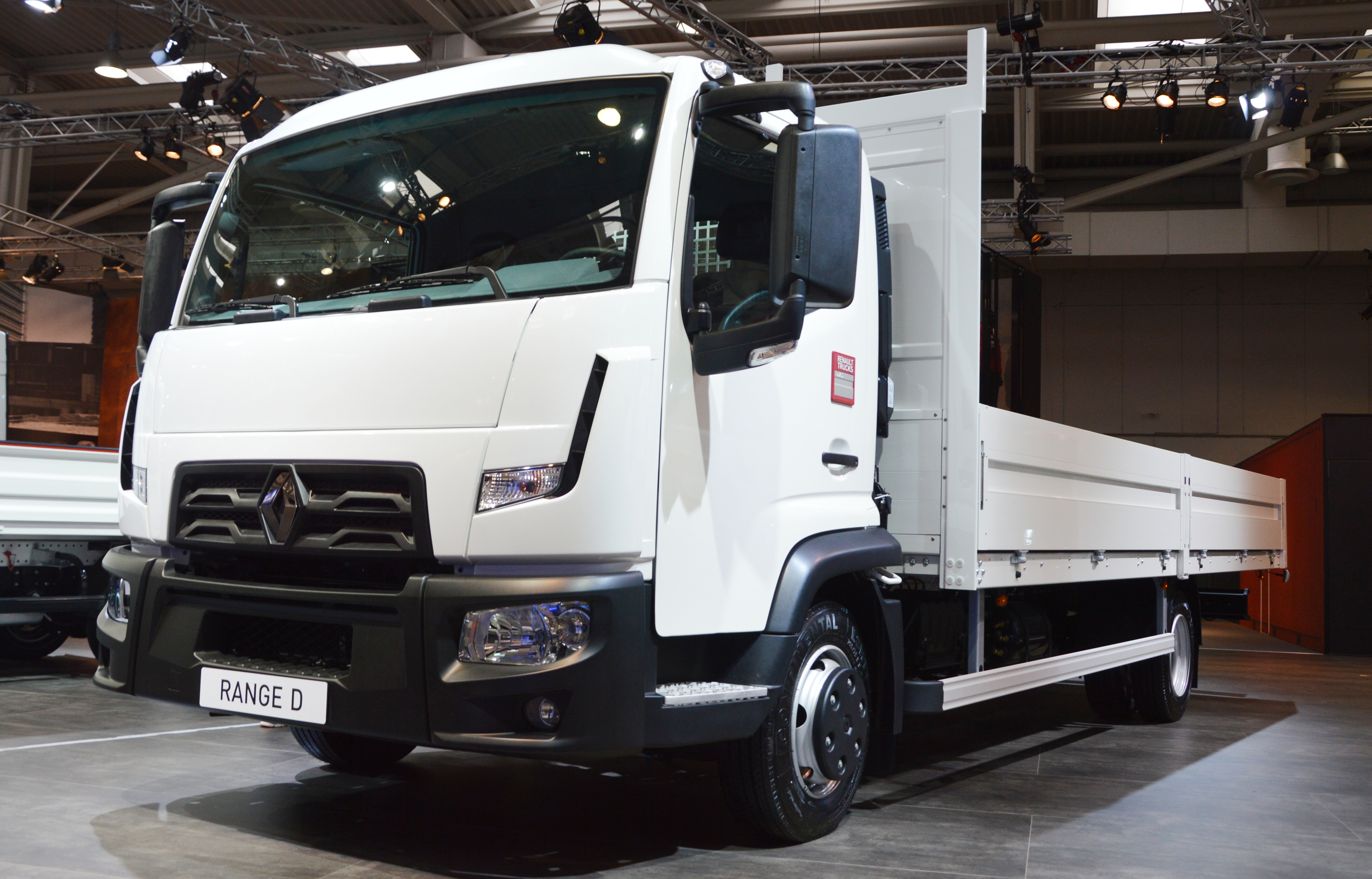
- A Renault Trucks D Cab 2 m

Overview
- Manufacturer: Renault Trucks
- Production: 2013–present
- Assembly: Blainville-sur-Orne, France (D and D Wide); Tehran, Iran (Saipa Diesel) (D Wide); Ávila, Spain (D Cab 2 m)

Body and chassis
- Class: Medium truck
- Body style: COE: Day Cab; Global Cab; Night & Day Cab; Sleeper Cab

Powertrain
- Engine: 5.1 L DTI 5 I4 common rail 7.7 L DTI 8 I6 common rail 3 L DTI 3 I4 common rail all-electric drive
- Transmission: Automatic

Chronology
- Predecessor: Renault Premium Distribution; Renault Midlum; Renault Access

The Renault Trucks D is a range of medium duty trucks for distribution manufactured by the French truckmaker Renault Trucks. It was launched in 2013 to replace the Midlum, the Premium Distribution and the Access.

== Overview ==
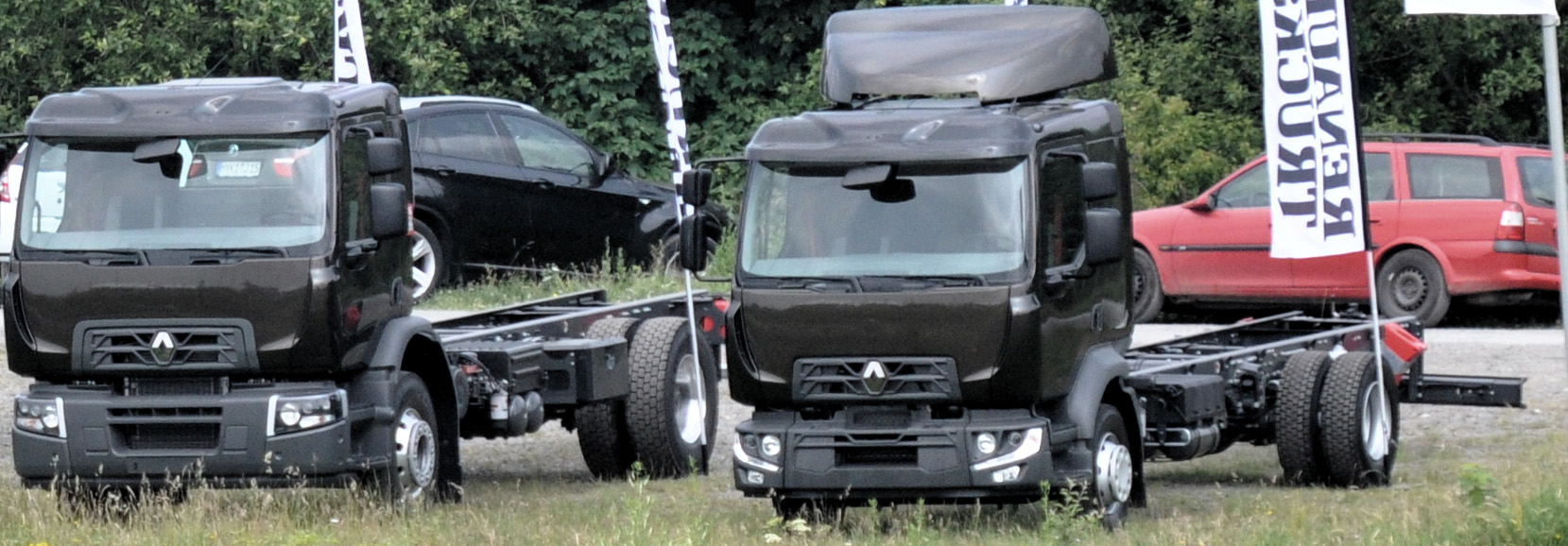
The Renault Trucks D Wide (left) and D (right)

The D incorporates automatic transmission as standard in all its versions (except the D Cab 2 m) and new comfort and security features.

The D range is made up of four models: D, D Wide, D Access and D Cab 2 m. The D and the D Wide are derived from the Midlum and the Premium Distribution respectively. The D Access is supplied by Dennis Eagle. The D Cab 2 m is a badge-engineered version of the Nissan NT500, assembled in Spain by Nissan.

== Engines ==
The D offers two Euro 6 engines, the DTI 5 and the DTI 8. The DTI 5 is a 5.1 L inline-four engine with a power output of 157 kW (210 hp) and a torque of 800 N⋅m (590 lb⋅ft) or 179 kW (240 hp) and 900 N⋅m (660 lb⋅ft). The DTI 8 is a 7.7 L straight-six engine with a power output of 186 kW (250 hp) and a torque of 950 N⋅m (700 lb⋅ft); 209 kW (280 hp) and 1,050 N⋅m (770 lb⋅ft) or 239 kW (320 hp) and 1,200 N⋅m (890 lb⋅ft). Both engines includes an EGR system to reduce NOx emissions.

The Renault Trucks D Wide is also available as an all-electric variant, offering 260 kW (349 hp) of continuous power and 370 kW (496 hp) of peak power, and 850 N⋅m (630 lb⋅ft) of torque. Equipped with a 200-kWh battery, it has a range of "up to 200 km", though the vehicle could be presumably equipped with an even larger battery in the future.

The lighter truck of the range, the D Cab 2 m, has an engine different than the rest: a 3L engine with a power output between 112 kW (150 hp) and 134 kW (180 hp).

== Safety ==
Euro NCAP test results Renault Trucks D 4x2 Rigid (2026)
Test	Score
Overall:	4 /5 stars
Safe driving	75%
Crash avoidance	59%
Post crash	80%

Euro NCAP test results Renault Trucks D 4x2 Rigid (2026)
Test	Score
Overall:	4 /5 stars
Safe driving	78%
Crash avoidance	62%
Post crash	80%

== Models ==
The D range includes four models:

- Renault Trucks D (from 10 t to 18 t, 2.1 metres wide cab)
- Renault Trucks D Wide (from 16 t to 26 t, 2.3 metres wide cab)
- Renault Trucks D Access (low entry cab, from 18 t to 26 t)
- Renault Trucks D Cab 2 m (from 3.5 t to 7.5 t, 2 metres wide cab)

=== E-Tech D ===
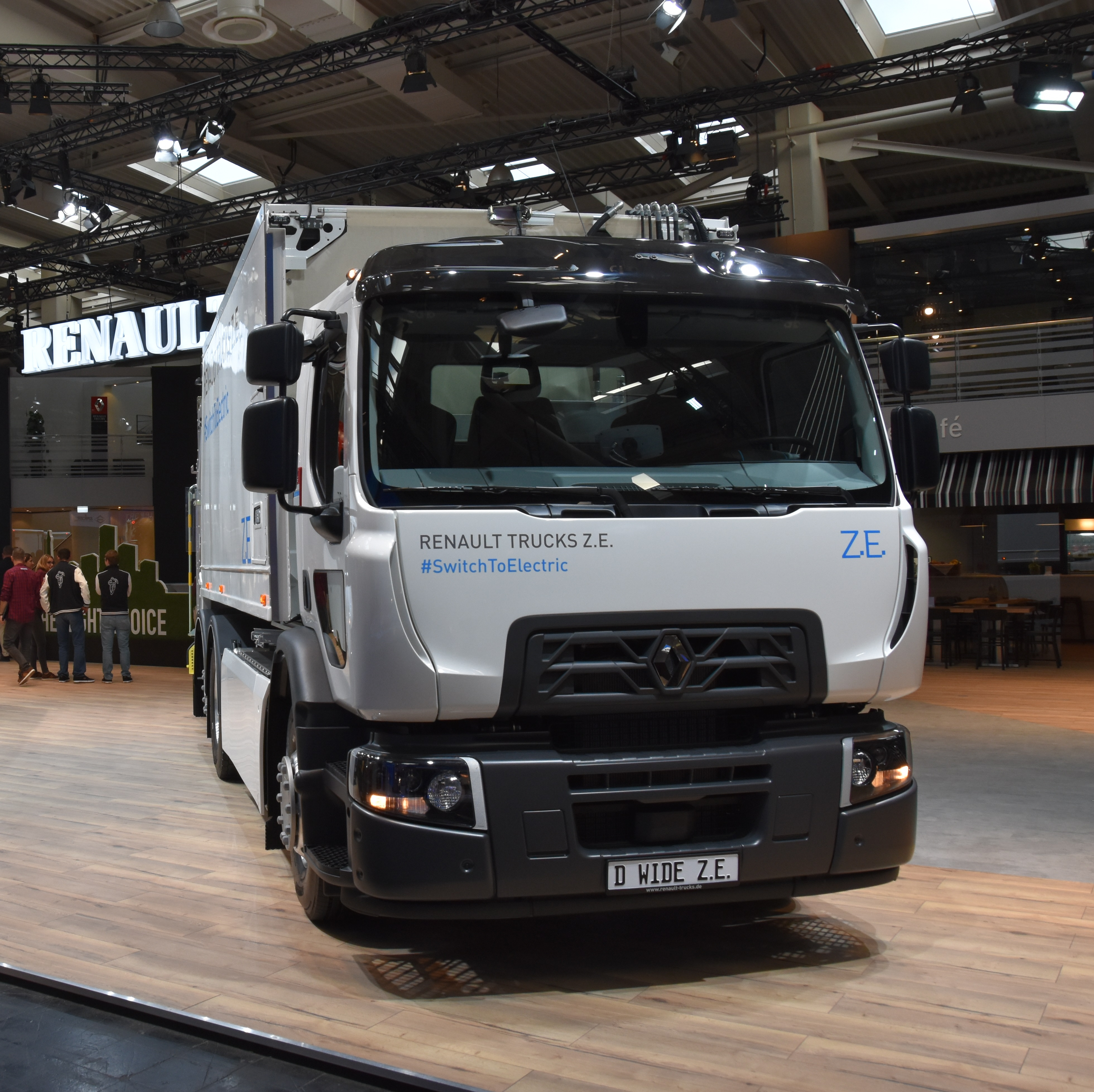
Renault Trucks D Z.E.

In 2022, Renault Trucks launched an electric variant.
