= Eagle Engineering =

English car manufacturer

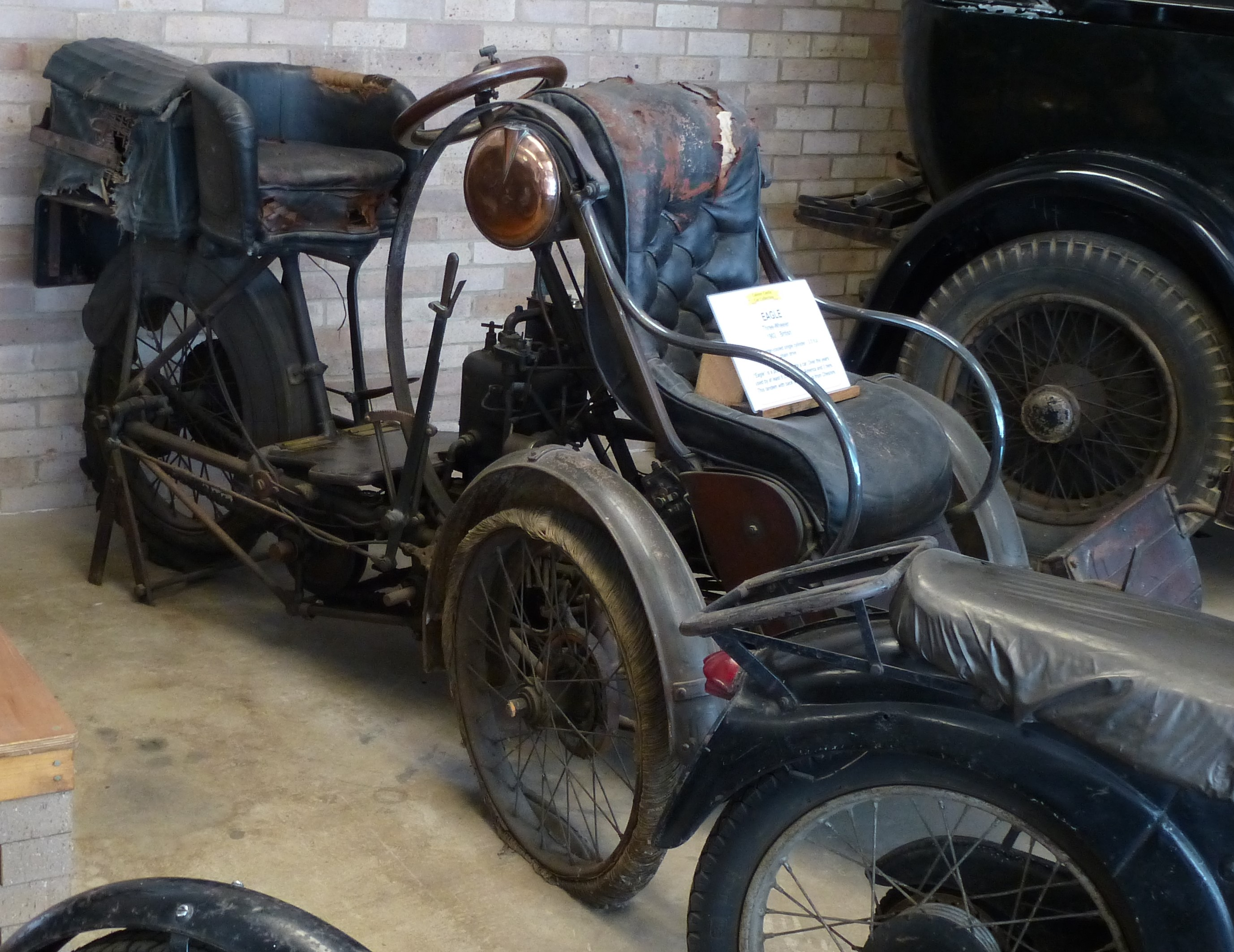
1902 Eagle Tricar

Eagle Engineering & Motor Company Limited was a manufacturer of light cars in Oakfield Road, Altrincham, Cheshire from 1901 to 1907. Its first product had three wheels. In 1903 it began to produce a nine-horsepower. two cylinder car supplanted by a 16-horsepower car which was larger, faster, and more comfortable.
