= Automotive industry in Slovakia =

Since 2007 to 2024, Slovakia has been the world's largest producer of cars per capita, with a total of nearly 1 million cars (993.000) in 2024 (1 080 000 in 2018; 1,001,520 in 2017 and 1,040,000 in 2016) cars manufactured alone in a country with 5 million people. With production of more than a million cars in 2016, Slovakia was 20th in the list of worldwide car production by country and the 7th largest car producer in the European Union. Car manufacture is the largest industry in Slovakia with a share of 12% of the Slovak GDP in 2013 which was 41% of industrial production and 26% of Slovakia's export. 80,000 people were employed in the automotive industry in 2014. 1,500 people were employed when Jaguar Land Rover started production in Nitra in 2018.

== History ==
The "Drndička" was the first automobile to be fully constructed in Slovakia and was constructed by the blacksmith Michal Majer in 1913. He copied a car owned by the Bulgarian King who was, at that time, travelling through Slovakia.

After World War I Slovakia became a part of the newly formed Czechoslovakia. In the Czech part, the industry had been influenced mostly by Germans - see for example the dispute about the design of the Tatra T97 by Hans Ledwinka vs the Volkswagen Beetle design by Ferdinand Porsche, who was also born in Bohemia (now part of the Czech Republic). The long tradition of Czech car production started in 1897, when the first Czech car (Präsident) was produced in the factory in Kopřivnice (Nesselsdorfer Wagenbaufabriksgesellschaft later Tatra), followed by the first lorry in 1898. Škoda Auto (and its predecessors) is the world's fifth oldest company producing cars and has an unbroken history. The first Škoda motorcycle made its debut in 1899 and in 1905 the firm started manufacturing automobiles. Even before World War II the automotive industry was a significant and advanced part of the economy of the former Czechoslovakia.

Post-war socialist Czechoslovakia restored auto manufacturing with the original brands and became the second largest (after Poland) in the Soviet bloc outside the Soviet Union. The Czechoslovak producers Škoda (cars and trolleybuses), Tatra and Avia (which mainly produced trucks and trams), Karosa (buses) Jawa and ČZ (motorcycles) all had their production in the present-day Czech Republic, not in Slovakia.

Companies in Slovakia, including Matador Púchov and VSŽ Košice (steel mills), were supplying parts and components to the Czech part of the republic but later (from 1971) some final production of Škoda cars was also established in Slovakia as Bratislava Automotive Works (BAZ) and Trnava Automotive Works (TAZ). Some Tatra car production was also moved to Banovce nad Bebravou.

However, following the dissolution of Czechoslovakia in 1993, the Czech Republic inherited most of its auto production capabilities and since then has grown fast through foreign investment. Although Volkswagen bought Škoda's production sites in Slovakia in 1991, it gained full control only in 1999 when Volkswagen Slovakia was established, which was the real beginning of the rapid development of the auto-industry in Slovakia.

The truck manufacturing company Tanax Trucks was established in 2000 in Bánovce nad Bebravou, as a successor to the town's established Tatra truck factory. Several bus manufacturing companies emerged during the 1990s, including Novoplan in Lučenec (active from 1996 until 2019), Granus in Zvolen (1997–2003), originally a local division of the LIAZ company, as well as the company SlovBus in Nové Mesto nad Váhom and Detva (1997–2011). Currently active bus manufacturers are Troliga Bus in Levoča, which began bus design and production in 2009, and inherited some of the assets from its former collaborator, the defunct Novoplan company, and Rošero Spišská Nová Ves.

== Manufacturers ==
Slovakia is one of the significant European (7th) and World's (20th) automakers, having an annual output of more than 1 million and exports to more than 100 countries. Passenger car manufacturers in Slovakia currently include 4 automobile production plants: Volkswagen Slovakia in Bratislava, Stellantis in Trnava and Kia Motors' Žilina Plant and Jaguar Land Rover in Nitra. There are many other tier suppliers.

Domestically owned automotive manufacturers specializing in smaller volume serial production include Tanax Trucks in Bánovce nad Bebravou (focused primarily on military trucks for armed forces contracts) and Troliga Bus in Levoča (focused on urban transit and intercity buses and coaches). The small independent company K-1 Engineering specializes in hand-crafted concept sportscars, their K-1 Attack model.

The company Way Industries a.s. (Inc.), headquartered in Krupina, focuses on the design and manufacturing of construction vehicles (Locust brand loaders and small excavators) and military engineering vehicles (Božena mine-flails and other unmanned remote-controlled vehicles), for the domestic market and exports to the pan-European market.

== Current manufacturers and models ==
=== Volkswagen Bratislava Plant ===
Volkswagen up! (2011-2023)

Volkswagen Touareg (2002-2026)

Volkswagen Polo (1999-2007)

Volkswagen Golf (1994-2005)

Volkswagen Bora

Volkswagen Passat (2023-Present)

Škoda Citigo (2011-2020)

Škoda Octavia (2008-2010)

Škoda Superb (2023-Present)

Škoda Karoq (2020-2023)

SEAT Mii (2011-2021)

SEAT Ibiza (6L) (2003-2005)

Audi Q7 (2005-Present)

Audi Q8 (2018-Present)

Porsche Cayenne (2002-Present)

Porsche Cayenne Coupé (2019-Present)

=== Stellantis Trnava Plant ===
Peugeot 207

Peugeot 208 I.

Peugeot 208 II.

Peugeot e-208

Citroën C3 Picasso

Citroën C3 III.

=== Kia Motors Žilina Plant ===
Kia Cee'd

Kia Venga

Kia Sportage

Kia EV4

=== Jaguar Land Rover Slovakia Nitra plant ===
Land Rover Discovery

Land Rover Defender

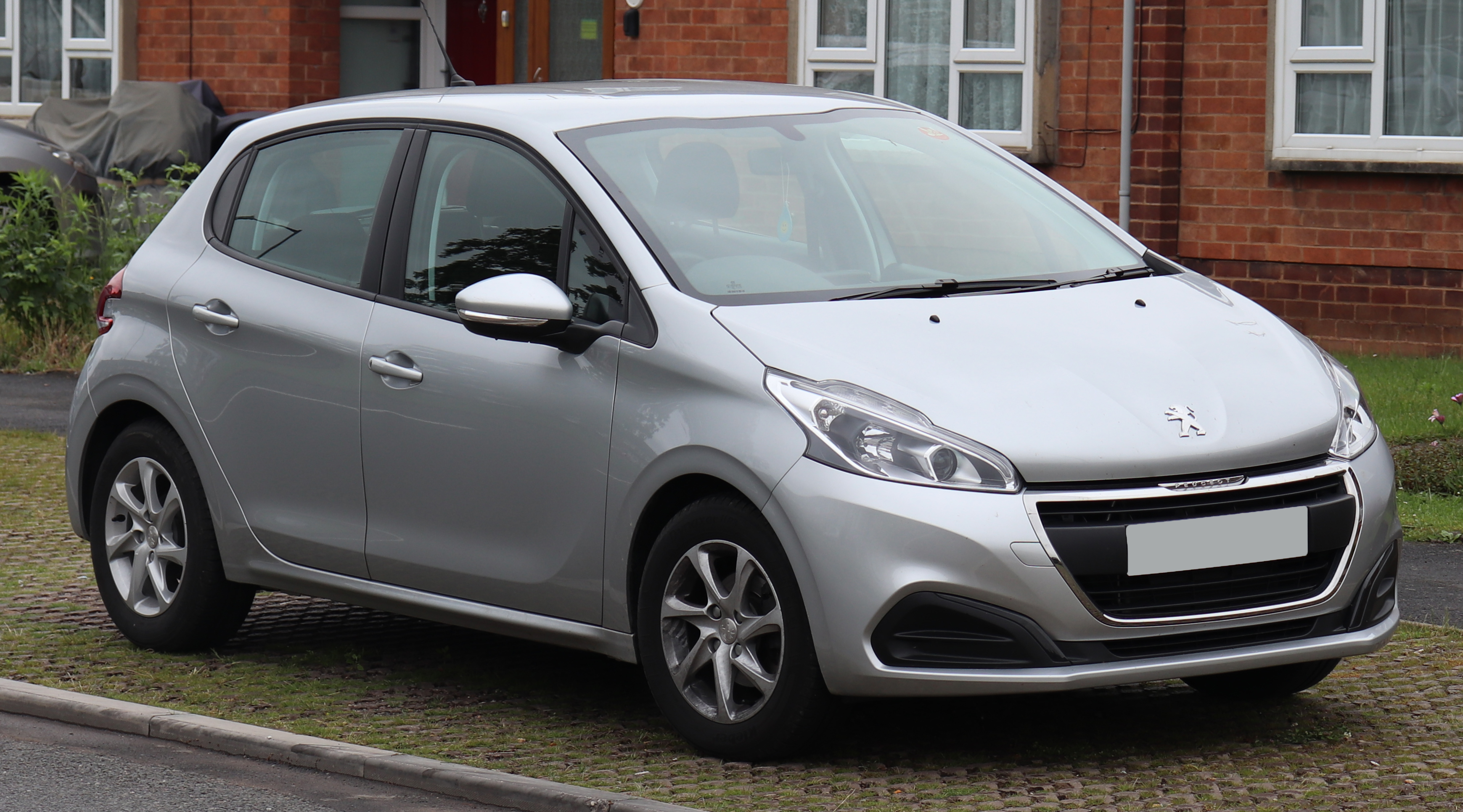
Peugeot 208 produced by PSA Peugeot Citroën in Trnava

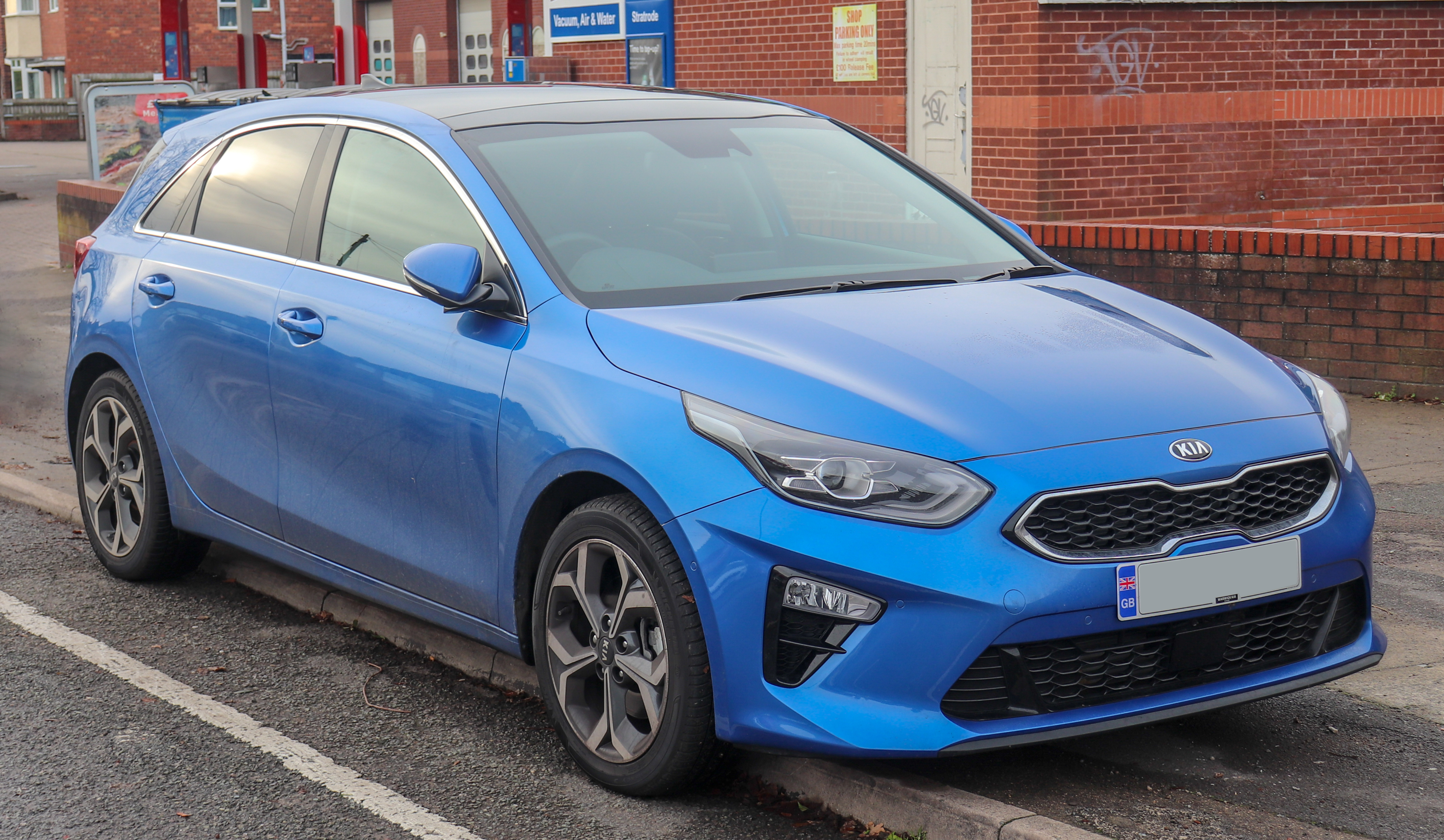
Kia Cee'd produced at Kia's Žilina plant

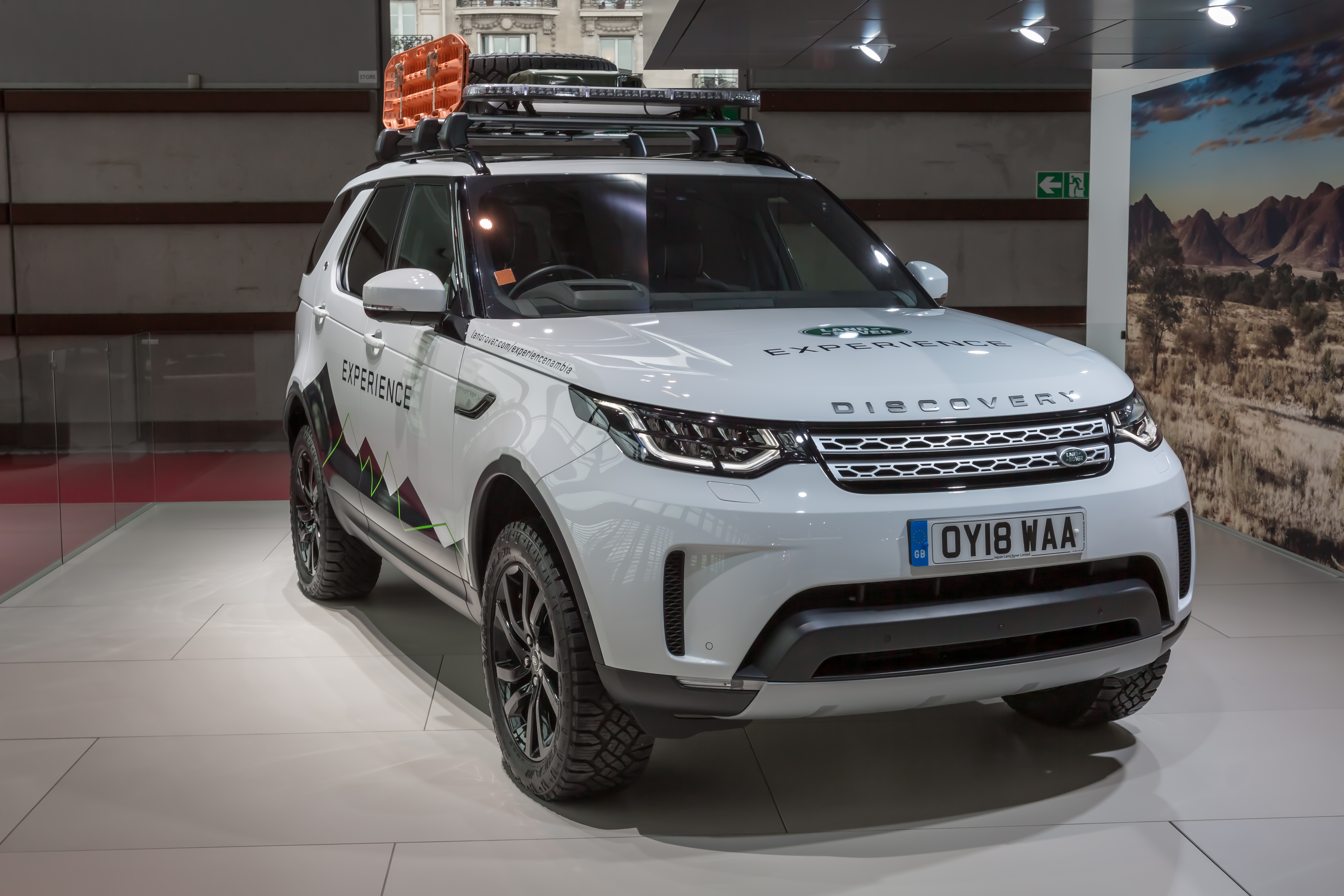
Land Rover Discovery, a model produced at the Jaguar Land Rover plant in Nitra

=== Troliga Bus Levoča plant ===
City buses: Leonis, Leonis Electric, Sirius, Scorpius

Intercity buses: Pegasus, Fenix, Fenix CNG, Taurus

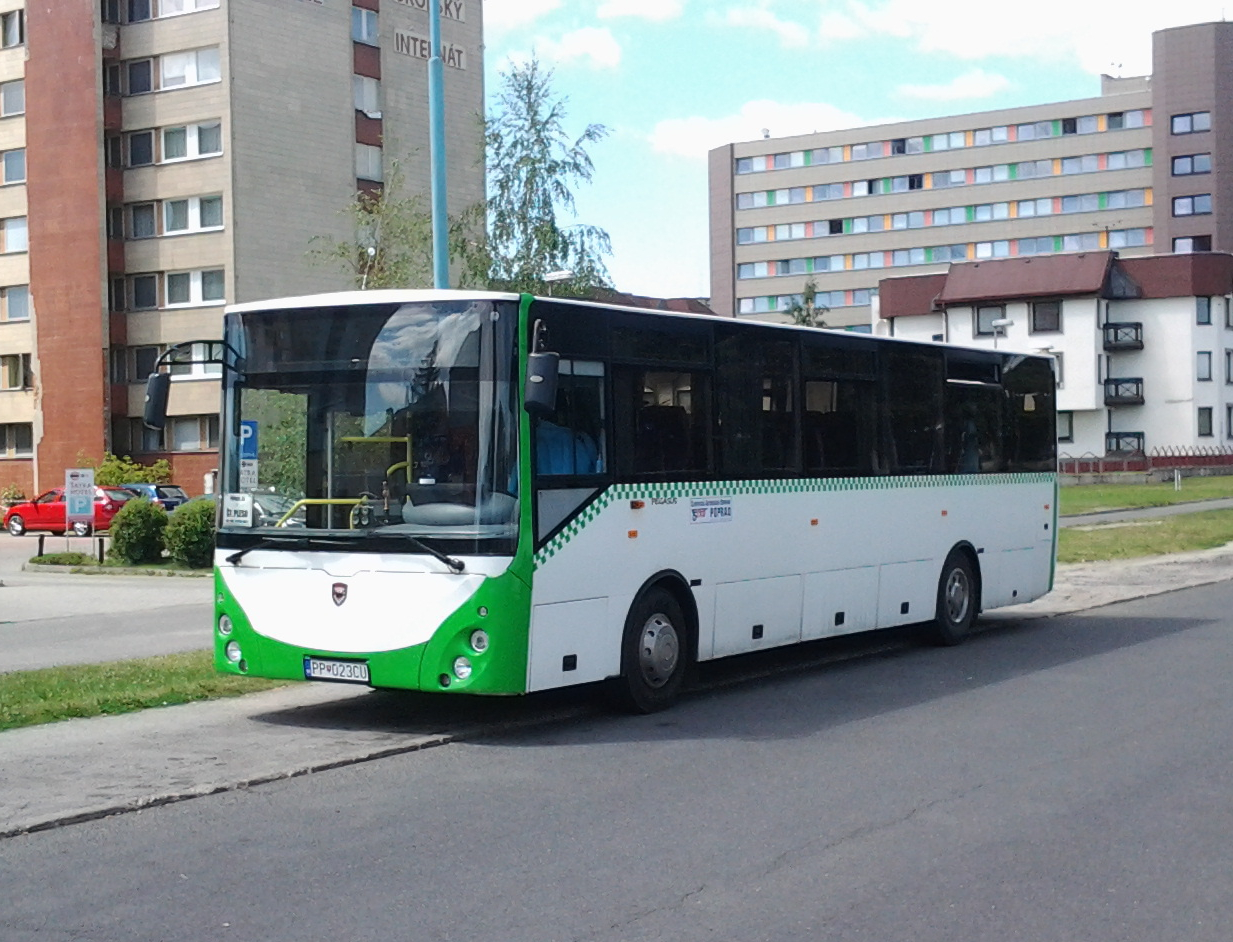
Troliga Bus Pegasus, an intercity coach model

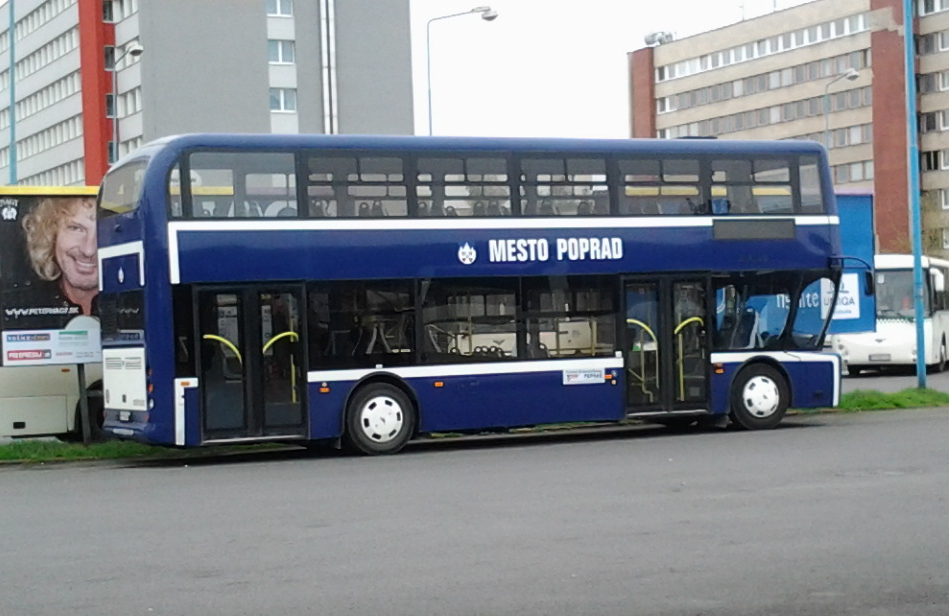
Troliga Bus Sirius, a domestic double-decker bus design

== Future manufacturing projects ==
Volvo Cars has invested 1.2 billion euros (1.25 billion USD) in a new plant which is set to start construction in 2023, for opening in 2026. In 2024 the European Commission approved state aid of €267 million from the Slovak government to support construction of the plant. In 2025, while the plant was still under construction, Volvo Cars announced the manufacturing start date to be delayed to 2027, with Polestar signing a memorandum of understanding with Volvo Cars to have Polestar 7 manufactured in the new plant.

== Defunct manufacturers ==
=== Passenger cars and vans ===
- Bratislava Automotive Works (BAZ), Bratislava (1971–1998)
- Trnava Automotive Works (TAZ), Trnava (1973–1999)
- K-1 Engineering, Bratislava, model K-1 Attack

=== Buses ===
- Novoplan, Lučenec (1996–2019)
- Granus, part of LIAZ Zvolen (1997–2003)
- SlovBus, Nové Mesto nad Váhom, Detva (1997–2011)
