= Ocelot (disambiguation) =

An ocelot is a species of South and Central American feline, Leopardus pardalis.

Ocelot may also refer to:

== Military ==
- Ocelot (vehicle), military armoured vehicle
- HMS Ocelot, Royal Navy submarine
- USS Ocelot (IX-110), flagship of ServRon 10 in 1944

== Other ==
- Revolver Ocelot, a character in the Metal Gear Solid video game franchise
- Michel Ocelot, French filmmaker
- Ocelot (musician), American DJ
- Oneiric Ocelot, a version of Ubuntu (computer operating system)
- Ocelot Auto, a small Czech auto manufacturer
- Ocelot, a single on Joy (Phish album) (2009)
- The Ocelot, fictional comic character created by Ron Wilbur of Eros Comix

== See also ==
- Ocelotl
