= Škoda 1203 =

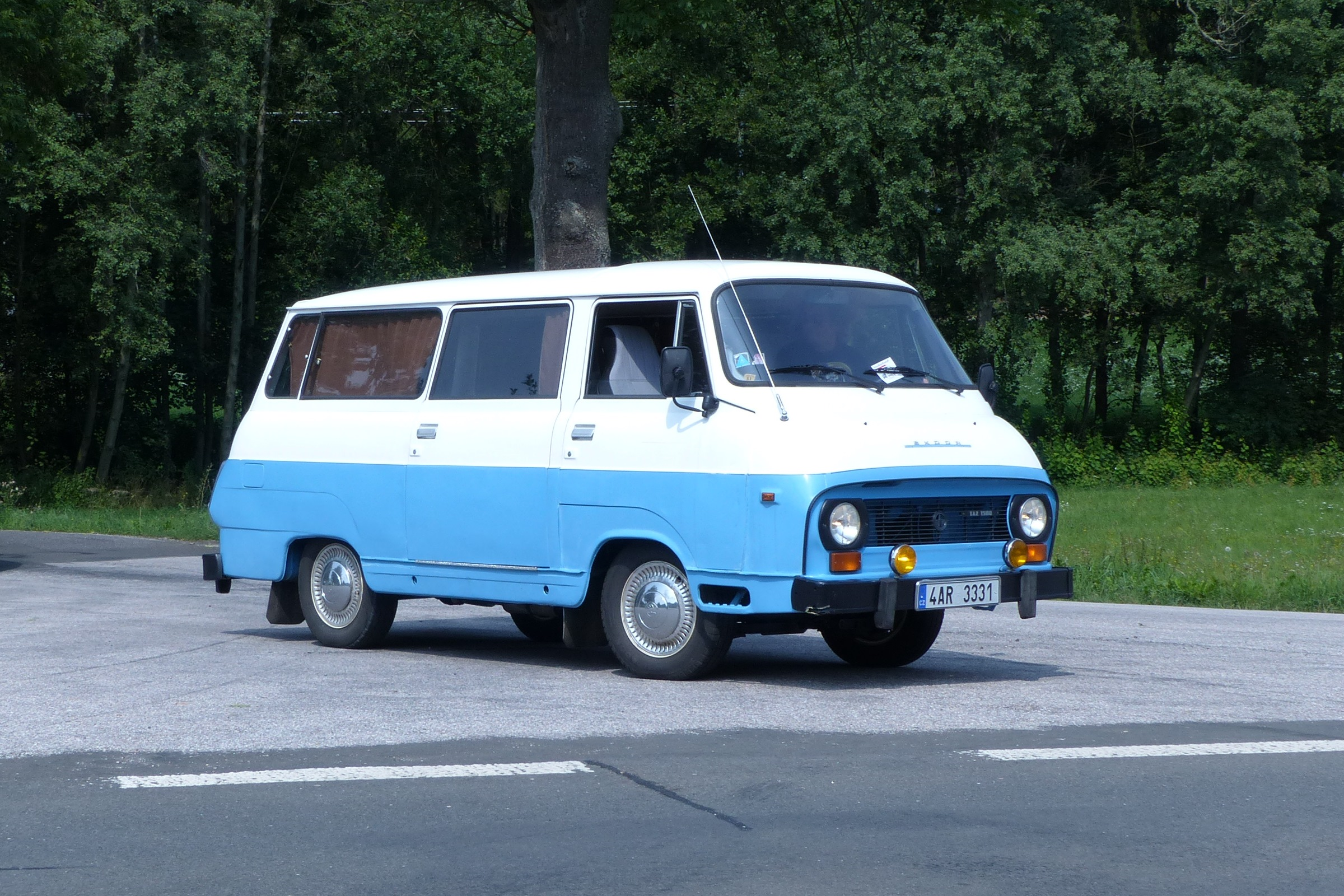

Overview
- Type: Van
- Manufacturer: AZNP (1968–1982); TAZ Trnava (1981–1997); Roman Jirouš – OCELOT Žacléř (1994–2017)
- Also called: TAZ 1500, TAZ 1203, Škoda TAZ 1203
- Production: 1968–1997 (mass production); 1994–2017 (small-scale production)
- Designer: Miloš Krejčíř

Body and chassis
- Layout: FR layout
- Doors: 4

Powertrain
- Engine: 1.2 L I4
- Power output: 47 PS (35 kW) at 4600 min−1
- Transmission: 4-speed, 2. to 4. synchronized (since 1986 also 5-speed)
- Electric range: 12 Volt, alternator 300 watt, battery 50 Ah

Dimensions
- Wheelbase: 2,320 mm (91.3 in)
- Length: 4,520 mm (178.0 in)
- Width: 1,800 mm (70.9 in)
- Height: 1,900 mm (74.8 in)
- Curb weight: 1,130–1,280 kg (2,491–2,822 lb)

The Škoda 1203, Škoda 1203 M, TAZ-Š 1203 and TAZ 1500 were the only Czech/Czechoslovak van cars ever produced. They were manufactured from 1968 to 1981 in Vrchlabí by AZV Škoda (typ 997). Five years later, production of the modernized type began (typ 776) and part of the production was moved to Trnava (TAZ). In 1981, the entire production was moved to Trnava (Škoda TAZ). In 1985, another modernization came (TAZ 1500) and the 1,433 cm³ engine appeared. The vehicle was also manufactured in small-scale production in 1994–2010 by Ocelot Auto in Žacléř. Around 70,000 cars were produced.

The first plans for production were drawn up in 1956. Inability to secure suppliers of parts and accessories in Czechoslovakia were the reason the production was delayed until 1968. The Škoda 1202 serves as the technical basis of the vehicle. There were several modifications during the production run, most of which had to do with the engine. The Škoda 1203 lasted for over thirty years without major structural interventions in production, and contributed significantly to the development of small businesses after 1989.

== Gallery ==
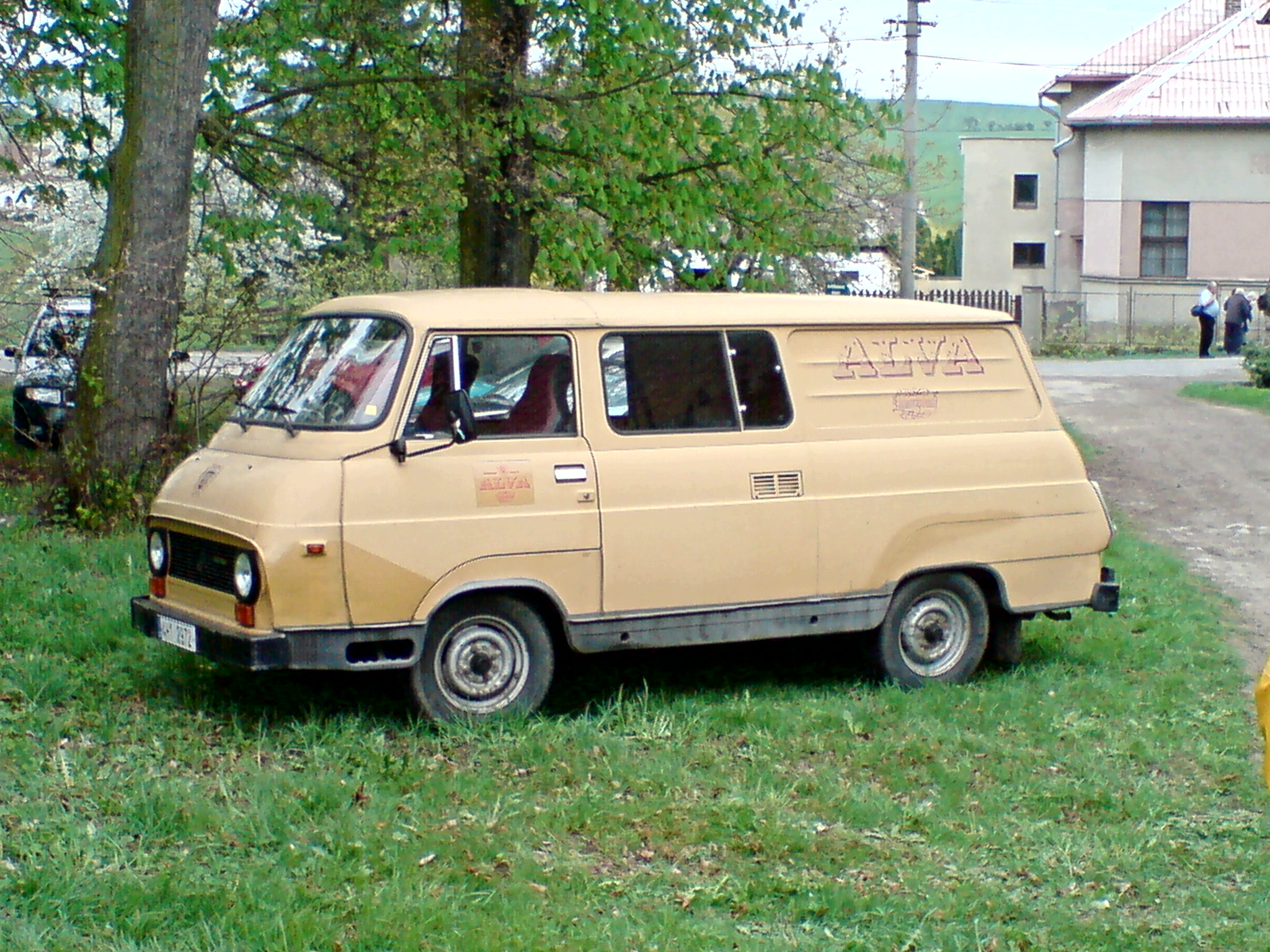
Škoda 1203

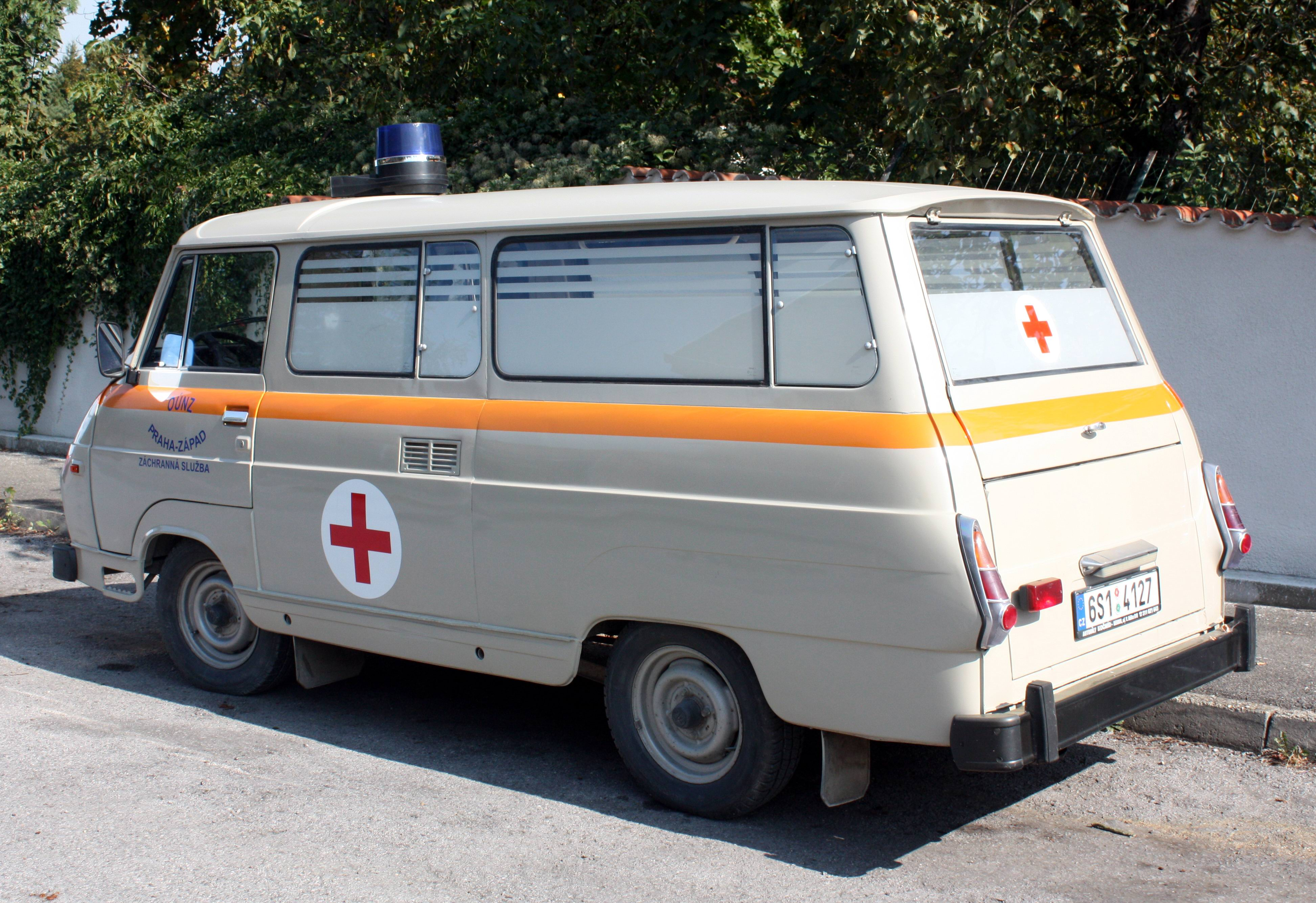
Škoda 1203 was the most frequently used ambulance in Czechoslovakia

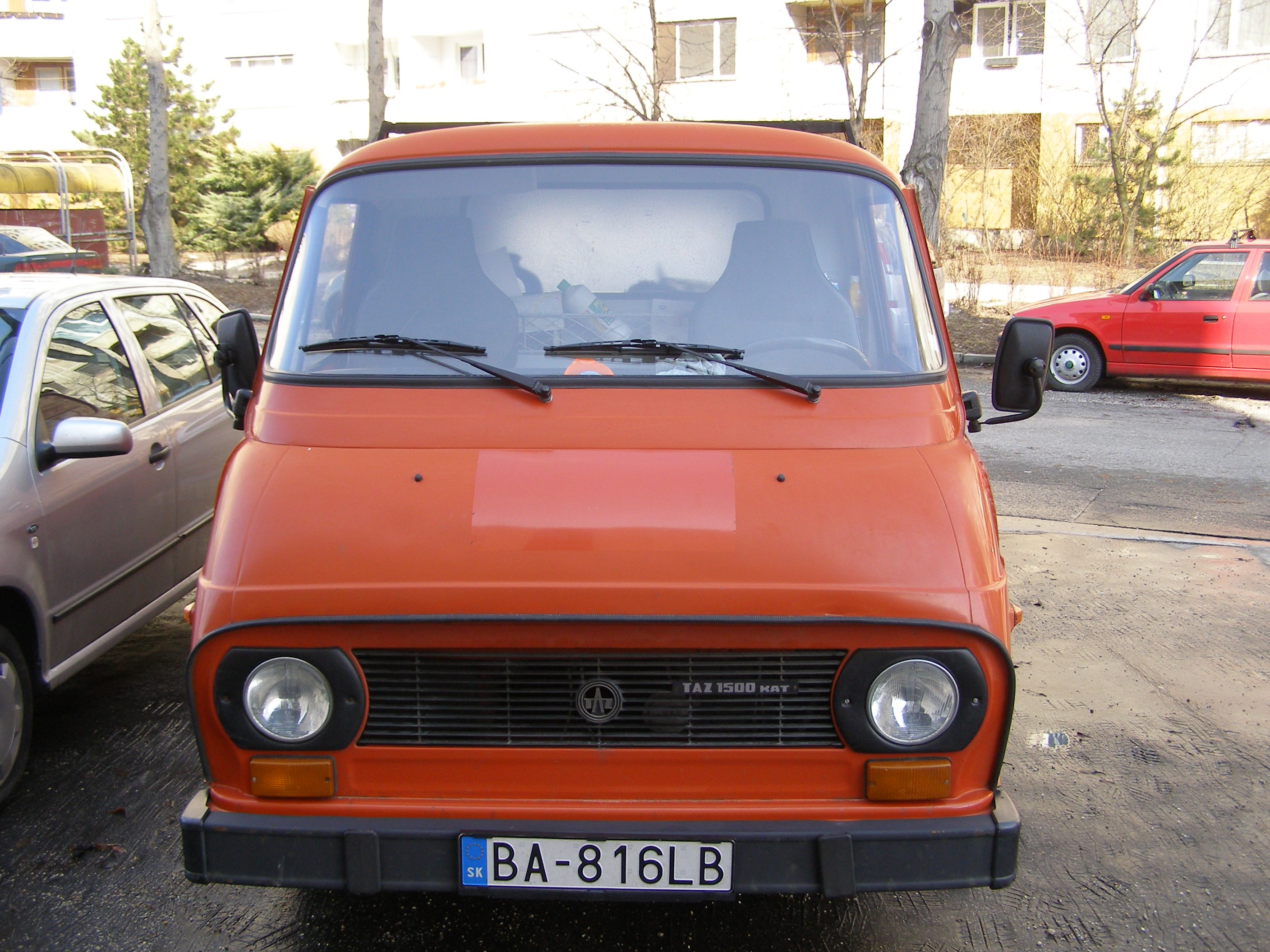
TAZ 1500 KAT Van

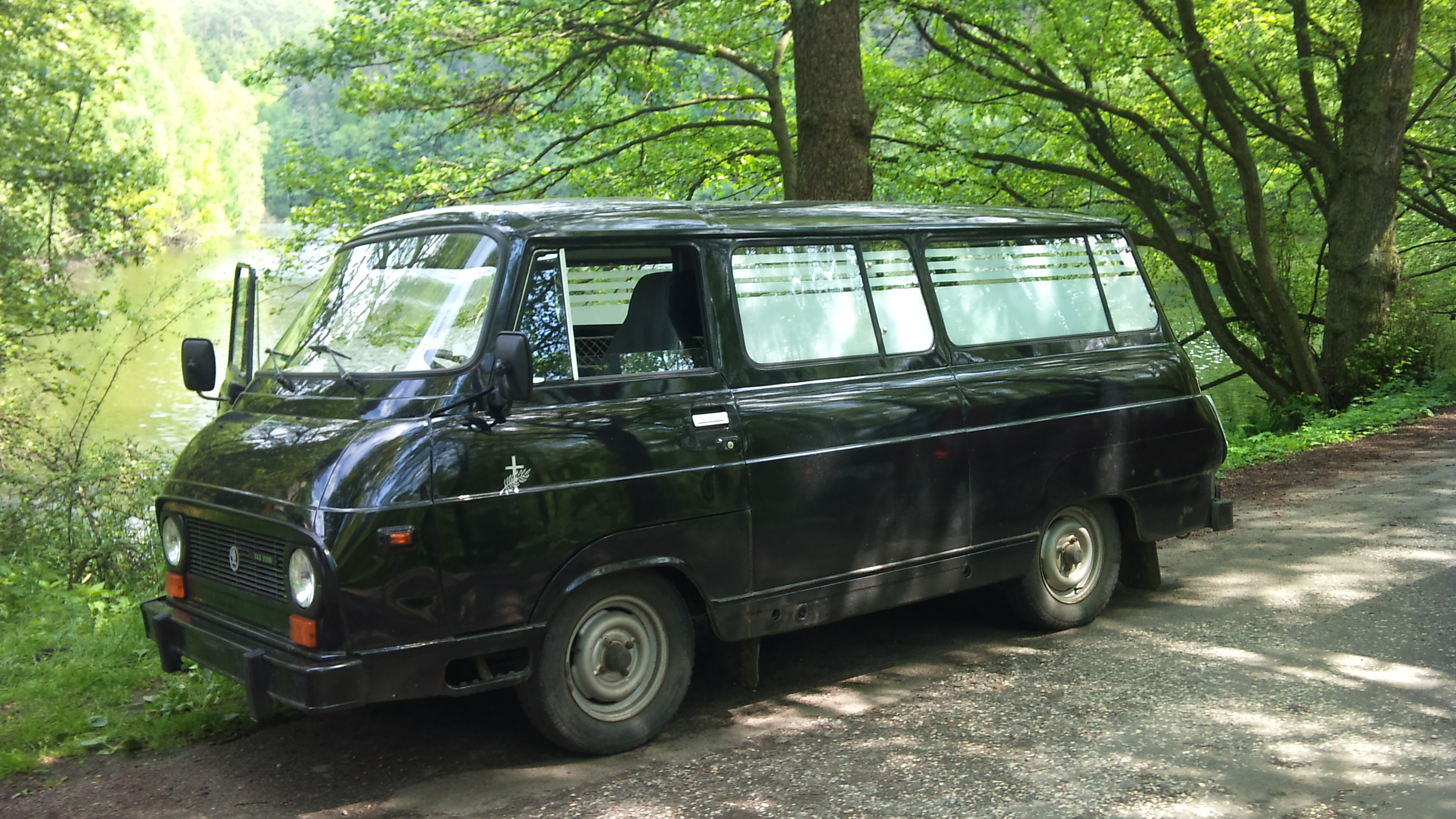
TAZ 1500 as funeral car

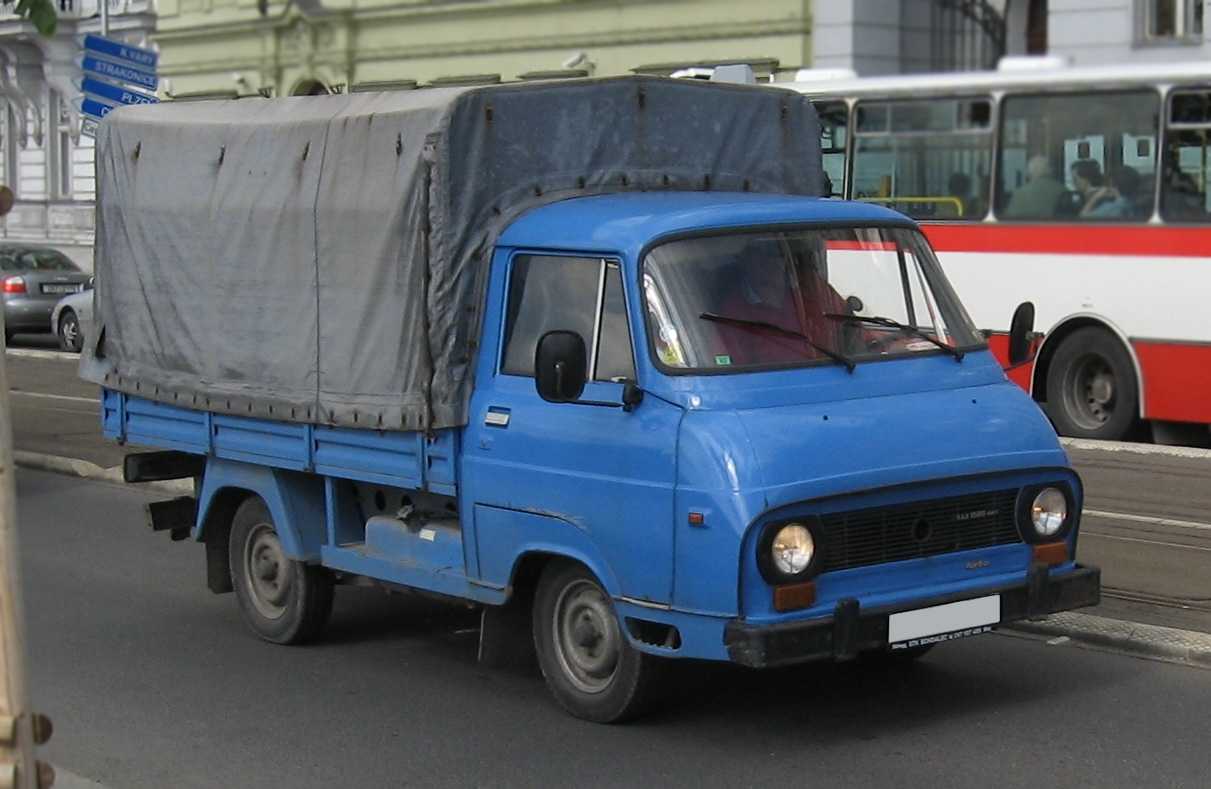
TAZ 1500 KAT Rol

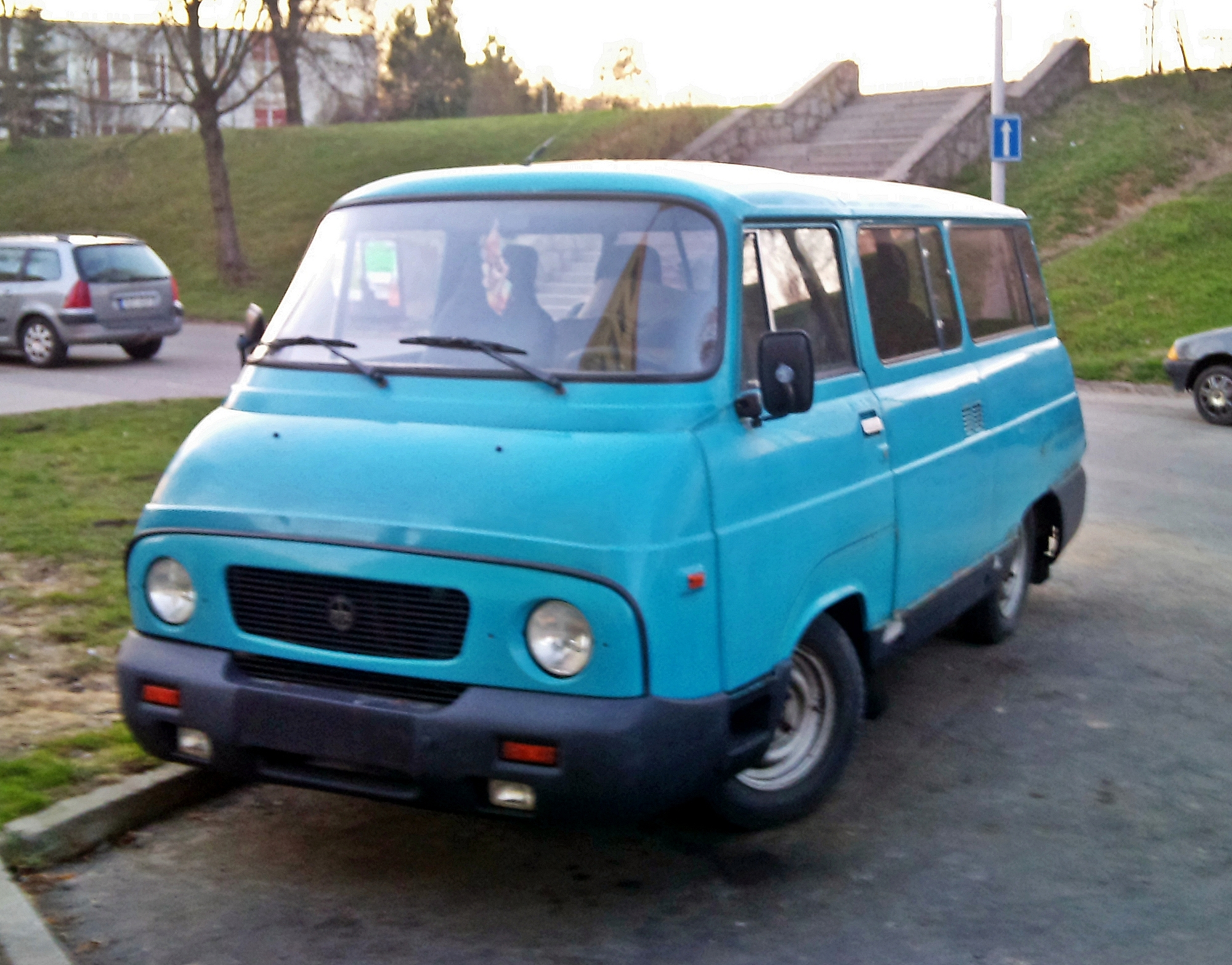
TAZ 1500 latest version

== Specifications ==
Type	Škoda 1203	Škoda 1203 M, TAZ-Š 1203	TAZ 1500
Engine	water-cooled four-cylinder inline OHV petrol engine, cast iron front longitudinally mounted, firing order 1-3-4-2		
Power	47 PS (35 kW) at 4600 min^{−1}		57 PS (42 kW) at 4500 min^{−1}
Cubic capacity	1221 cc		1433 cc
Bore × stroke	72 × 75 mm		72 × 88 cm
Carburetor	Two-chamber Carburetor Jikov 32 BS-14 (since 1974)		Two-chamber Carburetor Jikov 32 SEDR
Torque at 1/min	88 Nm at 3000 4600 min^{−1}		105 Nm at 2500 4600 min^{−1}
Transmission	4-speed, 2. to 4. synchronized (since 1986 also 5-speed)		5-speed
clutch	dry, single		
Top speed	90–95 km/h (56–59 mph)		110–115 km/h (68–71 mph)
acceleration 0–80 km/h (50 mph)	40 s		30,23 s
tank capacity	40 l		
consumption at 60 km/h (37 mph)	ca. 10–12-liter/100 km		
Electrical	12 Volt, alternator 300 watt, battery 50 Ah		
Body	self-supporting all-steel		
Front axle	Gauge 1360 mm		
Brakes front	Drum brakes (since 1986 disc brakes)		
Rear axle	Gauge 1350 mm		
Brakes back	Drum brakes		
Tires	6,40 – 15 „Extra Transport“		
Turn radius	10 m		
Wheelbase	2320 mm		
Length × wide × height	4520 × 1800 × 1900 mm		
Empty weight	1,130–1,280 kg (2,491–2,822 lb)		
construction period	1968–1985		1981–1999

== Literature ==
- Jan Králík (January 2010), Škoda 1203 (in German), Grada Publishing, ISBN 978-80-247-3383-8
- Jan Tuček (30 April 2009), Auta východního bloku (in German), Grada Publishing, pp. 88 f, ISBN 978-80-247-2585-7
