= K-1 Attack =

Slovak super car by K-1 Engineering

K-1 Attack Roadster
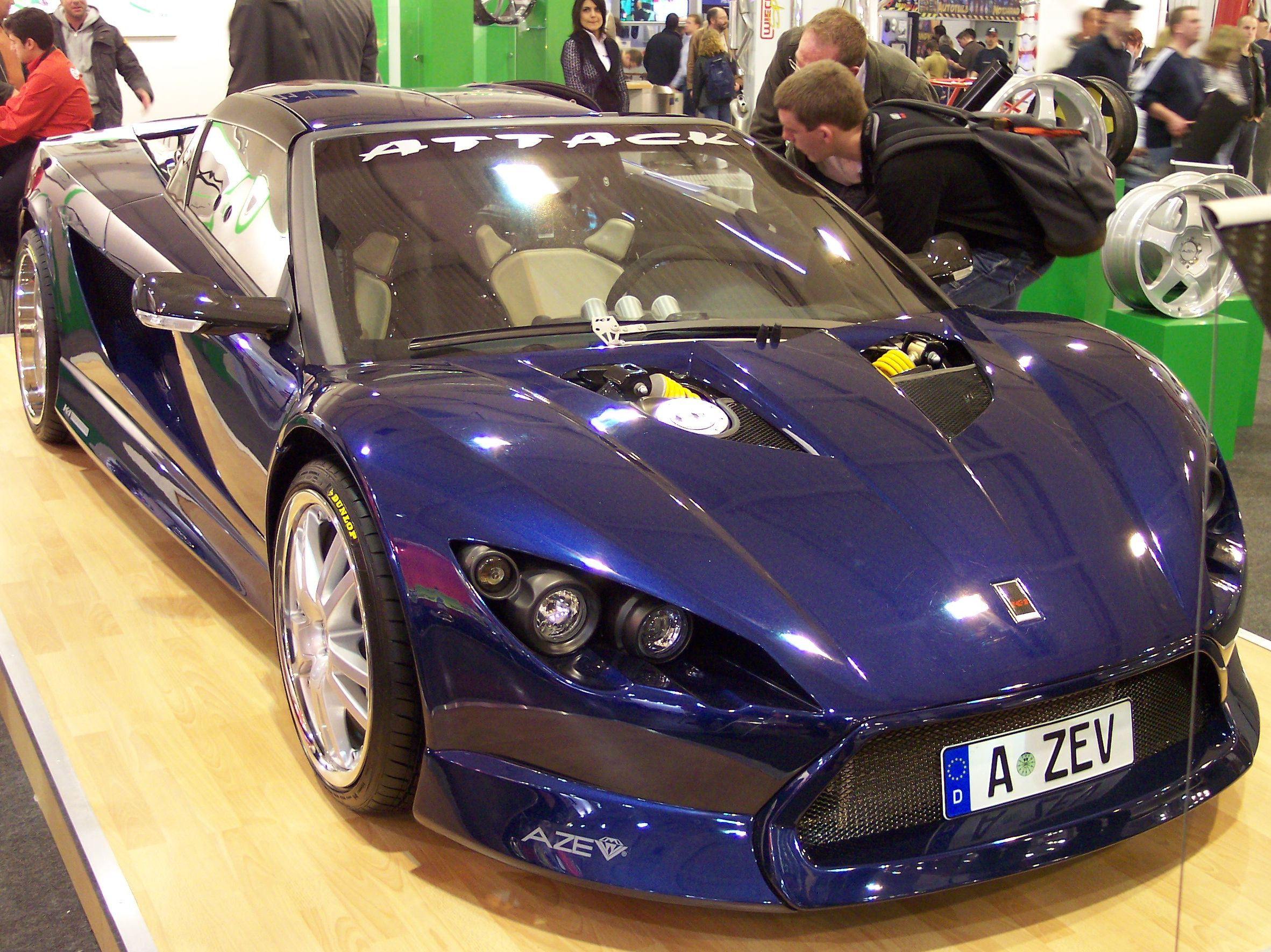

Overview
- Manufacturer: K-1 Engineering
- Production: 2002–present
- Assembly: Bratislava, Slovakia
- Designer: Juraj Mitro

Body and chassis
- Class: Sports car
- Body style: 2-seat roadster
- Layout: Rear mid-engine, rear-wheel-drive

Powertrain
- Engine: Ford ST220 3.0 L V6 (biturbo for racing)
- Transmission: 6-speed manual

Dimensions
- Wheelbase: 2,440 mm (96.1 in)
- Length: 4,040 mm (159.1 in)
- Width: 1,860 mm (73.2 in)
- Height: 1,095 mm (43.1 in)
- Curb weight: 992 kg (2,187 lb)

The K-1 Attack Roadster is a sports car built by the Slovak car company K-1 Engineering. The cars are manufactured by hand in Bratislava. The Attack was officially launched in May 2002, but was in development since 1999. The car was originally made for racing, developed by Engineer Dick Kvetnansky and designed by Juraj Mitro and was completed in 2000. The car was built initially as a race car, upon seeing the demand as a road car the car was made available as a kit car using the 90–93 Honda Accord as the donor car. Small modifications could be made to accommodate the H22 engine from the Honda Prelude as well.

== History ==
In May 2002, K-1 Engineering presented the Attack Roadster at the Frankfurt Motor Show (International Automobile Exhibition). Powered by a mid-mounted 3.0-litre (2,967 cc) V-6 Ford ST220 engine, producing 178 kW at 7,000 rpm, mated to a 6-speed manual transmission with a rear-wheel drive powertrain. The Attack could accelerate from 0–100 km/h in 5.2 seconds. Top speed was electronically limited to 250 km/h.

In 2003, a K-1 Attack was donated by Richard Kvetnansky to a development team of high school students in the west Philadelphia Learning Academy and was the only Attack with a full carbon fibre body. The team of students was led by the teacher-engineer Simon Hauger, their goal was to build "The World's First Hybrid Supercar". In 2004, the project was completed and won an International fuel efficiency competition in 2005, beating large car manufacturers like Honda, Toyota, and Tesla.

In 2006, it competed again and won, sweeping the competition. The car was capable of a 0–100 km/h (62 mph) time of 3.5 seconds, and gave a fuel economy of up to 24 km/L. The rear wheels of the car were powered by a Volkswagen GTI diesel engine that was modified to run on soybean oil and there were plans to power the front wheels by an alternating current propulsion electric motor and then later by an azure motor, but was never effectuated. The car was not only fast and economical, but also ecologically-friendly, thereby achieving its goal. According to the fuel efficiency competition, the car was given a wide media coverage by TV channels like the Discovery Channel, ABC, NBC, CABLE TV, and various car magazines.

Somewhere between twenty and forty were produced and exported to the United States by K-1 Engineering before production ceased. The kit was plagued by poor support, lack of assembly instructions and an extremely difficult build process due to ill-conceived design aspects. In 2011, B-Racing was born and gained the rights and tooling to begin manufacturing again. Since then many improvements, refinements, and available upgrades have been made including several options for using different donor cars. Pricing has also been reduced from the original £16,200 to £8,100.

== Gallery ==
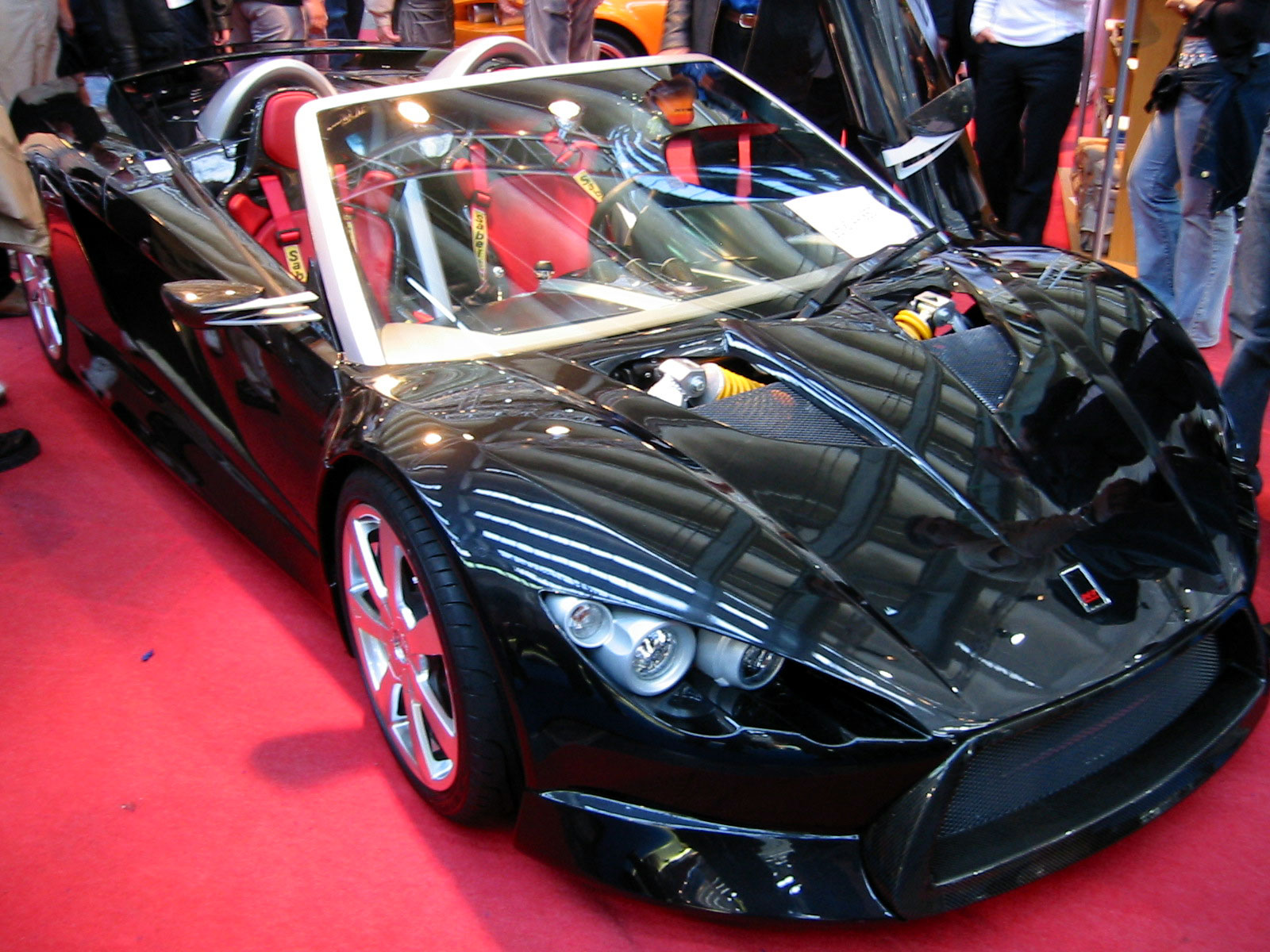
K1 Attack at the IAA 2003

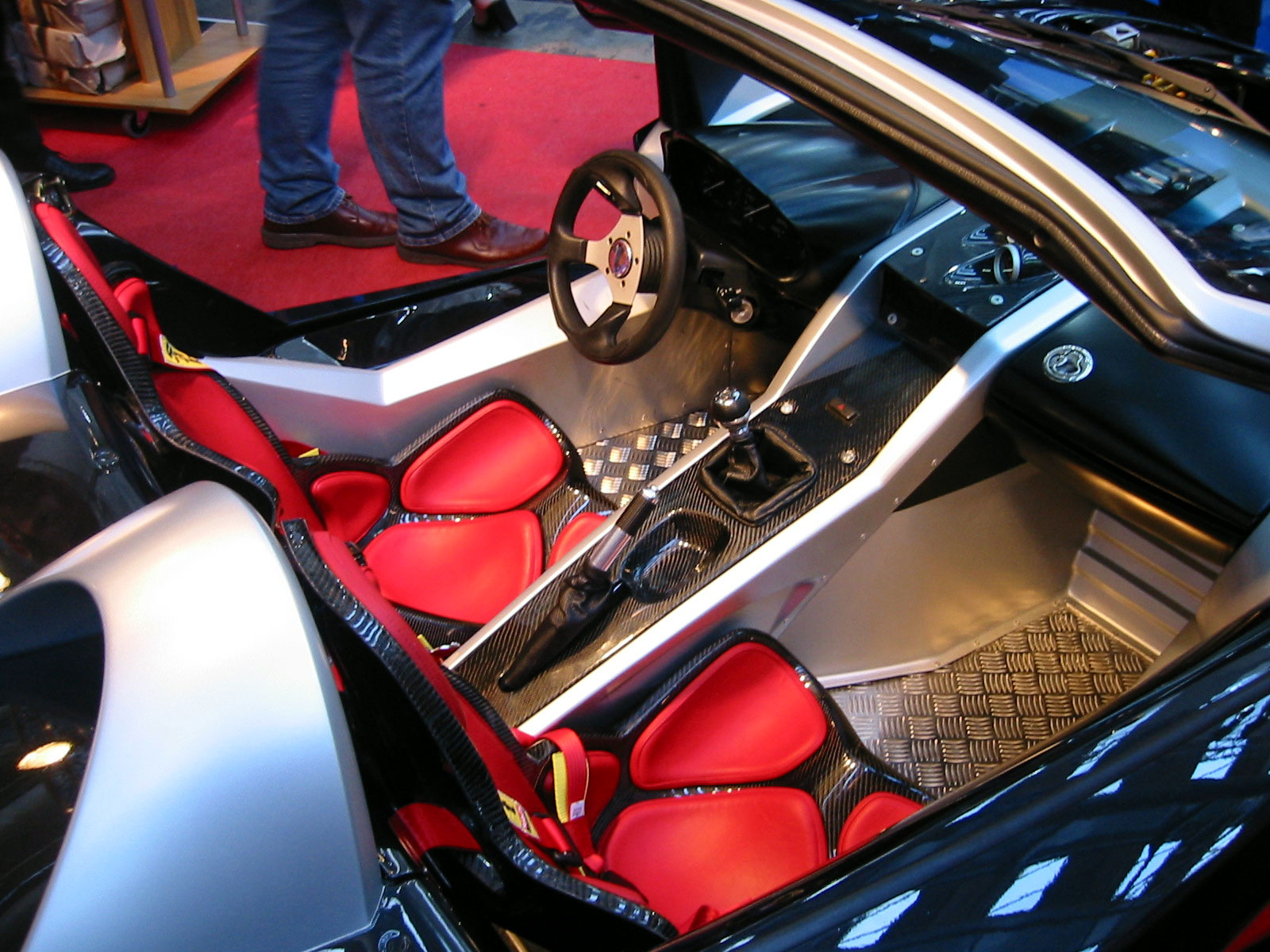
Attack cockpit

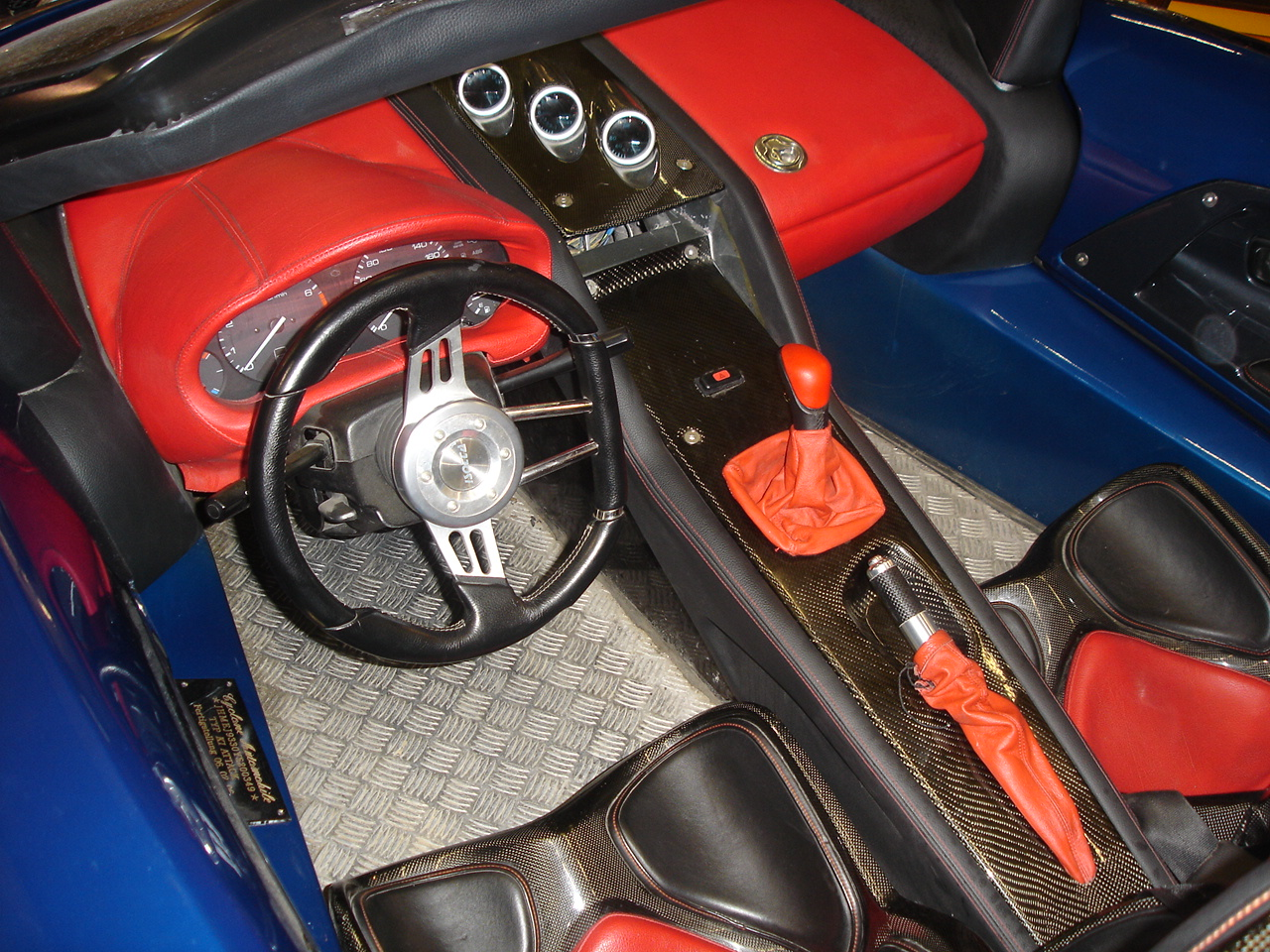
Attack cockpit 2

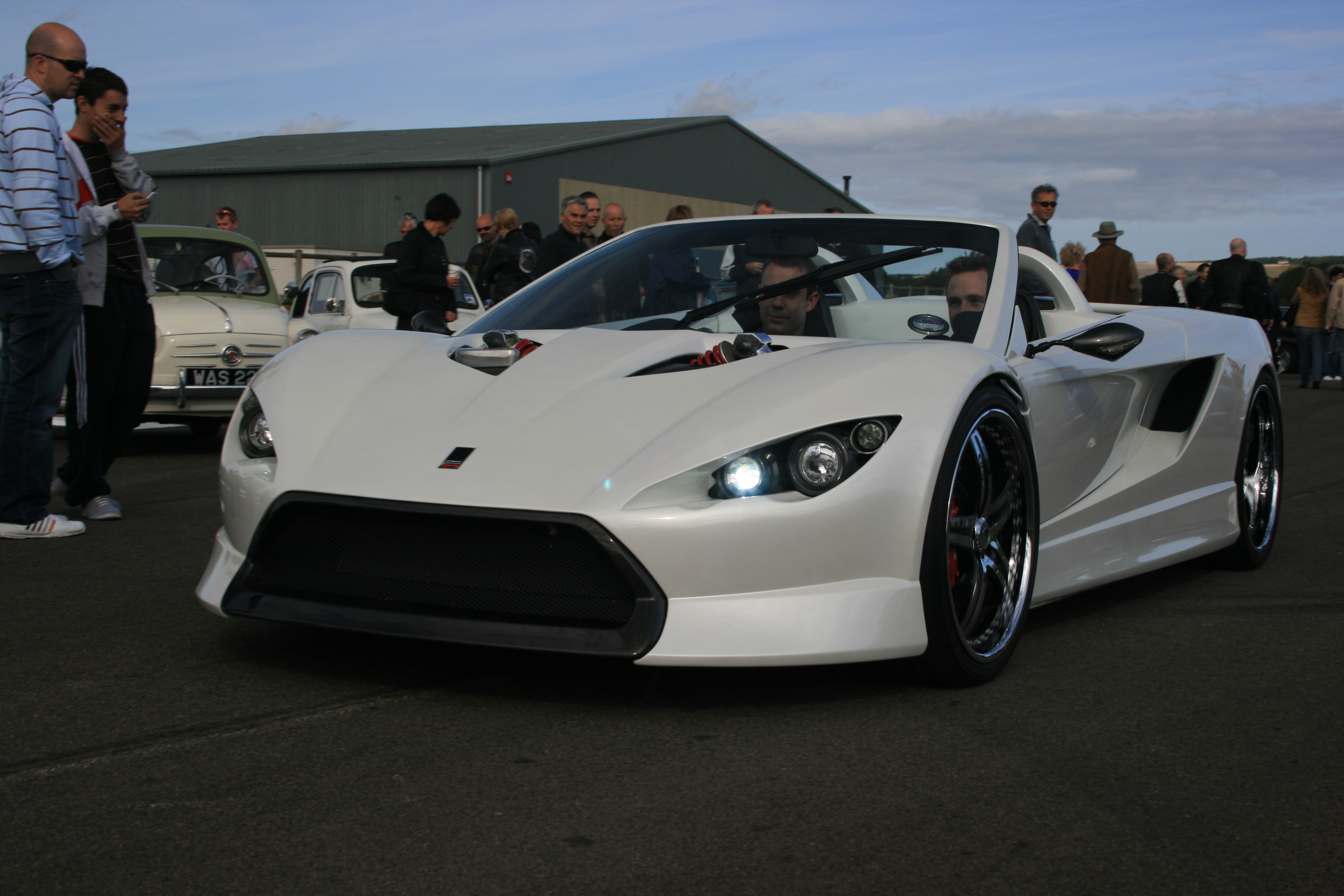
K1 Attack

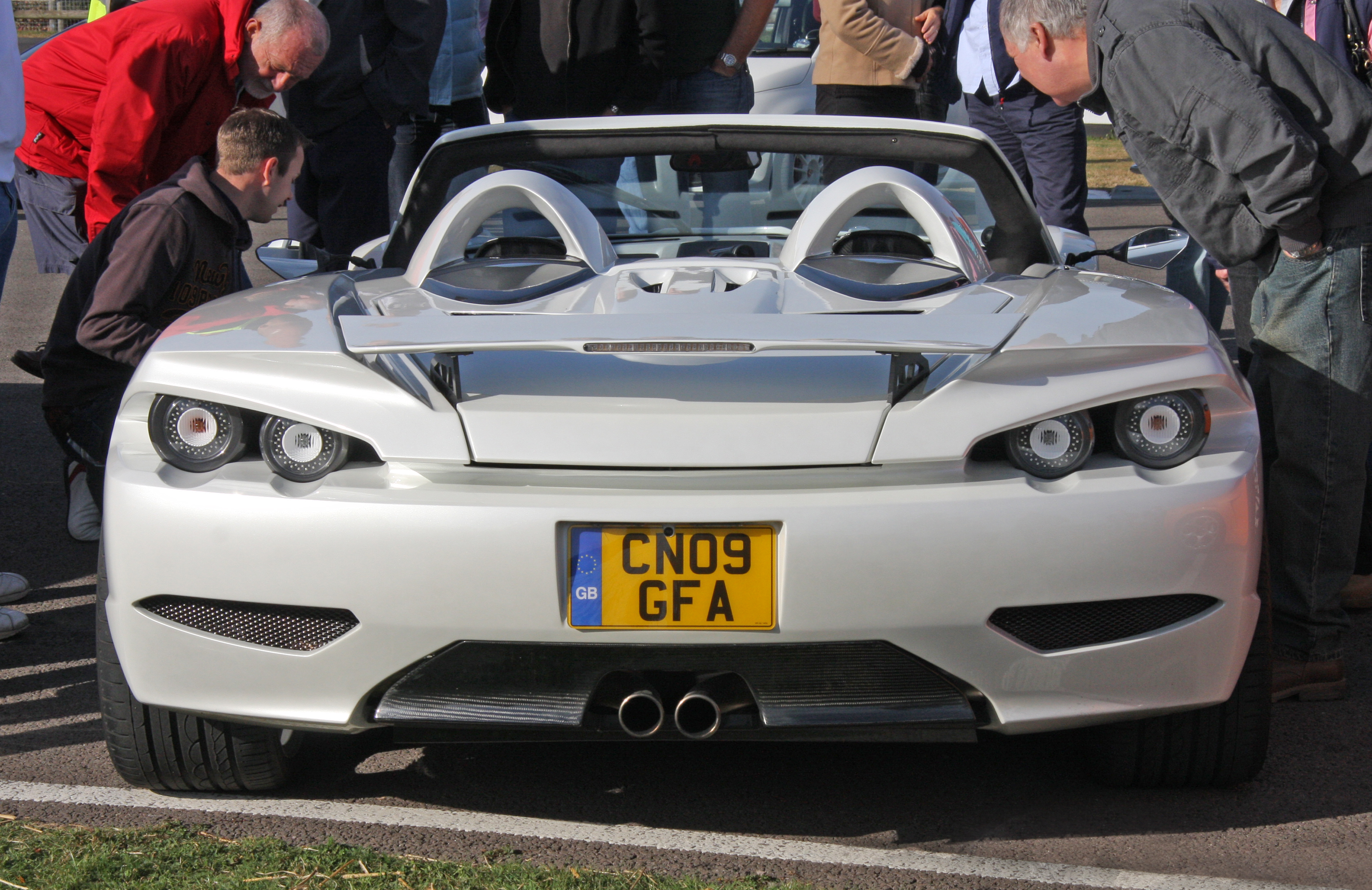
Attack back-view

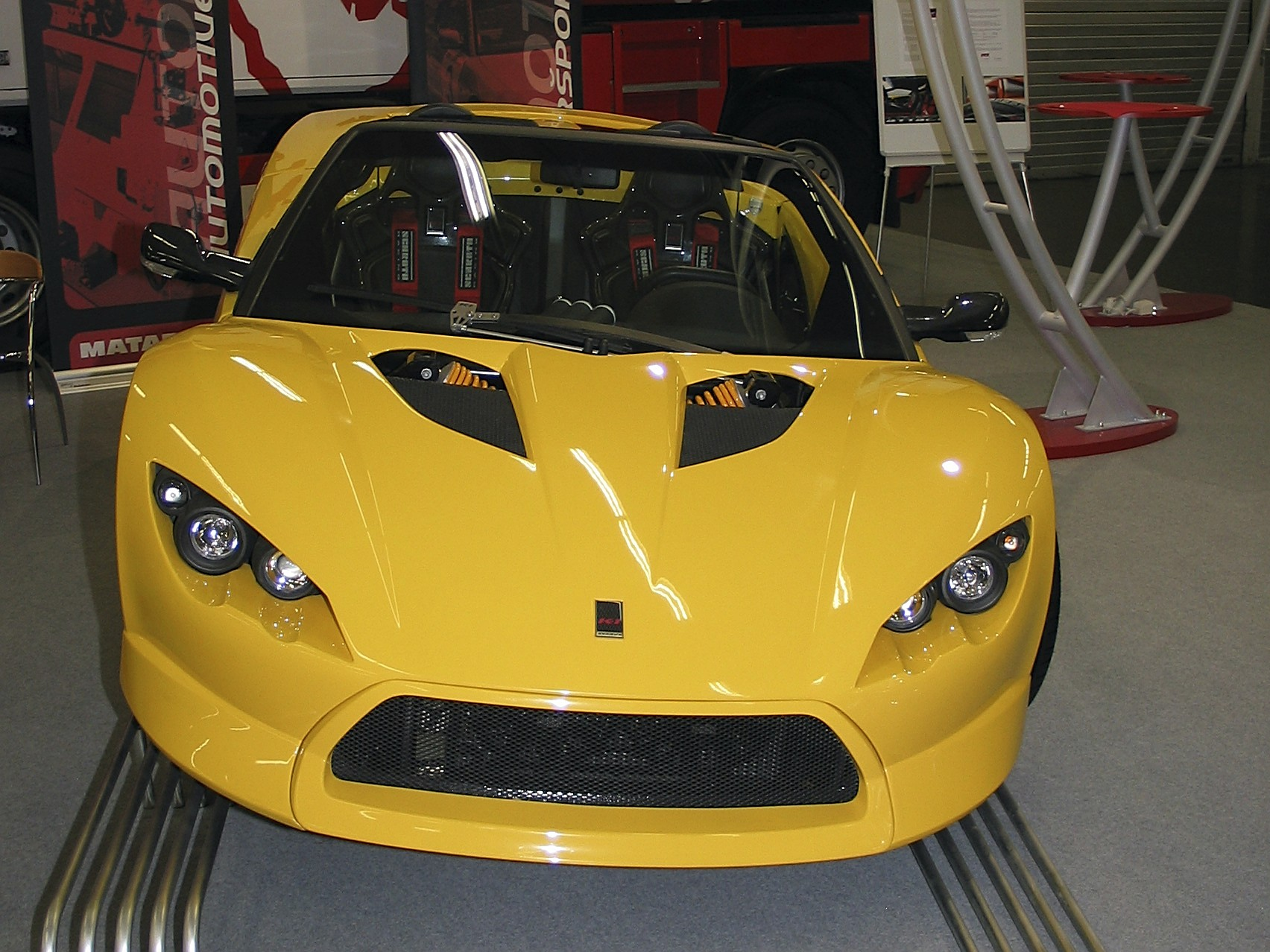
K1 Attack

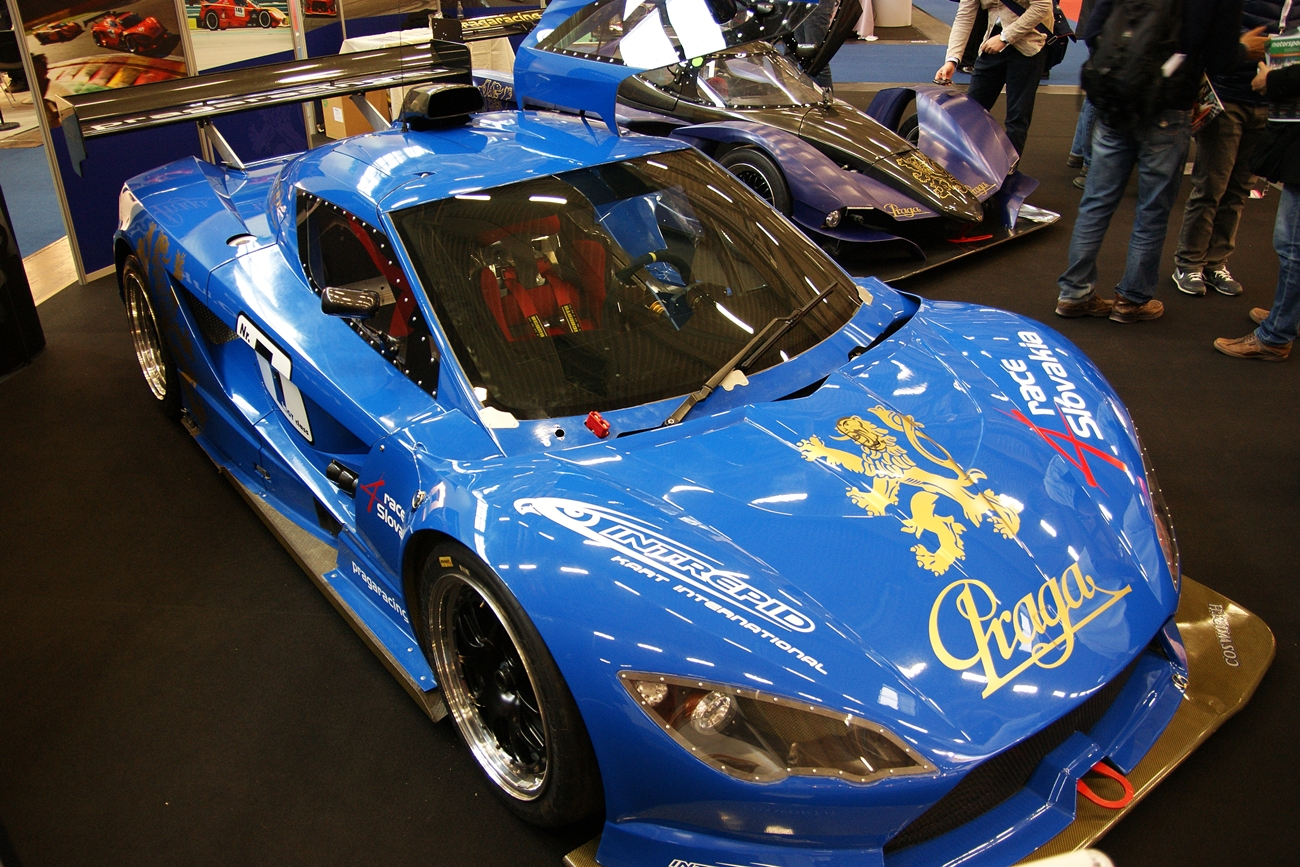
K1 Attack race car
