= Trnavské automobilové závody =

Defunct Slovakian automobile manufacturer

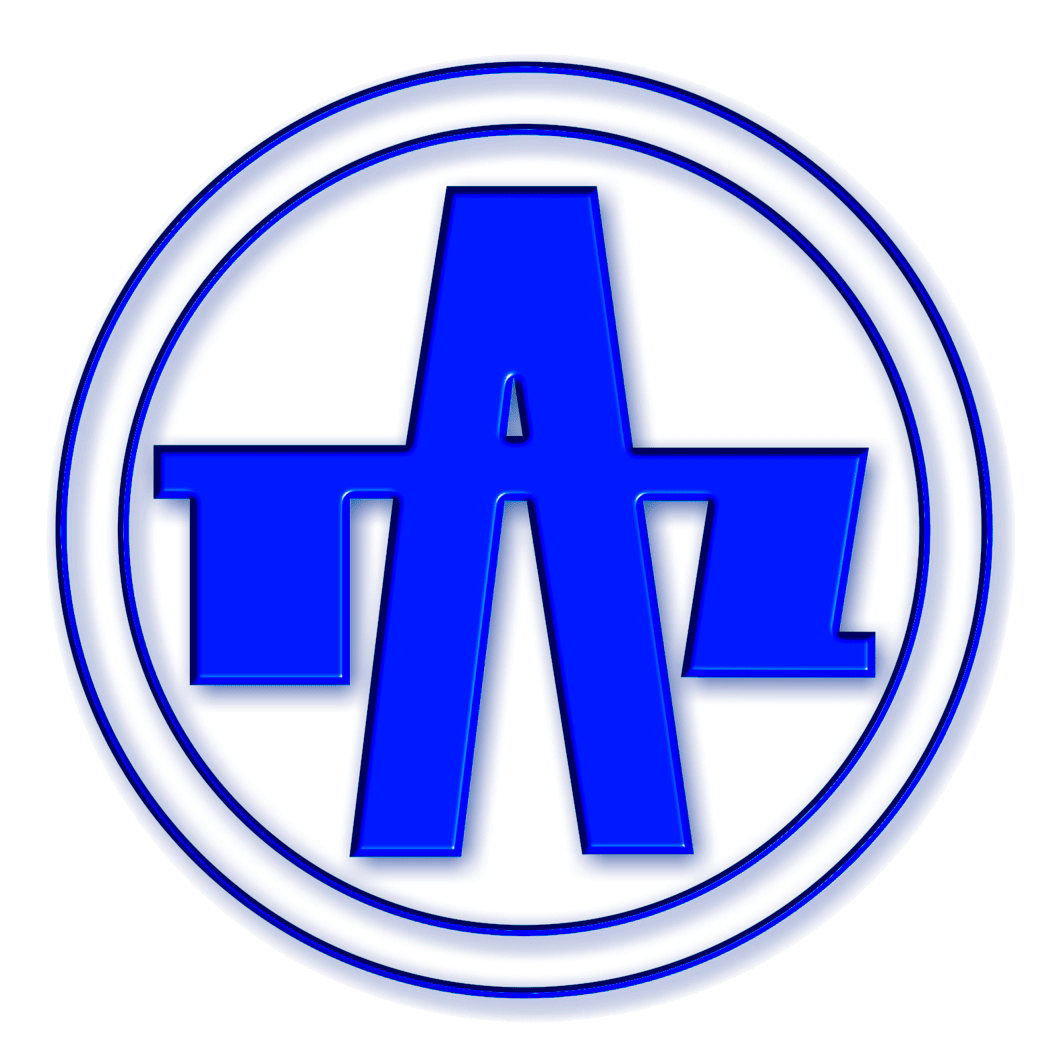

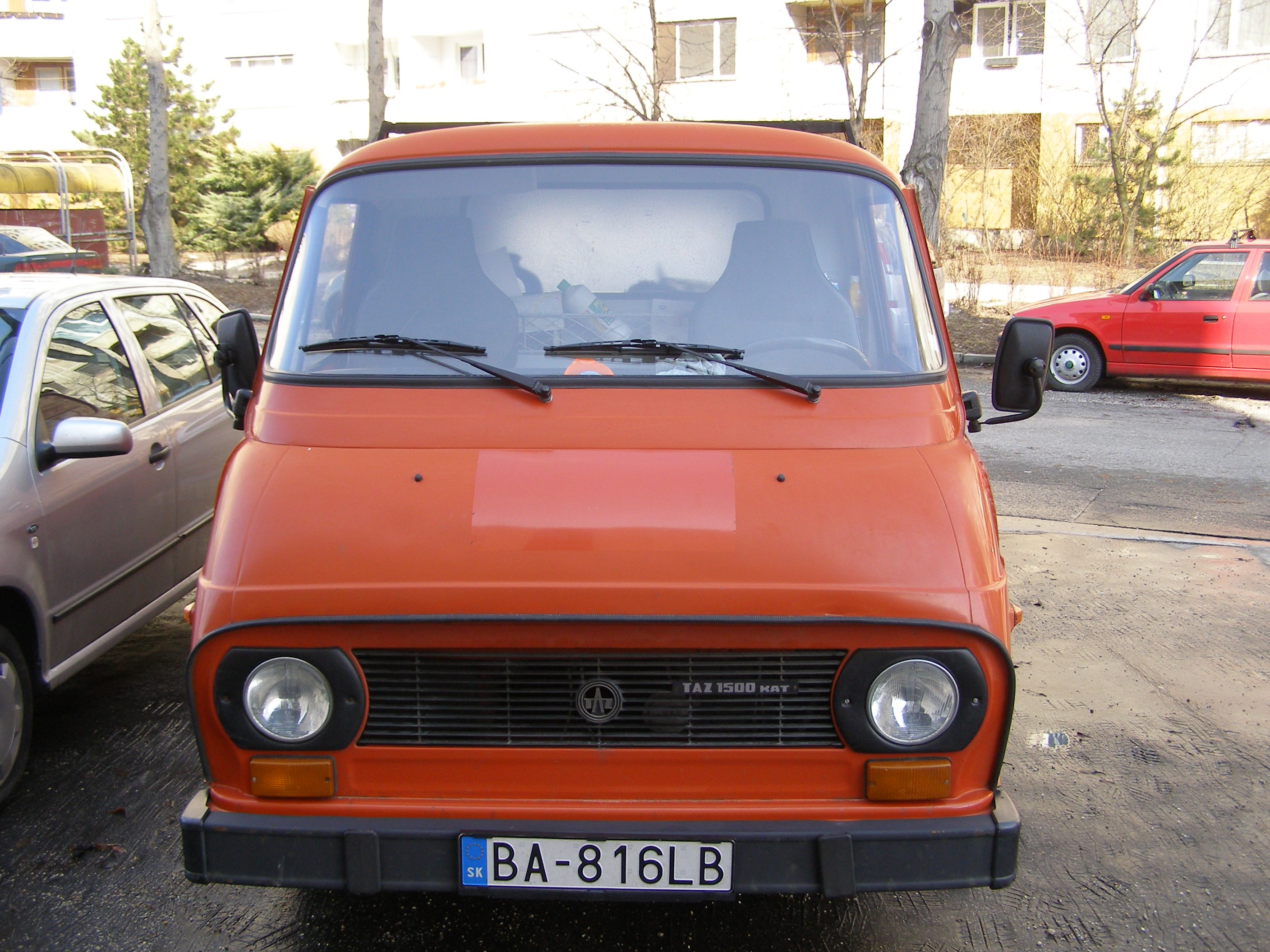
- TAZ 1500
- Industry: Automotive
- Founded: 1973; 53 years ago
- Defunct: 1999
- Headquarters: Trnava, Slovakia

Trnavské automobilové závody (TAZ) was an automobile manufacturer in Trnava, Slovakia, that produced cars between 1973 and 1999. When the company folded the manufacturing rights to the van TAZ 1500 (earlier Škoda 1203) was bought by Ocelot Auto. TAZ was one part of the Škoda-Factories. Before the production of the 1203/1500, TAZ was a producer of automobile-parts and home appliances manufacturer.
