= 81st =

81st is the ordinal form of the number 81. 81st or Eighty-first may also refer to:

- A fraction, 1/81, equal to one of 81 equal parts

== Geography ==
- 81st meridian east, a line of longitude
- 81st meridian west, a line of longitude
- 81st parallel north, a circle of latitude
- 81st parallel south, a circle of latitude
- 81st Street (disambiguation)

== Military ==
- 81st Group Army, People's Republic of China
- 81st Brigade (disambiguation)
- 81st Division (disambiguation)
- 81st Regiment (disambiguation)
- 81st Squadron (disambiguation)

== Other ==
- 81st century
- 81st century BC

== See also ==
- 81 (disambiguation)
- The 81st Blow , 1974 Israeli documentary film
