= Tatra 163 =

Czech truck family

Tatra T 163 Jamal
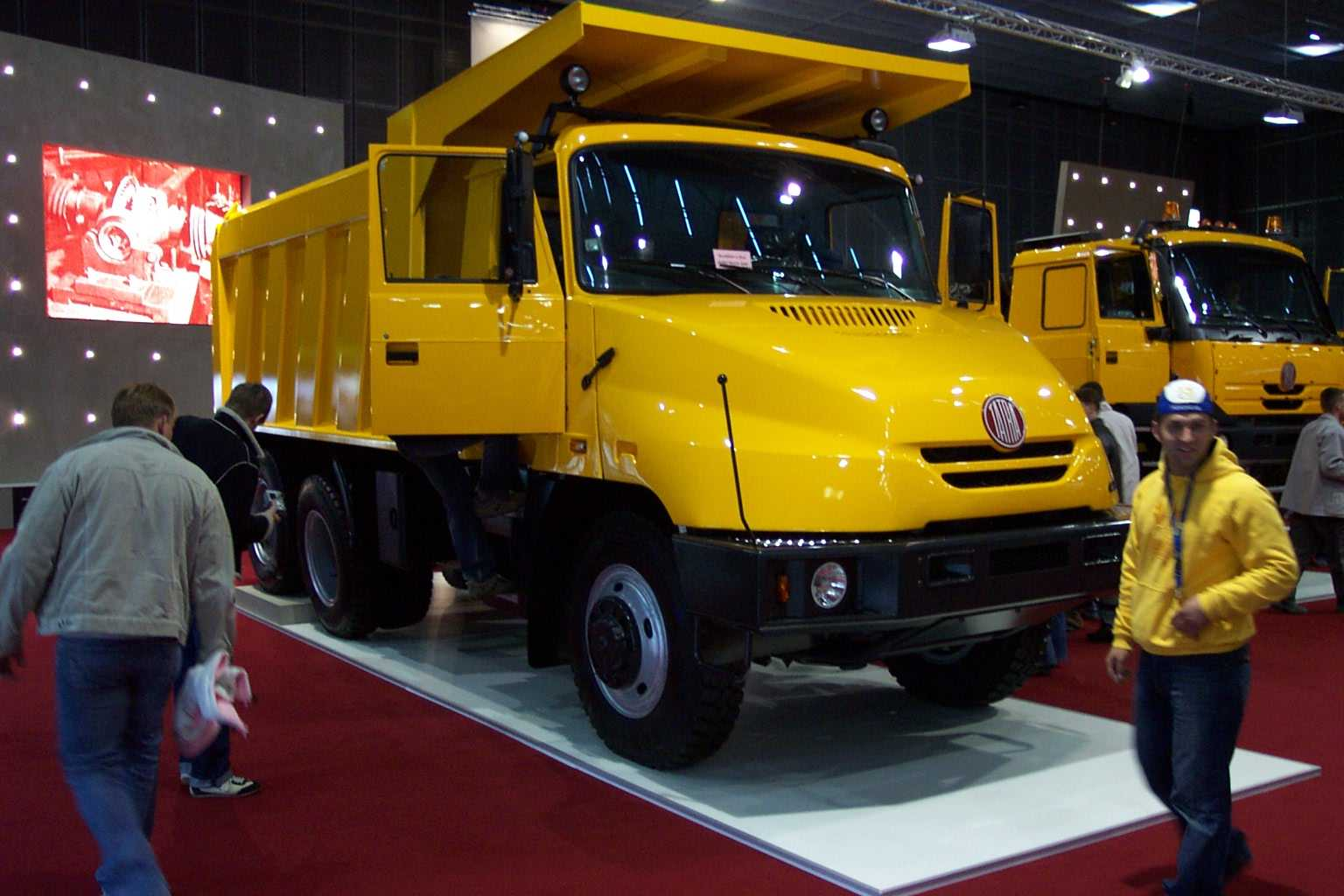

Overview
- Manufacturer: Tatra
- Production: 1999 – 2014
- Assembly: Kopřivnice, Moravia, Czech Republic

Body and chassis
- Class: Heavy truck
- Body style: conventional

Powertrain
- Engine: Tatra diesel air-cooled V8; 270kW-325kW
- Transmission: Tatra: 10 speed manual; 14 speed manual; Auxiliary Tatra two-speed

Dimensions
- Wheelbase: 3,700 mm (145.7 in) + 1,450 mm (57.1 in); 4,090 mm (161.0 in) + 1,450 mm (57.1 in)
- Length: 7,990 mm (314.6 in); 8,480 mm (333.9 in)
- Width: 2,550 mm (100.4 in)
- Height: 3,400 mm (133.9 in)
- Curb weight: 10,420 kg (22,970 lb) empty 38,000 kg (84,000 lb) loaded

Chronology
- Predecessor: Tatra T148

Tatra Jamal Evo IV

Overview
- Manufacturer: Tatra
- Production: 2003
- Assembly: Kopřivnice, Moravia, Czech Republic

Body and chassis
- Class: Race truck
- Body style: conventional

Powertrain
- Engine: SMR 126 R straight 6; 932kW (1250HP)
- Transmission: ZF HP 600 five-speed automatic

Dimensions
- Wheelbase: 3,800 mm (149.6 in)
- Length: 5,050 mm (198.8 in)
- Width: 2,550 mm (100.4 in)
- Height: 2,550 mm (100.4 in)
- Curb weight: 4,800 kg (10,600 lb)

The Tatra T 163 Jamal (named after the Yamal Peninsula in Siberia, Russia) is a heavy truck made by the Czech company Tatra. It uses the traditional Tatra concept of a rigid backbone tube and swinging half-axles giving independent suspension. The vehicles are available primarily in 6x6 and alternatively also 4x4 variants. It is marketed either as a road-legal heavy truck (tipper or semi-trailer truck) or as a working machine (e.g. for use in mines). The T163 is a continuation of the tradition started with the Tatra T 111, which played a crucial role in the effort to rebuild Central and Eastern Europe after the Second World War as well as in conquering the Russian Far East.

== History ==
At the beginning of the 1980s both the conventional Tatra T 148 and COE Tatra T 813s were succeeded by the single line of COE Tatra T 815s. However, Tatra aimed to develop a conventional heavy dump truck for use in the hardest of conditions (i.e. mines). This led to the Tatra T 162 prototype, which wasn't introduced into serial production. Later in 1995 the first prototype of the upcoming T 163 line was constructed, though it was designated as T-815-24BSK8. The traditional design offers higher safety for the driver and easier access to the engine. The bonnet is made from a light laminate and it folds forward.

A truck with conventional setting of cabin was demanded especially by Tatra's customers from Russian Siberia, where Tatra's air-cooled engines require less maintenance compared to water-cooled ones. The main reason why the conventional cab is preferred is that the driver may warm up in the cabin even during a potential on-road engine repair, as the cabin has independent heating.

During 1995-1998 a number of prototypes were manufactured. In 1997 a prototype was tested in Arctic Siberia, later to be handed over to a gas drilling company. In 1998 the bonnet was shortened by 295 mm to comply with directives concerning the maximum length of truck and trailer. In 1999 the truck was certified for use on the roads of the Czech Republic, Slovakia and Russia and later the same year full production began.
