= T81 =

T81 may refer to:

- T.81 (ITU-T recommendation), a JPEG image standard
- Cooper T81, a racing car
- Hawker Hunter T.81, a British-built trainer aircraft
- T81 Chemical Mortar Motor Carriage, an American chemical weapons delivery system
- Tatra 81, a Czechoslovak heavy truck
- Type 81 assault rifle
