= J81 =

J81 may refer to:

== Vehicular ==
- Westinghouse J81, an axial-flow turbojet engine
- Renault Espace (J81), an MPV
- LNER Class J81, a British locomotive class designed by Thomas Wheatley
- J81, a VIN prefix used in Asia; see vehicle identification number

== Other uses ==
- Metabidiminished rhombicosidodecahedron (Johnson solid J_{81})
- Guirguillano Observatory (obsevatory code J81), Guirguillano, Spain; see List of observatory codes

== See also ==
- Shenyang J-8 I "Finback", a Chinese jet fighter plane, a variant of the MiG-21
- 81 (disambiguation)
- J (disambiguation)
