= 811 (disambiguation) =

811 may refer to:

- 811 (number), a number in the 800s range
- 811 AD, a year in the Common Era
- 811 BC, a year Before the Common Era

== Places ==
- Route 811, see List of highways numbered 811
- 811 Nauheima, an asteroid in the Solar System, the 811th asteroid registered

== Transportation ==
- Flight 811 (disambiguation)
- 811 series, a Japanese electric multiple unit train class
- IAR 811, a Romanian training airplane

== Other uses ==
- 8-1-1, an N-1-1 telephone number in North America for non-urgent services
- March 811, a Formula One racing car

== See also ==
- 81 (disambiguation)
