= Flight 811 =

Flight 811 may refer to:

Listed chronologically

- China Airlines Flight 811, crash-landed in Manila on 27 February 1980
- Aeroflot Flight 811, collided mid-air on 24 August 1981
- China Airlines Flight 811, the flight of Ninoy Aquino, who was assassinated while deplaning on 21 August 1983; see Assassination of Ninoy Aquino
- United Airlines Flight 811, suffered explosive decompression over the Pacific Ocean on 24 February 1989

== See also ==
- 811 (disambiguation)
