= Tatra 138 =

Czech truck family

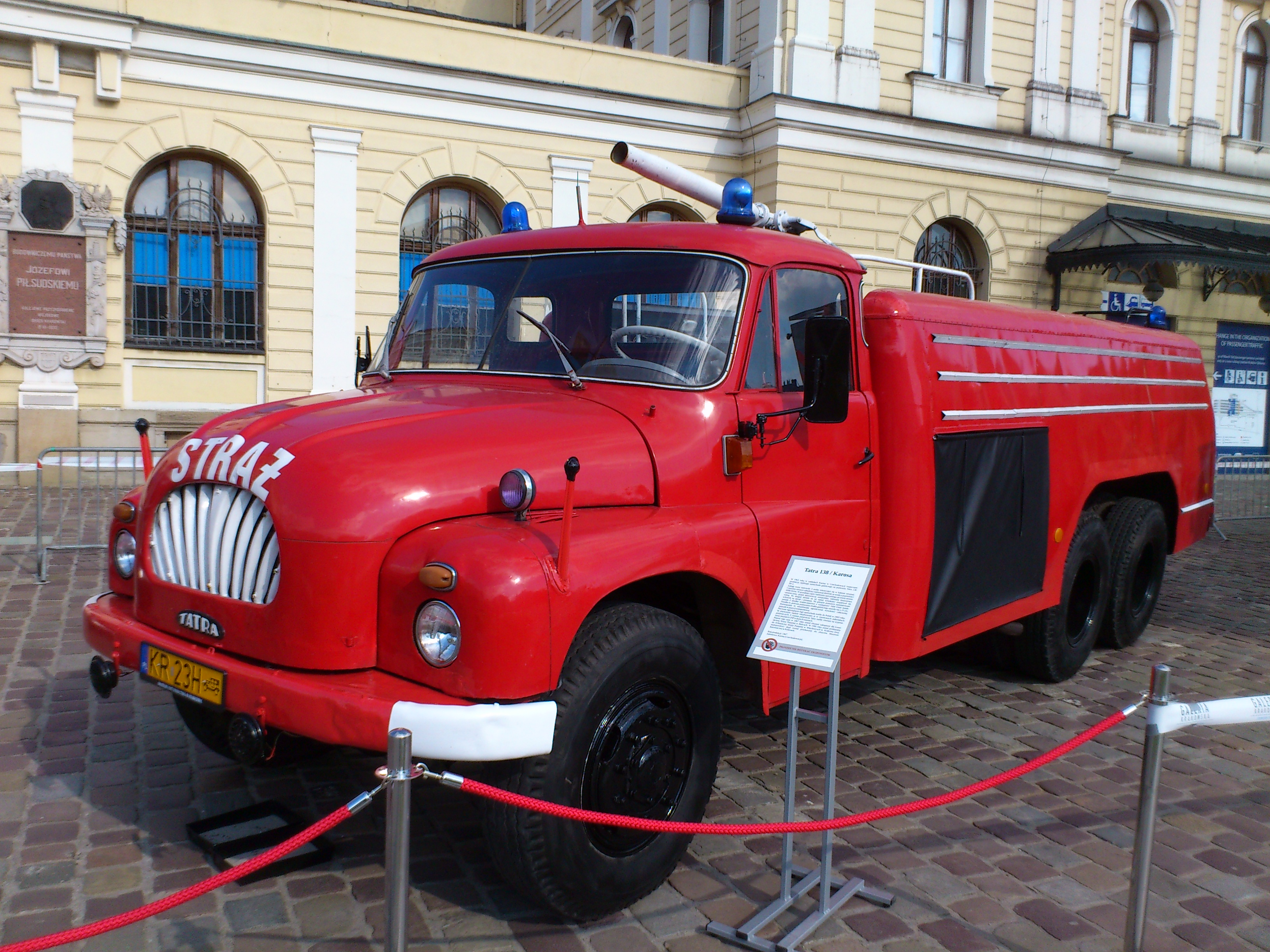
- Tatra 138 firetruck

Overview
- Manufacturer: Tatra
- Production: 1959–1971

Body and chassis
- Class: Heavy truck
- Body style: Conventional

Powertrain
- Engine: V8 T 928
- Transmission: 5-speed manual + 2-speed auxiliary gearbox

Chronology
- Predecessor: Tatra 111
- Successor: Tatra 148

The Tatra 138 is a truck produced in Czechoslovakia by the Tatra company. Known as the immediate successor to the Tatra 111, the model introduced a number of new features while continuing the evolution of Tatra concept. The truck was produced from 1959 to 1971.

== History ==
The decision to replace the Tatra 111 was made in 1952 as part of a central state planning economy, where Tatra Kopřivnice was to produce 7 to 10 ton utility trucks. In 1956 at II. At the Czechoslovak Machinery Expo in Brno, Tatra exhibited 2 new models, the T137 and T138. Both vehicles had up to 70% of parts in common across the range. New design features were introduced, such as improvement in driver environment and usability e.g. hydraulic power steering, a compressed air assisted clutch and electro-pneumatic auxiliary gearbox gear selection.

== Design and technology ==
The design was of central backbone tube construction with modular power train concept in 4×4, 4×2, 6×6, 6×4 and 6×2 configuration. Version 4×2, 6×4, and 6×2 were produced in very low quantity. The main advantages of central load carrying backbone tube are in its high torsion and bend strength protecting truck body against load stresses. The secondary advantage is that it houses all important parts of the drive train. In addition, it enables a concept of modular construction where designers and customers can specify 4- or 6-wheel drive and various length and wheelbase combinations.

=== Engine ===
T 928

Overview
- Manufacturer: Tatra

Layout
- Configuration: 75° V8
- Displacement: 11.8 L; 717.8 cu in (11,762 cc)
- Cylinder bore: 120 mm (4.7 in)
- Piston stroke: 130 mm (5.1 in)
- Cylinder block material: Cast iron
- Cylinder head material: Aluminium alloy
- Valvetrain: OHV
- Compression ratio: 16.5:1

Combustion
- Fuel system: Direct injection
- Fuel type: Diesel
- Cooling system: Air-cooled

Output
- Power output: 132.5 kW (178 hp) @ 2000 rpm
- Torque output: 720 N⋅m (531 ft⋅lbf) @ 1200 rpm

Dimensions
- Dry weight: 595 kg (1,312 lb)

The engine was located ahead of the front axle. It featured an air-cooled V8 75° with dry sump design and a new featured thermostat controlled cooling fan by engine oil temperature via hydraulic clutch drive to reduce noise and fuel consumption. The engine was also used in the OT-64 APC.

=== Chassis ===
Central backbone tube, front and rear axles with independent swing half axles. The front suspension by torque arms (torsion bars) and hydraulic shock absorbers. The rear suspension by longitudinal half elliptic leaf springs. Front axle drive selectable on demand, differential locks electro-pneumatically controlled via dash switches.

- Front track - 1,930 mm (76.0 in)
- Rear track - 1,752 mm (69.0 in)
- Wheelbase - model specific
- Tatra T138 6×6 PP2, P3, PP6 - 4,260 mm (167.7 in)+1,320 mm (52.0 in)
  - Tatra T138 6×6 PR14, PPR S3, PR S1, P19 - 3,690 mm (145.3 in)+1,320 mm (52.0 in)
    - Tatra T138 4×4 - 4,550 mm (179.1 in)
- Ground clearance - 290 mm (11.4 in)

=== Transmission ===
- Main gearbox - 5+1 (2-5 gear synchronized)
  - Auxiliary gearbox - 2-speed (half split electro-pneumatic control)
    - Step down transfer case
- Clutch - 2x plate dry

=== Brakes ===
- Main wheel brakes - dual circuit full air drum brakes
  - Park brake - mechanical via output shaft at the back of the gearbox
    - Supplementary brake - exhaust brake electro-pneumatically controlled

=== Bodywork ===
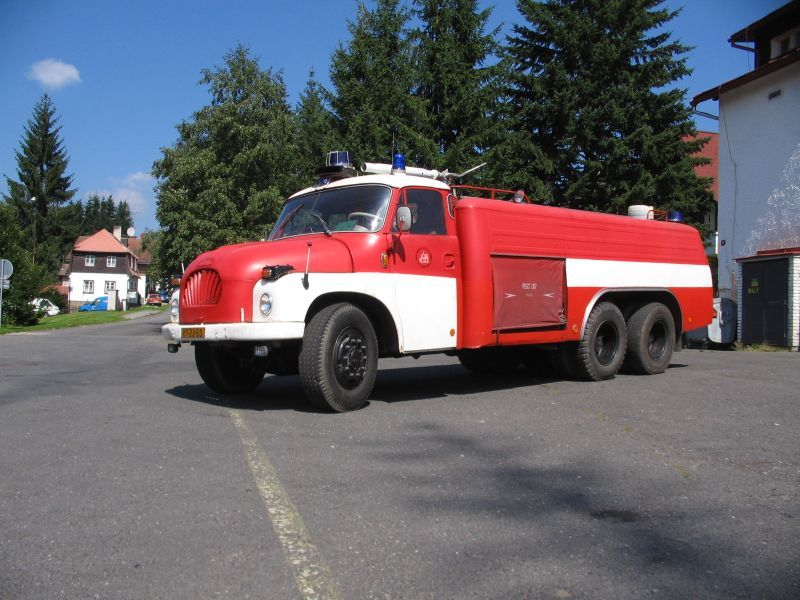
T138 CAS firefighting vehicle

All steel cab construction with various body builder equipment such as tippers, flatbeds, concrete mixers, tankers, cranes, excavators and firefighting. The vehicle had a top speed of 72 km/h (45 mph), capable of water crossing depth 800 mm (31 in), with maximum payload of 12,000 kg (26,500 lb) and could tow trailers up to 15,000 kg (33,100 lb) GCM.

== Production ==
Total production exceeded 45,900 units. The Tatra T138 was exported to the USSR, Bulgaria, Romania, Poland, France, Austria, Yugoslavia and the Netherlands.

=== Primary variants ===
- T138 S1 - one-way tipper
- T138 S3 - three-way tipper
- T138 V, VN - civilian and military flatbed
- T138 P1V - military special
- T138 CAS - firefighting unit
- T138 PP6V - excavator
- T138 PP5, PP4V, PP7 - tanker
- T138 P3, P11, P18, PP2, PP5, PP6, PP7, PP8V - crane
- T138 PP7 - concrete mixer
