= 81st Division =

81st Division or 81st Infantry Division may refer to:

== Infantry divisions ==
- 81st Podrinje Independent Division, Republic of Bosnia and Herzegovina
- 81st Division (People's Republic of China)
- 81st Infantry Division (Wehrmacht), Germany
- 81st Reserve Division, German Empire
- 81st Division (Imperial Japanese Army)
- 81st Division (Nigeria)
- 81st Division (Philippines)
- 81st Infantry Division (Russian Empire)
- 81st Guards Rifle Division, Soviet Union, later the 81st Guards Motor Rifle Division
- 81st Rifle Division, Soviet Union
- 81st (West Africa) Division, United Kingdom
- 81st Infantry Division (United States)

== Cavalry divisions ==
- 81st Cavalry Division, Soviet Union

== See also ==
- List of military divisions by number
- 81st Brigade (disambiguation)
- 81st Regiment (disambiguation)
- 81st Squadron (disambiguation)
