= 81 Squadron =

81 Squadron or 81st Squadron may refer to:

- No. 81 Squadron IAF, India
- No. 81 Squadron PAF, Pakistan
- No. 81 Squadron RAF, United Kingdom
- 81st Aero Squadron, Air Service, United States Army
- 81st Fighter Squadron, United States Air Force
- VFA-81 (Fighter Attack Squadron 81), United States Navy

== See also ==
- 81st Division (disambiguation)
- 81st Brigade (disambiguation)
- 81st Regiment (disambiguation)
