= 81st Regiment =

81st Regiment may refer to:

- 81st Regiment of Foot (Aberdeenshire Highland Regiment), a unit of the British Army, 1777–1783
- 81st Regiment of Foot (Loyal Lincoln Volunteers), a unit of the British Army
- 81st Infantry Regiment (PA), a unit of the Philippine Commonwealth Army during the Second World War
- 81st Infantry Regiment (Imperial Japanese Army), a unit of the Japanese Army
- 81st Assault Aviation Regiment, later Fighter-Bomber regiment, an aviation unit of the Yugoslav Air Force

American Civil War

- 81st Illinois Volunteer Infantry Regiment, a unit of the Union (Northern) Army
- 81st Indiana Infantry Regiment, a unit of the Union (Northern) Army
- 81st New York Volunteer Infantry, a unit of the Union (Northern) Army
- 81st Ohio Infantry, a unit of the Union (Northern) Army
- 81st Pennsylvania Infantry, a unit of the Union (Northern) Army

== See also ==
- 81st Division (disambiguation)
- 81st Brigade (disambiguation)
- 81st Squadron (disambiguation)
