= 81st Street =

81st Street may refer to:

- 81st Street (Manhattan), New York City
- 81st Street (IRT Ninth Avenue Line), New York City

== See also ==
- 81st Street – Museum of Natural History (IND Eighth Avenue Line)
