= 81st Brigade =

81st Brigade may refer to:

== Romania ==
- 81st Mechanized Brigade (Romania), a unit of the Romanian Army

== Russia ==
- 81st Special Forces Brigade

== Spain ==
- 81st Mixed Brigade, a unit of the Spanish Republican Army

== Ukraine ==
- 81st Airmobile Brigade (Ukraine), a unit of the Ukrainian Air Assault Forces

== United Kingdom ==
- 81st Brigade (United Kingdom), a formation of the British Army in the First World War
- 81st (Howitzer) Brigade, Royal Field Artillery, a unit of the British Army in the First World War
- 81st (Welsh) Brigade, Royal Field Artillery, a unit of the British Army after the First World War

== United States ==
- 81st Stryker Brigade Combat Team

== See also ==
- 81st Division (disambiguation)
- 81st Regiment (disambiguation)
- 81st Squadron (disambiguation)
