= 81 =

81 may refer to:

- 81 (number), the natural number following 80 and preceding 82
- one of the years 81 BC, AD 81, 1981, 2081
- The international calling code for Japan
- Nickname for the Hells Angels Motorcycle Club. "H" is the eighth letter of the alphabet, and "A" is the first.
- 81 Terpsichore, a main-belt asteroid
- 81 mm mortar, a military indirect fire weapon

== See also ==
- 81st (disambiguation)
- List of highways numbered 81
- Tatra 81, a heavy-duty truck
