= Tatra 111 =

Czech truck family

Overview
- Manufacturer: Tatra
- Production: 1942-1962; 33690 produced

Body and chassis
- Class: Truck
- Body style: Conventional

Powertrain
- Engine: 14.8L Tatra V910 V12 diesel
- Transmission: 4-speed manual + 1-speed gearbox

Dimensions
- Wheelbase: 4,175 mm (164 in) + 1,220 mm (48 in)
- Length: 8,550 mm (337 in)
- Width: 2,500 mm (98 in)
- Height: 2,570 kg (5,666 lb)
- Curb weight: 8,500 kg (18,739 lb)

Chronology
- Predecessor: Tatra 81
- Successor: Tatra 138

The Tatra 111 was a heavy-duty truck produced by the Tatra company in Czechoslovakia.

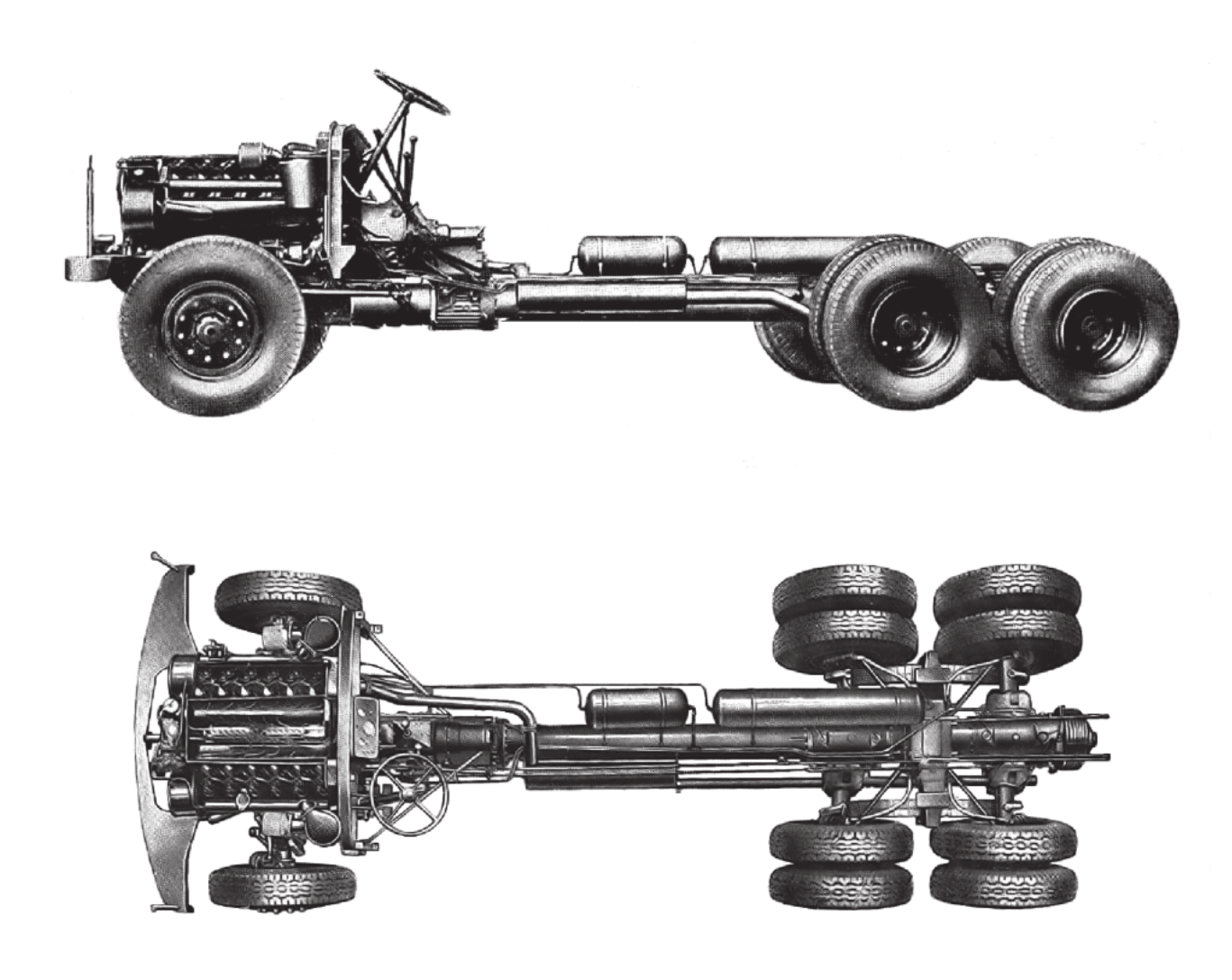
Drawing of the Tatra 111 chassis

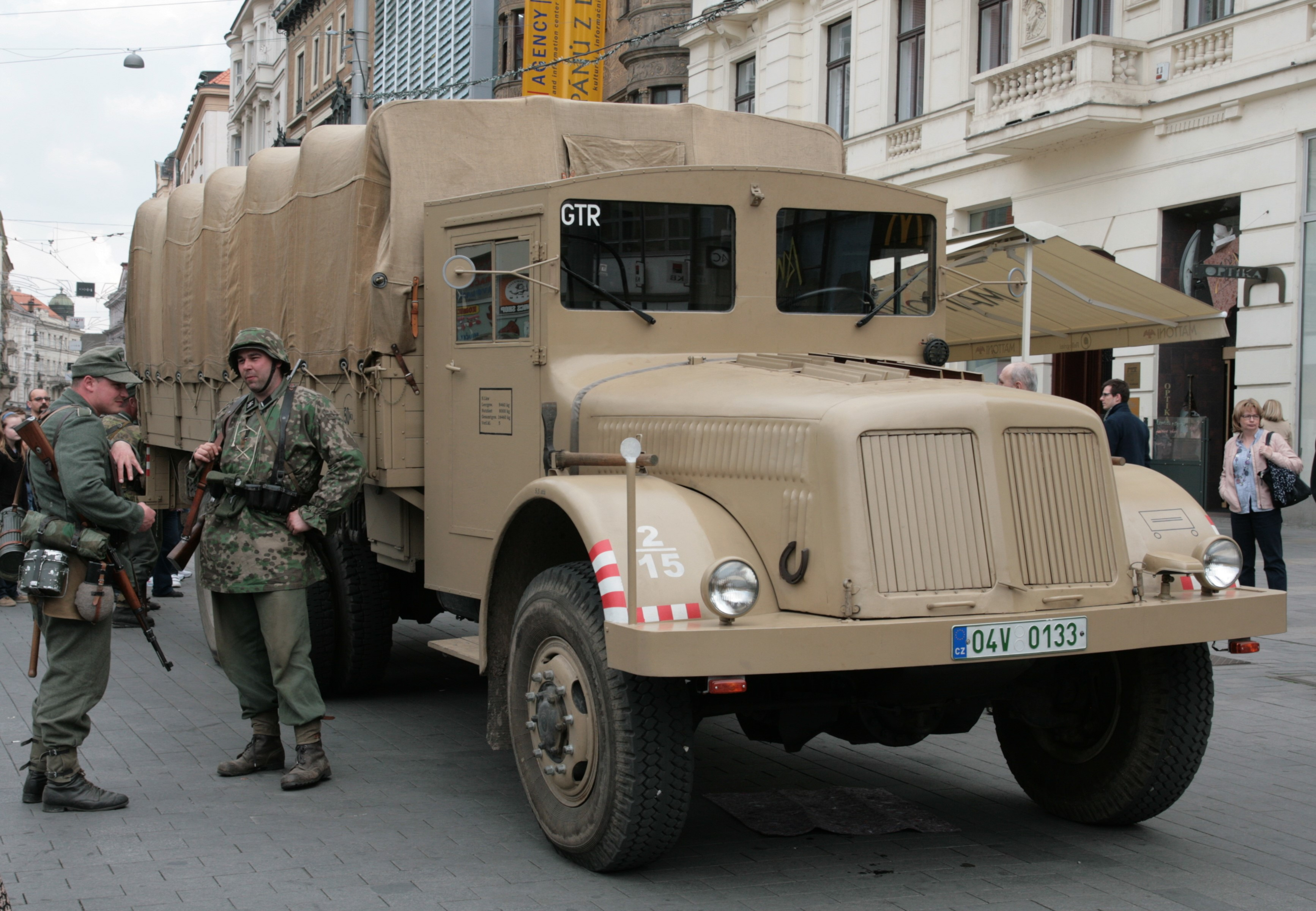
The 70th anniversary of Brno's Liberation by the Soviet Red Army

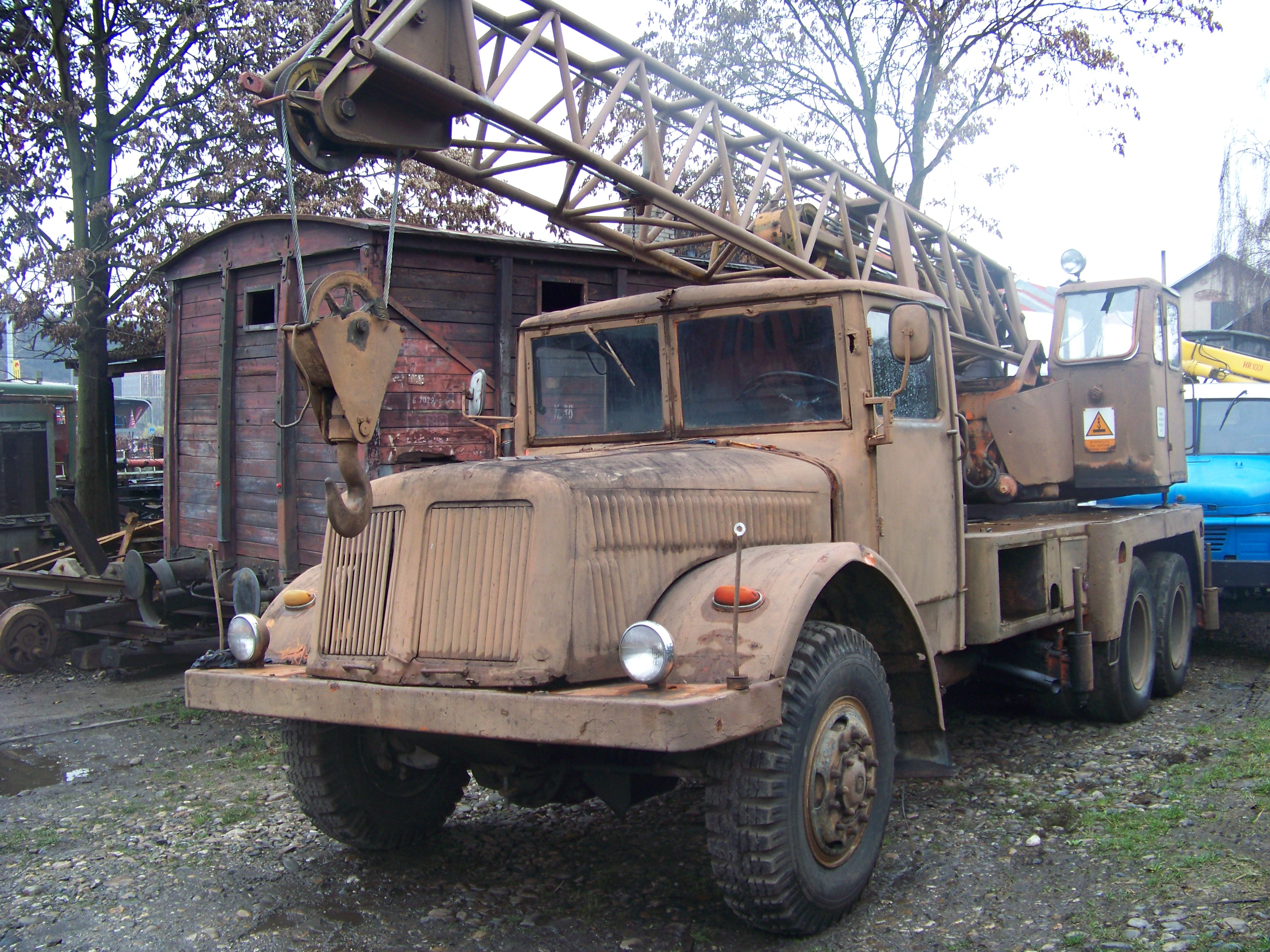
Tatra 111 crane truck

== History ==
The T111 was developed and manufactured during World War II as a heavy-duty truck for use by the Wehrmacht. The production started in 1942 and continued for twenty years, ending in 1962 when it was replaced by the Tatra 138. Despite being built for the Nazi war machine, the vehicle ultimately played an important role after the war ended. The Tatra 111 made a significant contribution to the rebuilding effort during the postwar era, primarily in Eastern Europe and the USSR. To its chief designer, however, it brought charges of treason and collaboration with the Nazi regime. After the communist coup d'état in Czechoslovakia, Tatra's design guru, Hans Ledwinka, was sentenced and imprisoned.

== Design and technology ==
The design was based on the proven Tatra concept; a backbone tube chassis construction with swing half axles, a modular gearbox, and differential assemblies. The main advantages of the central load-carrying backbone tube are its high torsion and bend strength, which protect the truck body against load stresses. The secondary advantage is that it houses all the essential parts of the drivetrain. Due to its torsional stiffness and use of differential locks, the vehicle had exceptional off-road capabilities. The ability to use a cranking handle to start the engine was a notable feature.

=== Engine ===
The powerplant, Tatra 103, Model V910, was derived from the Tatra V850 engine, which was intended for use in the Sd.Kfz. 234. It was Tatra's first air-cooled 75-degree V12 powerplant. The engine had a power output of 210 horsepower at 2,250 rpm. While adequate for wartime use, the engine's power was later reduced to 180 hp at 1,800 rpm to improve reliability. (The average life expectancy during combat for the Wehrmacht was 6 hours.) The engine has three camshafts and was initially cooled by two covered chain-driven cooling fans. A belt drive later replaced the fan chains. This engine variant had the designation T111A.

=== Chassis ===
The chassis consisted of a central backbone tube and front and rear axles with independent swing half axles. The front axle was suspended on quarter elliptic leaf springs. The rear axles were suspended on half elliptic longitudinal leaf springs. The service brakes were air-actuated drums, and the parking brake had mechanical actuation on the rear end of the backbone tube output shaft via a rotating drum.

- Front track = 2,080 mm (81.9 in)
- Rear track = 1,800 mm (70.9 in)
- Wheelbase = 4,175 mm (164.4 in)+1,200 mm (47.2 in)
- Road clearance = 300 mm (11.8 in)

=== Transmission ===
- Drive - 6x6 selectable front wheel drive
- Main gearbox - 4+1 (1st and 2nd gears synchronized)
  - gear ratios - 5.29, 2.78, 1.62, 1.00, R 5.91
    - Auxiliary gearbox - 2-speed
      - gear ratios - offroad - 4.52, highway - 1.82
- Differentials - ratio 3.19
- Clutch - 2x plate, dry

=== Bodywork ===
The cab was originally constructed from wood due to the strategic unavailability of steel during the war. In later years, the wooden frame was replaced with a steel one, and the last models featured an all-steel cabin. The vehicle was capable of a top speed of approximately 40 mph (65 km/h). The maximum cargo capacity was 10.3 tonnes with a 22-tonne towing capacity.

== Production ==
The Tatra 111 was in production for 20 years, with a total production volume of about 34,000 units. The T111 engine was extensively used in a variety of other vehicles, including a heavy-duty tractor (T141), a railway car (M131), airport tugs, and military pontoon bridges. The engine was also "halved" to create an inline 6-cylinder version for the Praga V3S 6x6 light utility military truck and the civilian Praga S5T light truck. Based on the T111 V12 engine, a V8 version was developed for the T128 4x4 truck, which was primarily designed from T111 parts for the Czechoslovak military. T111's most popular variants were flatbed, tipper, tanker, and crane configurations.

Models
Model	Type
T111 R	Flatbed
T111 NR	Flatbed with an auxiliary gearbox-powered winch
T111 N Special	Flatbed with foldable sides and a winch (military spec)
T111 S	Three-way tipper with wooden sides
T111 S2	All-steel three-way heavy-duty tipper
T111 C	Tanker
T111 D	Bodybuilders chassis

== Legacy ==
Tatra's exploits in Siberia earned the vehicle a reputation for durability under extreme Arctic conditions, largely due to its air-cooled engine eliminating the risk of frozen or cracked coolant blocks. This mechanical reliability contributed to its legendary status among regional drivers, culminating in the preservation of a 1947 model as a public monument in Susuman, Magadan Oblast in 1973. The T111 concept and technology continued its evolution in the following years with subsequent Tatra truck models.
