= Tatra 148 =

Czech truck family

Tatra 148 S1
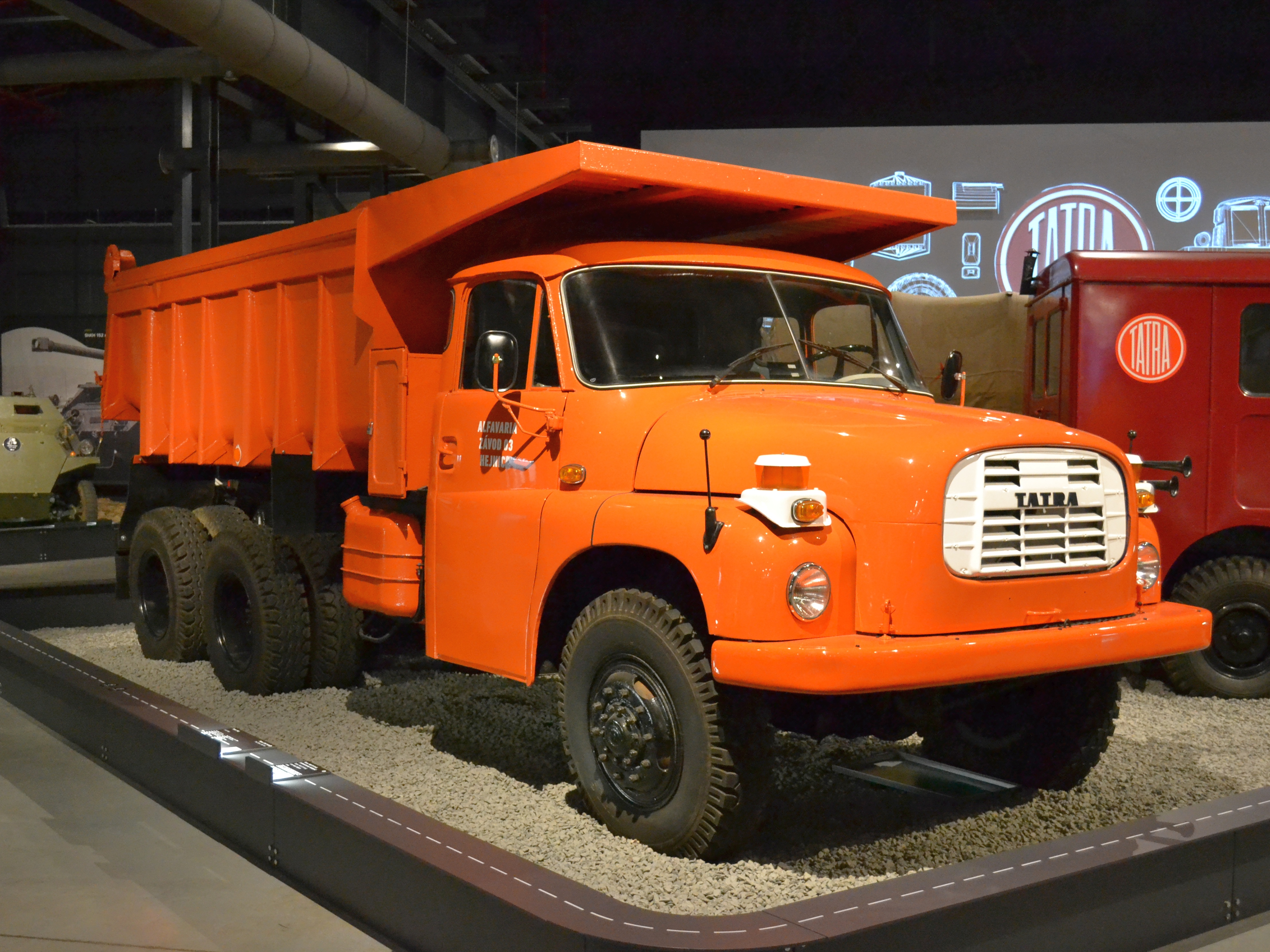

Overview
- Manufacturer: Tatra
- Production: 1972–1982

Body and chassis
- Class: Heavy truck
- Body style: Conventional

Powertrain
- Engine: V8 T2 928 E
- Transmission: 5-speed manual + 2-speed auxiliary gearbox

Dimensions
- Length: 7,295 mm (287.2 in) (T148 S3)
- Width: 2,500 mm (98.4 in)
- Height: 2,610 mm (102.8 in) (T148 S3)
- Curb weight: 10,800 kg (23,810 lb) (T148 S3)

Chronology
- Predecessor: Tatra 138
- Successor: Tatra 815

T2 928 E

Overview
- Manufacturer: Tatra

Layout
- Configuration: V8
- Displacement: 12.7 L; 773.0 cu in (12,667 cc)
- Cylinder bore: 120 mm (4.7 in)
- Piston stroke: 140 mm (5.5 in)
- Cylinder block material: Cast iron
- Cylinder head material: Aluminium alloy
- Valvetrain: OHV
- Compression ratio: 16.5:1

Combustion
- Fuel system: Direct injection
- Fuel type: Diesel
- Cooling system: Air-cooled

Output
- Power output: 148.6 kW (199 hp) @ 2000 rpm
- Torque output: 800 N⋅m (590 ft⋅lbf) @ 1200 rpm

Dimensions
- Dry weight: 845 kg (1,863 lb)

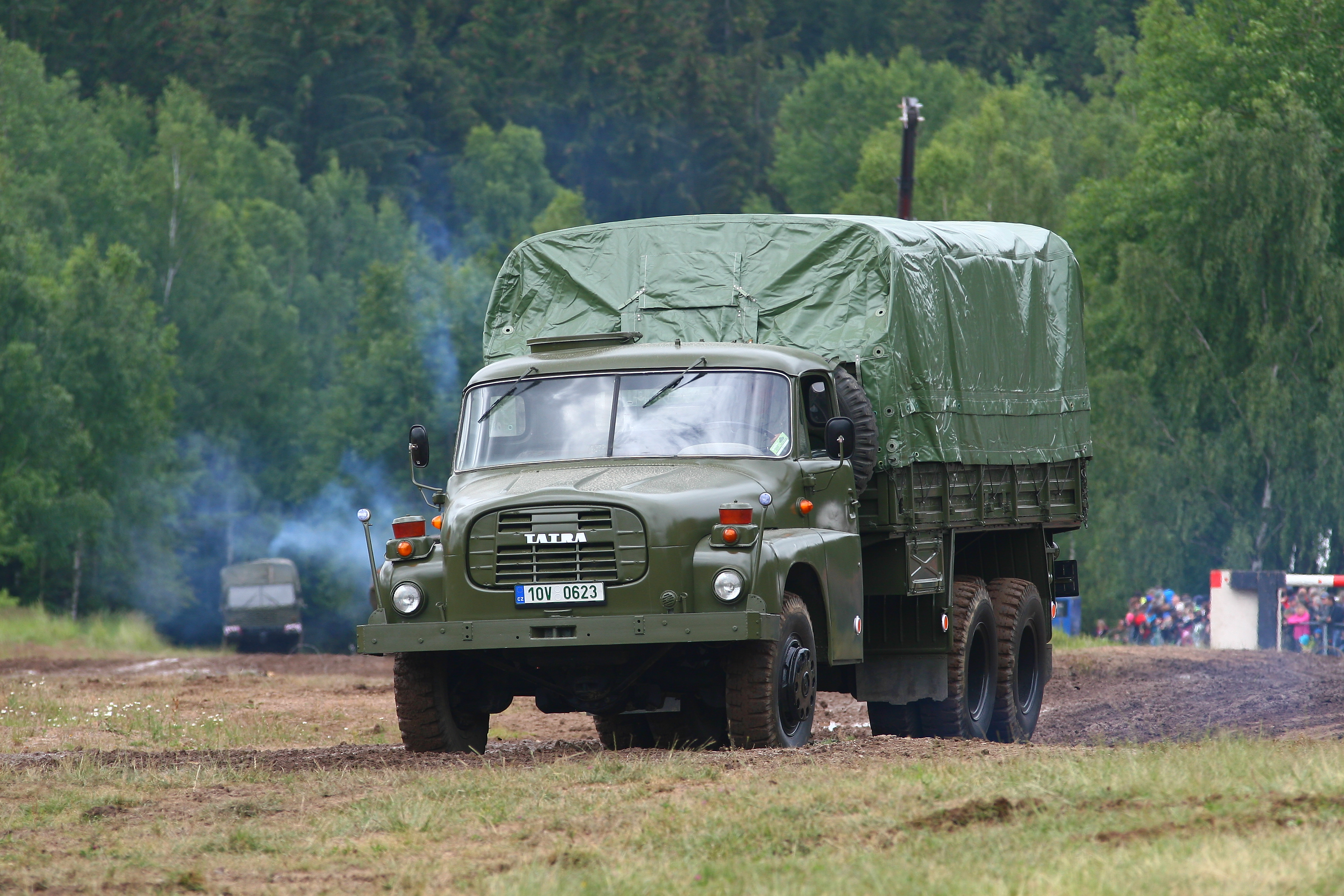
Tatra 148 VNM Military

The Tatra 148 was a truck produced in Czechoslovakia by the Tatra company.

== History ==
In 1969 Tatra decided to modernize the existing T138 model with a number of improvements and design changes. The new model series was designated T148. Designers were tasked with the requirements of increasing engine power, vehicle speed and reliability as well as meeting stricter noise and emission regulations.

== Design and technology ==
Yet again design continued with the proven central backbone tube construction and power train integrated into the central backbone tube as a modular concept in 4x4 and 6x6 configuration. A new feature was the inter-axle differential. The main advantages of the central load carrying backbone tube are in its high torsion and bend strength, which protects the truck body against load stresses. The secondary advantage is that it houses all important parts of the drive train as well as it enables a concept of modular construction where designers and customers can specify 4 and 6 wheel drive, as well as various length wheelbase combinations.

=== Engine ===
The significantly improved powerplant had its stroke lifted by 10 mm while the bore remained the same. The angle of the cylinder heads has changed to 90°. The supercharged or turbocharged versions tested in development with even more power and, more importantly, torque, did not make it into series production. So the displacement was lifted to 12.6 litres which resulted in at least in part increased horsepower and torque. For military variants the engines were capable of running on alternative fuels (mixtures of diesel fuel, gasoline and or aviation kerosine fuel), albeit with a performance loss. The air cooling system was retained once again with the cooling fan driven via hydraulic clutch and engine oil temperature controlled. The fuel injection pumps featured different types variable or combination governors depending on the vehicle application.

=== Chassis ===
Full length backbone tube with independent swing half axles in 4x4 and 6x6. On 6x6 models front axle suspension via adjustable torsion bars, rear axles suspended by longitudinal semi elliptic leaf springs. For 4x4 configuration rear axle was also suspended via torsion bars. Manually selectable front drive via homo-kinetic driveshafts, constant rear drive with the axle locks standard on all models.

- Front track = 1,966 mm (77.4 in)
- Rear track = 1,770 mm (69.7 in)
- Wheelbase = model specific
  - T148 S1, S3 = 3,690 mm (145.3 in)+1,320 mm (52.0 in)
  - T148 VNM = 4,260 mm (167.7 in)+1,320 mm (52.0 in)
  - T148 NTt 6x6 = 3,690 mm (145.3 in)+1,320 mm (52.0 in)
  - T148 NTt 4x4 = 3,875 mm (152.6 in)
- Ground clearance = 290 mm (11.4 in)

=== Transmission ===
The main gearbox was located behind the cabin and connected to the engine clutch housing via a short uni joint shaft (this design enables the so-called flat floor cabin) which was bolted together with the auxiliary gearbox to the backbone tube and formed the main part of the chassis structure. Options for rear power take off and winch drive were also possible. The main and auxiliary gears were fully synchronized except the first and reverse gear.

- Main gearbox – 5+1 (2-5 gear synchronized)
  - gear ratios – (1)9.97, (2)4.96, (3)2.83, (4)1.68, (5)1.0, (R)8.58
- Auxiliary gearbox – 2 speed (electro-pneumatic control via switch on the gear lever and clutch pedal activated )
  - gear ratios – (L)2.20, (H)1.62
- Step down transfer case
- Clutch – 2x plate dry (clutch pedal hydraulic and power assisted)
- Differentials – 1x front 2x rear (6x6 models) 1x front 1x rear (4x4 models)
  - final drive ratios – 3.39

=== Brakes ===
Full compressed air brakes acting on all wheels

- Main wheel brakes → dual circuit drum brakes adjustable "S" cam type
  - Park brake → mechanical via output shaft at the back of the gearbox
    - Supplementary brake → exhaust brake electro-pneumatically controlled

=== Bodywork ===
The Tatra T148 featured an all-steel two door cabin with a fully suspended drivers seat and a bench seat for two occupants. Special military variants included a hatch opening on the roof. The vehicle featured an independent auxiliary cab heater and included cyclone pre-cleaners mounted on the front mudguards. The vehicle's top speed was approximately 80 km/h up to 26,000 kg (57,320 lb) GVM (T148 S3) or a total truck and trailer combination of up to 38,000 kg (83,776 lb) GCM (T148 S3).

== Production ==
Production of the T148 started in 1972 and ended in December 1982 where a total of 113,647 vehicles left the production line. Total export figures rested at approximately 63,700 units sold in 43 countries around the world, where traditionally the biggest export user was the USSR.

== Variants ==
- Tatra T148 S1 (6x6) – One way tipper
- Tatra T148 S3 (6x6) – Three way tipper
- Tatra T148 V S1 (6x6) – High-lift one way tipper
- Tatra T148 V (6x6) – Flatbed civilian
- Tatra T148 VNM (6x6) – Flatbed w/winch troops and cargo military special
- Tatra T148 NTt (6x6) – Tractor
- Tatra T148 NTt (4x4) – Tractor
- Tatra T148 Pxx – Modular chassis for special use e.g. tanker, crane, excavator
- TZ-74 (6x6) – Decontamination vehicle used by the Czech, Slovak, and German Armies based on the Tatra T148 PPR 15 with a gas turbine mounted on the rear of the chassis alongside its decontaminating fluid and fuel tanks; besides decontaminating equipment, the turbine can also be used to create smoke screens
- TTZ-74-B (6x6) – Training version of the TZ-74
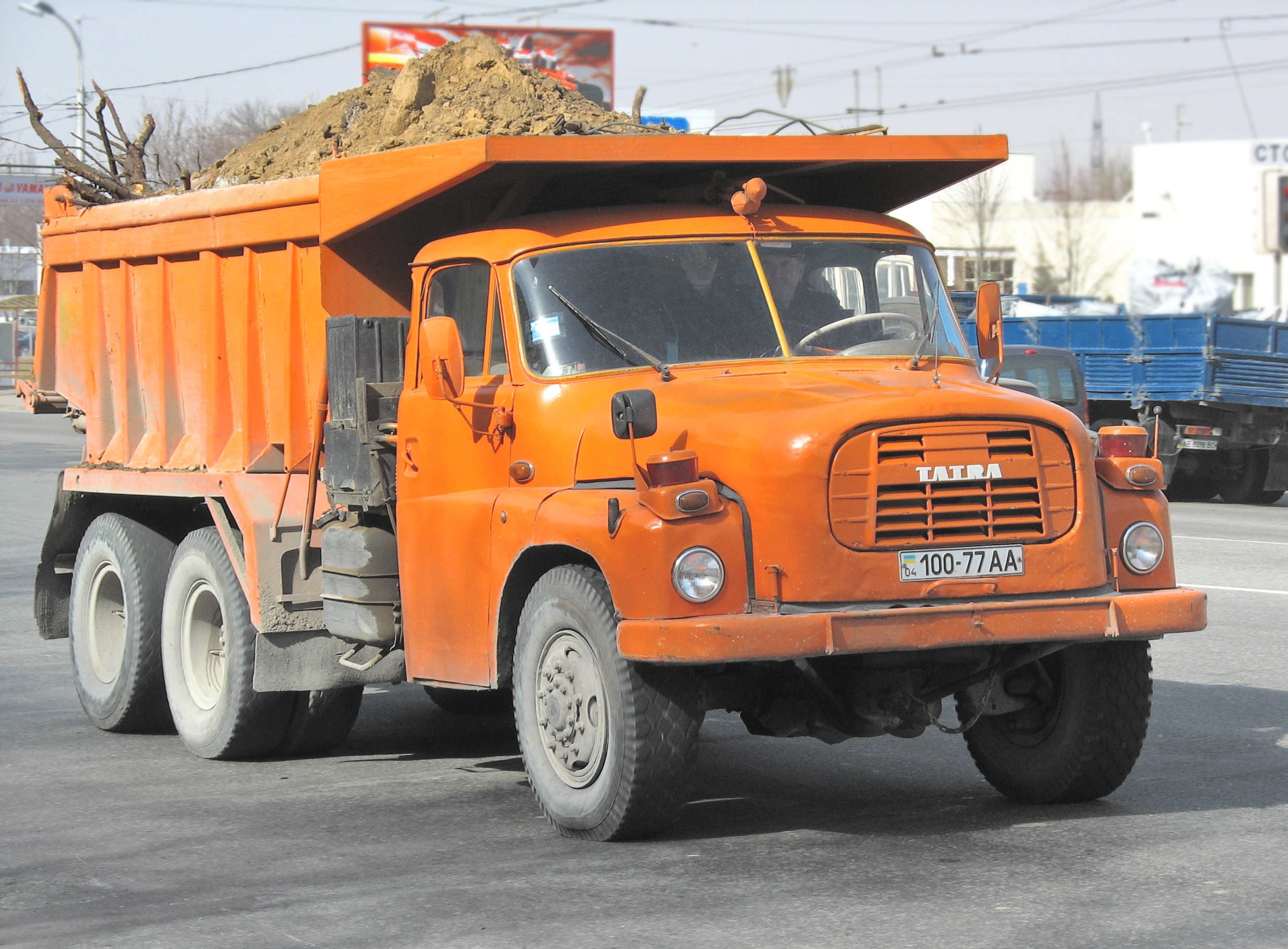
Tatra T148 S1 One way tipper

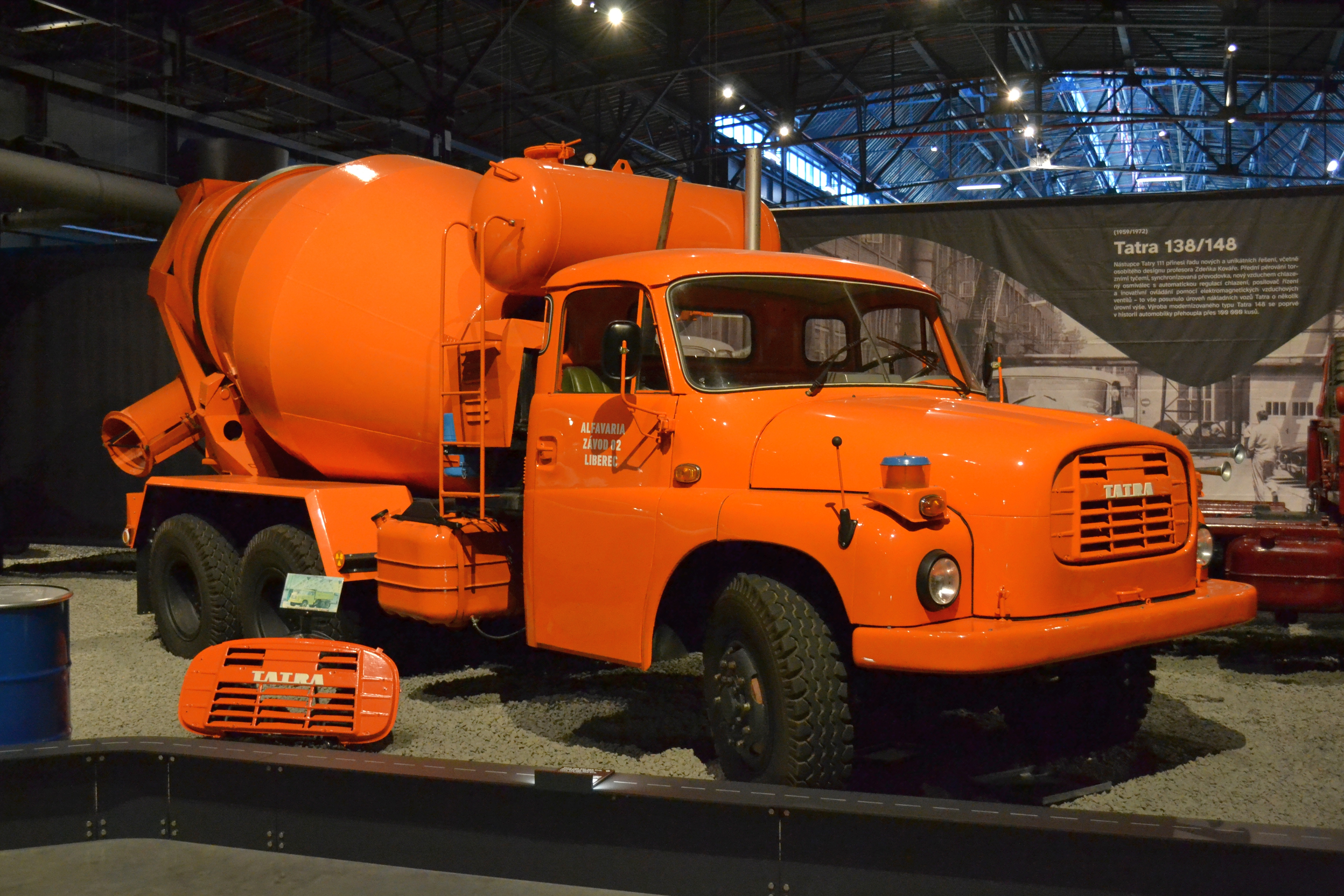
Tatra T148 Cement mixer truck

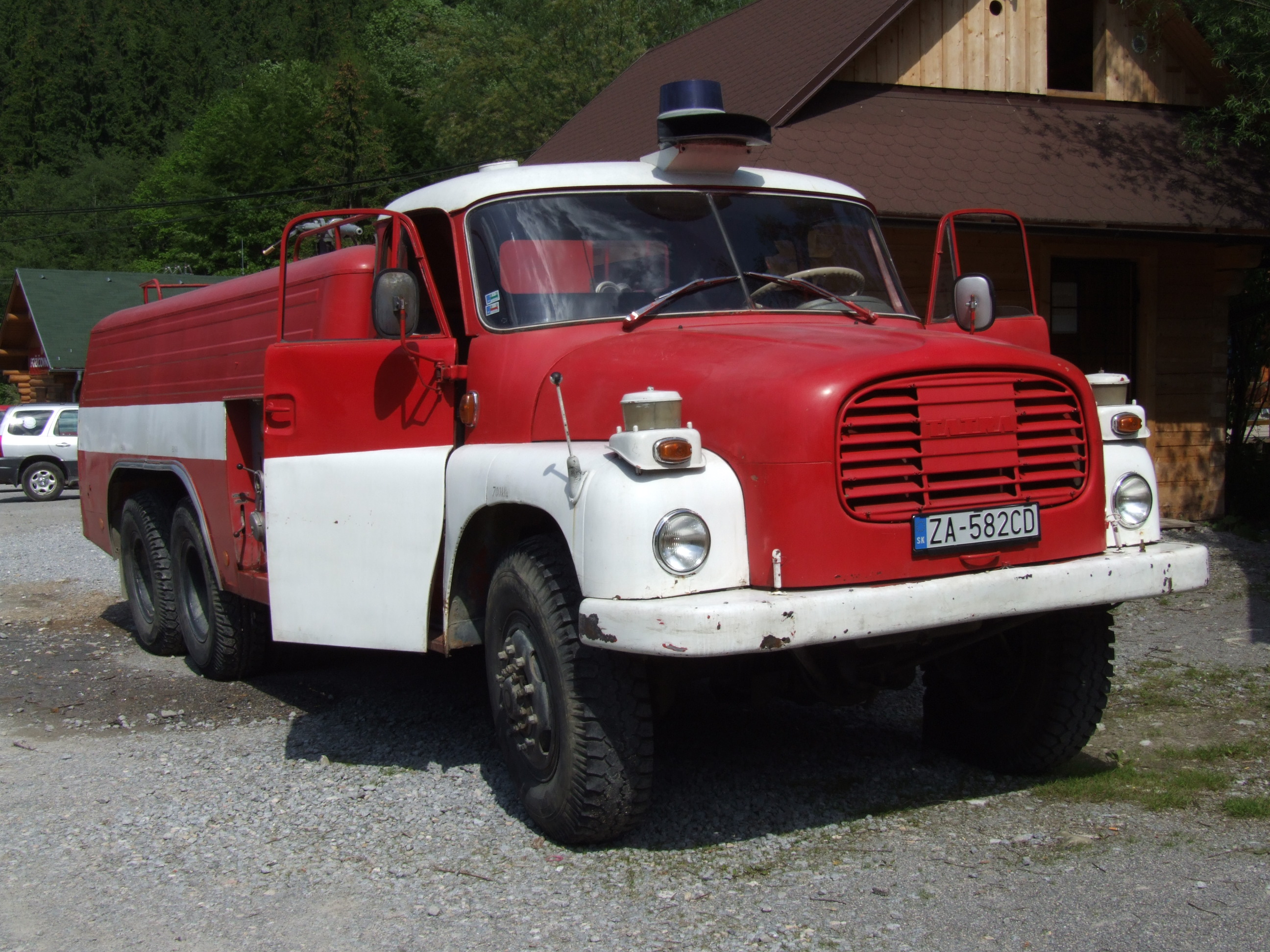
Tatra T148 Fire

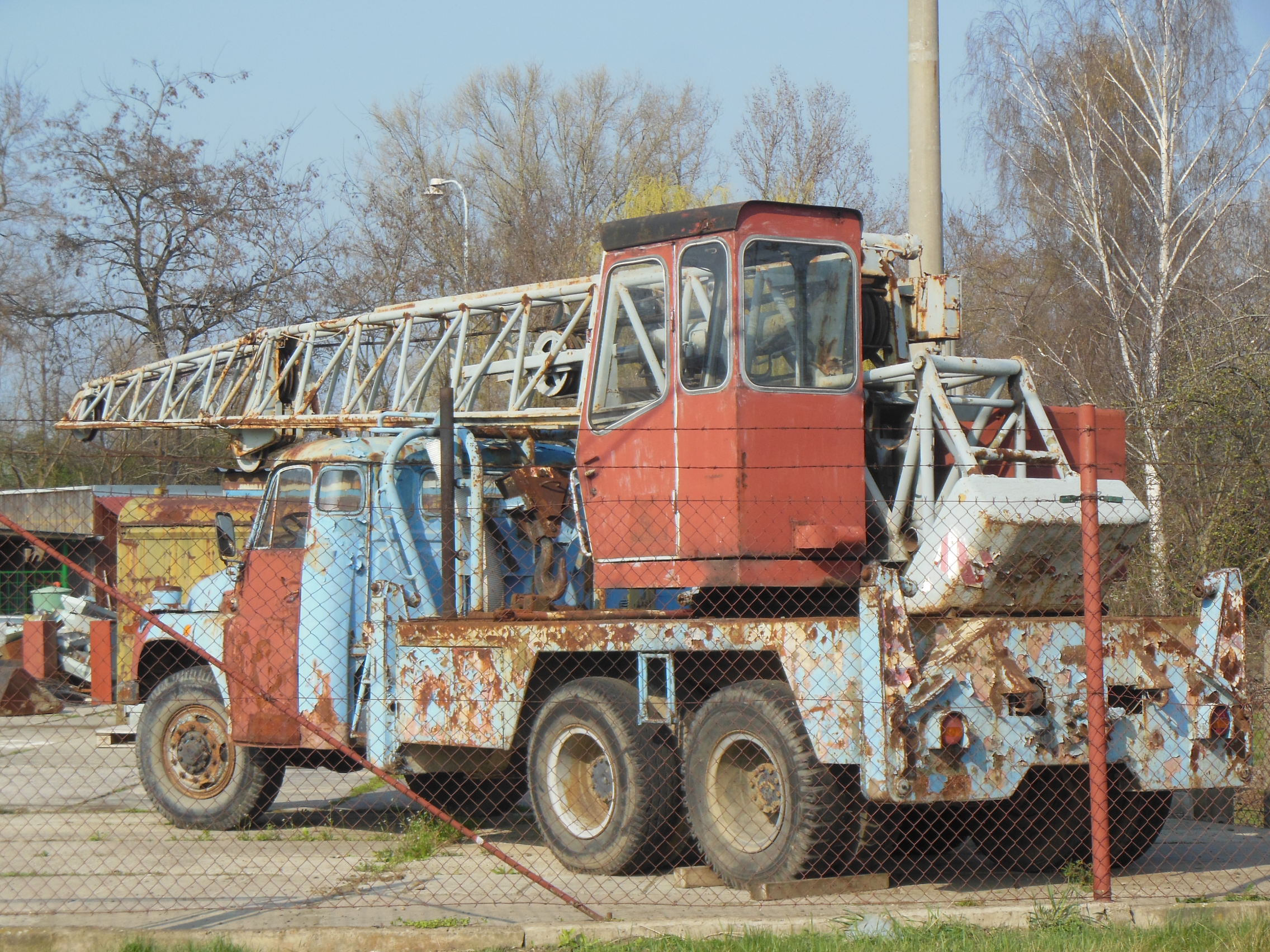
Tatra T148 Crane

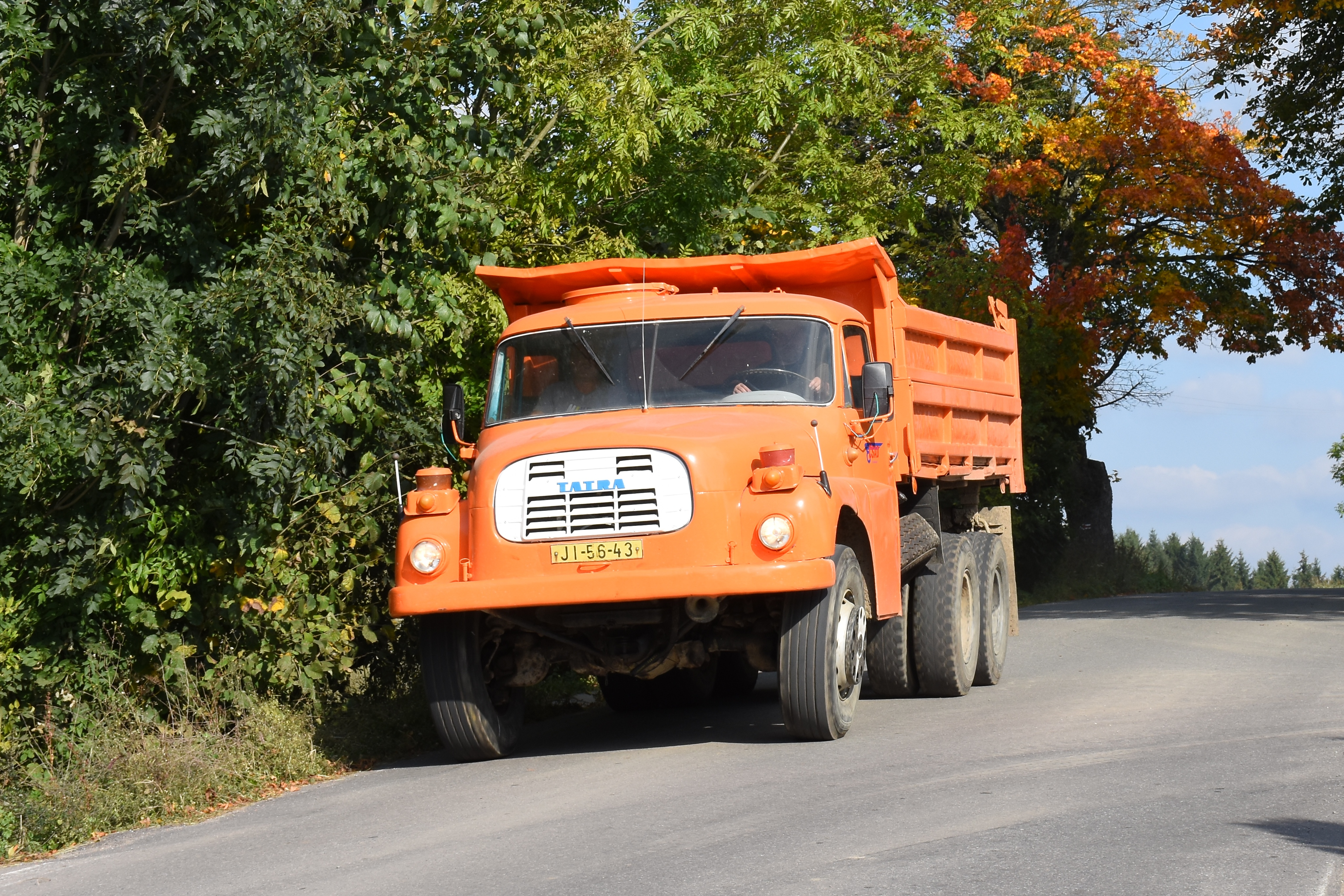
Tatra T148 S3 Three way tipper

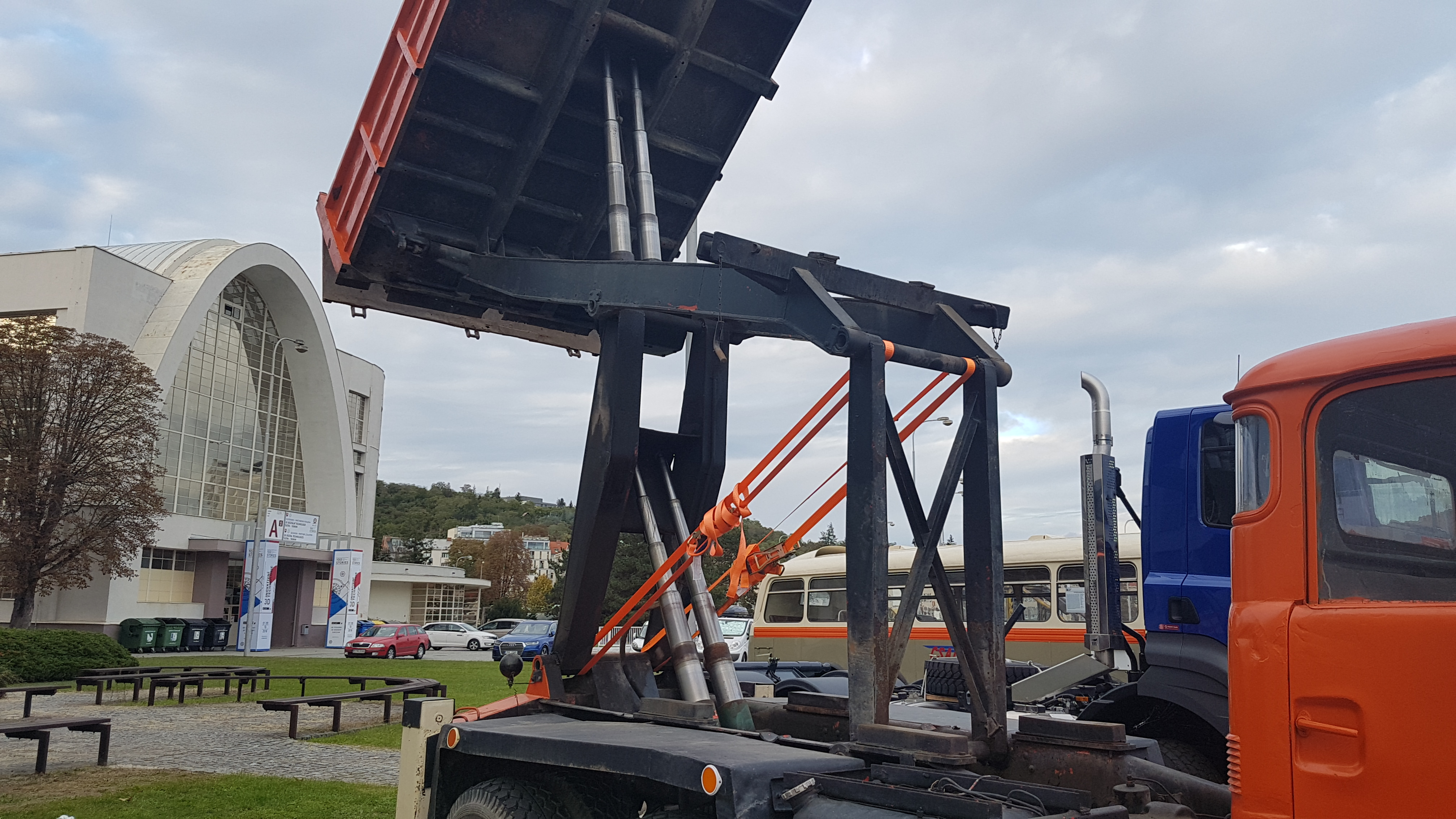
T148 V S1 High-lift one way tipper's lifting mechanism

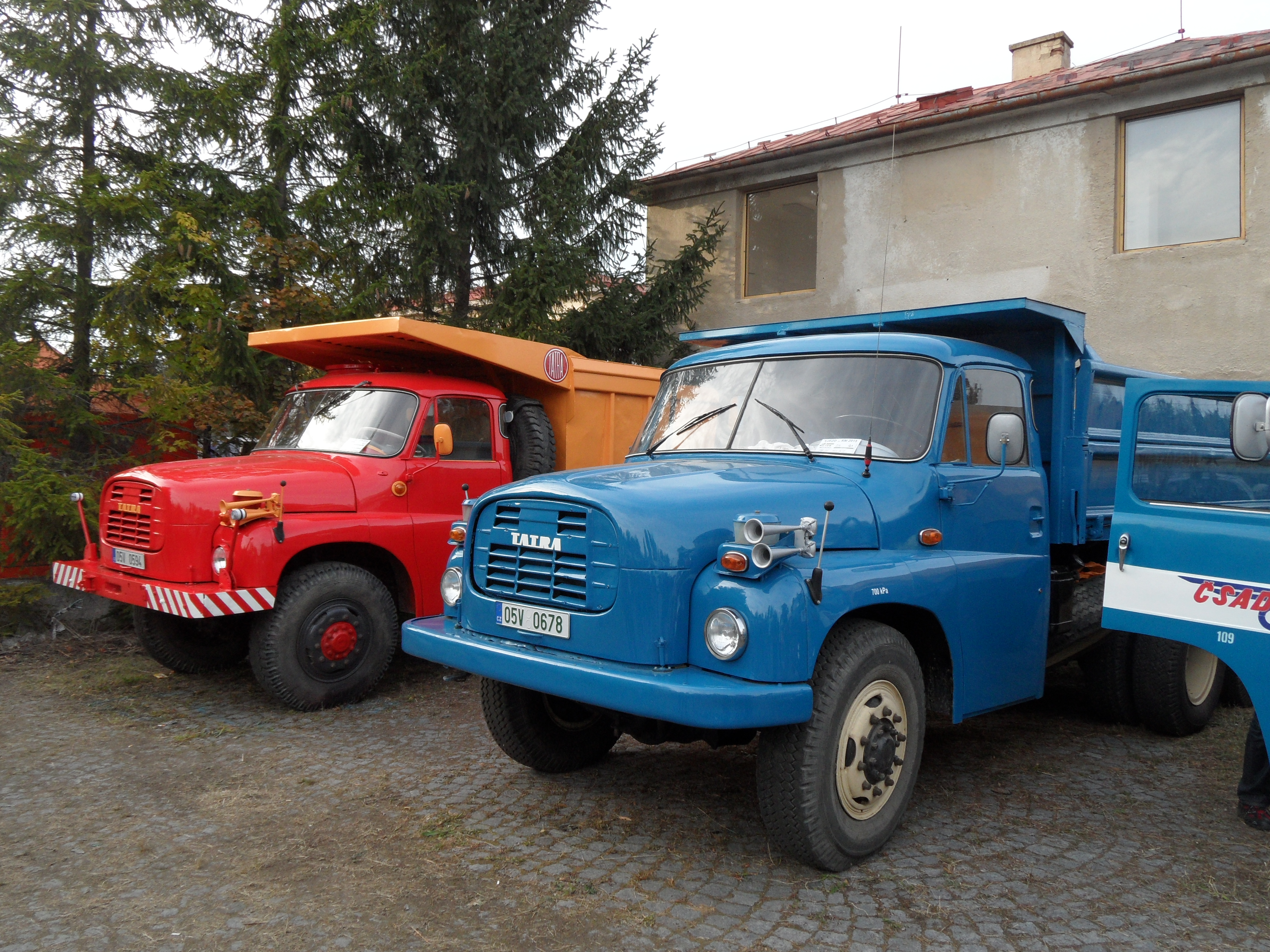
Tatra T148 S1 and T148 S3

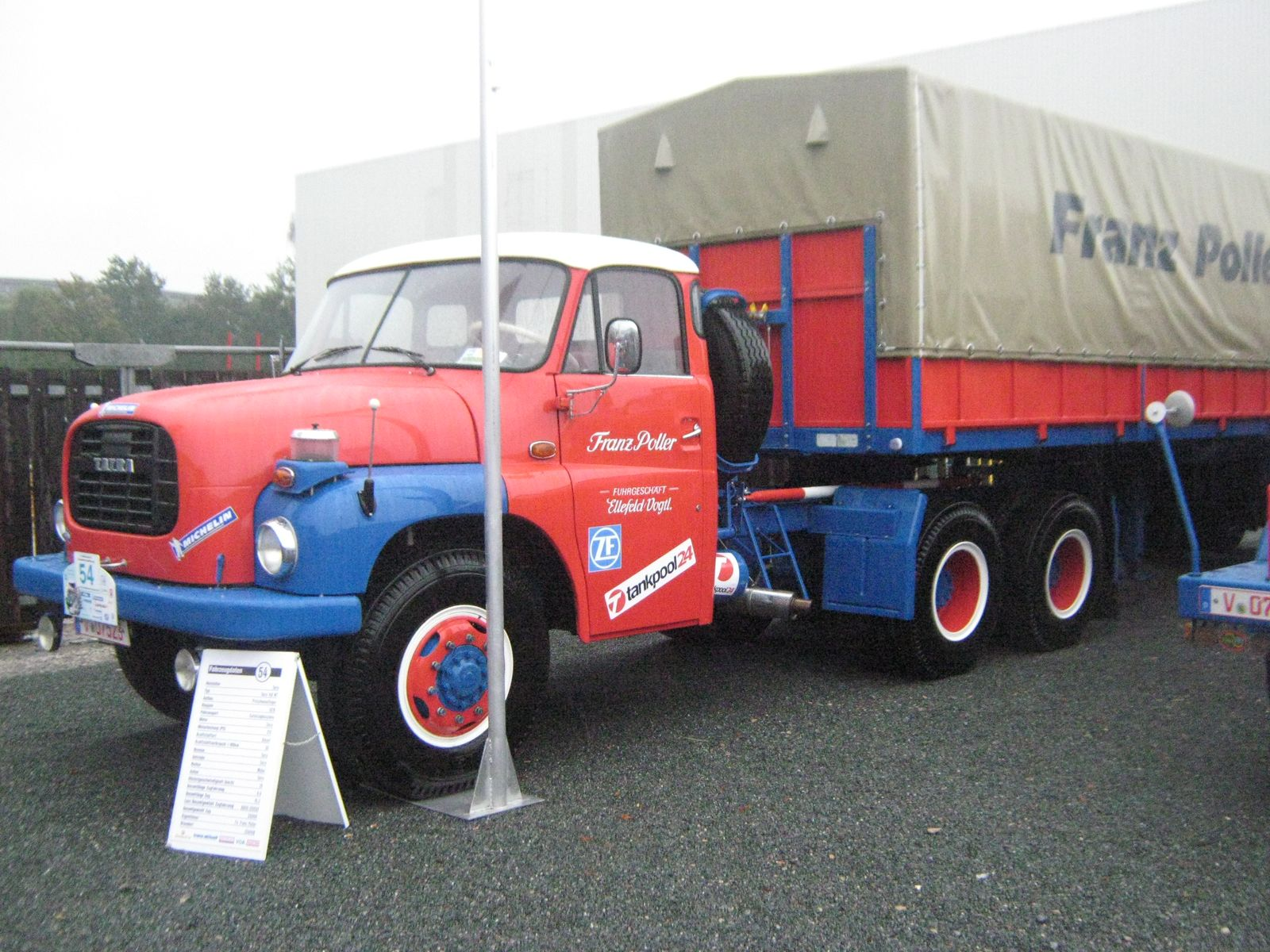
Tatra T148 NTt 6×6 Tractor

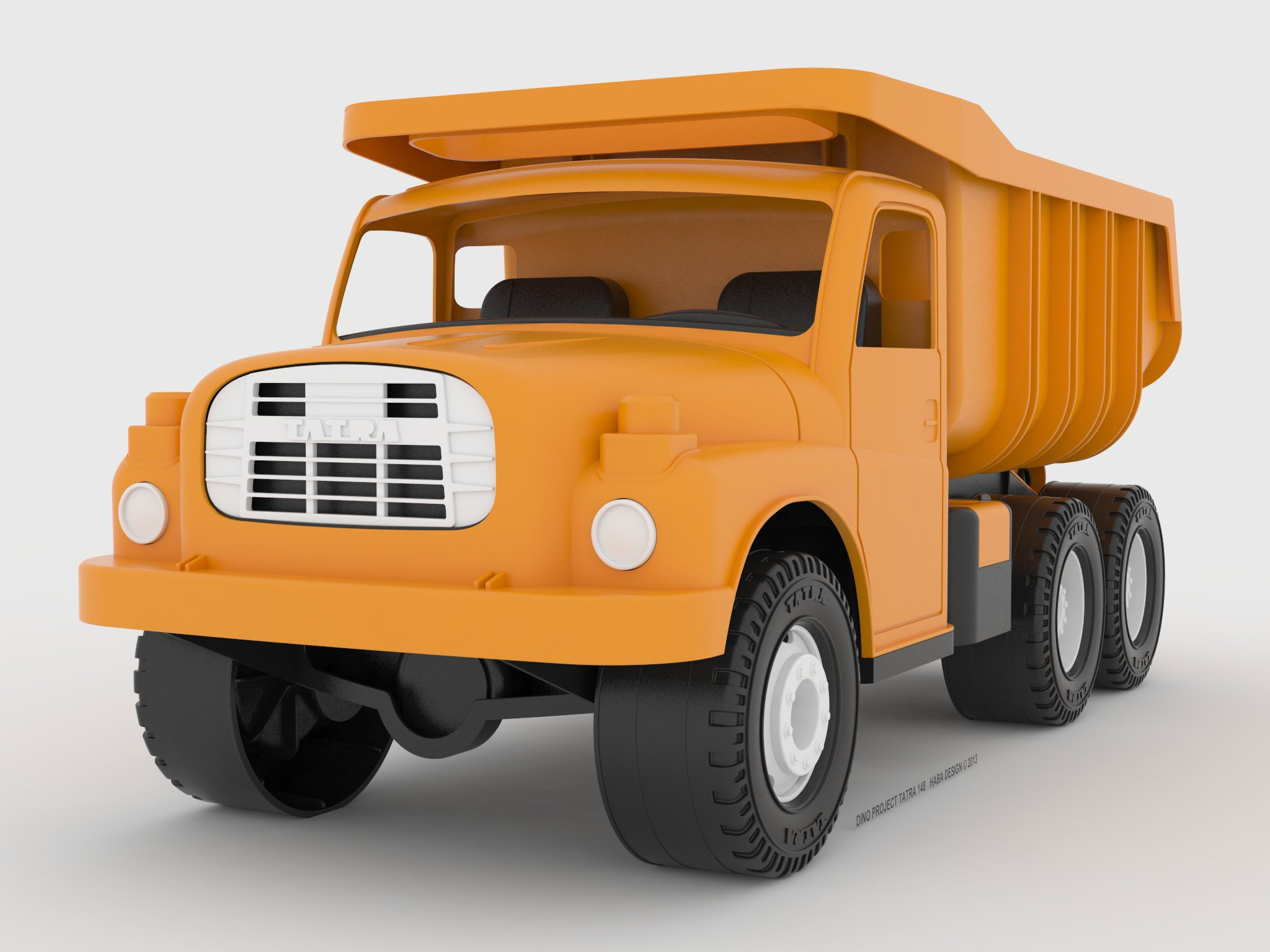
Tatra T148 S1 plastic toy
