= Tatra 81 =

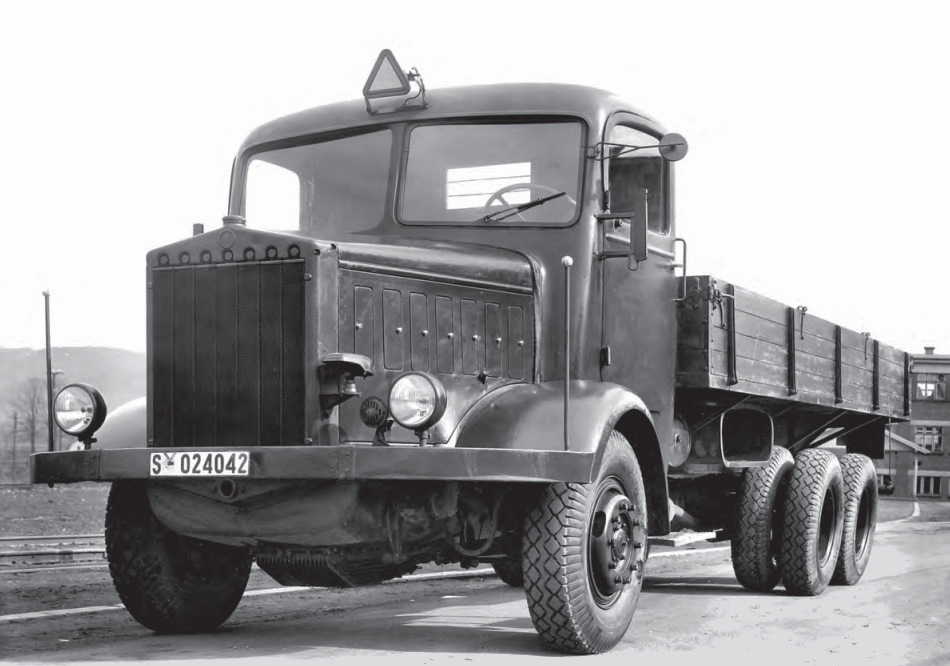
- Tatra 81

Overview
- Manufacturer: Tatra
- Production: 1939-1942; 220 produced

Body and chassis
- Class: Truck
- Body style: Conventional

Powertrain
- Engine: 12.5 L Tatra 81 V8 diesel (T81); 14.8 L Tatra 81HB V8 (T81H, T81HB)

Dimensions
- Wheelbase: 5,170 mm (203.5 in)
- Length: 8.9 m (29 ft)
- Width: 2.5 m (8.2 ft)
- Height: 2.8 m (9.2 ft)
- Curb weight: 12,200 kg (26,900 lb)

Chronology
- Successor: Tatra 111

The Tatra 81 was heavy-duty truck model made by Czech manufacturer Tatra between 1940 and 1942. The development was ordered by German government in the aftermath of the German occupation of Czechoslovakia in 1939 and was complete the same year. It was mainly used in Germany by Ordnungspolizei, but few were utilized by Wehrmacht to ferry supplies.

The vehicle had an 8-cylinder diesel engine with 12,467 cc (12.467 L) rated to 117.8 kW (158.0 hp) power. It had 4 forward gears and 1 reverse gear. The truck chassis, based on the Tatra backbone chassis conception, has 5,700 kg (12,600 lb) empty weight. The truck was rated for 6,500 kg (14,300 lb) payload. The Tatra 81 was capable of traveling at 65 km/h (40 mph).

The civilian use Tatra 81H and Tatra 81HB were fitted with wood gas generator and a 14726 cc, 110.4 kW (148.0 hp) power engine working on wood gas. To avoid drastic reduction of the engine power, the pistons diameter was increased by 10 mm (0.39 in).
