= Volvo Cars =

Swedish multinational manufacturer of luxury vehicles

Volvo Car AB

- Headquarters in Gothenburg, Sweden
- Native name: Volvo Personvagnar AB
- Type: Public
- Traded as: Nasdaq Stockholm: VOLCAR B
- Industry: Automotive
- Founded: 1927; 99 years ago
- Headquarters: Gothenburg, Sweden
- Area served: Worldwide
- Key people: Li Shufu (chairman); Håkan Samuelsson (CEO)
- Products: Luxury cars
- Production output: ▲710,042 vehicles (2025)
- Revenue: ▼357.3 billion kr (2025)
- Operating income: ▼12.5 billion kr (2025)
- Net income: ▼14.066 billion kr (2023)
- Total assets: ▲356.362 billion kr (2023)
- Total equity: ▲130.485 billion kr (2023)
- Number of employees: ▼42,600 (2025)
- Parent: Geely Holding (78.7%)
- Subsidiaries: HaleyTek (60%); NOVO Energy (50%); Polestar (18%); Zenseact (100%)
- Website: volvocars.com

Volvo Car AB (Swedish: [ˈvɔlːvʊ kɑːr oːˈbeː]), trading as Volvo Cars (Swedish: Volvo personvagnar, pronounced [ˈvɔlːvʊ pæˈʂuːnˌvɑŋːnar]; styled VOLVO in the company's logo), is a Swedish multinational manufacturer of luxury vehicles. Volvo is headquartered in Torslanda, Gothenburg. The company manufactures SUVs, station wagons, and sedans. The company's main marketing revolves around safety and its Swedish heritage and design.

Volvo Cars has been separate from its former parent conglomerate and producer of heavy trucks, buses, and construction equipment (among others) AB Volvo since 1999 when AB Volvo sold its automobile division Volvo Cars to the Ford Motor Company for US$6.47 billion. On 28 March 2010, Ford sold Volvo Cars at a loss to Geely Holding for $1.8 billion; the deal closed in August 2010. Volvo Cars was publicly listed on the Nasdaq Stockholm stock exchange in 2021, though Geely Holding still retains majority ownership. Volvo Cars and AB Volvo share the Volvo logo, and cooperate in running the Volvo Museum.

Volvo Cars owns 18% of Polestar and 50% of NOVO Energy (electric vehicle batteries), 100% of Zenseact (AD and ADAS software), and 100% of HaleyTek (Android-based infotainment systems). As of 2022, Volvo Cars has production plants in Torslanda in Sweden, Ridgeville, South Carolina, in the United States, Ghent in Belgium, and Daqing in China.

== History ==
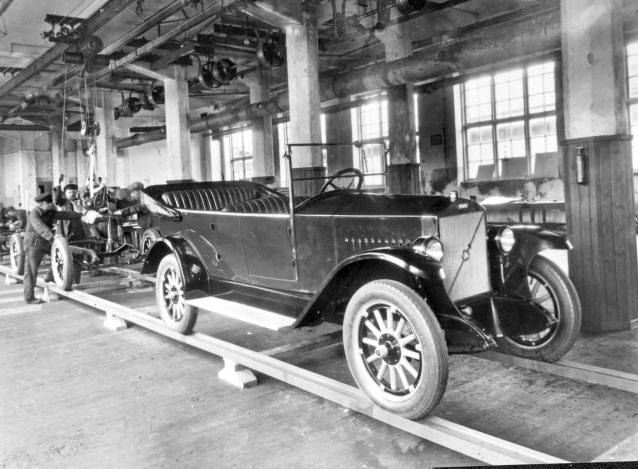
The first Volvo car that left the assembly line the 14 April 1927 was called Volvo ÖV 4

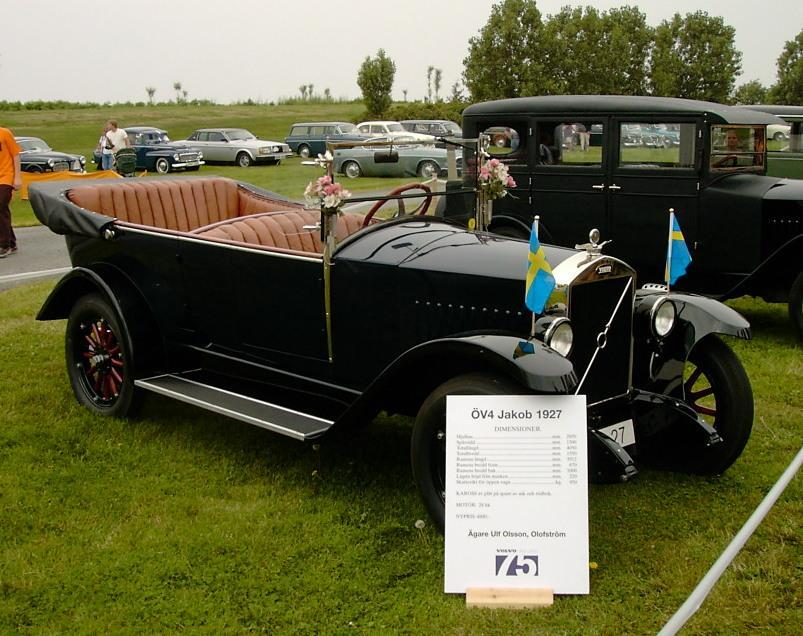
Restored Volvo ÖV 4, picture taken in 2006

=== 1927–1999 ===
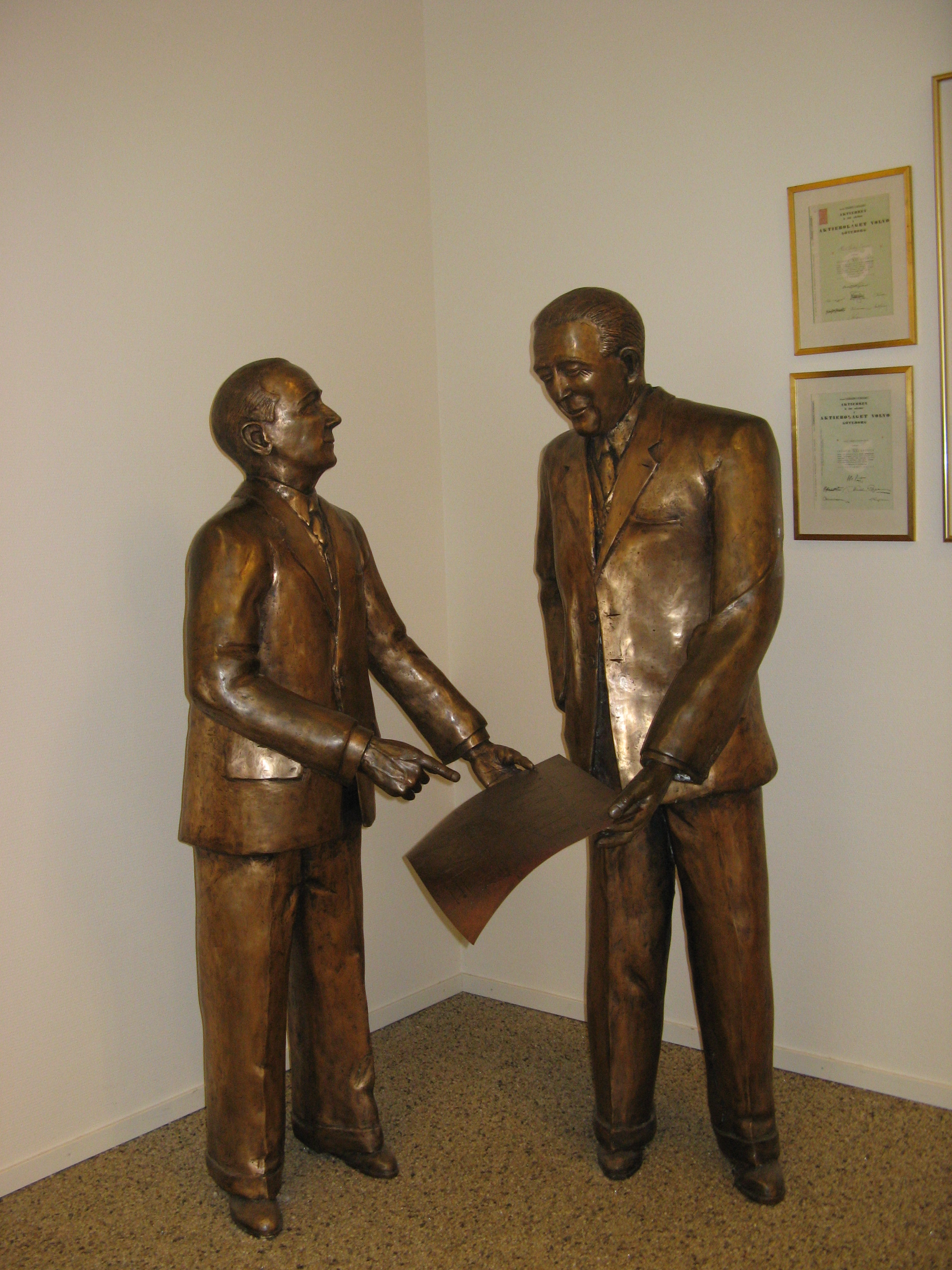
Bronze statue of Gustav Larson and Assar Gabrielsson at the Volvo Museum in Gothenburg

Volvo was founded upon the concept of safety in 1927, in Gothenburg, Sweden:

Cars are driven by people. The guiding principle behind everything we make at Volvo, therefore, is and must remain, safety.

— Assar Gabrielsson and Gustav Larson, 1927

The company was created as a subsidiary to SKF. Assar Gabrielsson was appointed managing director and Gustav Larson technical manager.

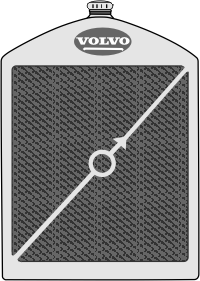
Volvo logotype in 1927

The trademark Volvo (which is Latin for 'I roll') was first registered by SKF on 11 May 1915 with the intention to use it for a special series of ball bearing for the American market but it was never used for this purpose (however in the application for the trademark, it was also designated for the purpose of automobiles). The SKF trademark as it looks today was used instead for all SKF products. Some pre-series of Volvo-bearings stamped with the brand name 'Volvo' were manufactured but never released to the market, and it was not until 1927 that the trademark was used again, now as a trademark and company name for an automobile.

The first Volvo car left the assembly line on 14 April 1927, and was called the Volvo ÖV 4. After this the young company produced closed top and cabriolet vehicles, which were designed to hold strong in the Swedish climate and terrain. In the registration application for the Volvo logotype in 1927, it simply made a copy of the entire radiator for the ÖV 4, viewed from the front. The round logo with the arrow pointing to the right (♂) is the Greek alchemical symbol for iron.

Presented in 1944, the Volvo PV444 passenger car only entered production in 1947. It was the smallest Volvo yet, but became Volvo's most produced car, and spearheaded Volvo's move into the profitable American market. The first Volvos arrived in the United States in 1955, after the hardware wholesaler Leo Hirsh began distributing cars in California. Later, Texas was added, and in 1956, Volvo themselves began importing cars to the US. North America has consistently provided Volvo with its main outlet since.

Early Volvo export.

In 1963, Volvo opened the Volvo Halifax Assembly plant, the first assembly plant in the company's history outside of Sweden, in Halifax, Nova Scotia, Canada. In 1964, Volvo opened its Torslanda plant in Sweden, which currently is one of its largest production sites (chiefly large cars and SUVs). Then in 1965, the Ghent, Belgium plant was opened, which is the company's second largest production site. This was also Volvo's first location producing cars within the European Economic Community. In 1989, the Uddevalla plant in Sweden was opened, which was jointly operated by Volvo Car Group and Pininfarina Sverige AB from 2005 to 2013.

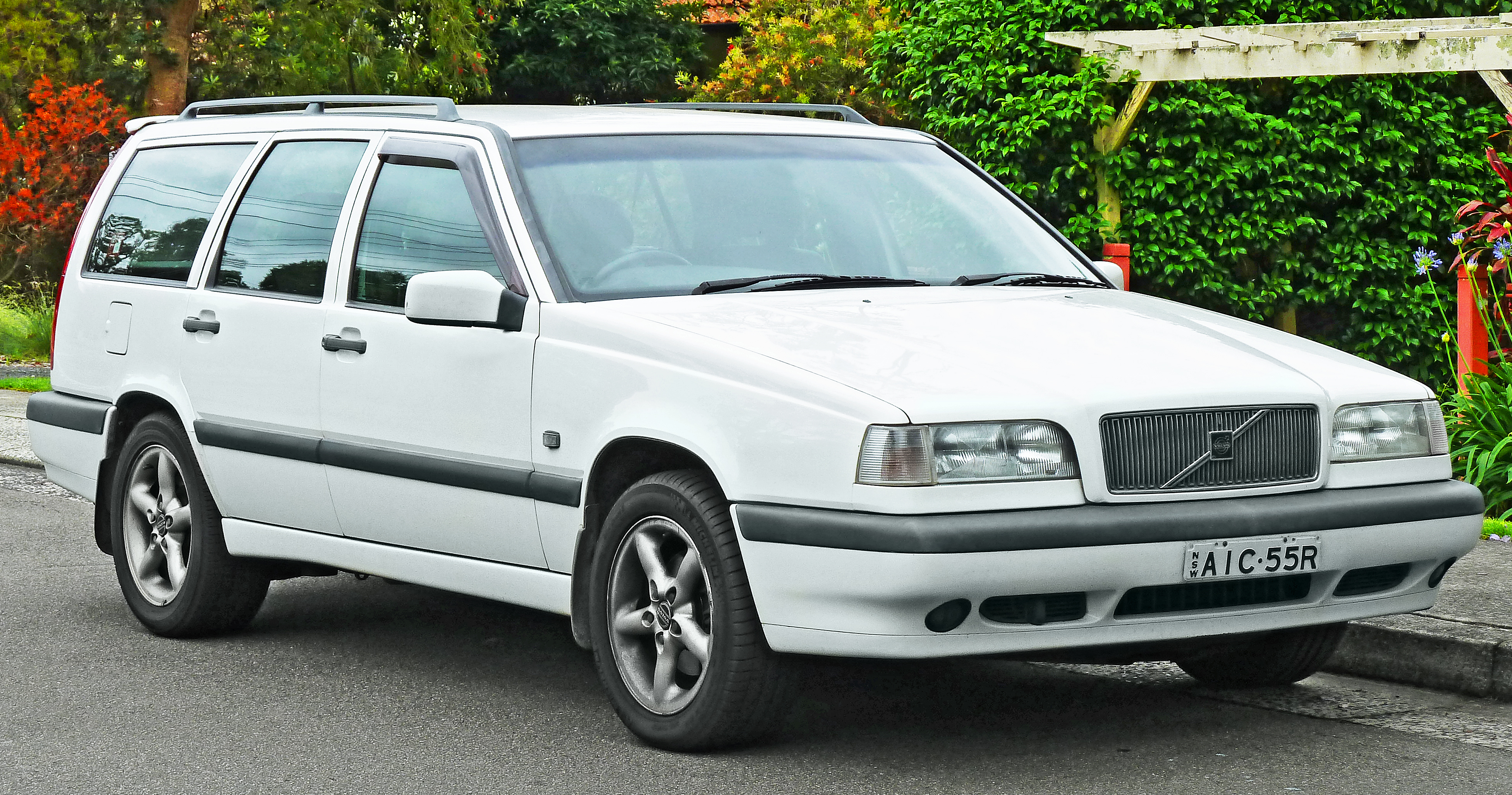
1997 Volvo 850 estate

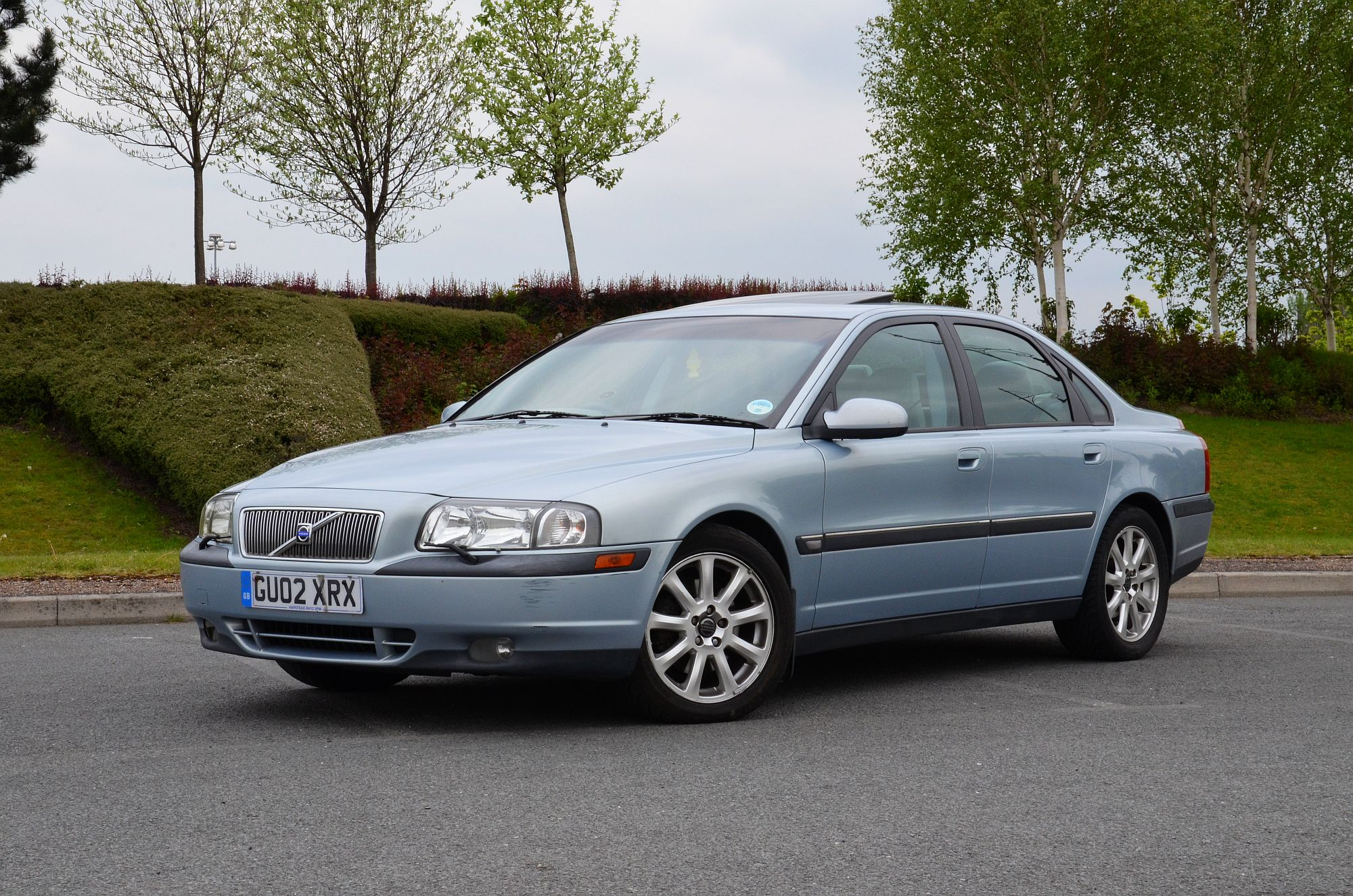
2002 Volvo S80

In the early 1970s, Volvo acquired the passenger car division of the Dutch company DAF, and marketed its small cars as Volvos before releasing the Dutch-built Volvo 340, which went on to be a big seller in the UK market in the 1980s. In 1986 Volvo sold 113,267 cars in the US marking a record year for the company. The appearance of Japanese brands like Acura and Lexus and the growing popularity of Subaru station wagons in subsequent years meant the loss of a significant market share for Volvo, one which it has never regained.

Volvo's long-time CEO Pehr G. Gyllenhammar saw early on that Volvo was too small to survive in the future, and attempted several times to merge with other manufacturers. Volvo nearly merged with Saab in the late seventies, while in 1978 an aborted affair would have seen the Norwegian state take over 40 percent of the company. In return, Volvo would receive 200 million SEK and a ten percent concession in the Oseberg oil field. Major institutional actors in Sweden opposed the deal and blocked it. A deal to merge with Renault was blocked in 1993, mainly opposed by a Swedish stockholders' association.

A collection of Volvo's most important historical vehicles are now housed in the Volvo Museum, which opened in a permanent location in Arendal at Hisingen on 30 May 1995. For several years, the collection had been housed at the Blue Hangar, at the then closed Torslanda Airport.

In 1999, Volvo Group decided to sell its automobile manufacturing business in order to concentrate on commercial vehicles, and to buy a 5% stake in Japanese automaker Mitsubishi Motors (with which Volvo Group along with the Dutch government had participated in a joint venture at the former DAF plant in Born, Netherlands since 1991). Ford saw advantages in acquiring a profitable prestige mid-size European automobile manufacturer, renowned for its safety aspects, as an addition to its Premier Automotive Group. The buyout of Volvo Cars was announced on 28 January 1999, and in the following year the acquisition was completed at a price of US$6.45 billion. As a result of the divestiture, the Volvo trademark was used by two separate companies:

- Volvo Group – a manufacturer of trucks, buses and construction equipment (among others) owned by Swedish interests
- Volvo Car Group or Volvo Cars – a manufacturer of automobiles owned by Ford Motor Company

Volvo Group completed its 5% deal with Mitsubishi in November 1999, but sold its stake back to Mitsubishi Heavy Industries in March 2001.

=== Ford era (1999–2010) ===
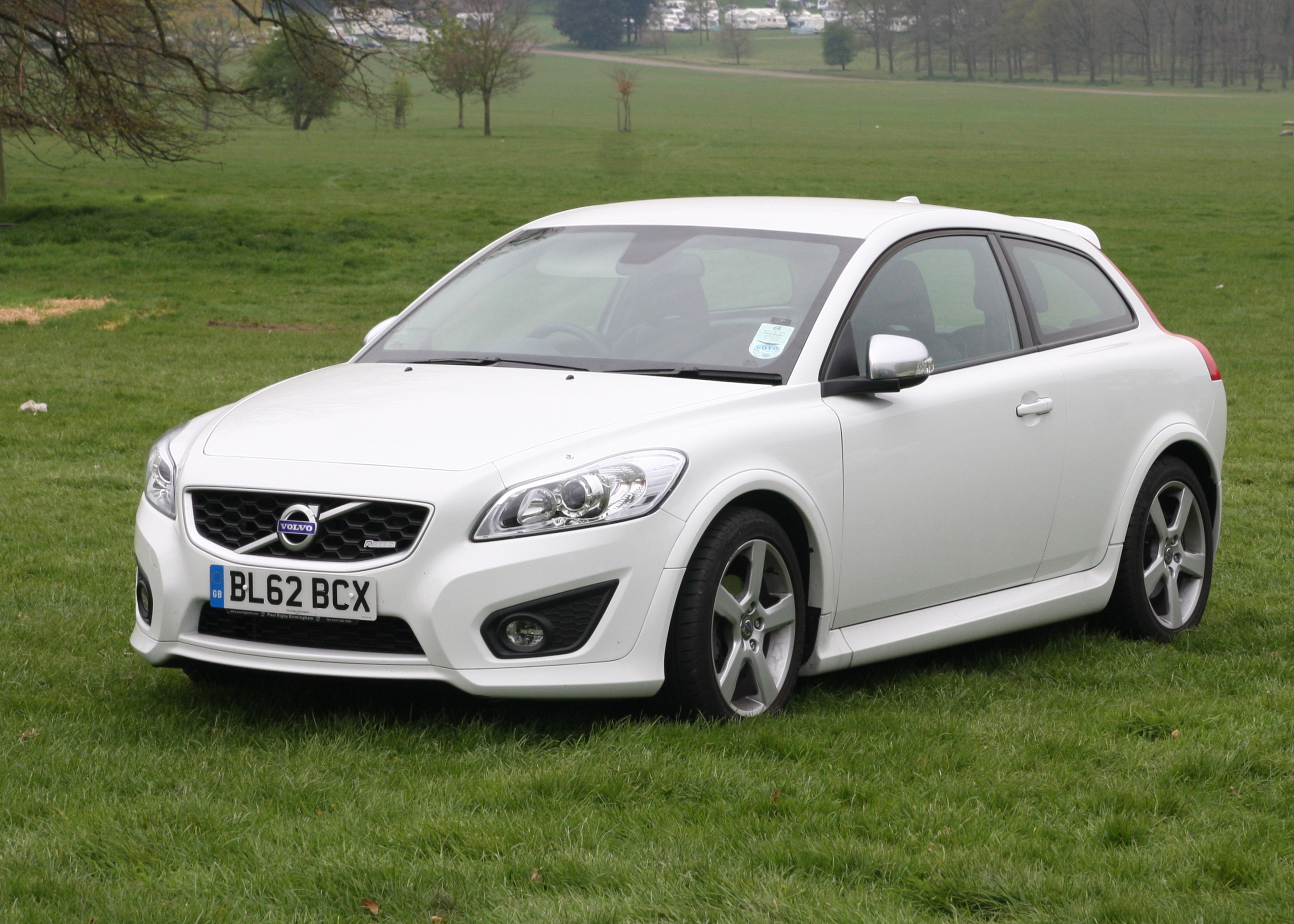
The Volvo C30 is one example of a Volvo produced under Ford ownership.

Volvo Car Group was part of Ford Motor Company's Premier Automotive Group (PAG), along with Jaguar, Aston Martin and Land Rover. While part of the PAG, the company significantly expanded its range of vehicles. Ford, in turn, attempted with little market success to leverage synergies from Volvo, namely by sharing a re-engineered platform and many safety features from the Volvo S80 with the Ford Five Hundred (et al.).

After Ford sold Jaguar Land Rover to Tata Motors of India in 2008, the company initially decided to keep Volvo Cars despite mounting losses and major economic downturns. Ford decided to restructure plans for Volvo Cars, pushing it further upmarket, alongside the lower end of Mercedes and BMW sedans, wagons, and SUV crossovers. The outcome was the luxurious second generation Volvo S80 and the new small premium crossover Volvo XC60.

When the global economic crisis of 2008 threatened US automakers, Swedish authorities became concerned about the fate of Volvo, should Ford file for bankruptcy. These concerns mounted after repeated mass layoffs at Volvo. In December 2008, Ford announced that it was considering selling Volvo Cars. Initially, a sale price of US$6 billion was reported. Ford said it was also looking into the possibility of spinning off Volvo as an independent company. The Swedish government was asked to look into a possible state ownership of Volvo, or a financial bailout for Volvo Cars and SAAB of GM. Former parent AB Volvo agreed to help Volvo cut costs through partnerships, and suggested taking part in a shared ownership of Volvo Cars, as part of a larger consortium. Other rumored candidates to purchase Volvo Cars included BMW AG of Germany, Investor AB of Sweden, Chinese investors, and Russian investors.

Although it was rumoured that Volkswagen would buy Volvo Cars, and despite initial denials, the company Geely Holding Group was ultimately selected to take over the Swedish automaker. Geely Holding allegedly bid about US$1.5 billion to take over Volvo, with Goldman Sachs investing HK$2.59 billion (US$334 million) in the holding company.

=== Geely era (2010–present) ===
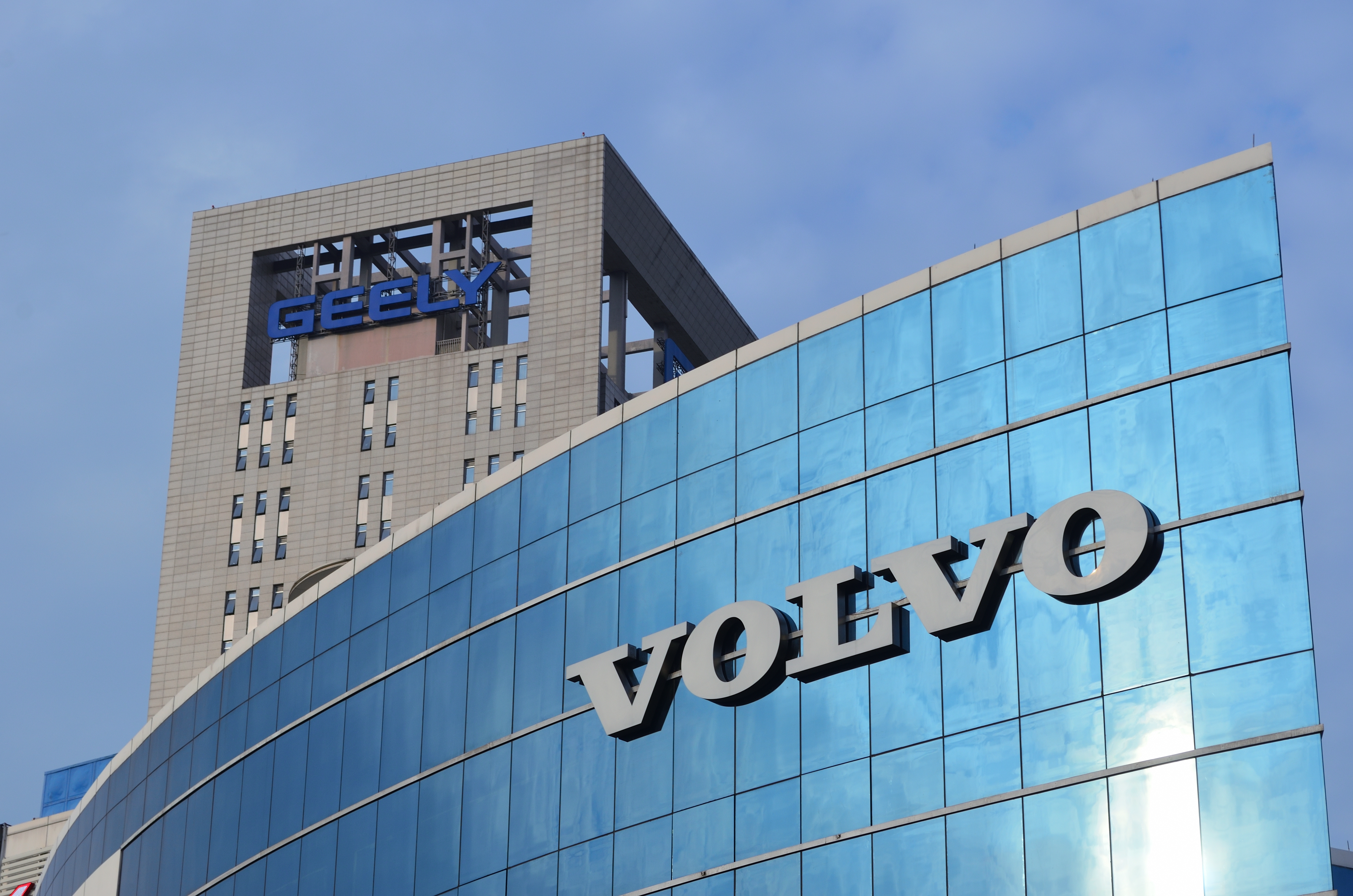
Volvo office in Hangzhou (with Geely headquarters in the background)

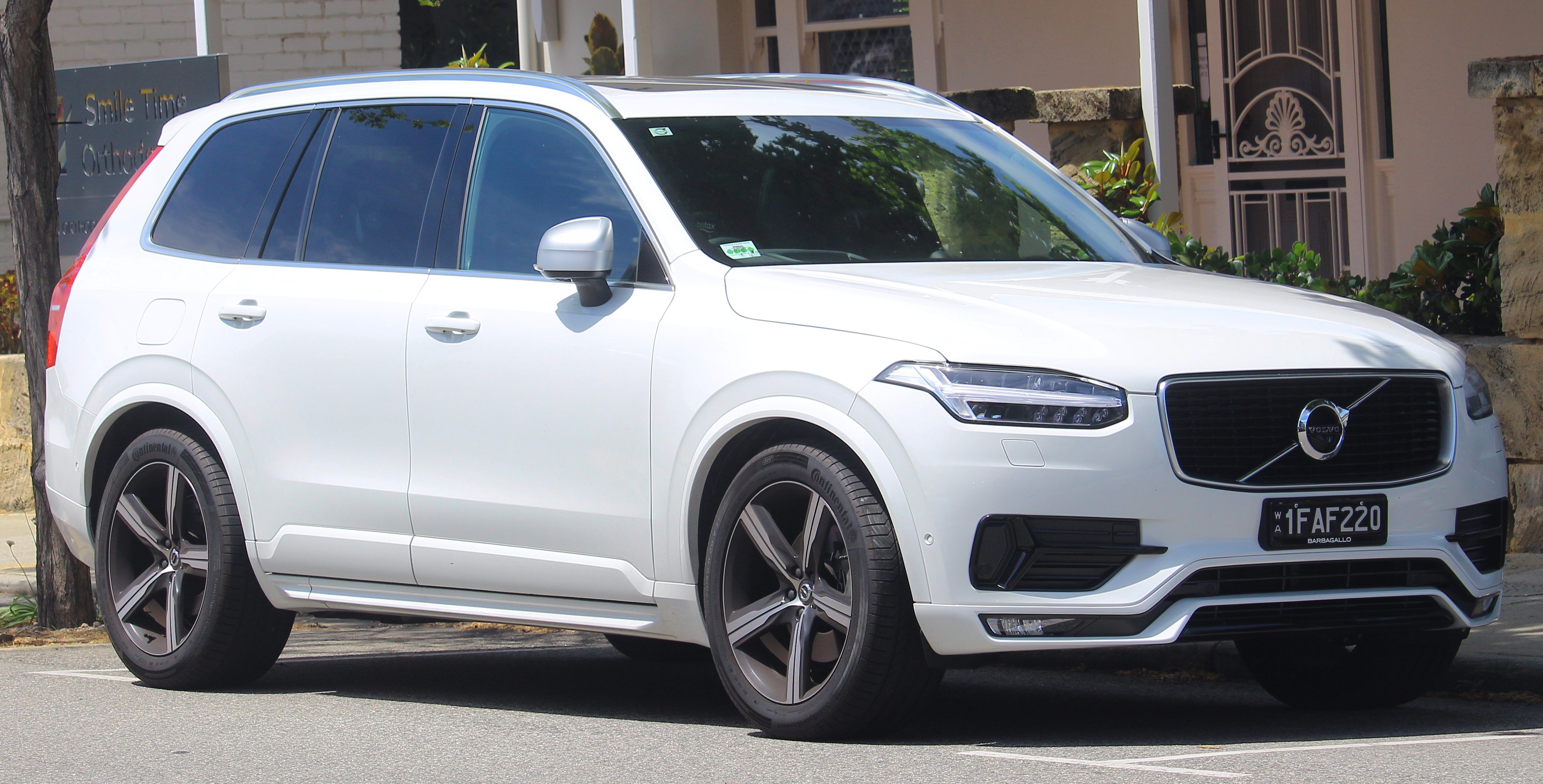
2016 Volvo XC90, the first Volvo vehicle developed fully under Geely ownership

Volvo logo from 2015 to 2021

Ford Motor Company offered Volvo Cars for sale in December 2008, after suffering losses that year. On 28 October 2009, Ford confirmed that, after considering several offers, the preferred buyer of Volvo Cars was Geely Holding Group, the parent of motor manufacturer Geely Automobile. On 23 December 2009, Ford confirmed the terms of the sale to Geely had been settled. A definitive agreement was signed on 28 March 2010, for US$1.8 billion. The European Commission and China's Ministry of Commerce approved the deal on 6 and 29 July 2010, respectively. The deal closed on 2 August 2010 with Geely paying $1.3 billion cash and a $200 million note. Further payments are expected with a later price "true-up". It is the largest overseas acquisition by a Chinese automaker.

Stefan Jacoby, formerly chief executive of Volkswagen of America, became Volvo Car Group's president and chief executive on 16 August 2010, replacing Stephen Odell, who became chief executive of Ford Europe. Li Shufu became Volvo Cars' chairman of the board. His board members include vice-chairman Hans-Olov Olsson, a former president and chief executive of Volvo Cars, and Håkan Samuelsson, formerly chief executive of MAN.

Under Geely ownership, Volvo has refocused its product lineup. The manufacturer has developed a new line of 3- and 4-cylinder diesel and petrol engines while eliminating larger engines. It has also developed a new vehicle platform, the Scalable Product Architecture (SPA), and re-introduced an expanded -90 series of models, including the S90 sedan and Volvo V90 wagon in addition to a redesigned XC90 SUV.

In 2015, Volvo sold more than half a million cars for the first time in its 89-year history. Volvo reported strong sales from all three core global regions. Sales in Europe rose 10% in 2015 to 269k, representing over 50% of total global volume. Volvo's revival in the US gained momentum, with sales up 24% in 2015, while China was flat amid a challenging sales environment, but sales were up 11% in the fourth quarter.

In July 2017, the automaker announced that beginning in 2019, all of its new models will include an electric motor in their powertrain. Implementation of the announcement could mean Volvo becoming the first manufacturer to end production of internal combustion-only vehicles, with all vehicles hybrid or electric powered. Between 2019 and 2021, Volvo plans to launch three electric cars under the Volvo brand and two more under the Polestar performance brand.

Volvo is one of the proponents of autonomous vehicles. On 20 November 2017, Uber announced that it planned to buy up to 24,000 Volvo cars designed to accept autonomous technology between 2019 and 2021. This non-binding intent includes a plan for Uber Advanced Technologies Group to design and build the self-driving system in the XC90 SUV. In 2016, the companies announced that they planned to collaborate on the design and financing of cars with self-driving systems. Such vehicles require a different type of steering and braking mechanism, as well as sensors. The CEO of Volvo Cars, Håkan Samuelsson, made this comment in an interview: "We get support developing this car ... It’s also a big commercial deal."

Also in 2017, Volvo announced a vehicle subscription offering called Care by Volvo, which offers the Volvo XC40 for a monthly payment that includes insurance and maintenance. Care by Volvo is offered in several European markets, such as Germany, the UK and Italy, as well as in the U.S.

In February 2020, Volvo and Geely announced that it had started formal discussions about a merger of business. Geely had owned 100% of Volvo, but Volvo Cars had largely been allowed autonomy with its resources. These merger talks were later halted, and 18% of Volvo Cars shares were listed on the Nasdaq Stockholm stock exchange in October 2021.

In early 2021 the company announced plans to completely stop selling fossil fuel-based cars by 2030, switching to electric-powered cars. The plan includes phasing out fossil-fuel-only cars by 2025, manufacturing only electric cars or hybrids.

In June 2021, Volvo Cars and Swedish battery developer and manufacturer Northvolt announced its intention to establish a 50/50 joint venture consisting of a battery gigafactory and R&D (research and development) center. In December 2021, it was revealed the battery R&D center would be located in Gothenburg. In February 2022, Gothenburg was also chosen as the location for the battery gigafactory.

In 2021, Volvo Cars set up a joint venture with Geely for its hybrid engine operations. The new business, Aurobay will develop and market powertrain solutions, and as of 2022, includes Volvo Cars' engine plants in Skövde and Zhangjiakou, together with its powertrain research and development operations in Gothenburg.

In June 2023, Ukraine blacklisted Geely due to its refusal to leave the Russian market. In this regard, the Swedish authorities began to discuss the possibility of a boycott of Volvo Cars. The discussion was initiated by the Ministry of Defense of Sweden.

In November 2023, Volvo Cars announced the launch of an Energy Solutions business, beginning with a vehicle-to-grid (V2G) pilot programme in Gothenburg along with local power utility Goteborg Energi.

In 2023, Volvo removed conventional engines as an option, meaning mild hybrids are the base engine option in the US.

In 2024, Volvo Cars scrapped its goal of becoming fully electric by 2030, adjusting its strategy due to industry challenges.

In November 2024, Volvo Cars announced the sale of its 30% stake in Lynk & Co to Zeekr, at a price of RMB 5.4 billion.

On March 30, 2025, Volvo Cars announced the reappointment of Samuelsson as CEO starting from 1 April, succeeding Jim Rowan who had been CEO since January 2022. Volvo said Samuelsson would be serving a two-year term while the group prepares to appoint a long-term successor. In September 2025, Volvo Cars announced that Klaus Zellmer, then CEO of Škoda Auto, would succeed Samuelsson as CEO no later than October 2027.

== Safety ==
Volvo cars have long been marketed as safe and the company has stressed its historic reputation for solidity and reliability in marketing campaigns. Volvo uses high-tech safety systems as standard equipment in new vehicles. Prior to strong government safety regulation Volvo had been at the forefront of safety engineering.

In 1944, laminated glass was introduced in the PV model. After Vattenfall engineers presented their pioneering work to Volvo in the 1950s, Volvo engineer Nils Bohlin invented and patented the modern three-point safety belt, which became standard on all Volvo cars in 1959, and then made this design patent open in the interest of safety and made it available to other car manufacturers for free. Additionally, Volvo developed the first rear-facing child seat in 1964 and introduced its own booster seat in 1978.

In 1991, the 960 introduced the first three-point seat belt for the middle of the rear seat and a child safety cushion integrated in the middle armrest. Also in 1991, it introduced the Side Impact Protection System (SIPS) on the 700, 940/960 and 850 models, which channels the force of a side impact away from the doors and into the safety cage.

In 1994, to add to its SIPS, Volvo was the first to introduce side airbags and installed them as standard equipment in all models from 1995. At the start of the 1995 model year, side impact protection airbags were standard on high trim-level Volvo 850s, and optional on other 850s. By the middle of the production year, they were standard on all 850s. In model year 1995, SIPS airbags became standard on all Volvo models.

In 1995, the Volvo 745 was recalled as the front seatbelt mounts could break in a collision.

In 1998, Volvo installed a head-protecting airbag, which was made standard in all new models as well as some existing models. The IC head-protecting airbag was not available on the 1997 C70 since the initial design deployed the airbag from the roof, and the C70, being a convertible, could not accommodate such an airbag. A later version of the C70 featured a head-protecting airbag deploying upwards from the door, avoiding this problem. It has been stated by many testing authorities that side head protecting curtain airbags can reduce the risk of death in a side impact by up to 40% and brain injury by up to 55%, as well as protect occupants during a rollover. In 1998, Volvo introduced its Whiplash Protection System (WHIPS), a safety device to prevent injury to front seat users during collisions.

In 2002, Volvo pioneered the development of a virtual crash test dummy representing a midsized pregnant female. It was named Linda and was modeled in her 36th week of pregnancy to analyze the effects of high-speed impact on the womb, placenta, and fetus. Collaborating with Chalmers University of Technology, they also crafted a computer model of an average-sized female to advance its Whiplash Protection System (WHIPS).

In 2004, Volvo introduced the Blind Spot Information System (BLIS), which detects vehicles entering the vehicle's blind spot with a side-view-mirror-mounted camera, and alerts the driver with a light. That year also saw Volvos sold in all markets equipped with side-marker lights and daytime running lights. Also, since 2004 all Volvo models except for the coupes (C70 and C30) are available with an all-wheel drive system developed by Haldex Traction of Sweden.

In 2005, Volvo presented the second generation of Volvo C70, which came with extra stiff door-mounted inflatable side curtains (the first of its kind in a convertible) dubbed 'DMIC'.

Volvo's safety systems remained standard on all Volvo vehicles while under ownership of Ford Motor Company. Volvo had patented many of its safety innovations, including SIPS, WHIPS, ROPS, DSTC, and body structures. Some of these systems were fitted to other Ford and Premier Automotive Group vehicles in forms similar to those of Volvo systems.

A 2005 Folksam report put the 740/940 (from 1982 on) in the 15% better than average category for safety based on real-life accidents, coming second to the most-recommended 30% better than average category.

In 2005, when the American non-profit, non-governmental Insurance Institute for Highway Safety (IIHS) released its first annual "Top Safety Picks" vehicles list, none of Volvo's offered vehicles in the US were included on the list. According to Russ Rader, a spokesman for IIHS, Volvo lagged behind its competitors. Dan Johnston, a Volvo spokesman, denied that the company's vehicles were any less safe than the institute's top-rated vehicles, adding that

It's just a philosophy on safety that is different from building cars to pass these kinds of tests.

In 2006, Volvo's Personal Car Communicator (PCC) remote control was launched as an optional feature with the all-new Volvo S80. Before a driver enters their car, they can review the security level and know whether they had set the alarm and if the car is locked. Additionally, a heartbeat sensor warns if someone is hiding inside the car. The S80 was also the first Volvo model to feature adaptive cruise control (ACC) with Collision Warning and Brake Support (CWBS).

In 2008, a French court found Volvo partially responsible for causing the death of two children and serious injuries of another in Wasselonne on 17 June 1999, when the brakes of a 1996 Volvo 850 failed. The court subjected Volvo to a €200,000 fine.

According to the Insurance Institute for Highway Safety (IIHS), Volvo's S80 became one of the 2009 Top Safety Picks Award winners. The previous versions of the S40 and S60 models (2005–09 models with standard side airbags) failed to attain the highest rating in its side impact test. However, according to the IIHS, in recent years Volvo cars have still managed to maintain its high class safety ratings as seen in test results. The Volvo XC90, S80, C70, XC60, S60 and C30 are all rated Top Safety Picks in these crash tests. The 2014 models of the XC60, XC90, S60 and S80 have even received the Top Safety Pick+ rating. All Volvos tested in the small overlap test have received a 'good' rating.

Volvo has also scored high in Euro NCAP tests. Since 2009, all the Volvo models that Euro NCAP have tested have received five-star safety ratings: Volvo C30, V40, V60, V60 plug-in hybrid, XC60 and V70. The second generation Volvo V40 got the best test result of any car model ever tested by Euro NCAP at the time. As well the redesigned XC60 received the highest adult occupant score (98%) in 2017.

In the United States, Volvo paid $19.6 million in fines for missing its Corporate Average Fuel Economy targets for the 2010–2014 model years. In July 2017, Volvo announced that new models launched from 2019 onward would be fully electric or hybrid-electric, heralding the end of production of nearly a century of Volvo vehicles powered solely by the internal combustion engine. Volvo, however, will continue to produce non-electric, non-hybrid cars from models introduced before that year but will discontinue them once the non-hybrid, non-electric cars receive a facelift or complete redesign. In 2019, Volvo announced that it plans to produce only electrified cars from the year 2040 onwards.

In 2019, Volvo introduced the E.V.A. (Equal Vehicles for All) Initiative, which aims to share the results of research and safety development since 1970. This initiative's goal is to contribute to safer cars for everyone - regardless of gender and size. Due to the traditional use of male crash test dummies in safety tests, women face a higher risk of injury in car accidents. Volvo's Accident Research Team, however, has been collecting real-world collision data since the 1970s, ensuring representation for both men and women.

=== Safety milestones ===
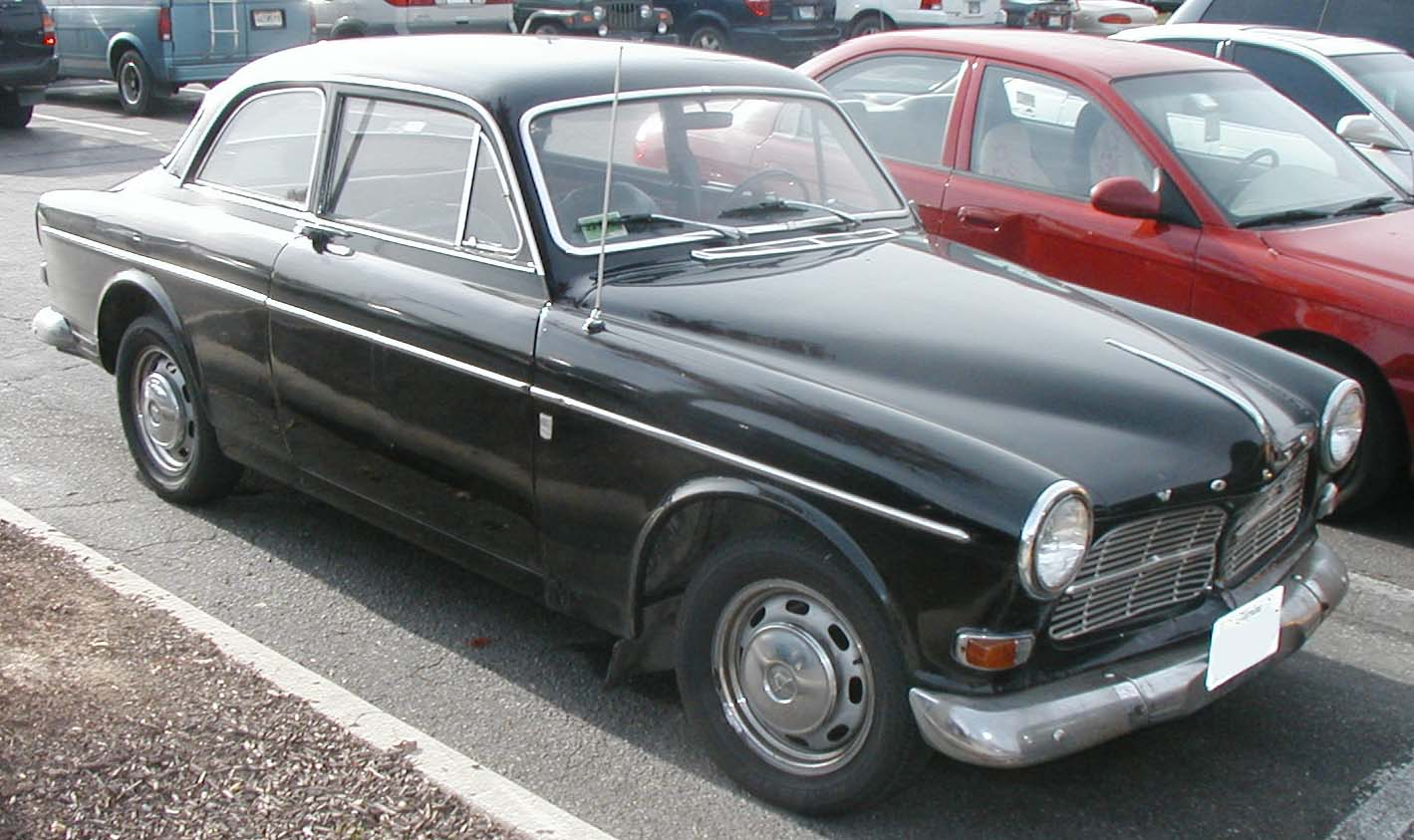
The Amazon was noted for its safety features: a padded dashboard, front and rear seat belts, and a laminated windshield.

This list provides dates of when Volvo incorporated these technologies into its cars, and does not necessarily represent Volvo innovations.

- 1944 – safety cage
- 1944 – laminated windscreen
- 1957 – anchor points for two-point safety belts, front
- 1958 – anchor points for two-point safety belts, rear
- 1959 – three-point safety belt, standard in front seats
- 1964 – rearward-facing child safety seat, first prototype tested
- 1966 – crumple zones front and rear
- 1966 – safety door-locks
- 1969 – inertia-reel safety belts
- 1971 – reminder safety belt
- 1972 – three-point safety belt, outer rear seats
- 1972 – rearward-facing child safety seat
- 1974 – multistage impact absorbing steering column
- 1974 – bulb integrity sensor
- 1975 – braking system with stepped bore master cylinder
- 1978 – child safety booster cushion
- 1982 – "anti-submarining" protection
- 1986 – three-point safety belt in centre rear seat (740/760)
- 1990 – integrated child safety cushion in centre rear seat (940/960)
- 1991 – Side Impact Protection System (850 and 940/960)
- 1991 – automatic height adjusting safety belt
- 1992 – reinforced rear seats, estate models
- 1995 – front side airbags (seat-mounted) for torso (850), integrated child safety cushion, outer rear seats
- 1997 – Roll Over Protection System (C70)
- 1998 – Whiplash Protection System (S80)
- 1998 – roof-mounted inflatable curtain side airbags (S80)
- 2001 – SCC : Volvo Safety Concept Car
- 2002 – Roll Stability Control (XC90)
- 2003 – Volvo Intelligent Vehicle Architecture, new front structure (S40, V50)
- 2003 – rear seat belt reminders (S40, V50)
- 2003 – Intelligent Driver Information System, a system that selectively blocks information to the driver in complex traffic situations and lets the information through once the situation has calmed down (S40, V50)
- 2003 – Volvo's Traffic Accident Research Team, inaugurated in Bangkok
- 2004 – Blind Spot Information System, informs the driver of vehicles in the blind spots, using a yellow LED in the A-pillars (S40, V50)
- 2005 – door-mounted inflatable curtain airbags (C70)
- 2006 – Personal Car Communicator (S80)
- 2006 – Collision Warning Brake Support, a system that warns the driver and gives brake support when a collision with another vehicle in front of the car is imminent (S80)
- 2006 – Electrical Parking Brake (S80)
- 2007 – Driver Alert Control, a driver drowsiness detection system that alerts the driver when the system detects that they are becoming tired (S80, V70, XC70)
- 2007 – Lane Departure Warning, a system that warns the driver for unintended lane departures (S80, V70, XC70)
- 2007 – Collision Warning with Auto Brake, a system that automatically brakes the car when a collision with another vehicle in front of the car is imminent (S80, V70, XC70)
- 2007 – Distance Alert, a system that helps the driver keeping a safe distance to the vehicle ahead, by continuously measuring the distance and lighting up the vehicle's head up display if the time gap becomes shorter than what the driver has specified (S80, V70, XC70)
- 2007 – Alcoguard, a hand-held device that the driver blows into before they can start the car, mainly aimed for the company-car sector, taxi operators, state authorities and municipalities (S80, V70, XC70)
- 2008 – City Safety, a system that automatically brakes the car at speeds below 30 km/h (19 mph) if an obstruction is detected in front of the car (new XC60)
- 2010 – Pedestrian Detection with Auto Brake, a system that warns the driver and automatically brakes the car when a collision with a pedestrian in front of the car is imminent (S60)
- 2012 – pedestrian airbag, covering the A-pillars and the lower part of the windscreen in case of collision with a pedestrian (Volvo V40)
- 2012 – knee airbag, for the driver (V40)
- 2012 – Upgraded City Safety, now working up to 50 km/h (31 mph) (S80, V70, XC70, XC60, S60, V60, new V40)
- 2012 – Lane Keeping Aid, a system that steers the car back into the lane again if it is about to unintentionally drift out of the lane (V40)
- 2012 – Road Sign Information, a system that reads road signs and displays them in the information display, thereby helping the driver to remember speed limits, no-overtaking stretches, low-speed areas, etc. (S80, V70, XC70, XC60, S60, V60, V40)
- 2012 – Enhanced Blind Spot Information System, now able to detect approaching vehicles up to 70 meters behind the car (V40)
- 2012 – Cross Traffic Alert, alerting the driver of crossing traffic approaching from the sides (up to 30 meters away) when reversing out of a parking space (V40)
- 2013 – Cyclist Detection with Auto Brake, a system that warns the driver and automatically brakes the car when a collision with a cyclist travelling in the same direction as the car in front of the car is imminent (S80, V70, XC70, XC60, XC90, S60, V60, V40)
- 2018 – Head-on crash detection with Auto Brake.

== Car models ==
=== Early years ===
- Volvo ÖV 4, a.k.a. Jakob
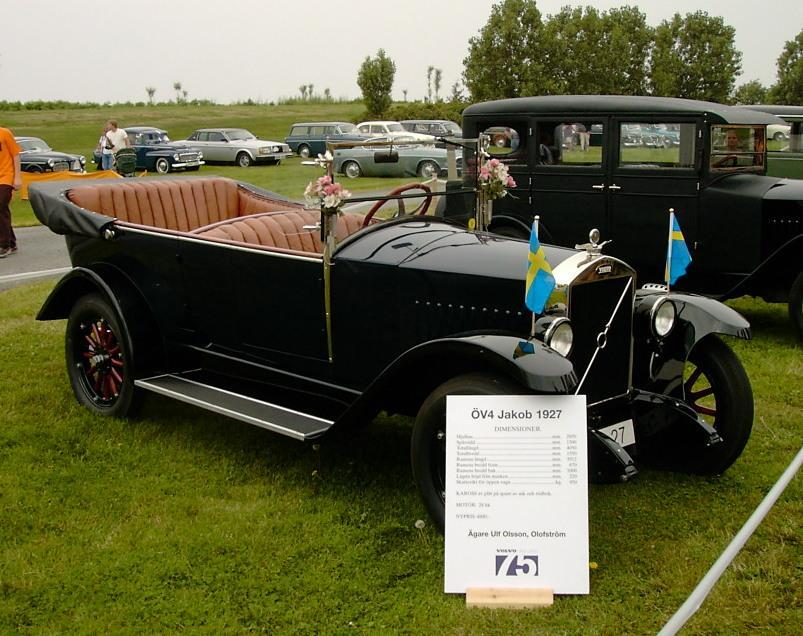
  1927 Volvo ÖV 4
- Volvo PV650 Series
- Volvo TR670 Series
- Volvo PV 36 Carioca
- Volvo PV51
- Volvo PV800 Series (civilian (PV801, PV802, PV810, PV821, PV822 and PV831) and military (TP21/P2104, P2104))
- Volvo PV 60
- Volvo PV444/544
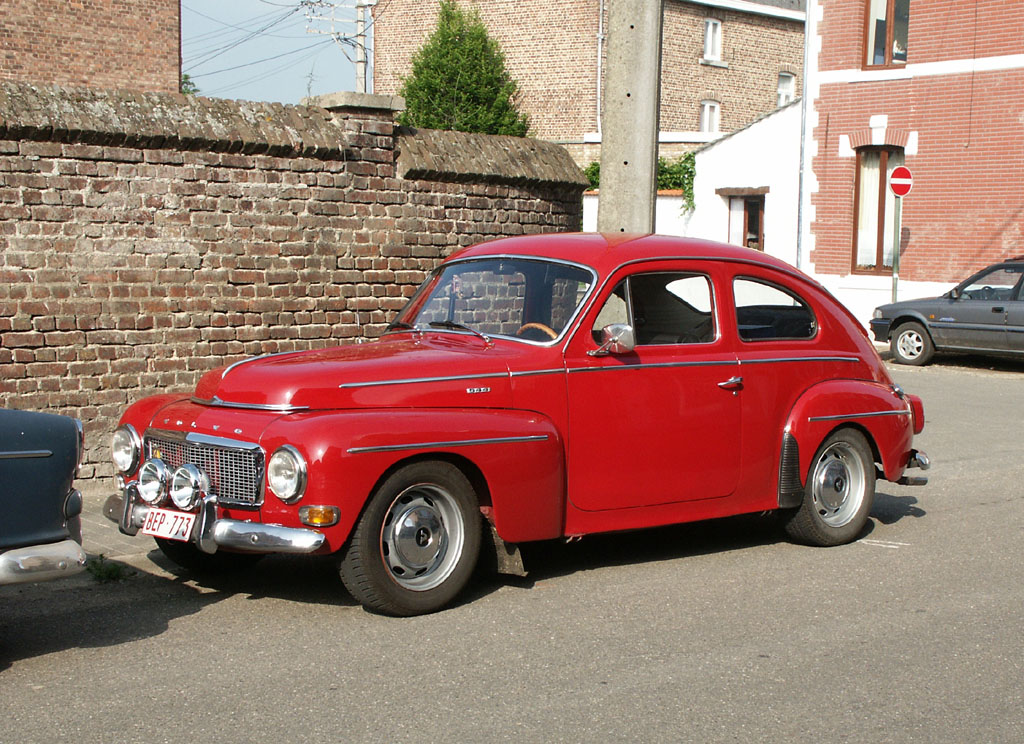
  Volvo PV544
- Volvo Duett (Volvo PV445, P210)
- Volvo P1900
- Volvo Amazon/Volvo 122
- Volvo P1800
- Volvo 66
- Volvo C202
- Volvo C3-series (C303, C304 and C306)

=== Tri-digit nomenclature ===
Starting with the 140 series in 1966, Volvo used a tri-digit system for its cars. The first number was the series, the second number the number of cylinders and the third number the number of doors; so a 164 was a 1-series with a six-cylinder engine and four doors. However, there were exceptions to this rule – the 780 for example, came with turbocharged I4 and naturally aspirated V6 petrol engines and I6 diesel engines, but never an eight-cylinder, as the "eight" would suggest. Similarly, the 760 often was equipped with a turbocharged I4 engine, and the Volvo 360 only had four cylinders. Some 240GLT had a V6 engine. The company dropped the meaning of the final digit for later cars like the 740, but the digit continued to identify cars underhood on the identification plate.

- Volvo 140 (Volvo 142, Volvo 144, Volvo 145)
- Volvo 164
- Volvo 240 (Volvo 242, 244, 245)
- Volvo 260 (Volvo 262C, 264, 265)
- Volvo 340 (Volvo 343, 345)
- Volvo 360
- Volvo 440/460
- Volvo 480
- Volvo 740
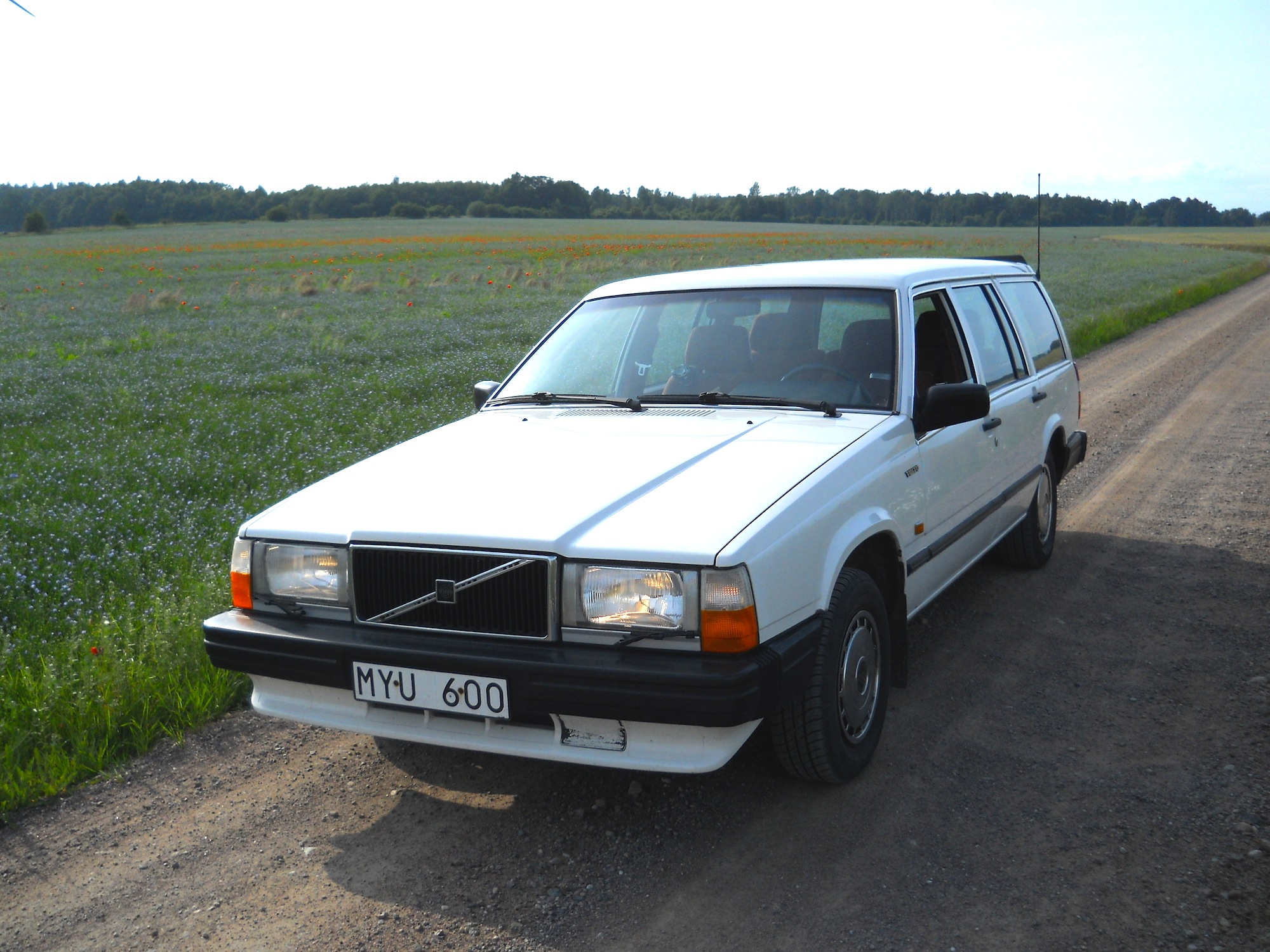
  The Volvo 740 was one of the few European passenger cars that could carry a EUR-pallet in its luggage compartment.
- Volvo 760
- Volvo 780
- Volvo 850
- Volvo 940
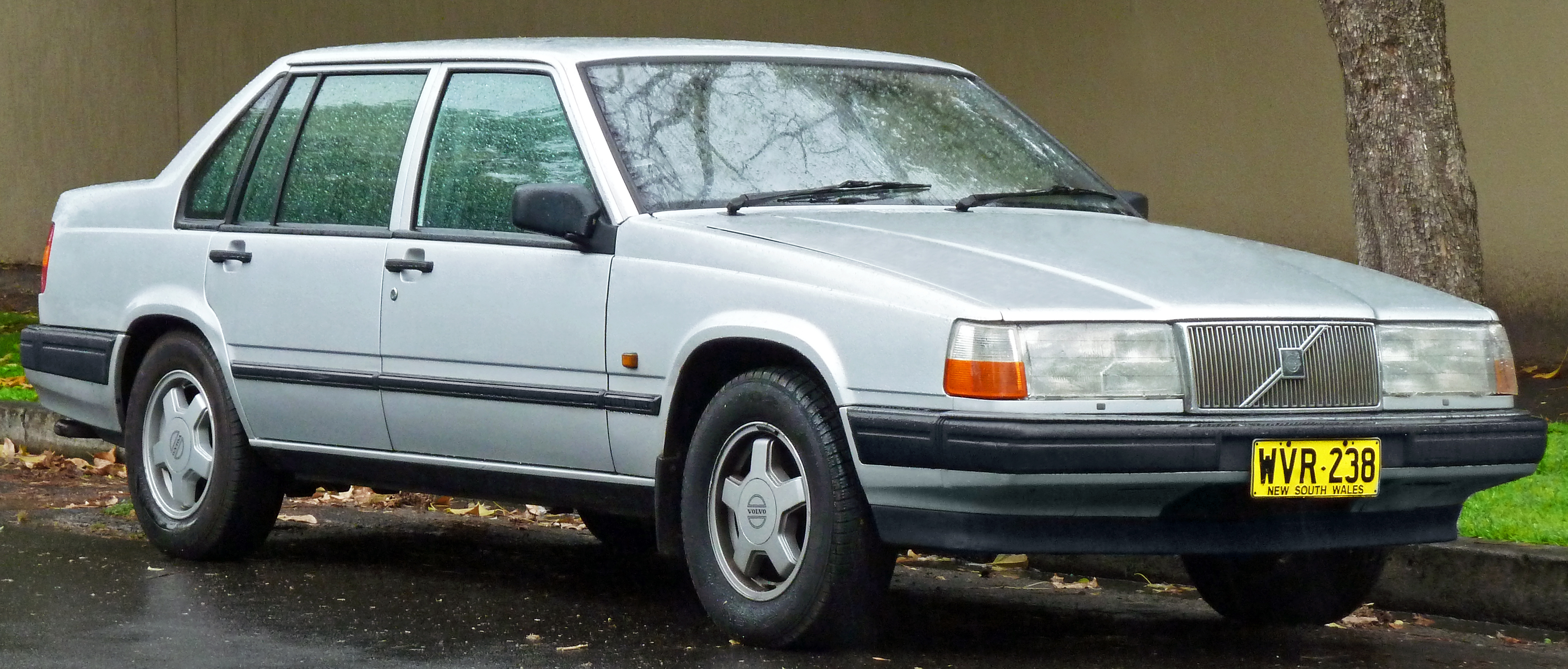
  The Volvo 940 series was an evolution of the 740 series, fitted with SIPS (Side Impact Protection System) and other safety features.
- Volvo 960

=== Post tri-digit models ===
- Released in 1995
  - Volvo S40
  - Volvo V40
- Released in 1996
  - Volvo S70 replaced the 850 saloon
  - Volvo V70 replaced the 850 estate
  - Volvo S90 replaced the 960 saloon
  - Volvo V90 replaced the 960 estate
- Released in 1997
  - Volvo C70 coupé
  - Volvo V70 XC
- Released in 1998
  - Volvo C70 convertible
  - Volvo S80 replaced the Volvo S90
- Released in 2000
  - Volvo S60 replaced the Volvo S70
  - Volvo V70 II
  - Volvo V70 XC II/XC70
- Released in 2002
  - Volvo XC90
- Released in 2004
  - Volvo S40 II replaced the Volvo S40
  - Volvo V50 replaced the Volvo V40
- Released in 2006
  - Volvo C30
  - Volvo C70 II
  - Volvo S80 II
- Released in 2007
  - Volvo V70 III
  - Volvo XC70 II
- Released in 2008
  - Volvo XC60
- Released in 2010
  - Volvo S60 II replaced the Volvo S60
  - Volvo V60 replaced the Volvo V50
- Released in 2012
  - Volvo V40 II replaced both the Volvo S40 II and Volvo V50
- Released in 2014
  - Volvo XC Classic
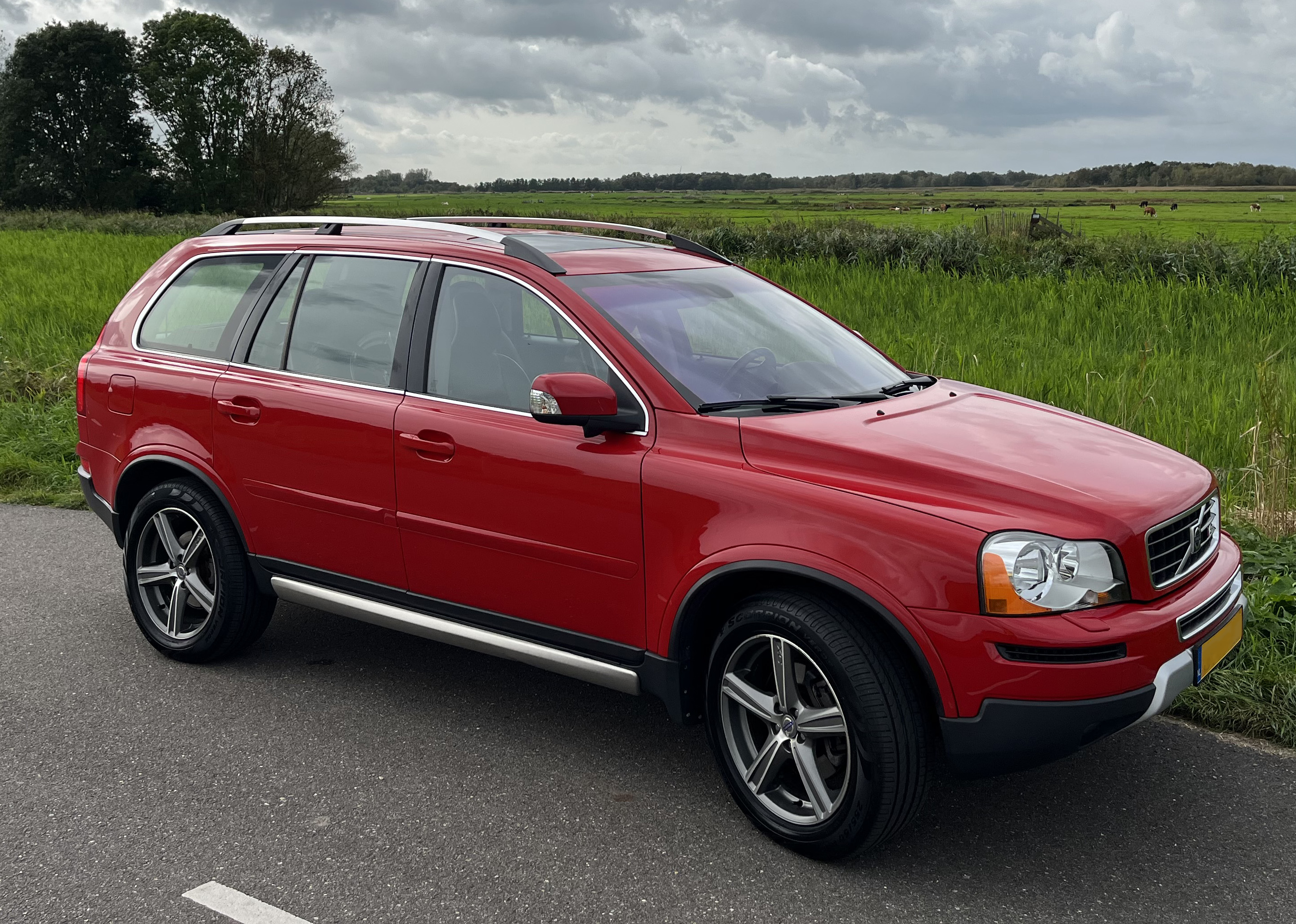
    The XC90, introduced in 2002, was the first Volvo SUV
  - Volvo XC90 II replaced the Volvo XC90
- Released in 2016
  - Volvo S90 replaced the Volvo S80 II
  - Volvo V90 replaced both the Volvo V70 III and Volvo XC70 II
- Released in 2017
  - Volvo XC60 II replaced the Volvo XC60
  - Volvo XC40
- Released in 2018
  - Volvo V60 II replaced the Volvo V60
- Released in 2021
  - Volvo C40 coupé version of the Volvo XC40 Recharge
- Released in 2022
  - Volvo EX90 fully electric replacement for the Volvo XC90 II
- Released in 2023
  - Volvo EX30
  - Volvo EM90
- Released in 2025
  - Volvo ES90 fully electric replacement for the Volvo S90 II
  - Volvo XC70 (2025)
- Released in 2026
  - Volvo EX60

=== Current models ===
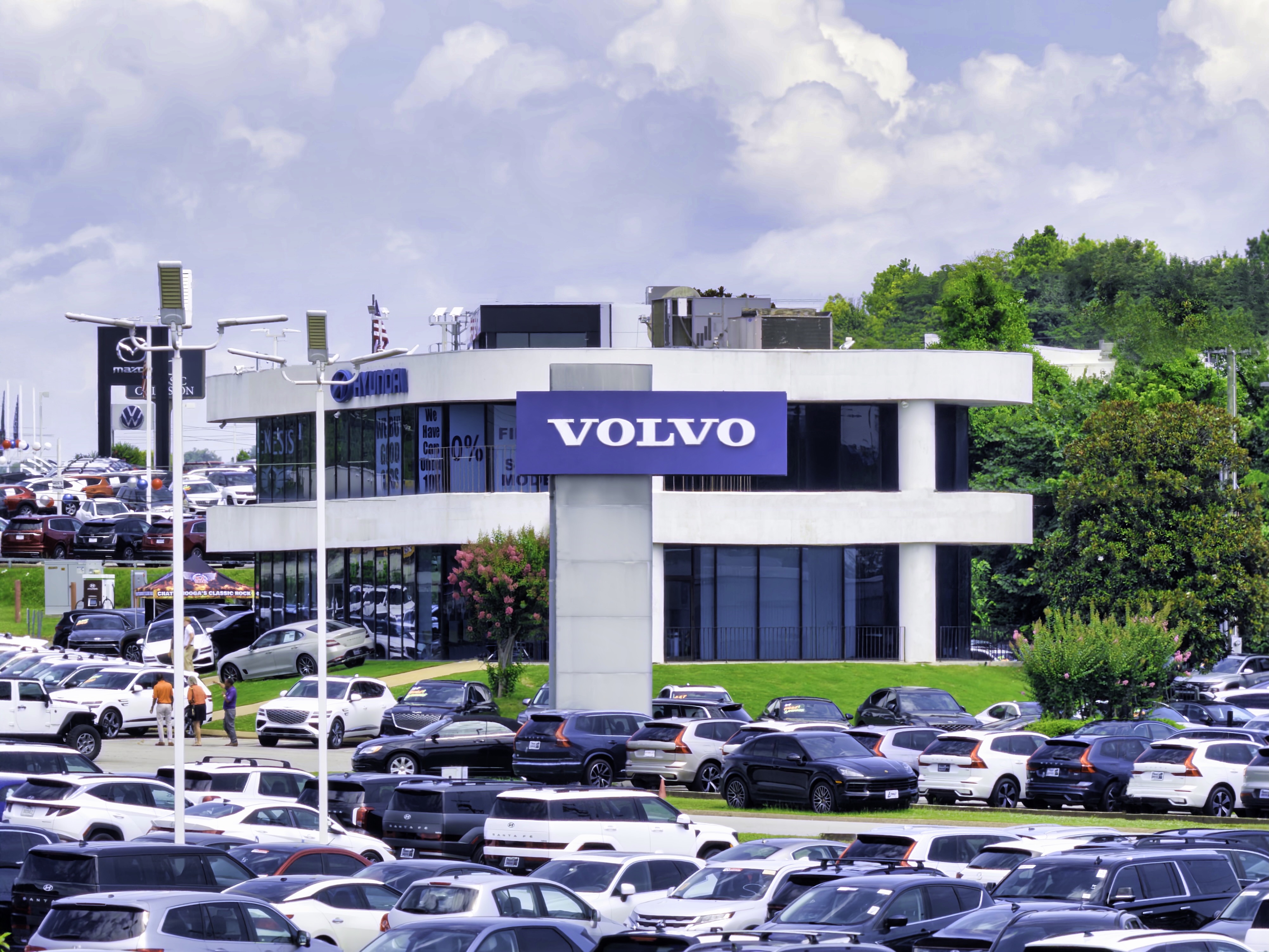
A Volvo car dealership in Chattanooga, Tennessee

Today, the company uses a system of letters denoting body style followed by the series number. "S" stands for "sedan", "C" stands for "coupé" or "convertible" (including three-door hatchback AKA "shooting brake") and "V" stands for "versatile" (5-door hatchback and station wagon). A V50 is an estate (also under "V") that is smaller than the V70. "XC" stands for "cross country", which was originally added to a more rugged version of the V70 model (the V70XC), and indicates all wheel drive paired with a raised suspension to give the model an SUV look. Volvo would later change the name to the XC70, keeping its car naming consistent with the XC90.

Originally, Volvo had planned to use a different naming scheme. S and C were to be the same as they are now, but "F", standing for "flexibility", was to be used on station wagons. When Volvo introduced the first generation S40 and V40 in 1995, they were announced as the S4 and F4. However, Audi complained that it had inherent rights to the S4 name, since it names its sporty vehicles "S", and the yet to be introduced sport version of the Audi A4 would have the S4 name. Volvo agreed to add a second digit, so the vehicles became the S40 and F40. However, that led to another complaint from Ferrari, who had the Ferrari F40 sports car. This led to Volvo switching the "F" to "V", for versatile.

- Medium cars (SEA platform)
  - Volvo EX30 2023–present (M/Y 2024–present)
- Medium cars (CMA platform)
  - Volvo XC40 2017–present (M/Y 2019–present)
  - Volvo EC40 2021–present (M/Y 2022–present)
- Large cars (SPA platform)
  - Volvo XC90 II 2014–present (M/Y 2015–present)
  - Volvo S90 II 2016–present (M/Y 2017–present)
  - Volvo XC60 II 2017–present (M/Y 2018–present)
  - Volvo V60 II 2018–present (M/Y 2019–present)
- Large plug-in hybrid cars (SMA platform)
  - Volvo XC70 2025–present (M/Y 2025–present)
- Large electric cars (SPA2 platform)
  - Volvo EX90 2022–present (M/Y 2024–present)
  - Volvo ES90 2025–present (M/Y 2025-present)
- Large electric cars (SPA3 platform)
  - Volvo EX60 2026–present (M/Y 2026–present)
- Large electric MPV (SEA platform)
  - Volvo EM90 2024–present (M/Y 2024–present)
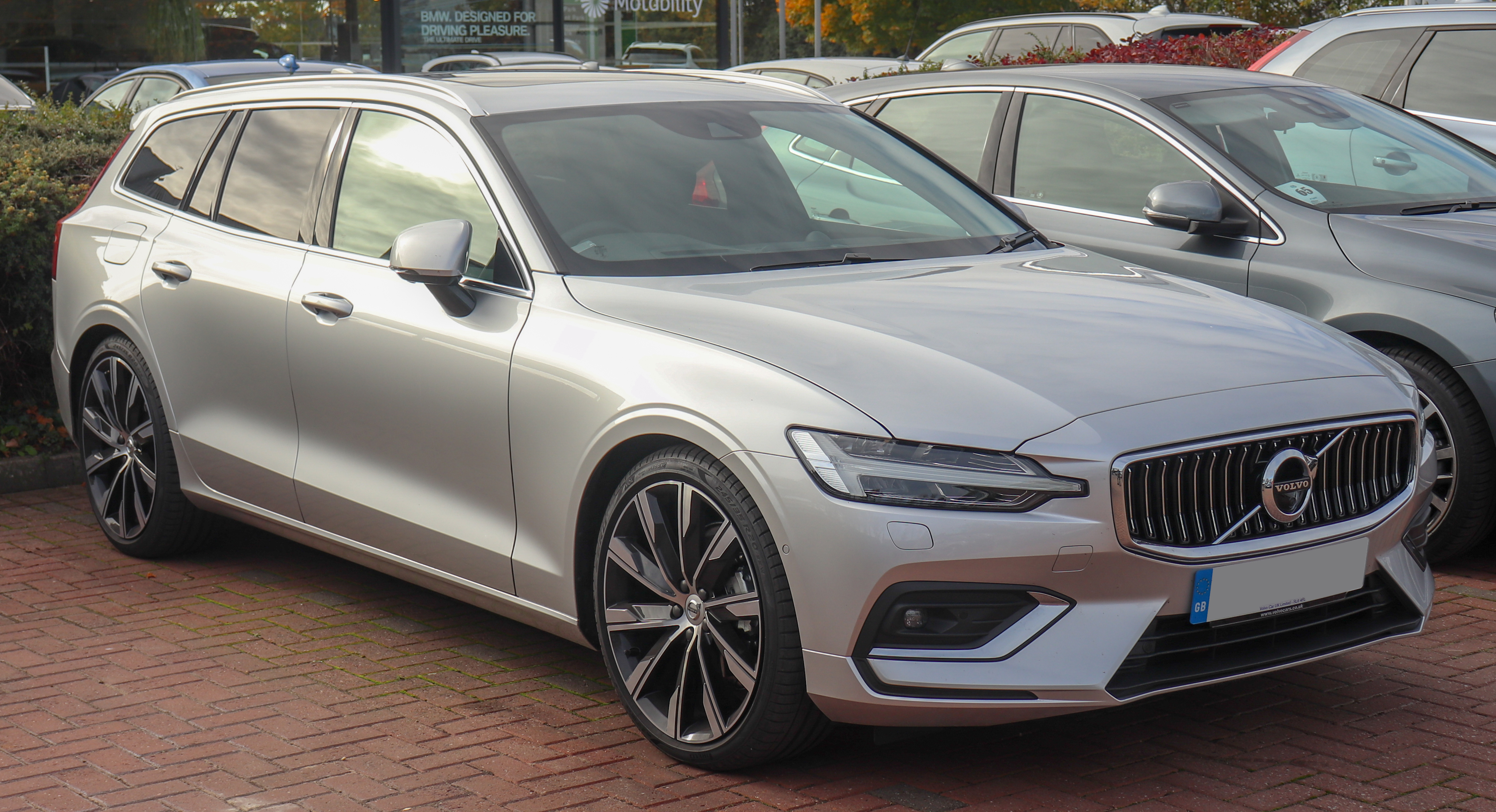
Volvo V60

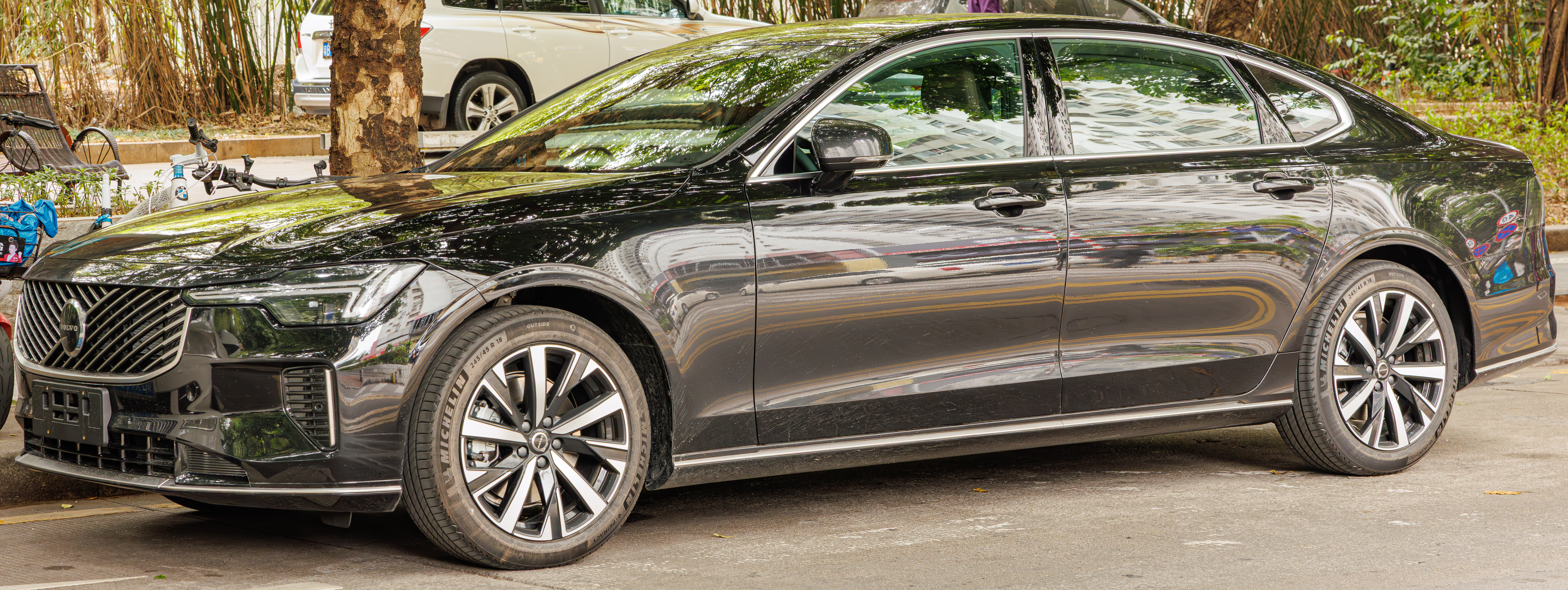
Volvo S90

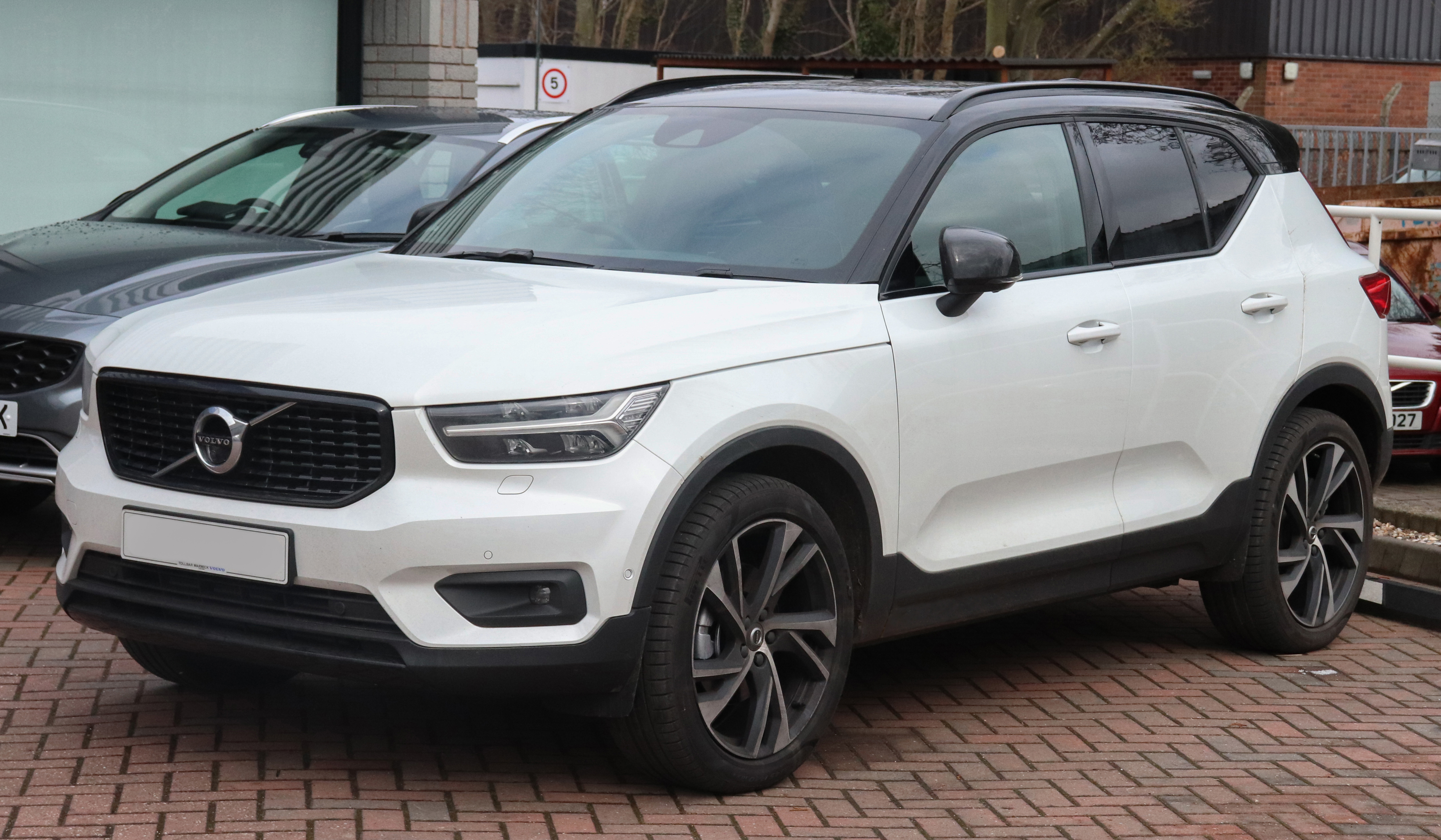
Volvo XC40

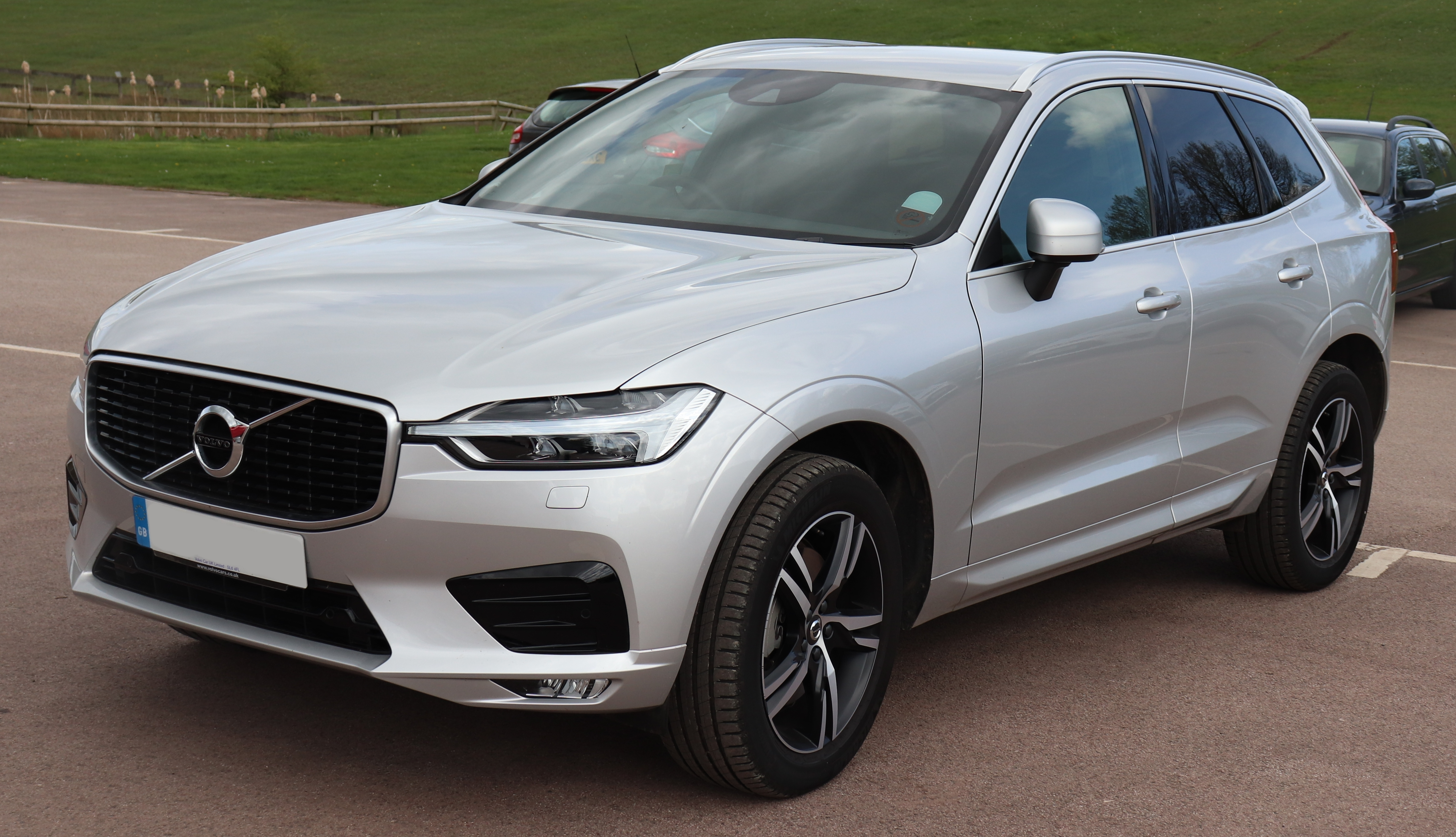
Volvo XC60

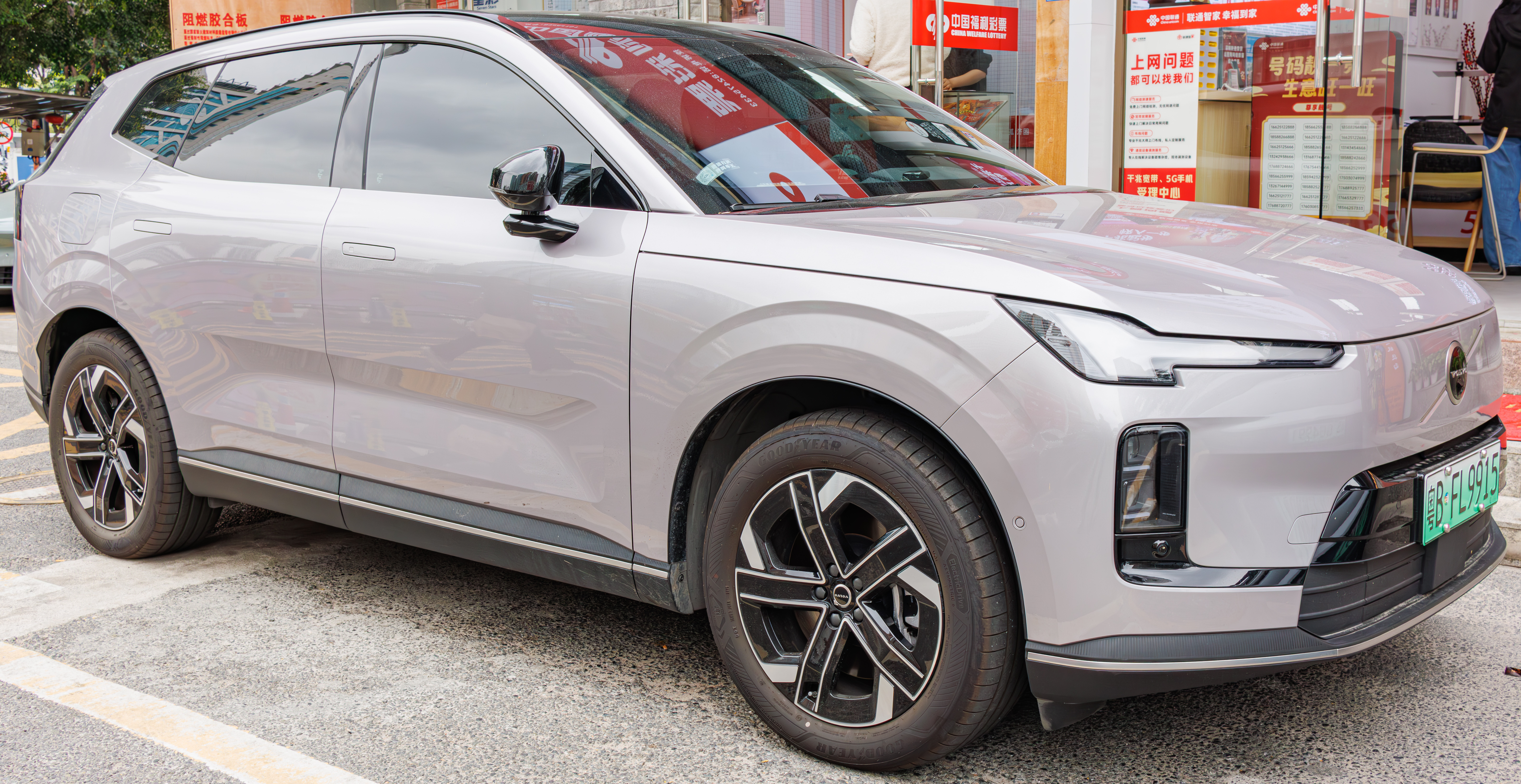
Volvo XC70

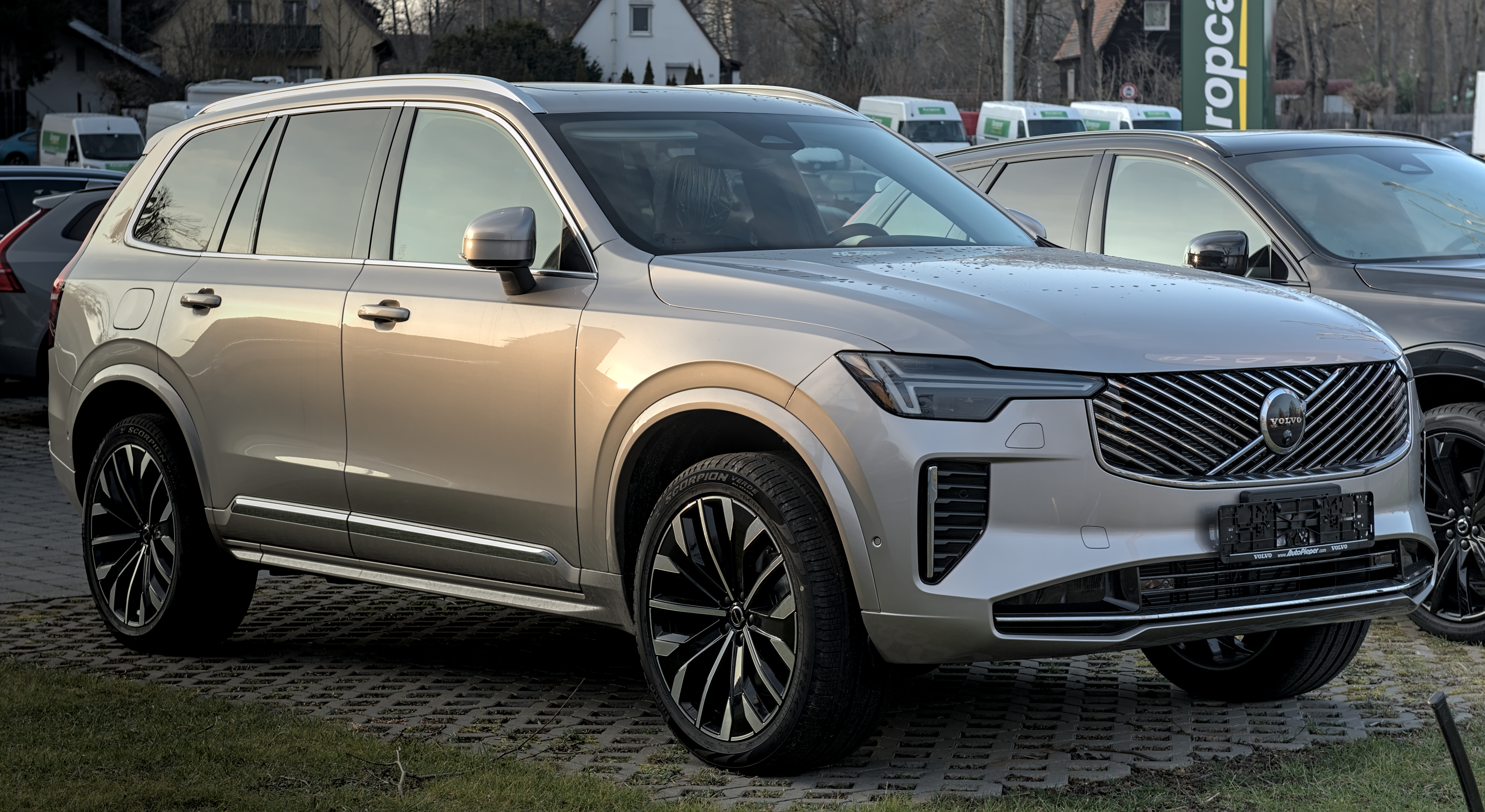
Volvo XC90

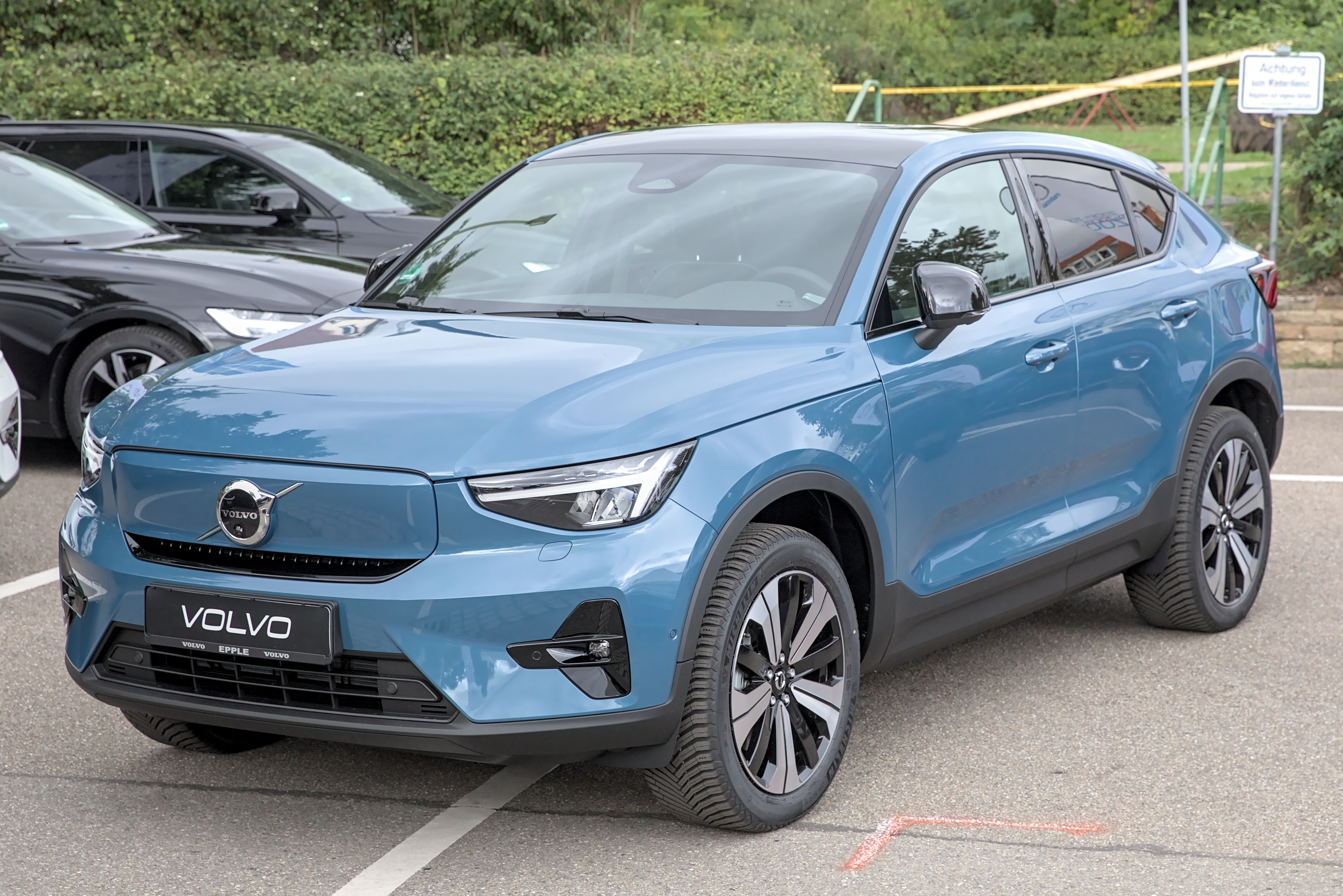
Volvo EC40

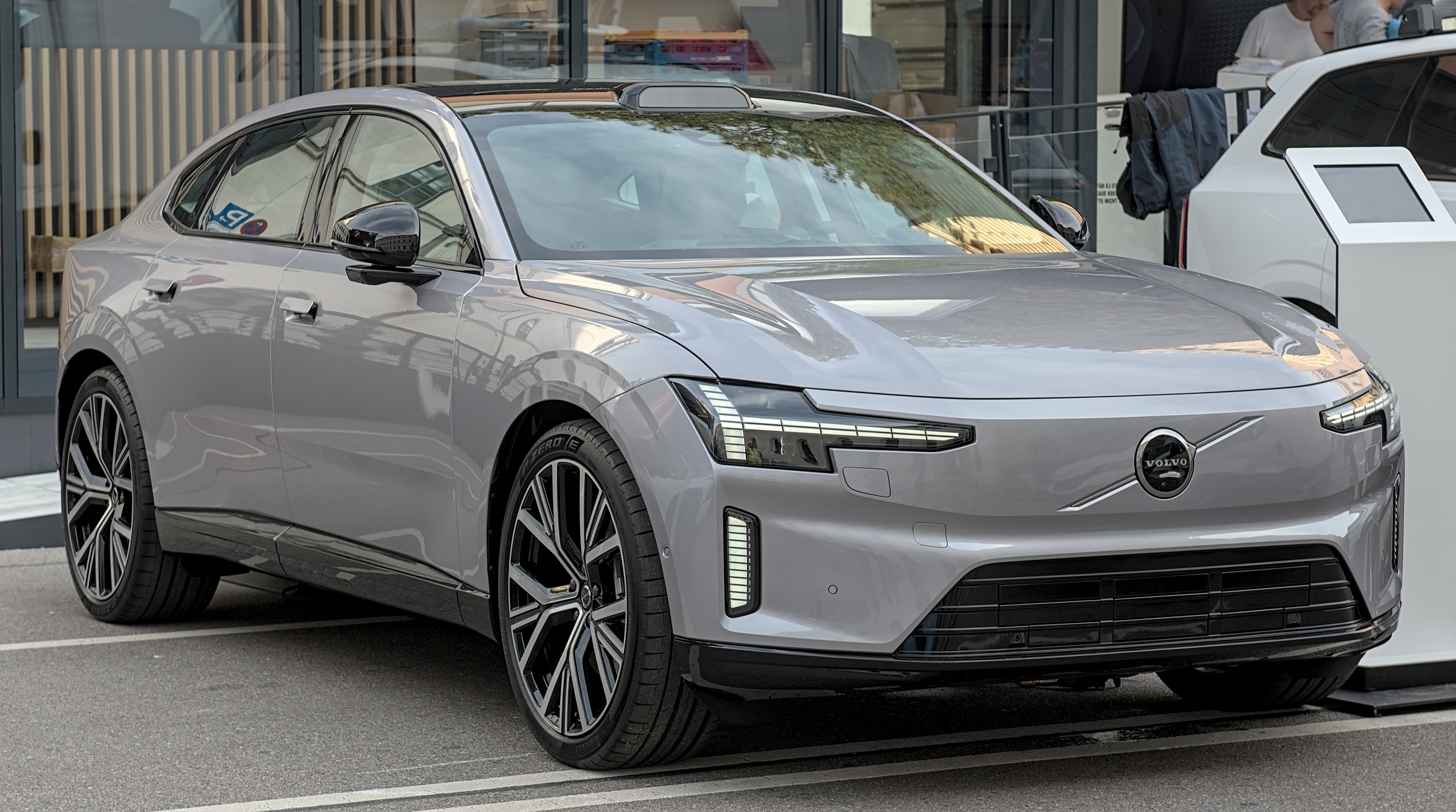
Volvo ES90

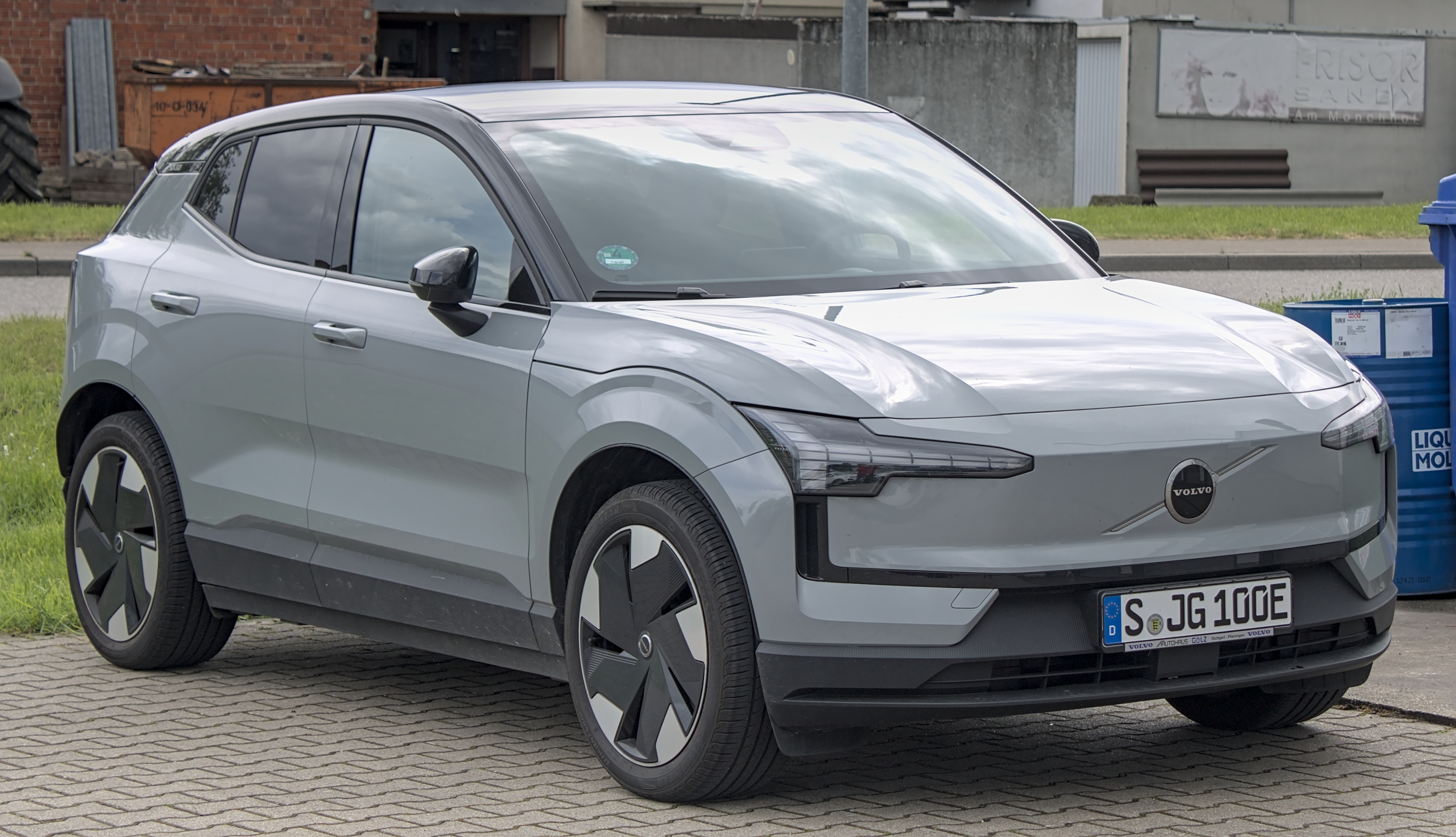
Volvo EX30

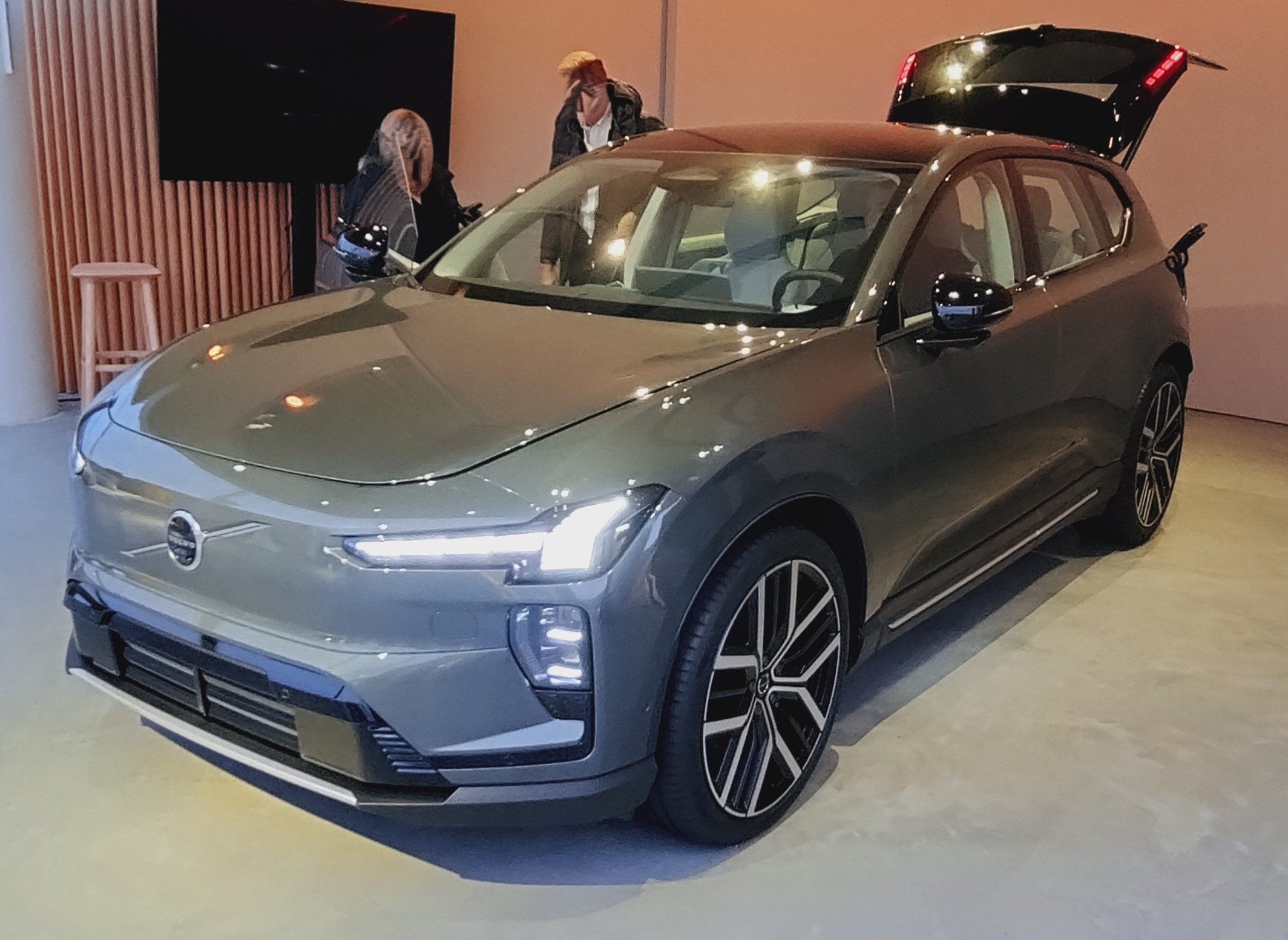
Volvo EX60

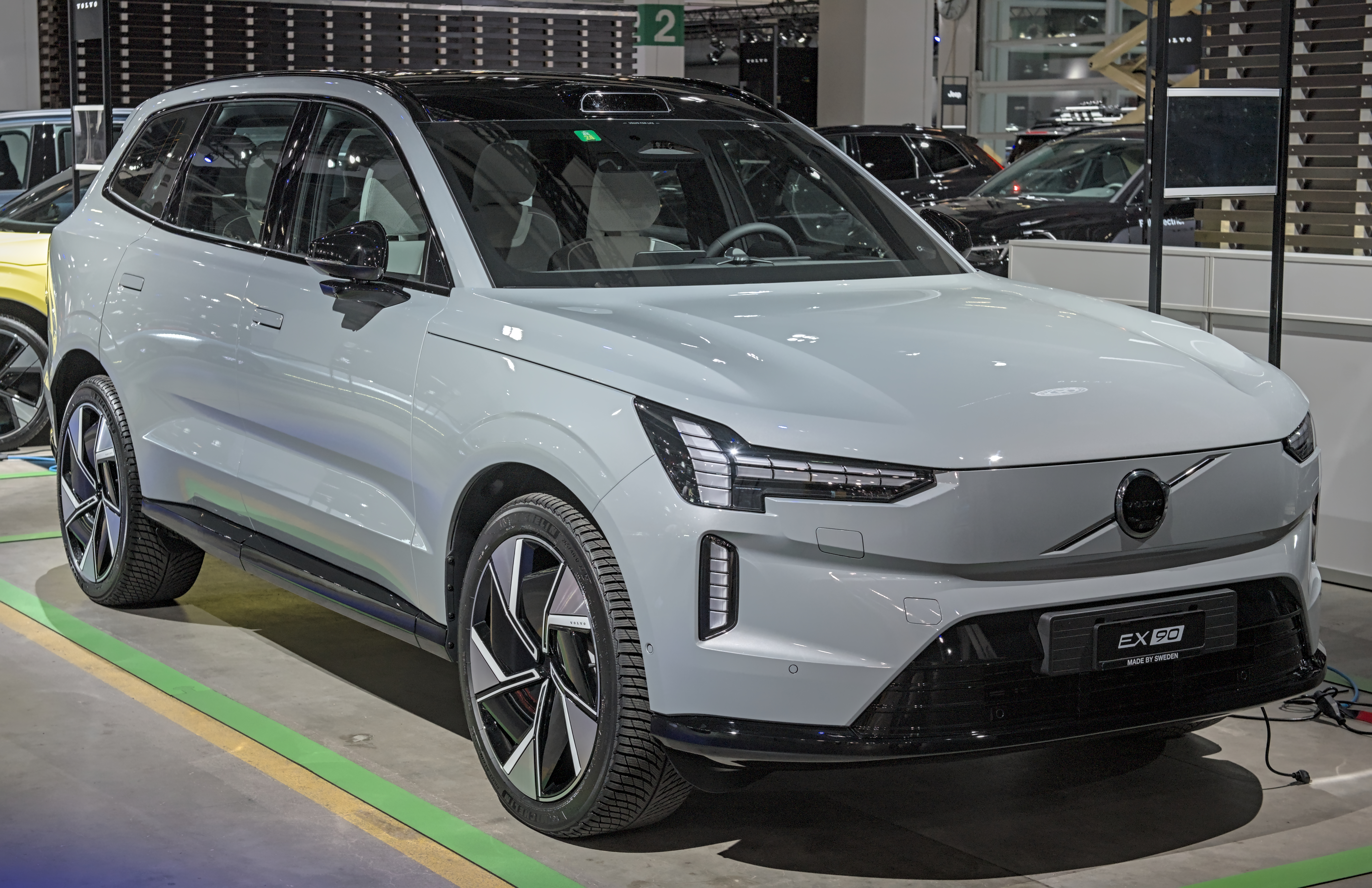
Volvo EX90

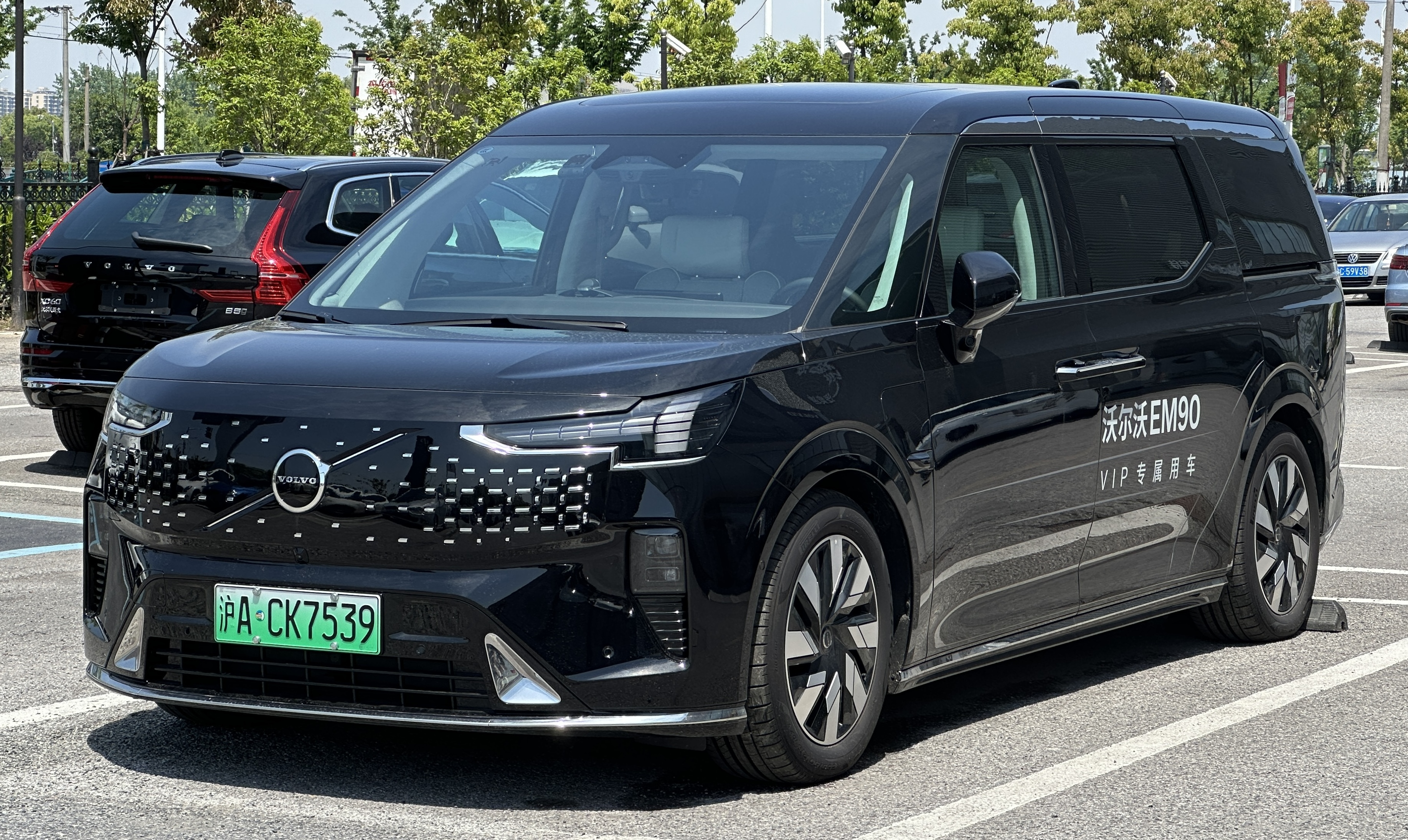
Volvo EM90

=== Concept cars ===
- Volvo Venus Bilo (1933)
- Volvo Philip (1952)
- Volvo Margarete Rose (1953)
- Volvo Elisabeth I (1953)
- Volvo GTZ (1969)
- Volvo GTZ 3000 (1970)
- Volvo VESC (1972)
- Volvo 1800 ESC (1972)
- Volvo EC (1977)
- Volvo City Taxi (1977)
- Volvo Tundra (1979)
- Volvo VCC – Volvo Concept Car (1980)
- Volvo LCP2000 (1983)
- Volvo ECC – Environment Concept Car (1992)
- Volvo ACC – Adventure Concept Car (1997)
- Volvo SCC – Safety Concept Car (2001)
- Volvo PCC – Performance Concept Car (2001)
- Volvo PCC2 (2002)
- Volvo ACC2 (2002)
- Volvo VCC – Versatility Concept Car (2003)
- Volvo YCC – Your Concept Car (2004)
- Volvo T6 (2005)
- Volvo 3CC (2005)
- Volvo C30 Design Concept (2006)
- Volvo XC60 Concept (2006)
- Volvo ReCharge Concept (2007)
- Volvo S60 Concept (2008)
- C30 DRIVe Electric (2010)
- Volvo Universe Concept (2011)
- Volvo Concept You (2011)
- Volvo Concept Coupe (2013)
- Volvo Concept Estate (2014)
- Volvo Concept XC Coupe (2014)
- Volvo 40.1 (2016)
- Volvo 40.2 (2016)
- Volvo 360c (2018)
- Volvo Concept Recharge (2021)

== Alternative propulsion ==
In 2019, Volvo announced that it plans to produce only fully electrified cars from the year 2040 onwards. From 2040, it plans to no longer produce internal combustion engine powered vehicles. In March 2021, Volvo doubled down on these plans and committed to being an electric-only car maker by 2030.

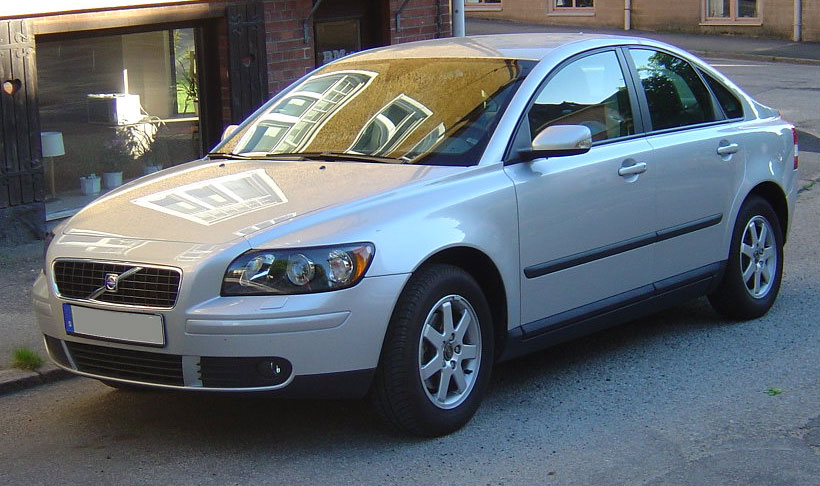
The 2005 Volvo FlexiFuel S40 was one of the first E85 flex cars launched in the Swedish market by a domestic automaker. The Volvo FlexiFuel is now offered on the European market.

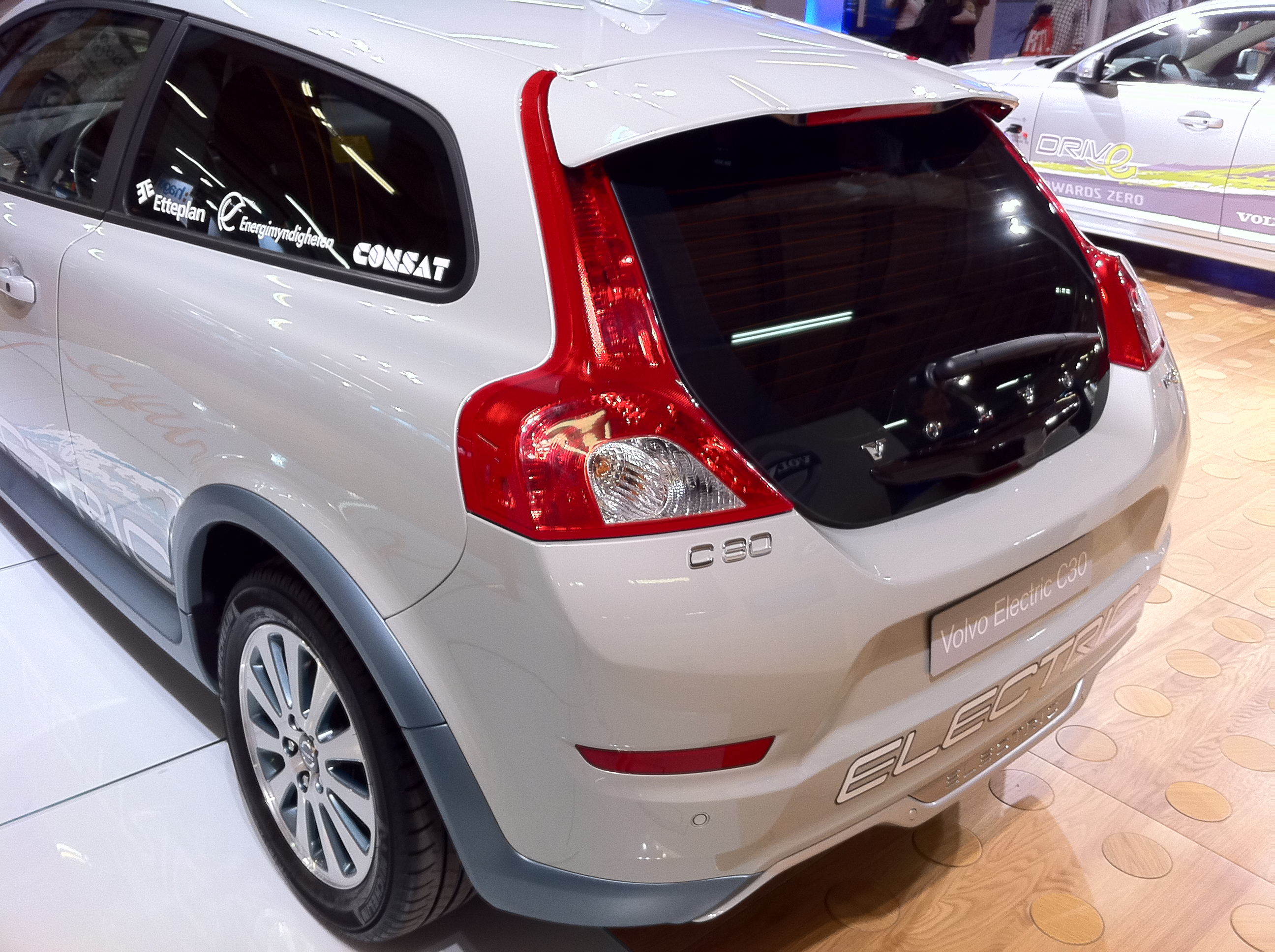
The Volvo C30 DRIVe Electric concept car was exhibited at the 2010 Paris Motor Show.

=== Flexible-fuel vehicles ===
In 2005, Volvo introduced to the Swedish market the company's first E85 flexifuel models. Volvo introduced its S40 and V50 with flexible-fuel engines, joined in late 2006 by the then new C30. All Volvo models were initially restricted to the Swedish market, until 2007, when these three models were launched in eight new European markets. In 2008, Volvo launched the V70 with a 2.5-litre turbocharged flexifuel engine.

=== Plug-in hybrids ===
The Volvo ReCharge is a plug-in hybrid concept car with an all-electric range (AER) of 60 miles (97 km). It was officially unveiled at the 2007 Frankfurt Auto Show.

On 1 June 2009, Volvo announced the launching of series production diesel-electric plug-in hybrids by 2012. The company plans to sell a series hybrid with the goal of achieving emissions of less than 50 grams of CO_{2} per kilometer. As part of a joint venture with Vattenfall, a Swedish energy company, Volvo converted two Volvo V70s to plug-in hybrid demonstration vehicles that have been in field testing in Göteborg, Sweden since December 2009. Vattenfall offered customers participating in this trial a supply of renewable electricity generated from wind power or hydropower. Among other challenges, the demonstration tests the car's all-electric range at low temperatures, which has been a disadvantage of plug-in vehicles.

=== Electric car ===
The Volvo C30 DRIVe Electric concept car was exhibited at the 2010 Paris Motor Show and Volvo announced that field testing will begin in 2011, in the US, Europe, and China. The C30 DRIVe electric car has a lithium-ion battery, a top speed of 130 km/h (81 mph), and an all-electric range of up to 150 kilometres (93 mi). Field testing began in 2010 with 10 units in Göteborg, Sweden.

=== Gas-turbine Hybrid ===
The Volvo ECC (Environmental Concept Car) was exhibited at the 1992 Paris Motor Show. The vehicles range on batteries alone was 90 miles (140 km), and when combined with a full tank of fuel for the turbine, about 415 miles (668 km).

=== Drive-E engines ===
Starting in the 2015 model year (Volvo S60, V60, and XC60), Volvo introduced a line of forced-induction four-cylinder engines, dubbed "Drive-E", to increase the efficiency of its models without sacrificing performance. These engines also debuted throughout the lineup that year, and also appeared in the second-generation Volvo XC90. Hybridized versions of these engines would, in theory, have enough power to match eight-cylinder engines.

== Production locations ==
Sweden

- Torslanda (Volvo Cars Torslanda – Torslandaverken), 1964–present
  - Volvo V60, Volvo XC60, Volvo V90, Volvo XC90
- Olofström (body components)
- Skövde (engines)
- Floby (engine components, brake discs)

Belgium

- Ghent (Volvo Car Gent), 1965–present
  - Volvo XC40, Volvo C40, Volvo S60, Volvo V60, Volvo EX30

China

- Chengdu (Zhongjia Automobile Manufacturing), 2013–present
  - Volvo S60L, Volvo XC60, Volvo EX30, Volvo EX90
- Daqing (Daqing Volvo Car Manufacturing), 2014–present
  - Volvo S90, Volvo S90L
- Luqiao (Zhejiang Geely Manufacturing), 2016–present
  - Volvo XC40
- Zhangjiakou (engines)

Malaysia

- Shah Alam (Volvo Car Manufacturing Malaysia), 1967–present
  - Volvo S60, Volvo S90, Volvo V60, Volvo EX30, Volvo XC40, Volvo XC60, Volvo XC90

India

- Bangalore (Volvo Auto India), 2017–present
  - Volvo S90, Volvo XC60, Volvo XC90

United States

- Ridgeville, South Carolina (Volvo Car North America), 2018–present
  - Volvo S60, Volvo EX90

== Other facilities ==
Sweden

- Gothenburg (Volvo Cars Headquarters, R&D and Safety Center)
- Hedared (Hällered Proving Ground)

== Engine types ==
Volvo uses in-line, or straight engines in its production vehicles. Volvo is also known for the application of the in-line 5-cylinder engine to its vehicle line up since its introduction in 1991 in the Volvo 850.

- Side valve six – fitted into the PV651/2, TR671/4, PV653/4, TR676/9, PV658/9, PV36, PV51/2, PV53/6, PV801/2, PV821/2, PV831/2 and PV60 from 1929 to 1958
- B4B and B14A – fitted into the Volvo PV and Volvo Duett from 1947 to 1956
- B16 (A and B) – fitted into the PV, Duett and Volvo Amazon from 1957 to 1960
- B18 and B20 – 1.8 L/2.0 L OHV 8v fitted into all Volvo models from 1961 to 1974 except 164 (and 1975 US spec 240 models).
- B19, B21, and B23 – fitted from 1975
- B200 and B230 – 2.0 L and 2.3 L, respectively, SOHC 8v fitted to 240, 360, 700, 940 series cars from 1985
- B204 and B234 – 2.0 L and 2.3 L DOHC 16 valve engines
- B27/B28 and B280 – 2.7 and 2.8 L SOHC 12v developed together with Renault and Peugeot
- B30 – fitted to all 164 models

== Transmissions ==
Volvo automatic transmissions in the past were made by the ZF Friedrichshafen company, but now the transmissions are co-developed with Aisin of Japan. Geartronic is Volvo Cars' name for its manumatic transmission.

=== Automatic transmissions ===
- Borg-Warner 35 transmission
- Borg-Warner 55 transmission
- Volvo AW70 series transmissions
  - Volvo AW70 transmission
  - Volvo AW71 transmission
  - Volvo AW72 transmission
- AW50-42 (4-speed automatic, FWD/AWD)
- AW55-50/51 (5-speed automatic, FWD/AWD)
- GM4T65EV/GT (4-speed GM automatic, FWD/AWD)
- AWTF-80 SC (6-speed automatic, FWD/AWD)
- ZF 4HP22 transmission (4-speed automatic transmission, 4x4)

=== Manual transmissions ===
- Volvo M30 transmission
- Volvo M40 transmission
- Volvo M400 & M410 transmission
- Volvo M41 transmission
- Volvo M45 transmission
- Volvo M46 transmission
- Volvo M47 transmission
- Volvo M50 transmission
- Volvo M51 transmission
- Volvo M56 transmission
- Volvo M58 transmission
- Volvo M59 transmission
- Volvo M65 transmission
- Volvo M66 transmission
- Volvo M90 transmission
- IB5
- MTX-75
- MMT6
- MPS6 (6-speed dual clutch Powershift, FWD)

== Motorsport ==
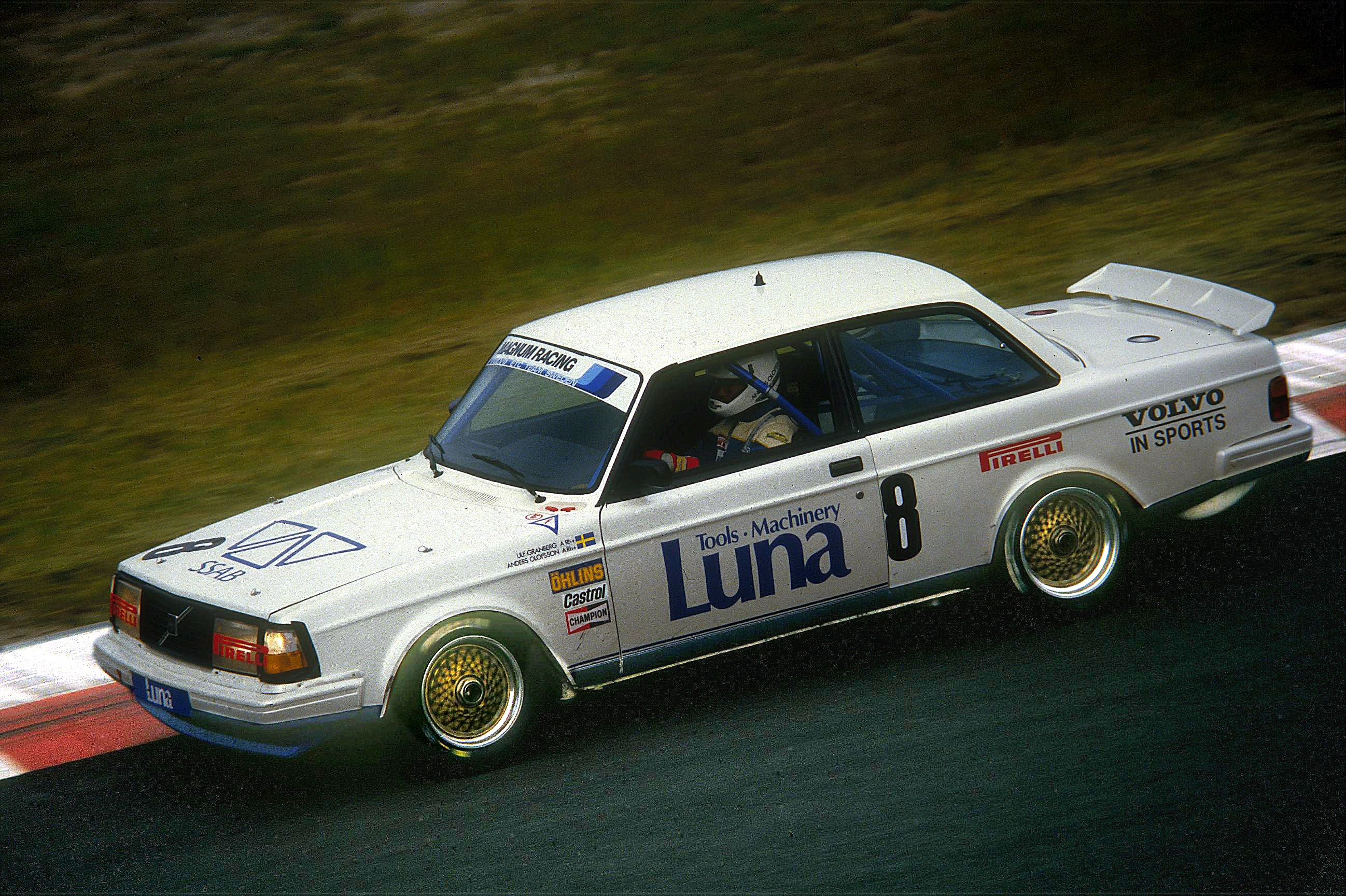
Anders Olofsson races a Volvo 240 at the Nürburgring in 1985.

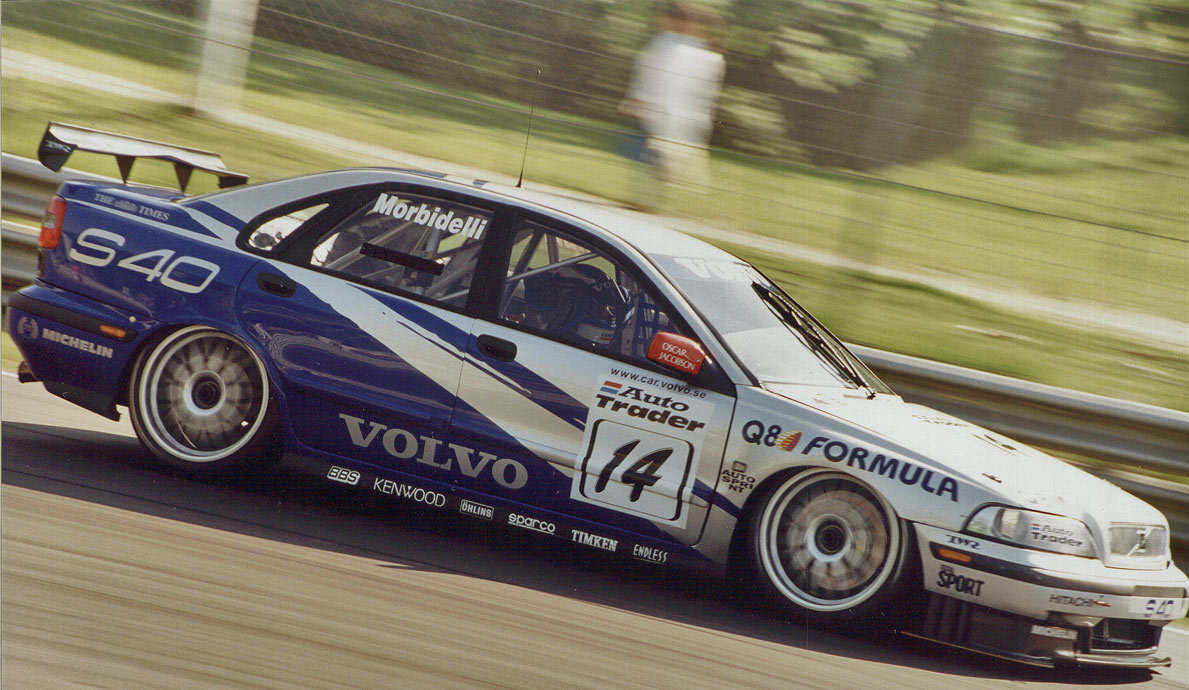
Gianni Morbidelli contesting the 1998 British Touring Car Championship in a Volvo S40.

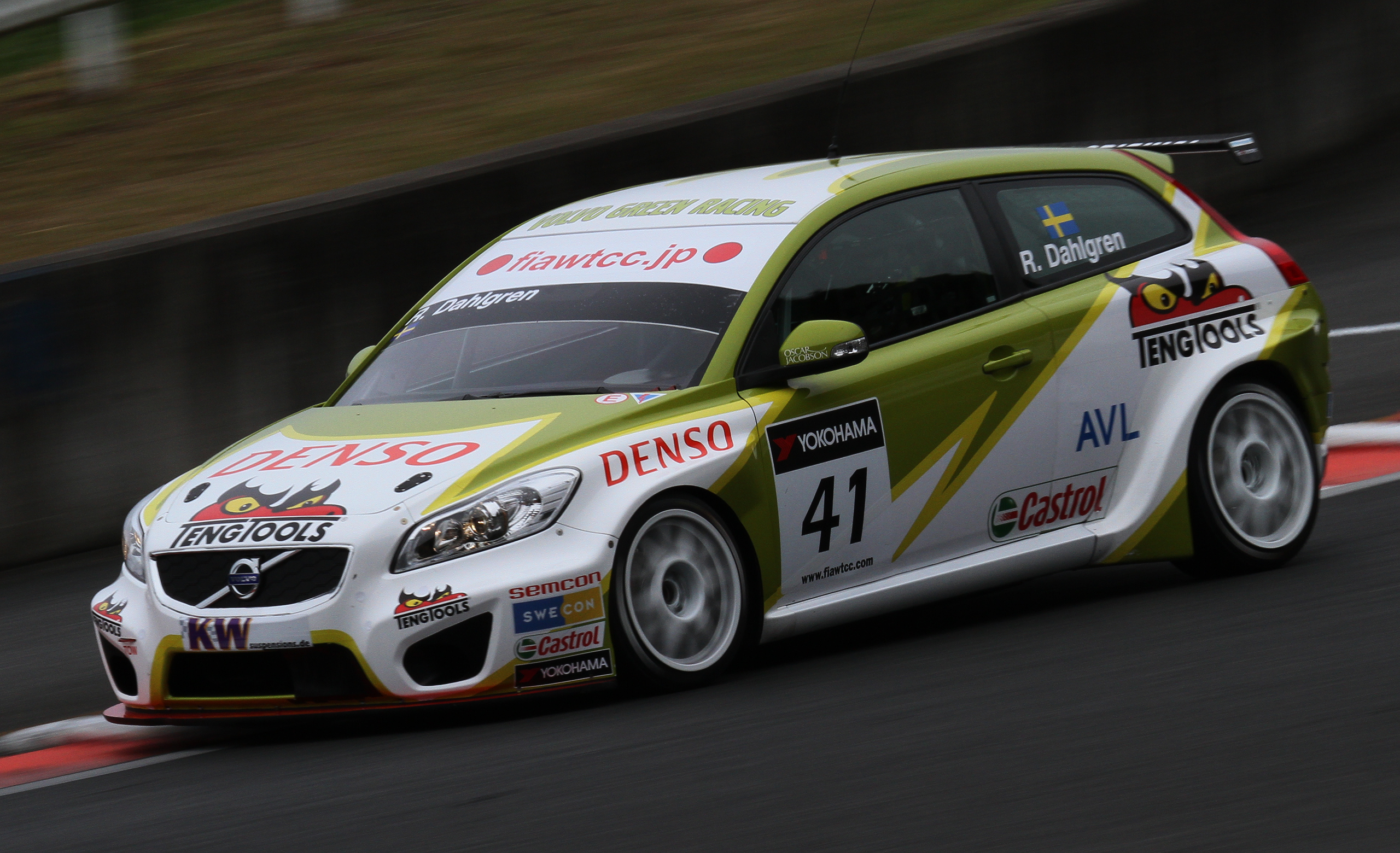
Robert Dahlgren racing a Volvo C30 WTCC at the 2010 WTCC Race of Japan.

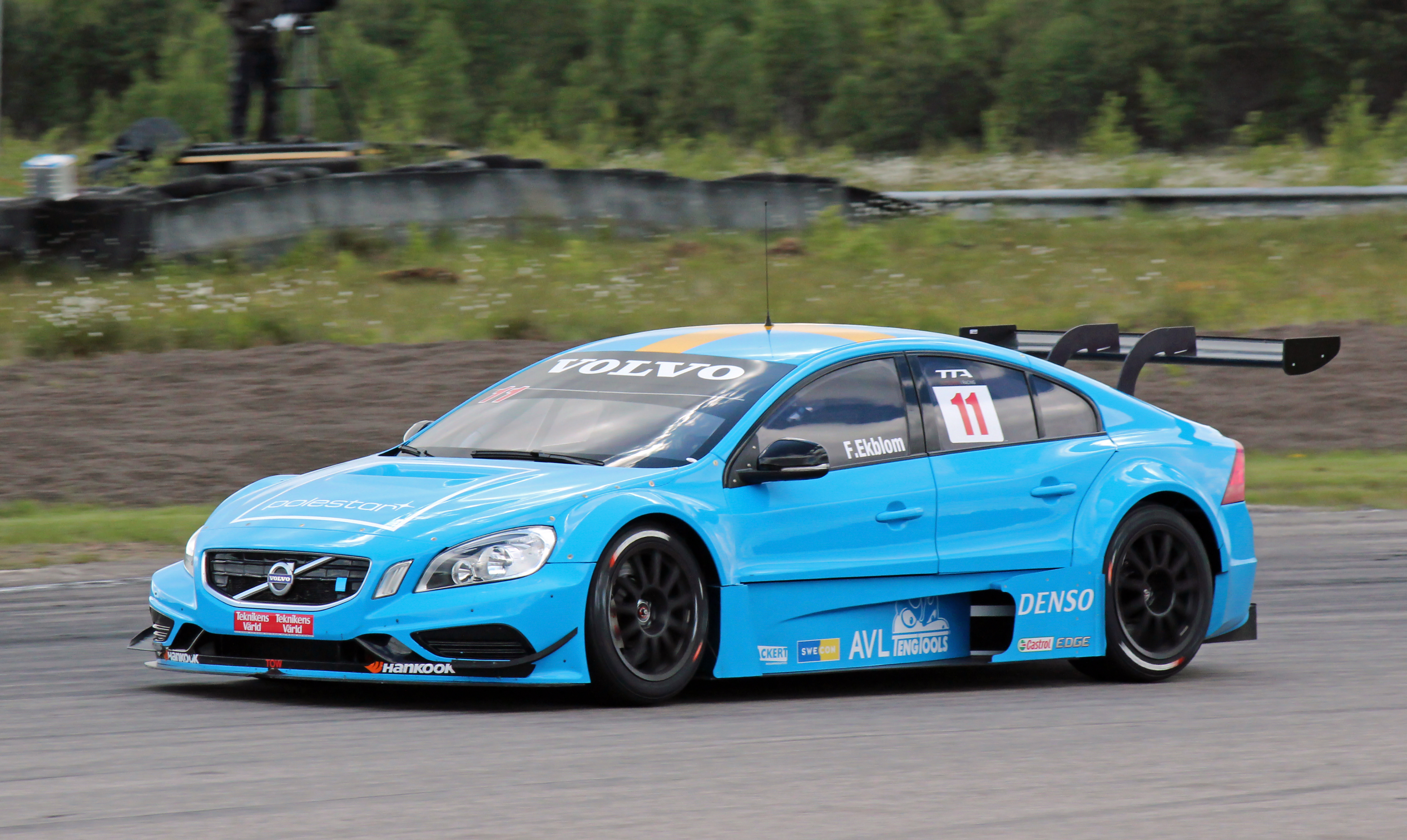
Fredrik Ekblom driving a Volvo S60 Mk.2 at Anderstorp Raceway as part of the 2012 TTA – Racing Elite League.

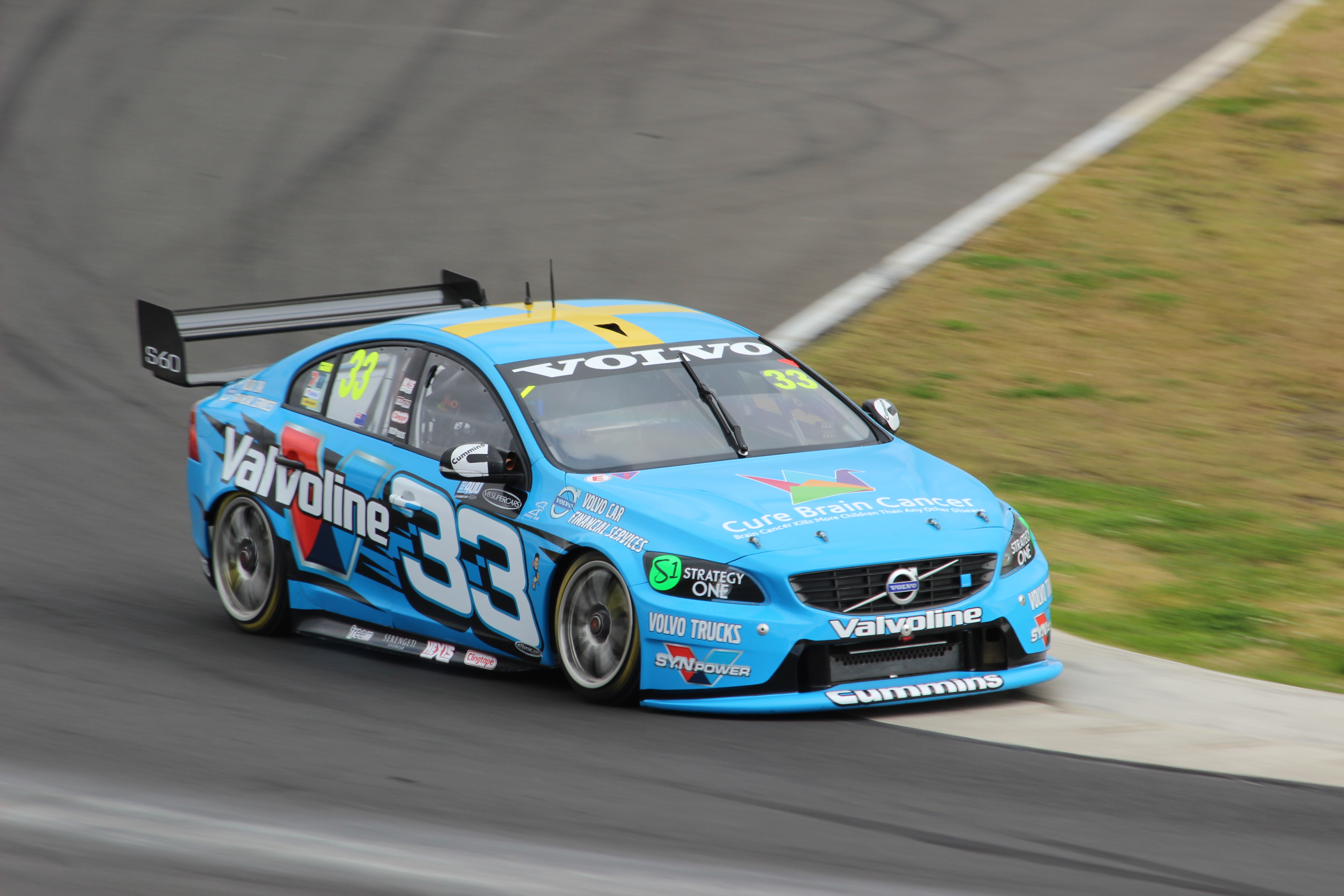
The Volvo S60 V8 Supercar driven by Scott McLaughlin at the 2014 Sydney Motorsport Park 400.

In 1959, Volvo set up its own motorsport department. This led to Volvo enjoying worldwide success in the motorsport arena throughout the early 1960s. In 1961, Gran Premio de Argentina Gunnar Andersson was appointed Volvo's competition department manager, signing a number of drivers, including Carl-Magnus Skogh, Tom Trana and Ewy Rosqvist, though he himself still continued to compete in rallies. In 1964, Volvo made heavy investments in the Safari Rally, entering four Volvo PV544s in the 1964 competition. A PV544, borrowed from Volvo and then modified and driven by Joginder and Jaswant Singh won the Safari Rally in 1965.

Volvo entered the European Touring Car Championship with the Volvo 240 Turbo in the 1980s. In the 1984 European Touring Car Championship, the Swedish team Sportpromotion won the EG Trophy at Zolder circuit, followed by placing second in the Mugello. In 1985, Volvo signed Swiss engine guru Ruedi Eggenberger to run its works team through Eggenberger Motorsport. Team drivers Gianfranco Brancatelli and Thomas Lindström led the 240T to victory in the 1985 ETCC.

Also in 1985, New Zealander Mark Petch had purchased a 240T from the Magnum team in Sweden (and claimed to run the only privateer Volvo 240T outside of Europe), and drivers Robbie Francevic and Michel Delcourt had also won the Wellington 500 street race in New Zealand in January. Francevic went on to finish 5th in the 1985 Australian Touring Car Championship, taking wins at Symmons Plains and Oran Park. The factory-supported Petch team also participated in the 1985 Bathurst 1000. Thomas Lindström later joined Francevic to win the 1986 Wellington 500. The Petch team become the Volvo Dealer Team in 1986, and expanded to two cars, with the other being for John Bowe, who had driven the Volvo with Francevic at the 1985 Bathurst 1000.

Volvo contracted Belgian based team RAS Sport to be its works team in the ETCC in 1986, following Eggenberger moving to race Ford Sierra's. This team included defending champion Lindström, joined by ex-Formula One and Grand Prix motorcycle racer Johnny Cecotto, as well as Ulf Granberg and Anders Olofsson. The team took wins at wins at Hockenheim, Anderstorp, Brno, Österreichring and Zolder, though the wins at Anderstorp and the Österreichring were disqualified due to the use of illegal fuel.

The 240T also entered the Guia Race, part of the Macau Grand Prix in 1985, 1986 and 1987, winning in both 1985 and 1986.

Volvo also saw success in the Deutsche Tourenwagen Meisterschaft (German Touring Car Championship), with a 240 Turbo driven by Per Stureson winning the 1985 DTM.

Volvo also entered the British Touring Car Championship in the 1990s with Tom Walkinshaw Racing. This partnership was responsible for the controversial 850 Estate racing cars, driven by Rickard Rydell and Jan Lammers and with a best qualifying placing of third and a best race finish of fifth, which was only rendered uncompetitive when the FIA allowed the use of aerodynamic aids in 1995. TWR then built and ran the works 850 Saloon, with six wins in 1995, and five wins in 1996, and a S40, with one win in 1997 in the BTCC, as well as Volvo placing third in the Manufacturers Championship, both in 1995 and 1996. In 1998, TWR Volvo won the British Touring Car Championship with Rickard Rydell driving the S40R.

Volvo also competed in the Super Touring category with the 850 across Europe and in Australia. Australian race car driver Peter Brock drove an 850 T5 with Tony Scott in the 1994 James Hardie 12 Hour production car race at Bathurst, finishing 25th. He also drove an 850 saloon in the 1996 Australian Super Touring Championship, placing sixth in the Drivers’ Championship.

Volvo regularly entered the S60 in the Swedish Touring Car Championship, where it finished 2nd in the drivers' championship twice and won the manufacturers' title once. The S60 continued to be raced after the formation of the Scandinavian Touring Car Championship, a merger of the Swedish and Danish touring car championships. Thed Björk won three consecutive titles from 2013 to 2015, driving an S60 prepared by Polestar Racing.

From 2002 to 2007, there was an S60 one-make racing series as a support series to the Swedish Touring Car Championship known as the S60 Challenge Cup, using 26 factory-modified S60s.

An S60 was driven by Robert Dahlgren in the Swedish round of the 2007 World Touring Car Championship.

The first generation S60 made its competitive debut in 2006, racing in the Speed World Challenge GT class. The second-generation model was introduced for the 2009 season. In 2010, its programme was expanded to include the SCAA Pro Racing World Challenge, where it won both the drivers' and manufacturers' championships in the GT class. The programme was expanded again in 2011, to include the Pirelli World Challenge.

In 2008, Volvo entered the Swedish Touring Car Championship with a C30 powered by bioethanol E85 fuel. Robert Dahlgren and Tommy Rustad were the drivers, finishing 5th and 10th respectively in the championship. Volvo had also signalled its intentions to enter the 2009 British Touring Car Championship with the same car.

Volvo entered the V8 Supercars Championship with two S60s in 2014 with Garry Rogers Motorsport, and were immediately competitive. Following ten pole positions and four race wins, Scott McLaughlin finished fifth in the championship and was awarded the Barry Sheene Medal.

== Marketing ==
The symbol for Mars has been used since ancient times to represent iron.

The name Volvo is Latin for "I roll".

=== Logo ===
The Volvo symbol is an ancient chemistry sign for iron. The iron sign is used to symbolize the strength of iron used in the car as Sweden is known for its quality iron. The diagonal line (a strip of metal) across the grille came about to hold the actual symbol, a circle with an arrow, in front of the radiator.

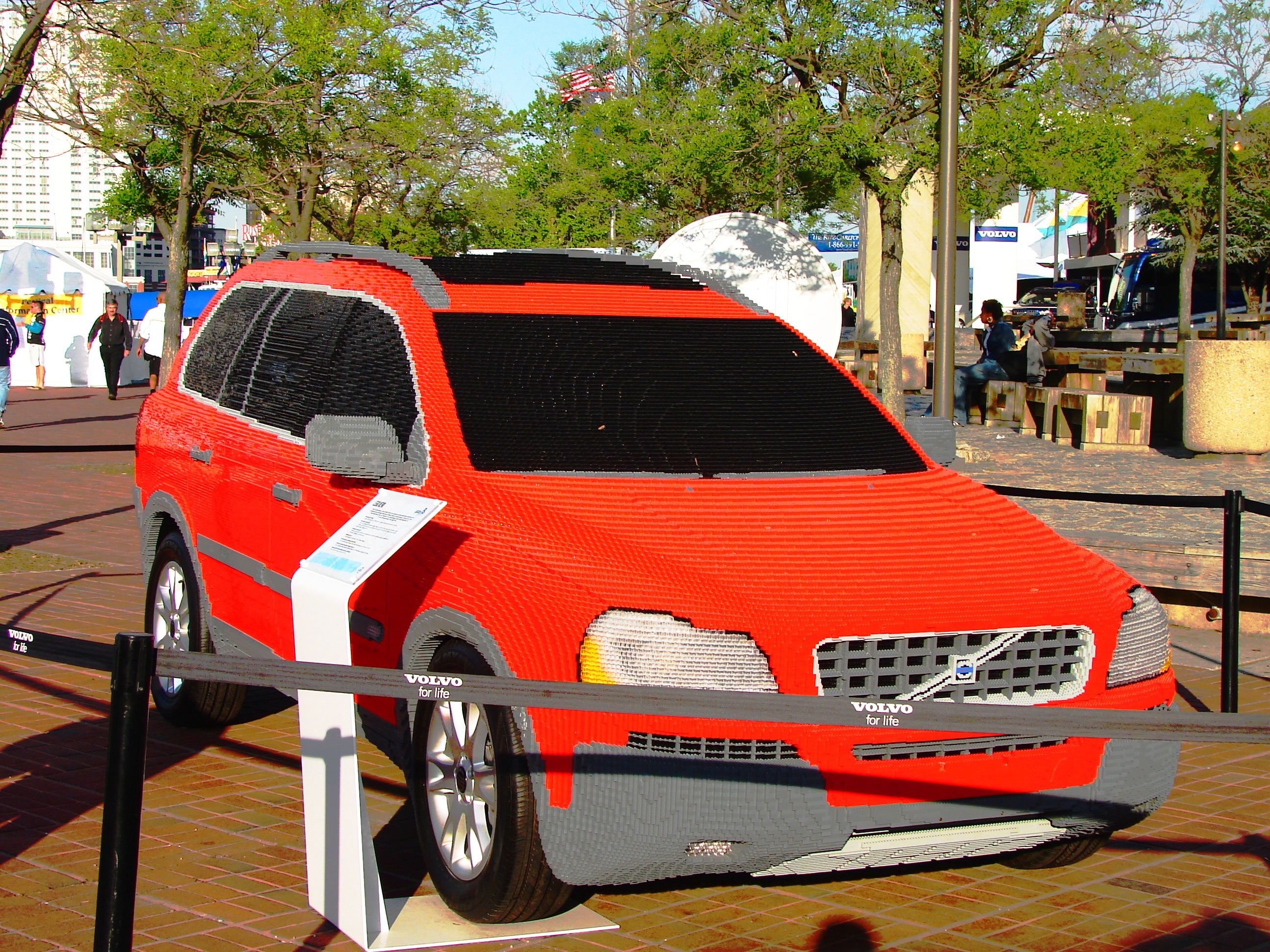
A model of a Volvo XC90 constructed from Lego bricks on display at Volvo Ocean Race – 2006 in Baltimore Inner Harbor

=== Sponsorship ===
Volvo has, since the 1950s, had special international sales programs for customers assigned abroad, for example Diplomat Sales, Military Sales and Expat Sales.

The Volvo trademark is now jointly owned (50/50) by Volvo Group and Volvo Car Group. One of the main promotional activities for the brand is the sailing Race Volvo Ocean Race, formerly known as the Whitbread Around the World Race. There is also a Volvo Baltic Race and Volvo Pacific Race, and Volvo likes to encourage its image by sponsoring golf tournaments all over the world including major championship events called the Volvo Masters and Volvo China Open.

Volvo sponsored the Volvo Ocean Race, the world's leading round-the-world yacht race for the first time in 2001–02. The next edition was to take place between 2011 and 2012. Volvo has also had a long-standing commitment to the International Sailing Federation (ISAF) and is involved in the Volvo/ISAF World Youth Sailing Championships since 1997.

In 2011, Volvo Cars is the main sponsor of the winter sports and music festival Snowbombing in Austria.

In 2012, Volvo signed NBA star Jeremy Lin to an endorsement agreement for two years to participate in Volvo's corporate and marketing activities as a "brand ambassador" for Volvo Car Corp.

In 2015, Volvo signed a deal with Chennaiyin FC, a football franchise team of the Indian Super League as a side shirt sponsor.

=== Video games ===
In May 2009, Volvo – The Game was released. It was developed by Simbin Studios (now Sector3 Studios).

== Volvo trademark lawsuit ==
In 1990, Volvo Cars filed a lawsuit against Hong Kong-based Club Volvo night club for infringement in Hong Kong High Court. The lawsuit ended with settlement where the night club paid 1 dollar to Volvo Cars. Since then, Club Volvo had been renamed to Club Borubo (the Japanese pronunciation of "Volvo"), and then Club Bboss (reference to Big Boss).

== See also ==
- British Touring Car Championship (BTCC)
- Polestar (in-house performance division)
- Polestar Racing (STCC)
- Garry Rogers Motorsport (V8 Supercars)
- Saab Automobile
- The Saint (TV series)
- Tom Trana
- Volvo – The Game
- Volvo Penta
- Tom Walkinshaw Racing (TWR)
- Jan Wilsgaard
- List of Volvo passenger cars
