= List of Volvo vehicles =

The following is a list of Volvo vehicles indexed by year of introduction.

== Model history ==
Production	Model	Class	Image
=== 1920s ===
1927–1929	ÖV4/PV4	Small family car	
1929–1937	PV650 Series	Large family car	
=== 1930s ===
1930–1937	TR670 Series	Taxicab	
1935–1938	PV36 Carioca	Luxury car	
1936–1945	PV51 Series	Large family car	
1938–1958	PV800 Series	Taxicab	
=== 1940s ===
1944–1966	PV444/544	Small family car	
1946–1950	PV60	Luxury car	
=== 1950s ===
1953–1969	Duett	Station wagon	
1956–1957	P1900	Sports car	
1956–1970	Amazon	Small family car	
=== 1960s ===
1961–1973	P1800	Sports car	
1966–1974	140 Series	Large family car	
1968–1975	164	Luxury car	
=== 1970s ===
1974–1993	240/260	Large family car	
1975–1980	66	Small family car	
1976–1991	340/360	Small family car	
1977–1983	262C	Coupe	
=== 1980s ===
1982–1992	740/760	Large family car	
1986–1995	480	Compact car	
1986–1991	780	Coupe	
1987–1997	440/460	Small family car	
=== 1990s ===
1990–1996	940/960	Large family car/Full-size car/Mid-size luxury car	
1991–1997	850	Large family car/Mid-size car	
1995–2004	S40/V40	Small family car/Compact car	
1996–2000	S70/V70	Large family car/Mid-size car	
1996–1998	S90/V90	Executive car/Full-size car	
1996–2005	C70	Mid-size car (Coupe/Convertible)	
1998–2006	S80	Executive car/Full-size car/Mid-size luxury car	
=== 2000s ===
2000–2009	S60	Compact executive car/Mid-size car	
2000–2007	V70/XC70	Mid-size car/Large family car (Station wagon)	
2003–2014	XC90	Mid-size crossover SUV	
2003–2012	S40	Small family car/Compact car/Subcompact executive car	
2004–2012	V50	Small family car/Compact car/Subcompact executive car	
2006–2013	C30	Compact car	
2006–2013	C70	Full-size car/Cabriolet	
2006–2016	S80	Full-size car/Executive car	
2007–2016	V70/XC70	Full-size car (Station wagon)	
2008–2017	XC60	Compact crossover SUV	
=== 2010s ===
2010–2018	S60/V60	Mid-size car/Compact executive car	
2012–2019	V40	Compact car/Small family car	
2014–2016	XC Classic	Mid-size crossover SUV	
2014–	XC90	Mid-size crossover SUV	
2016–	S90	Full-size car/Executive car/Mid-size luxury car	
2016–2025	V90	Full-size car/Executive car/Mid-size luxury car	
2017–	XC60	Compact crossover SUV	
2017–	XC40	Subcompact crossover SUV	
2018–2024	S60	Mid-size car/Entry-level luxury car/Compact executive car	
2018–	V60	Mid-size car/Entry-level luxury car/Compact executive car	
2019–	EX40	Battery electric subcompact crossover SUV	
=== 2020s ===
2021–	EC40	Battery electric subcompact crossover SUV	
2023–	EX30	Battery electric subcompact crossover SUV	
2024–	EX90	Battery electric mid-size luxury SUV	
2024–	EM90	Battery electric luxury minivan	
2025–	ES90	Battery electric full-size car/Executive car	
2025–	XC70	Plug-in hybrid mid-size crossover SUV	
2026–	EX60	Battery electric compact crossover SUV	

== See also ==
- List of automobiles
- List of Volvo engines
