= Volvo PV =

Volvo PV is a model name that Volvo used on a number of automobiles during the company's first forty years:

- 1928–1929 Volvo PV4
- 1929–1936 Volvo PV650 Series
- 1935–1938 Volvo PV36
- 1936–1945 Volvo PV51 Series
- 1938–1958 Volvo PV800 Series
- 1946–1950 Volvo PV60
- 1947–1958 Volvo PV444
- 1953–1960 Volvo PV445
- 1958–1965 Volvo PV544

Volvo PV is also the short form for Volvo Personvagnar (dir.trans: Volvo person wagon), the Swedish name for Volvo Cars, as opposed to Volvo LV, or Volvo Lastvagnar (dir.trans: Volvo load wagon), the Swedish name for Volvo Trucks.

== Gallery ==
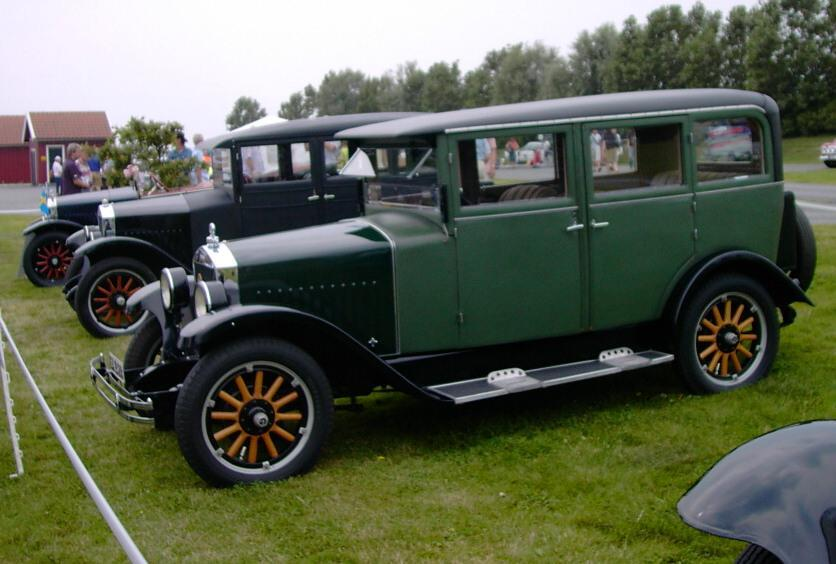
Volvo PV4

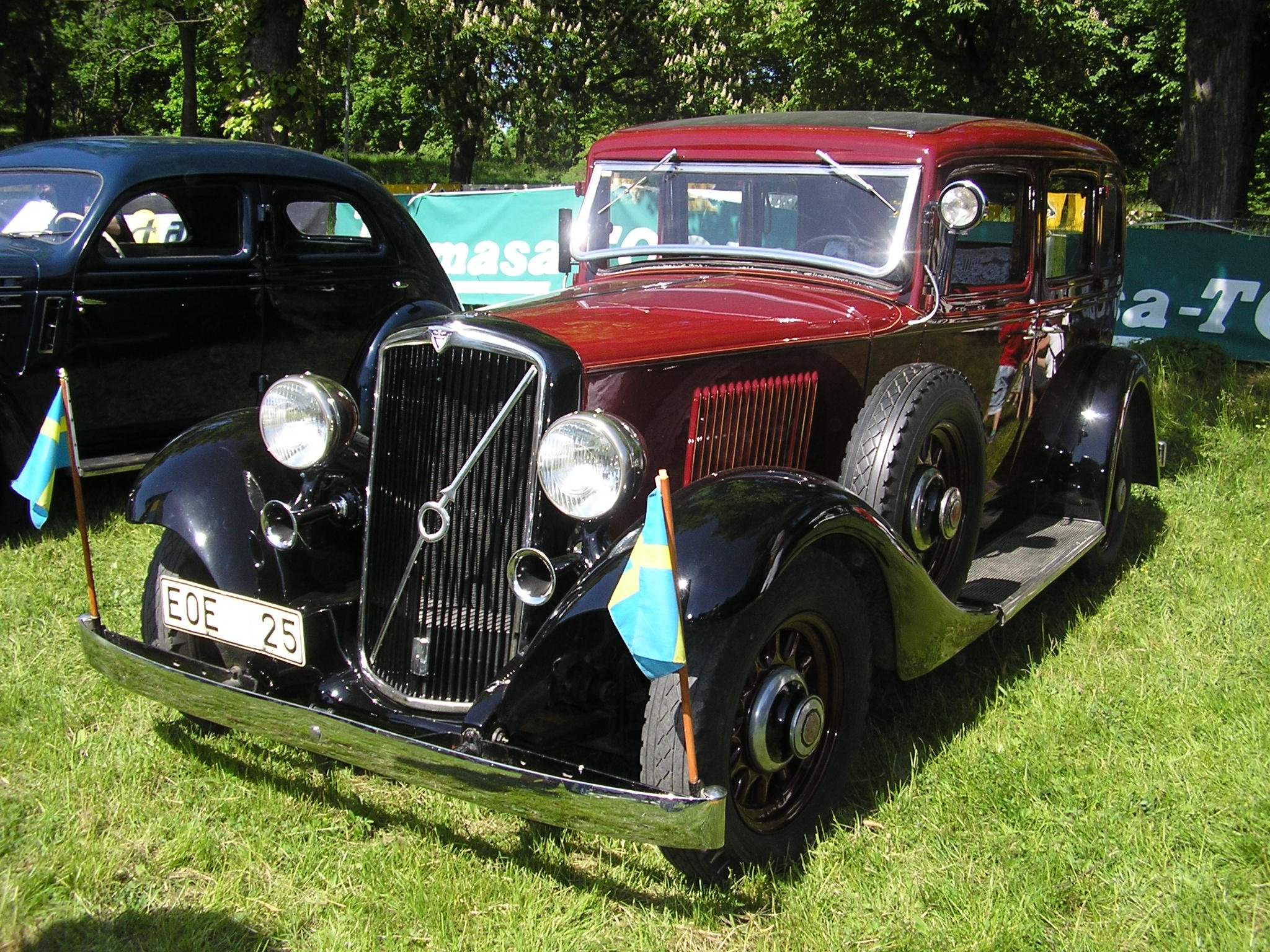
Volvo PV659

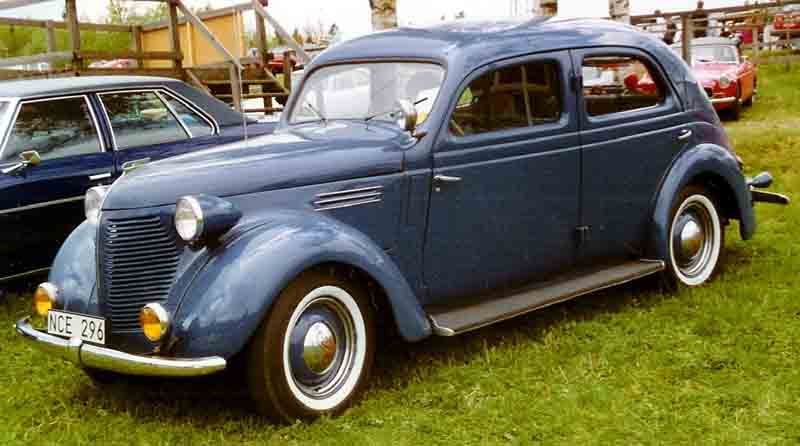
Volvo PV53

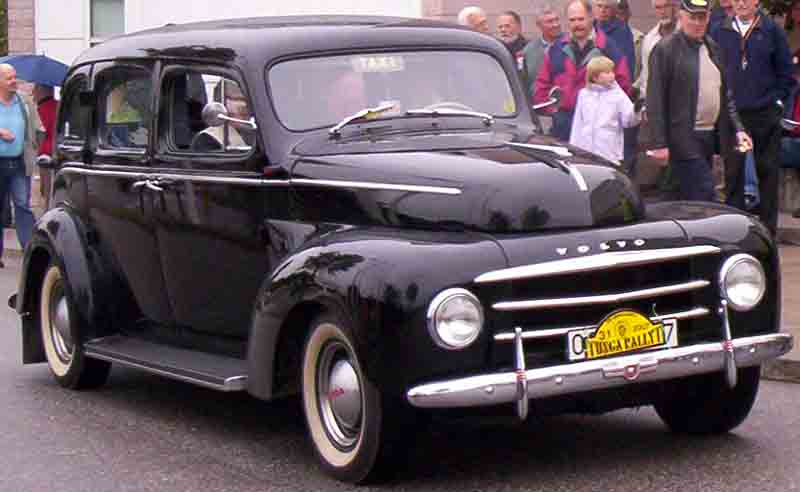
Volvo PV831

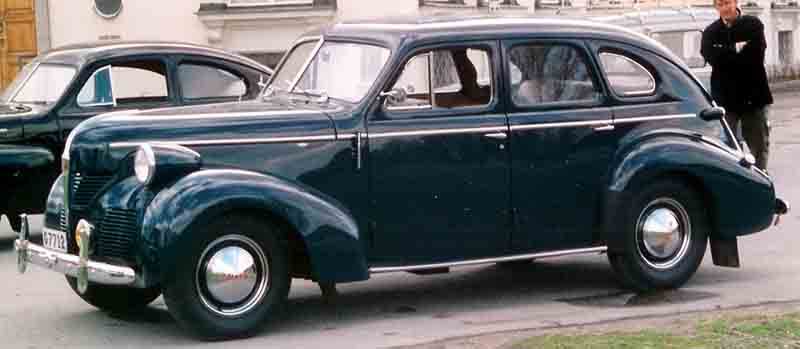
Volvo PV60

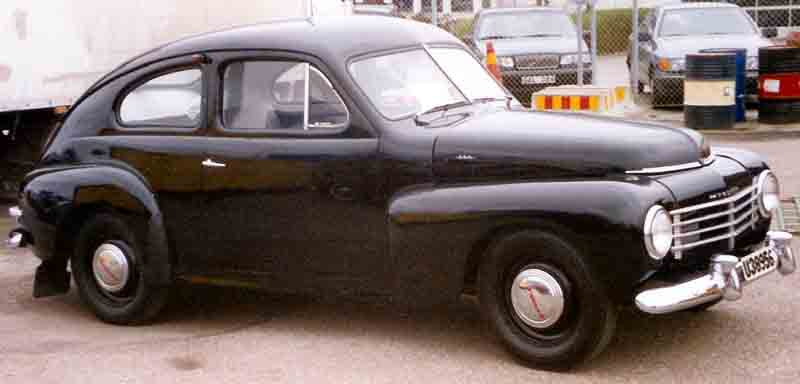
Volvo PV444

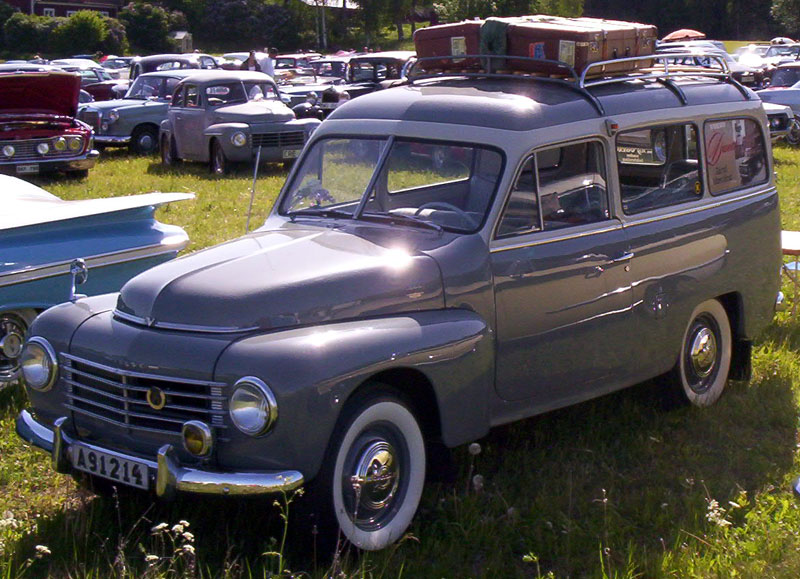
Volvo PV445

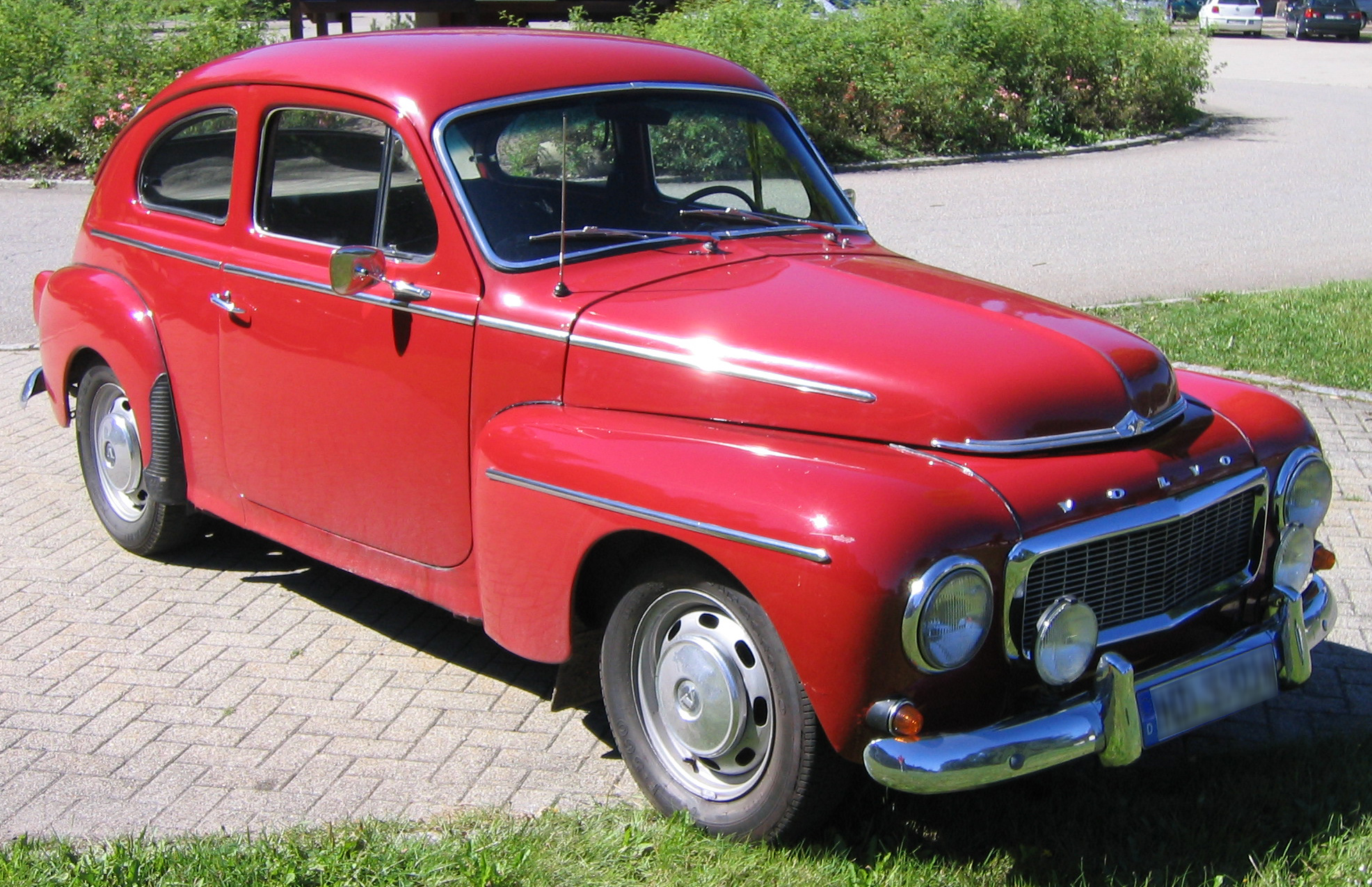
Volvo PV544
