= Volvo LV76-series =

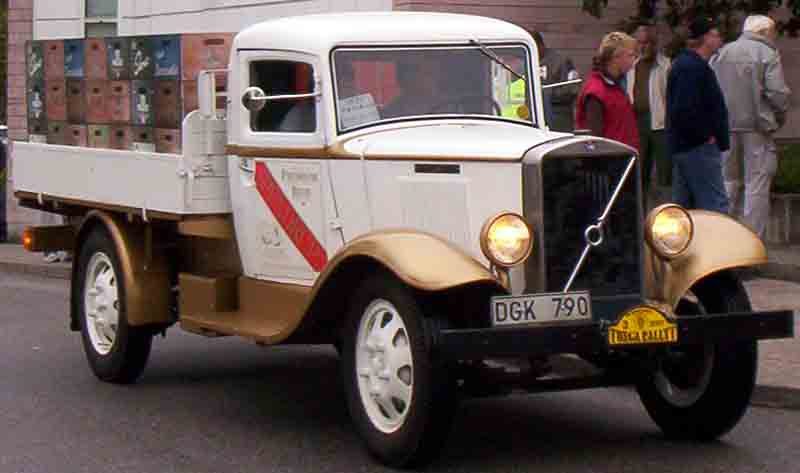

Overview
- Manufacturer: Volvo
- Production: 1934–1940; approx. 2,250 produced

Body and chassis
- Class: Light truck

Powertrain
- Engine: 3.7L EB I6 (1934); 3.7L EC I6 (1935–1940)
- Transmission: 4 speed non-syncro manual

Dimensions
- Wheelbase: 3.4–3.8 m (133.9–149.6 in)
- Curb weight: 3,000–4,750 kg (6,614–10,472 lb) (gross weight)

Chronology
- Predecessor: Volvo LV60-series
- Successor: Volvo Sharpnose

The Volvo LV76-79 was a light truck produced by Swedish automaker Volvo between 1934 and 1940.

== History ==
In 1934 Volvo introduced its LV76 series. The truck was available in three versions: LV76 with a payload of 1 tonne, LV77 with a payload of 1.25 tonnes and LV78 with a payload of 1.5 tonnes. In 1935 the truck was modernized with a streamlined radiator cover and the larger EC engine.

In 1936 the series was supplemented with the sturdier LV79.

== Engines ==
Model	Year	Engine	Displacement	Power	Type
LV76-78	1934	Volvo EB: I6 sv	3,366 cc (205.4 cu in)	65 bhp (48 kW)	Petrol engine
LV76-79	1935–40	Volvo EC: I6 sv	3,670 cc (224 cu in)	75 bhp (56 kW)	Petrol engine
LV79	1940	Volvo ECG: I6 sv	3,670 cc (224 cu in)	50 bhp (37 kW)	Wood gas conversion
