= Volvo Sharpnose =

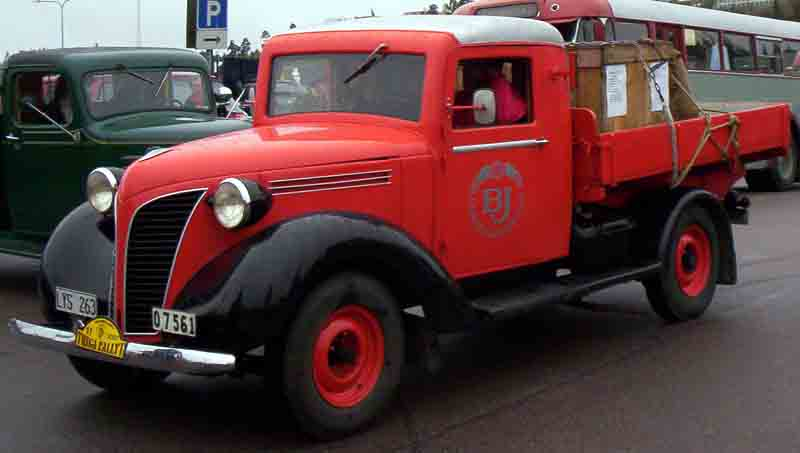

Overview
- Manufacturer: Volvo Trucks
- Also called: Volvo LV101 – 112; Volvo L201 – 202
- Production: 1938–1950; approx. 6,300 produced

Body and chassis
- Class: Light truck
- Related: Volvo PV800 Series

Powertrain
- Engine: 3.7L EC I6 (1938–1946); 3.7L ED I6 (1947–1950)
- Transmission: 4-speed non-syncro manual

Dimensions
- Wheelbase: 3.1–4.1 m (122.0–161.4 in)
- Curb weight: 2,800–5,000 kg (6,172.9–11,023.1 lb) (gross weight)

Chronology
- Predecessor: Volvo LV76-series
- Successor: Volvo L340

The Volvo LV101-112, or the Sharpnose was a light truck produced by Swedish automaker Volvo between 1938 and 1950.

== History ==
In 1938 Volvo presented its light LV101-series truck, affectionately known as the "Sharpnose". At the same time Volvo introduced the taxicab PV800. The two models series shared many parts, including the engine, radiator cover and bonnet. The smallest model LV101 was mechanically almost identical to the taxicab, while the larger LV102 was a "genuine" truck.

In 1940 the program was supplemented with the heavier LV110/111/112, built on three different wheelbases.

After the Second World War Volvo updated the truck series with the stronger ED engine, renaming it L201/202.

== Engines ==
Model	Year	Engine	Displacement	Power	Type
LV101-112	1938–46	Volvo EC: I6 sv	3,670 cc (224 cu in)	86 bhp (64 kW)	Petrol engine
LV101-112	1940–45	Volvo ECG: I6 sv	3,670 cc (224 cu in)	50 bhp (37 kW)	Wood gas conversion
L201-202	1947–50	Volvo ED: I6 sv	3,670 cc (224 cu in)	90 bhp (67 kW)	Petrol engine

== Gallery ==
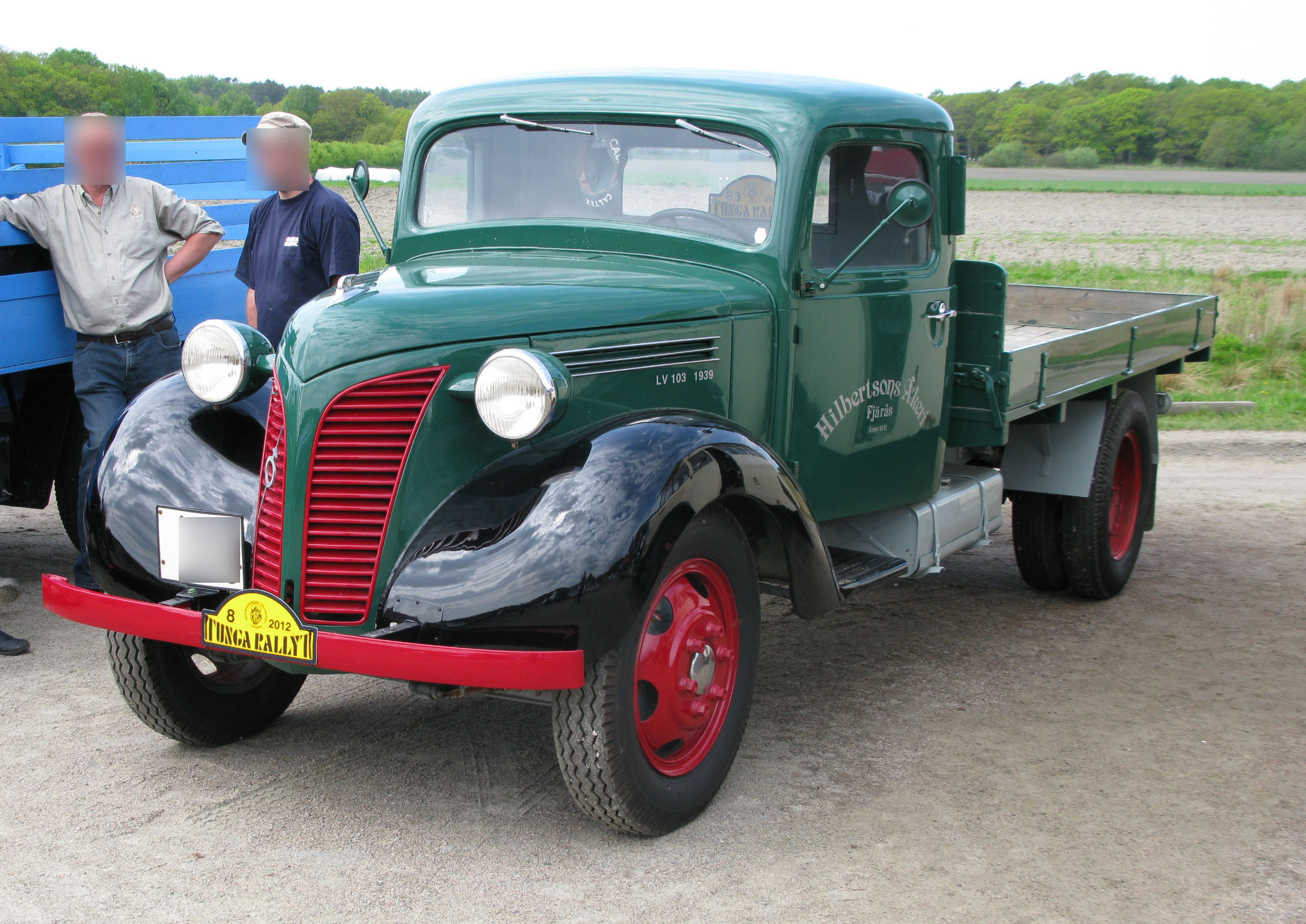
1939 Volvo LV103

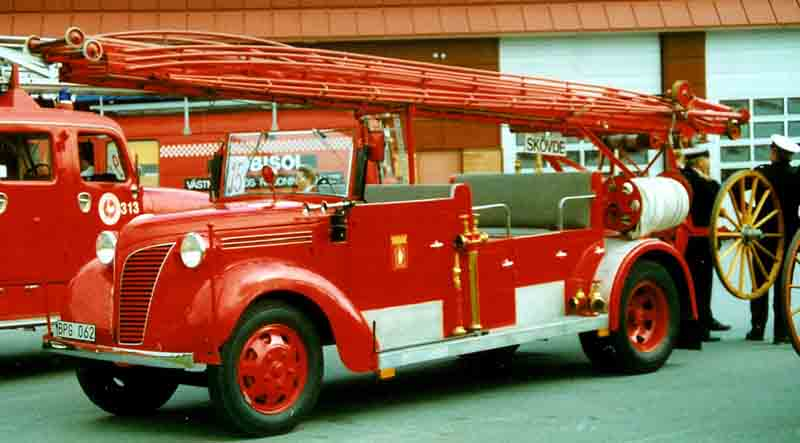
1941 Volvo LV111 fire engine
