= Penta DB =

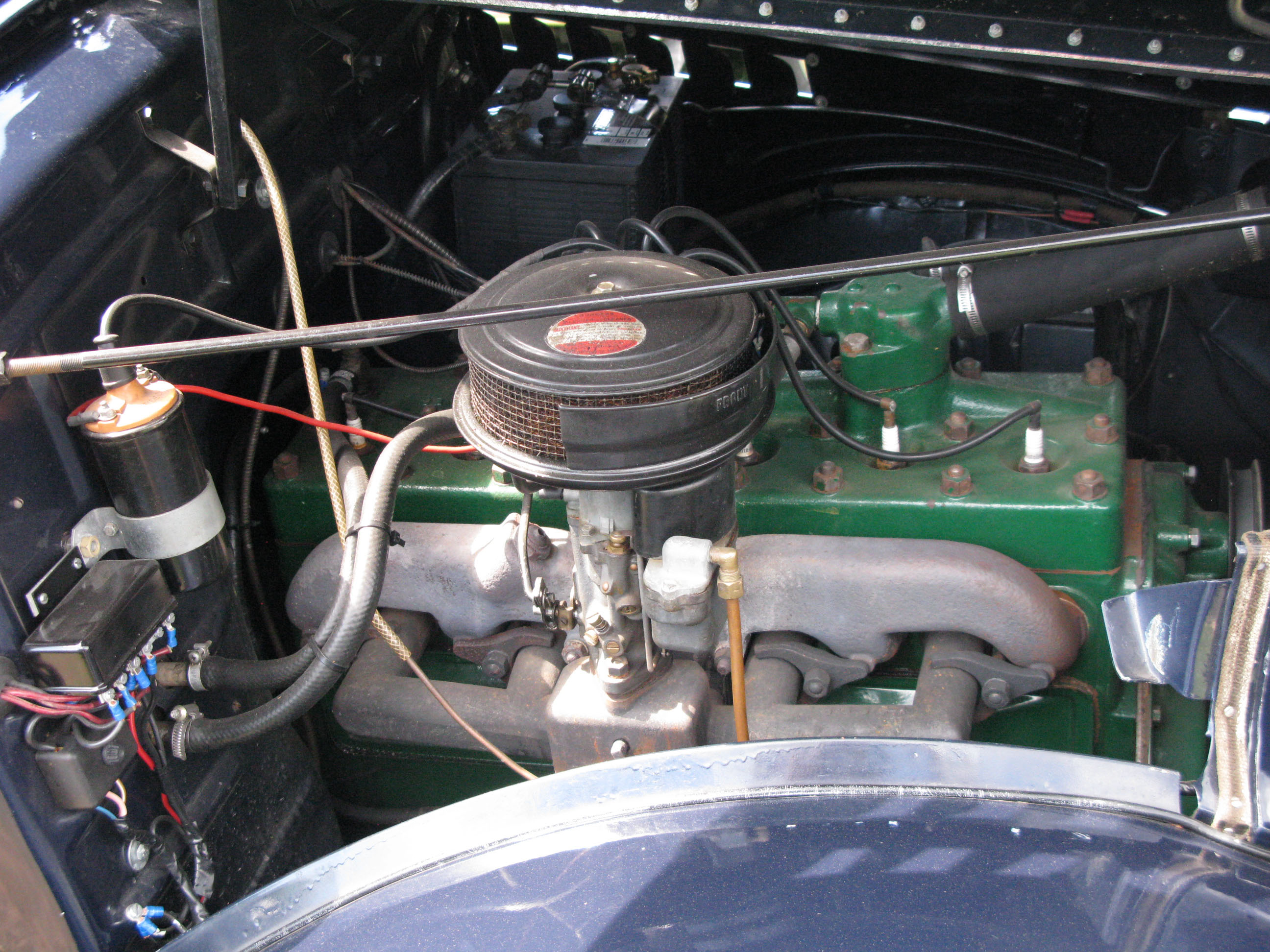
EC engine in a Volvo PV51.

Penta DB was an engine model produced by AB Pentaverken. The 1929 introduced engine was a side-valve engine with a cast-iron block and seven main bearings, and the first straight-six engine used in Volvos. Four other variants followed after. These engines powered all six-cylinder Volvo passenger cars and taxi cabs, as well as the company's small trucks between 1929 and 1958.

Versions:

Version	Year	Bore × stroke	Displacement	Power	Application	Notes
DB	1929-32	76.2×110 mm	3,010 cc (184 cu in)	55 hp (41 kW; 56 PS)	PV651-652, TR671-674, LV60-65	
EB	1932-35	79.4×110 mm	3,266 cc (199.3 cu in)	65 hp (48 kW; 66 PS)	PV652-654, TR673-679, LV60-65, LV71-75, LV76-79, Sisu S-321	
EC	1935-45	84.14×110 mm	3,670 cc (224 cu in)	86 hp (64 kW; 87 PS)	PV658-659, PV36, PV51-56, TR701-704, PV801-802, LV76-79, LV101-112, LV81-86, LV120-123	
ECG	1940-45	84.14×110 mm	3,670 cc (224 cu in)	50 hp (37 kW; 51 PS)	PV51-56, PV801-802, LV76-79, LV101-112	War time wood gas conversion
ED	1946-58	84.14×110 mm	3,670 cc (224 cu in)	90 hp (67 kW; 91 PS)	PV60, PV821-834, L201-202, L221-224, L340, L360	

== See also ==
- List of Volvo engines
