= Volvo LV4 =

Light truck produced by Volvo

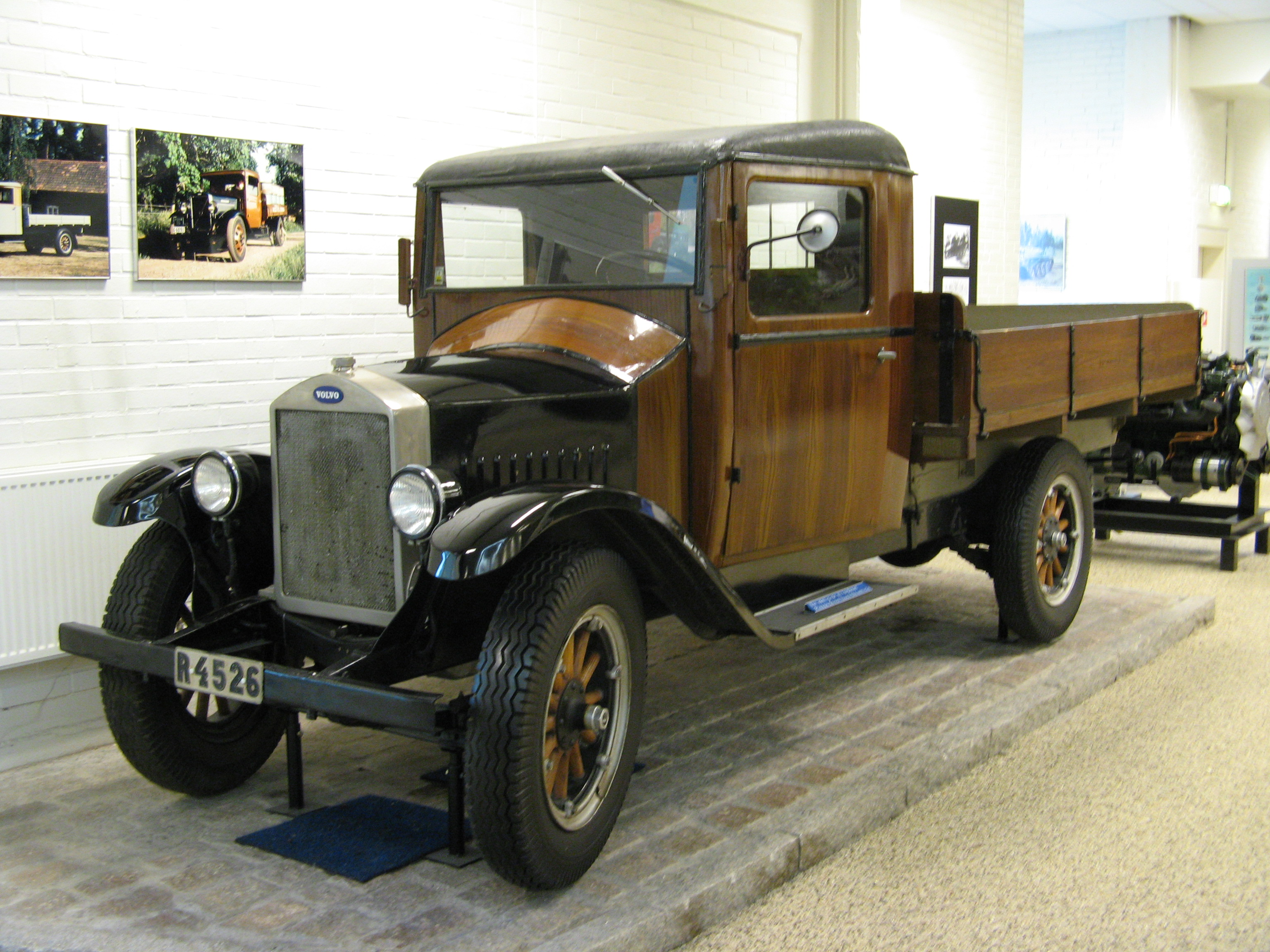

Overview
- Manufacturer: Volvo Trucks
- Also called: Volvo LV Series 1 and 2
- Production: 1928–1930, approx. 995 produced

Body and chassis
- Class: Light truck
- Related: Volvo ÖV 4

Powertrain
- Engine: 1.9L DA I4
- Transmission: 3-speed non-syncro manual

Dimensions
- Wheelbase: 3.3–3.7 m (129.9–145.7 in)
- Curb weight: 3,000 kg (6,614 lb) (gross weight)

Chronology
- Successor: Volvo LV60-series

The Volvo LV4 was a light truck produced by Swedish automaker Volvo between 1928 and 1930. The designation LV4 stands for LastVagn ("truck"), 4 cylinders.

== History ==
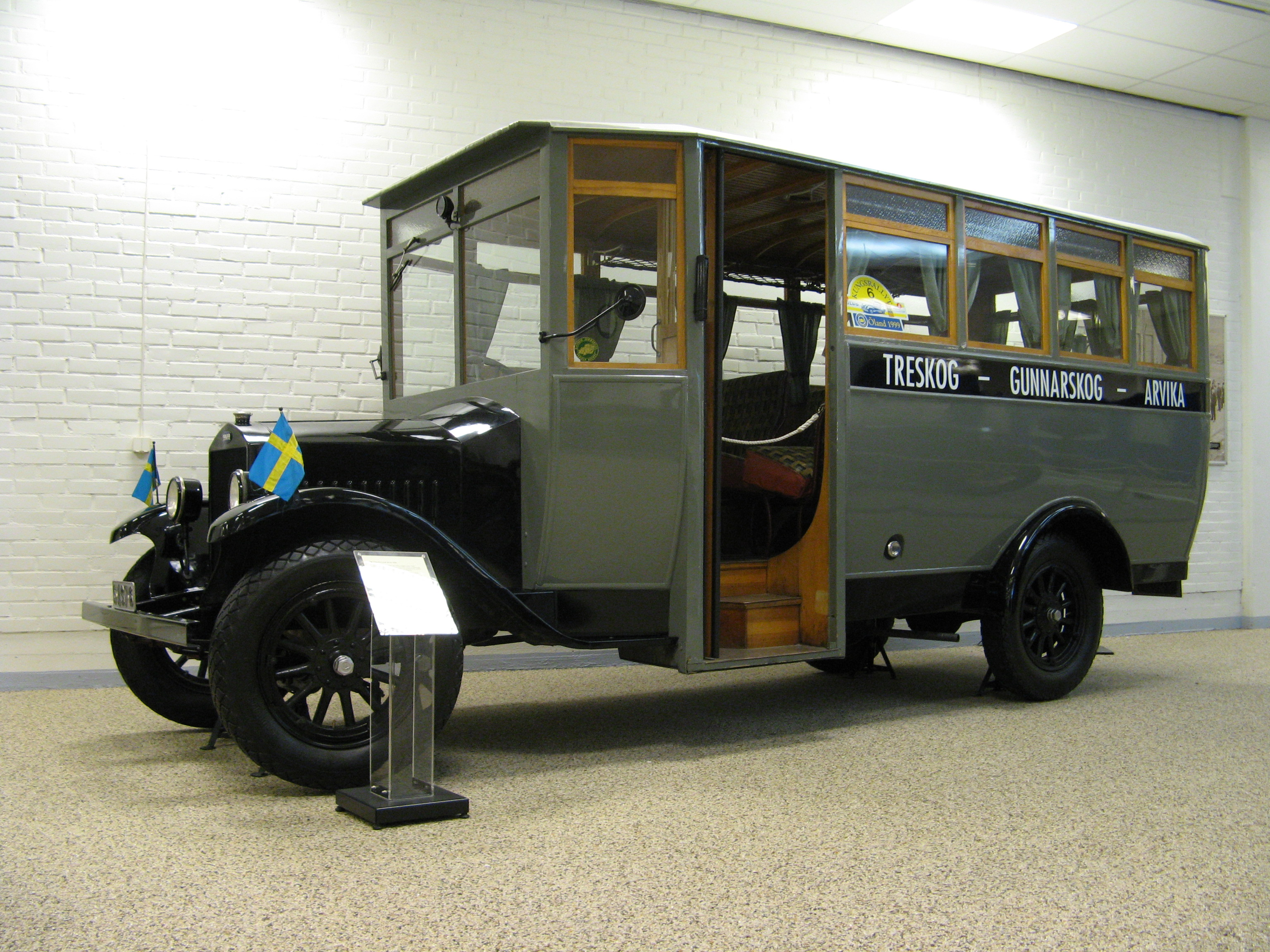
1928 Volvo LV45 bus.

Volvo introduced its first truck, LV Series 1, in early 1928. The truck shared many components with Volvos passenger cars ÖV4 and PV4, including powertrain, but the truck had a more powerful chassis which was built on two different wheelbases: 3.3 and 3.7 m. Despite the small four-cylinder side-valve engine the truck was a sales success, unlike the passenger cars.

After an initial series of 500 Series 1 trucks, Volvo presented the stronger LV Series 2 in the fall of 1928. Many components had been strengthened to better fit a truck and the axle track had been widened.
