= Volvo L340 =

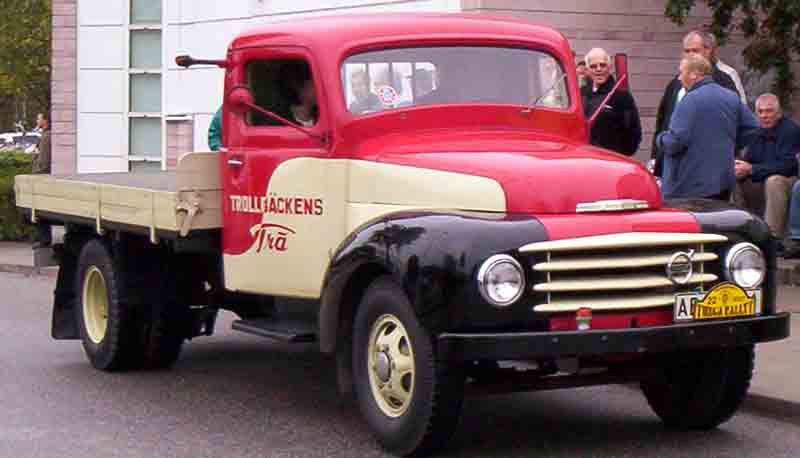

Overview
- Manufacturer: Volvo
- Production: 1950 – 1956, approx. 4,900 produced

Body and chassis
- Class: Light truck
- Related: Volvo PV800

Powertrain
- Engine: 3,670 cc (3.7 L) ED I6
- Transmission: 4 speed non-syncro manual

Dimensions
- Wheelbase: 3.5–3.9 m (137.8–153.5 in)
- Curb weight: 5,200 kg (11,464 lb) (gross weight)

Chronology
- Predecessor: Volvo Sharpnose
- Successor: Volvo Snabbe

The Volvo L340 was a light truck produced by Swedish automaker Volvo between 1950 and 1956.

== History ==
The L340, introduced in 1950, was an update of the predecessor L201/202. The mechanical components were the same, but the truck got a more modern front end, derived from the contemporary taxicab PV831/832.
