= Volvo LV60-series =

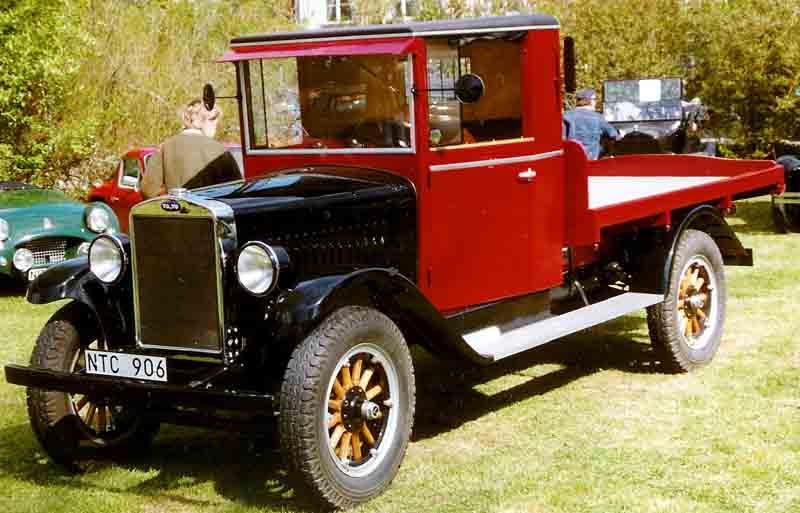

Overview
- Manufacturer: Volvo Trucks
- Also called: Volvo LV Series 3 and 4
- Production: 1929–1932; approx. 2,970 produced

Body and chassis
- Class: Light truck

Powertrain
- Engine: 3.0L DB I6 (1929–1931); 3.7L EB I6 (1932)
- Transmission: 4 speed non-syncro manual

Dimensions
- Wheelbase: 3.3–3.7 m (129.9–145.7 in)
- Curb weight: 4,100–4,700 kg (9,039.0–10,361.7 lb) (gross weight)

Chronology
- Predecessor: Volvo LV4
- Successor: Volvo LV76-series

The Volvo LV60-series was a light truck produced by Swedish automaker Volvo between 1929 and 1932.

== History ==
Volvo soon realized that the company's first four-cylinder side-valve engine simply wasn't powerful enough so the company brought out a more powerful six-cylinder engine for its automobiles and trucks. The new LV60 truck was introduced in the summer of 1929. Apart from the larger engine and a four speed gear box it was identical to its predecessor, the LV Series 2.

== Engines ==
| Model | Year | Engine | Displacement | Power | Type |
|---|---|---|---|---|---|
| LV60-65 | 1929–31 | Volvo DB: I6 sv | 3,010 cc (184 cu in) | 55 bhp (41 kW) | Petrol engine |
| LV60-65 | 1932 | Volvo EB: I6 sv | 3,366 cc (205.4 cu in) | 65 bhp (48 kW) | Petrol engine |

== Gallery ==
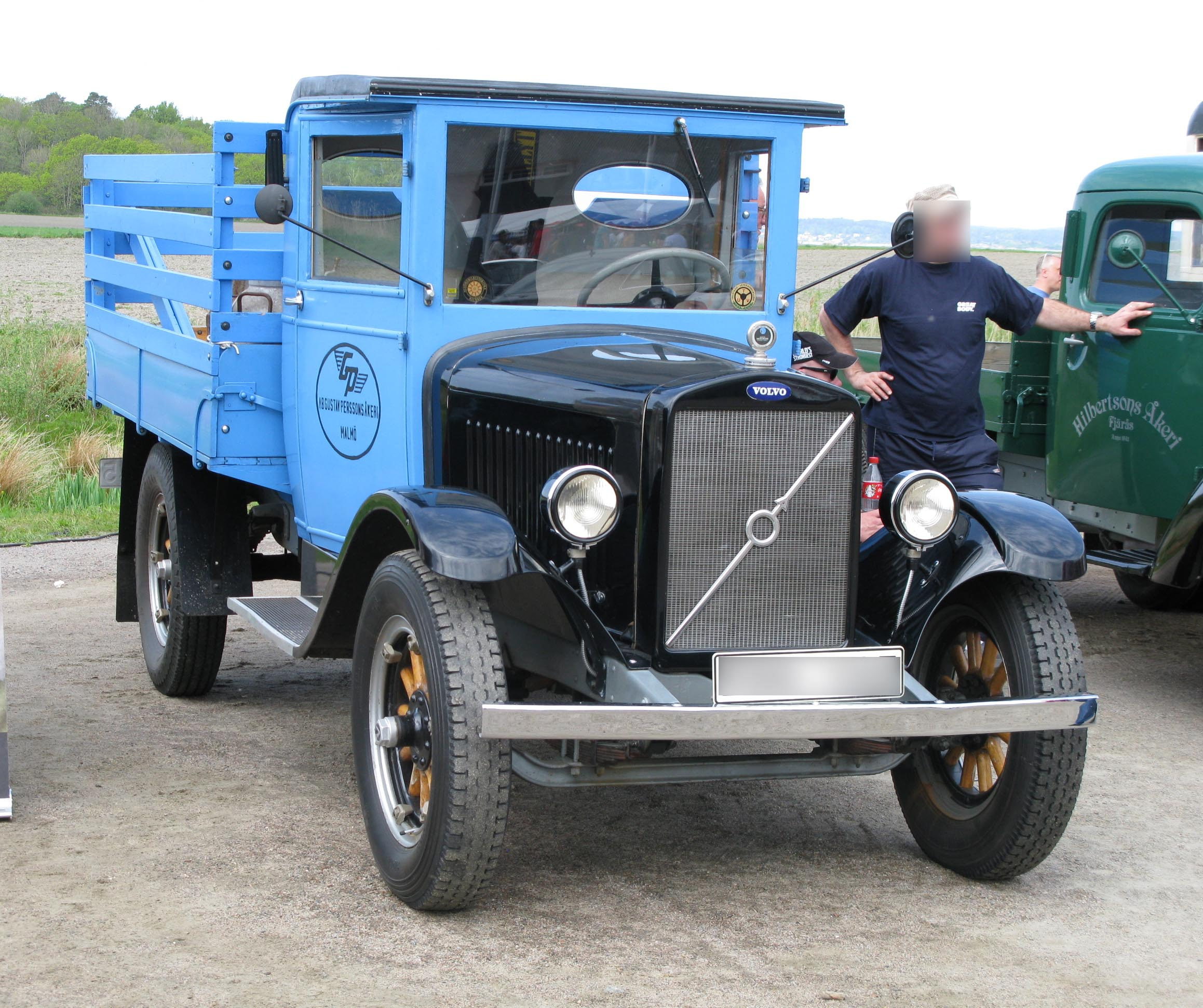
1930 Volvo LV60

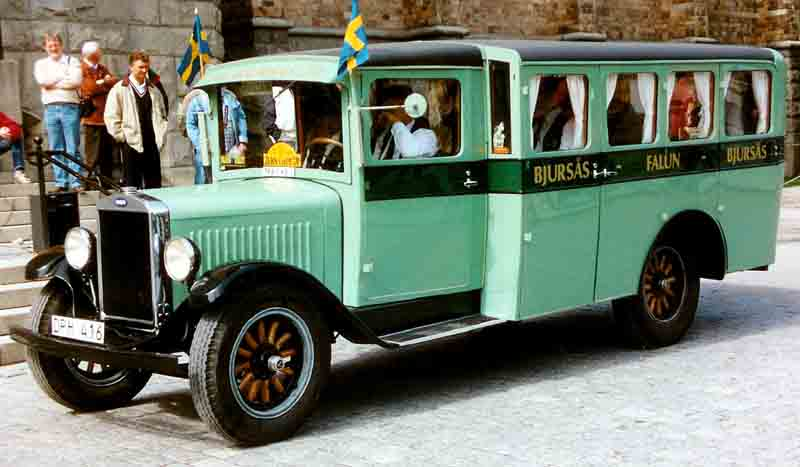
1930 Volvo LV61 bus
