= Volvo TR670 Series =

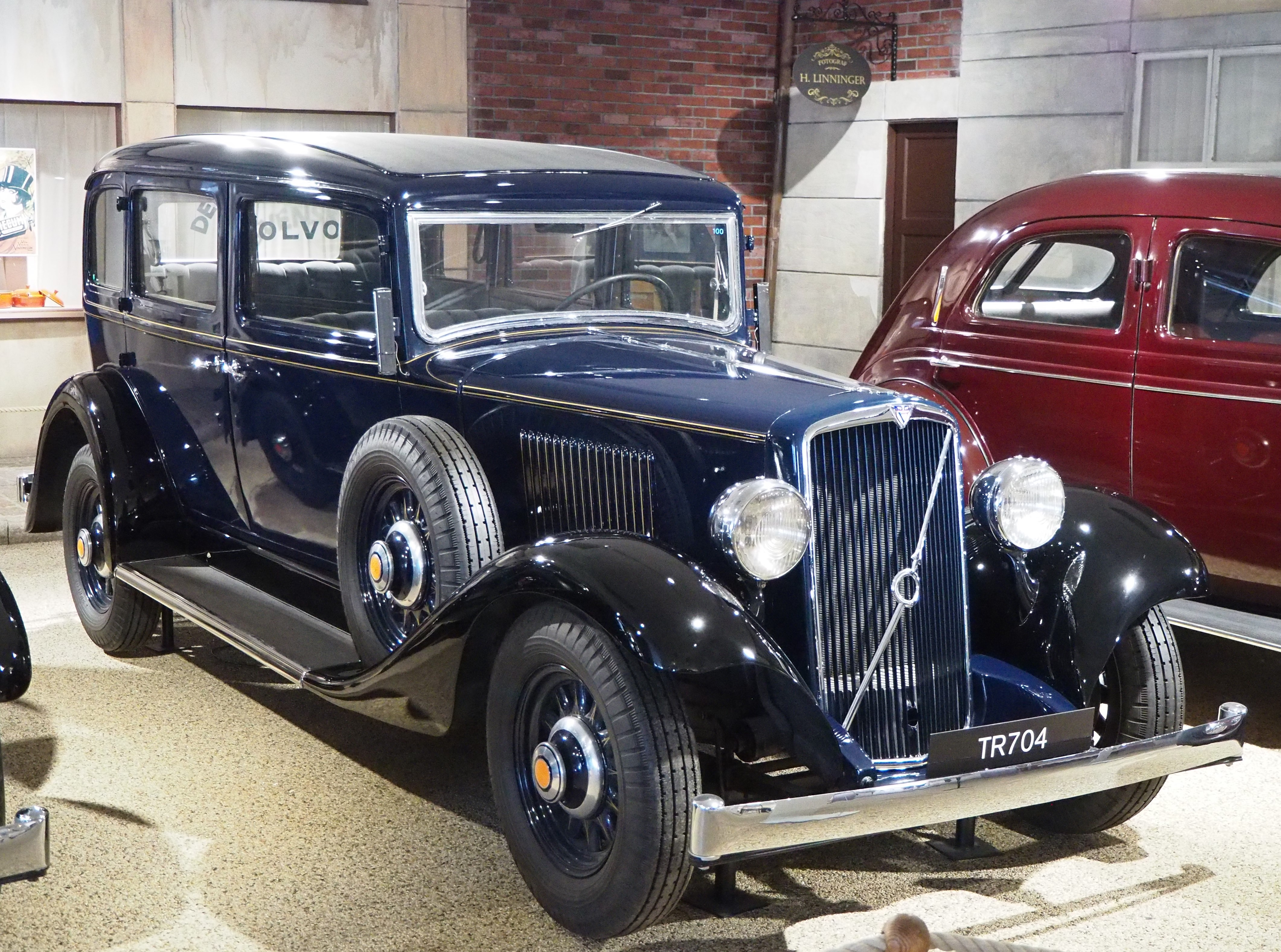
- Volvo TR704

Overview
- Manufacturer: Volvo Cars
- Production: 1930–1937
- Assembly: Sweden: Lundby, Gothenburg
- Designer: Gustaf Larson

Body and chassis
- Class: Taxicab
- Body style: 4-door saloon
- Layout: FR layout
- Related: Volvo PV650 Series

Powertrain
- Engine: Volvo sidevalve inline-6

Chronology
- Successor: Volvo PV800 Series

The Volvo TR670 Series is a taxicab manufactured by Volvo between 1930 and 1937. The model name stands for TRafikvagn ("taxicab"), 6 cylinders, 7 seats; the third digit indicates the version.

== TR670-674 ==
Volvo TR670-674

Overview
- Production: 1930–1934

Powertrain
- Engine: 3.0 L DB I6 (1930–1931); 3.4 L EB I6 (1932–1934)
- Transmission: 3-speed manual (1932–1934); 4-speed manual (1930–1931)

Dimensions
- Wheelbase: 3,100 mm (122.0 in)

With the introduction of the six-cylinder PV650 Series in 1929, Volvo had a car large and robust enough to be competitive on the lucrative taxicab market. The TR670 Series was introduced in February 1930. Volvo increased the wheelbase by 150 mm (to 3,100 mm), which turned the car into a seven seater with two foldable spare seats in the passenger compartment. The car was built in two versions: the TR S (Stad, “town”) had a glass partition between the driver and the passenger seats. This car also had a higher roof line, so that the gentlemen wouldn’t have to take off their top hats during the ride. The TR L (Landsort, “countryside”) lacked the partition and used the same roof line as the ordinary PV651. The model names were soon altered to TR671 and TR672, in line with the PV650/PV651/PV652 nomenclature. As with the PV650 Series, there were also commercial chassis versions of the car.

The cars where succeeded in the spring of 1931 by the TR673 and TR674. These new cars had longer and wider bodies, to increase the passenger space.

In January 1932 the taxicabs were updated with the larger capacity 3,366 cc EB engine and a new 3-speed gearbox with synchronized 2nd and 3rd gear.

=== Versions ===
Production data from Lindh, p. 234.

- TR670: 1930–1934, 88 cars built, commercial chassis
- TR671: 1930–1931, with glass partition
- TR672: 1930–1931, without glass partition
- TR673: 1931–1934, 233 cars built, with glass partition
- TR674: 1931–1934, 138 cars built, without glass partition

Total production of TR671/672: 200 cars

== TR676-679 ==
Volvo TR676-679

Overview
- Production: 1934–1935

Powertrain
- Engine: 3,366 cc (3.4 L) EB I6
- Transmission: 3-speed manual

Dimensions
- Wheelbase: 3,250 mm (128.0 in)

In April 1934 the taxicabs were updated with a new, stronger chassis with an X-shaped cross member support, smaller 17-inch rims and an all-steel body, without the wooden frame. The wheelbase was increased another 150 mm, except for the town car which kept the smaller wheelbase and the higher roof line.

=== Versions ===
- TR675: 1934, 2 cars built, commercial chassis on 3,100 mm wheelbase
- TR676: 1934–1935, 29 cars built, with glass partition and 3,100 mm wheelbase
- TR677: 1934, 2 cars built, commercial chassis
- TR678: 1934–1935, 39 cars built, with glass partition
- TR679: 1934, 114 cars built, without glass partition

== TR701-704 ==
Volvo TR701-704
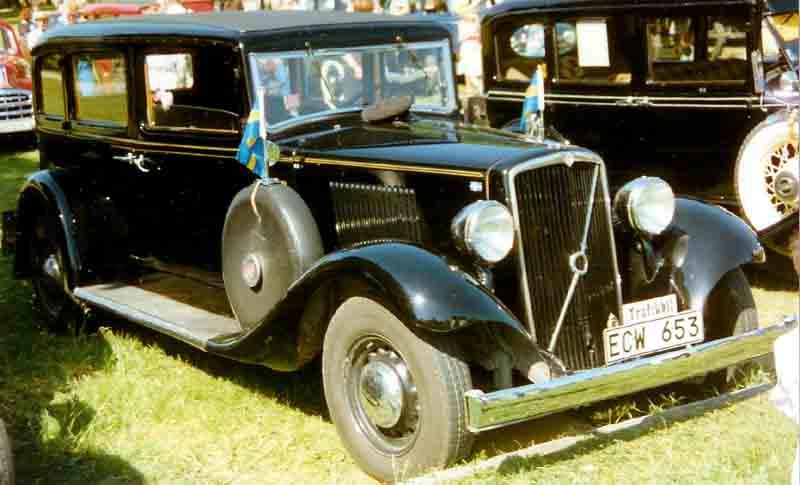
- 1937 Volvo TR704

Overview
- Production: 1935–1937

Powertrain
- Engine: 3,670 cc (3.7 L) EC I6
- Transmission: 3-speed manual

Dimensions
- Wheelbase: 3,250 mm (128.0 in)

In 1935 Volvo updated the taxicabs once more. The cars got the larger capacity 3670cc EC engine and a V-shaped radiator grille. The TR670 Series was superseded by the Volvo PV800 Series in 1937.

=== Versions ===
- TR701: 1935–1937, 214 cars built, with glass partition and 3,100 mm wheelbase
- TR702: 1935–1937, 11 cars built, commercial chassis
- TR703: 1935–1937, 181 cars built, with glass partition
- TR704: 1935–1937, 530 cars built, without glass partition
