= Volvo PV 60 =

Car model

Volvo PV60
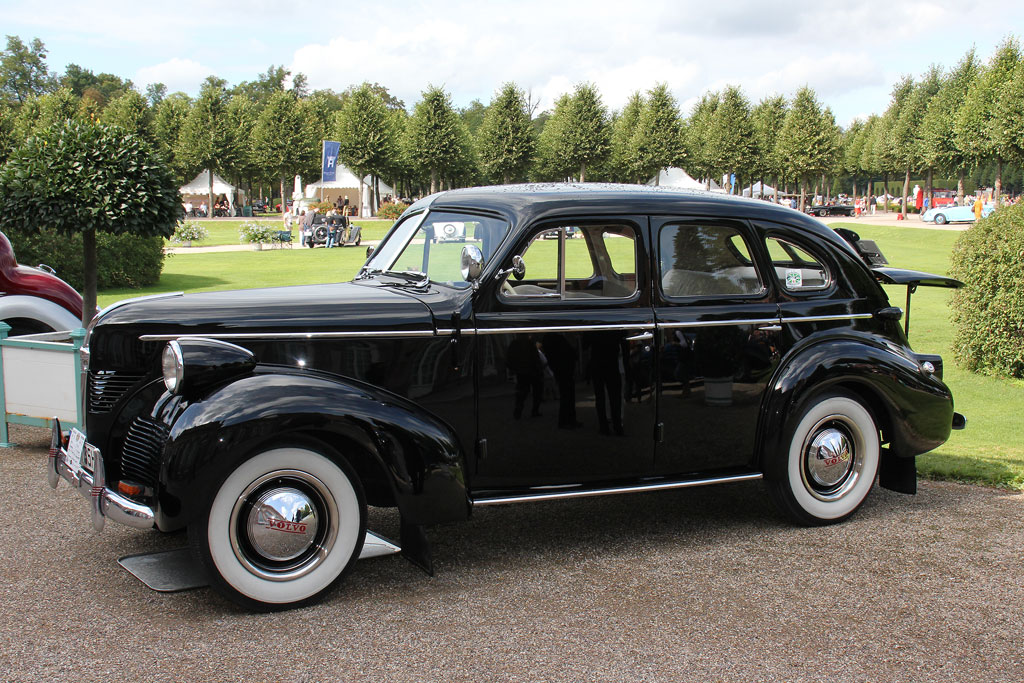

Overview
- Manufacturer: Volvo Cars
- Production: 1946–1950
- Assembly: Sweden: Lundby, Gothenburg
- Designer: Gustaf Larson

Body and chassis
- Class: Luxury car
- Body style: 4-door saloon
- Layout: FR layout

Powertrain
- Engine: 3,670 cc (3.7 L) ED I6
- Transmission: 3-speed manual with optional overdrive

Dimensions
- Wheelbase: 2,850 mm (112.2 in)
- Length: 4,725 mm (186.0 in)
- Width: 1,778 mm (70.0 in)
- Curb weight: 1,630 kg (3,594 lb)

Chronology
- Predecessor: Volvo PV51
- Successor: Volvo Disponent

The Volvo PV60 is an automobile manufactured by Volvo between 1946 and 1950. It was the first car produced by the Swedish company after the end of the Second World War.

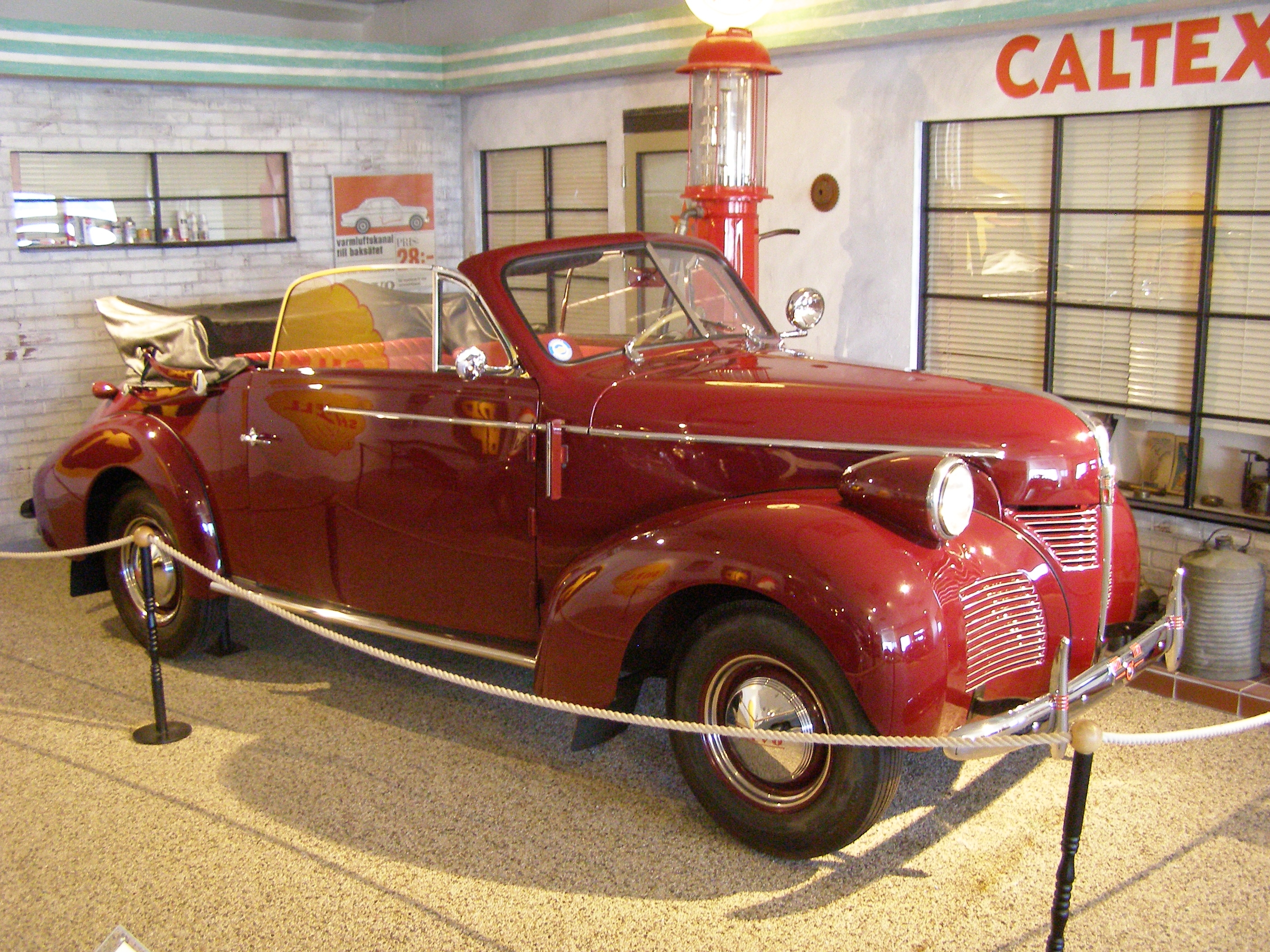
Volvo PV60 convertible

The development of the PV60 had started in 1939 and the car was introduced to the public alongside the smaller PV444 in September 1944. It was originally intended to be introduced in 1940, but it was delayed by the war. The large car was powered by a 3,670 cc (3.7 L; 224.0 cu in) inline 6 that produced 90 hp (67 kW). It was attached to a column-shifted three-speed manual transmission. The vehicle had a wheelbase of 2,850 mm (112.2 in) and a length of 4,725 mm (186.0 in).

While the sales brochure described it as "en linjeren vagn i europeisk stil" (a clean line coach in European style), it bore a strong resemblance to a 1939 Pontiac, with the front being almost impossible to tell from the original. However, the Volvo was 10 cm shorter than the smallest Pontiac.

Production did not start until December 1946, and the majority of the cars were built in 1949 and 1950. In total, there were 3506 PV60s produced, about 500 of which were built into trucks or vans as PV 61.

The smaller PV444 was more suited for the post-war economy and production of the PV60 halted in 1950. From that point on, the largest model in Volvo's range and the one most similar in size to the PV 60 was the Volvo PV800 Series taxi, which in 1950 would see a version intended for personal use, the Disponent, started being built. It would take almost two decades until Volvo introduced another upmarket six-cylinder car, the 164.
