= Volvo PV51 =

Volvo PV51-PV56
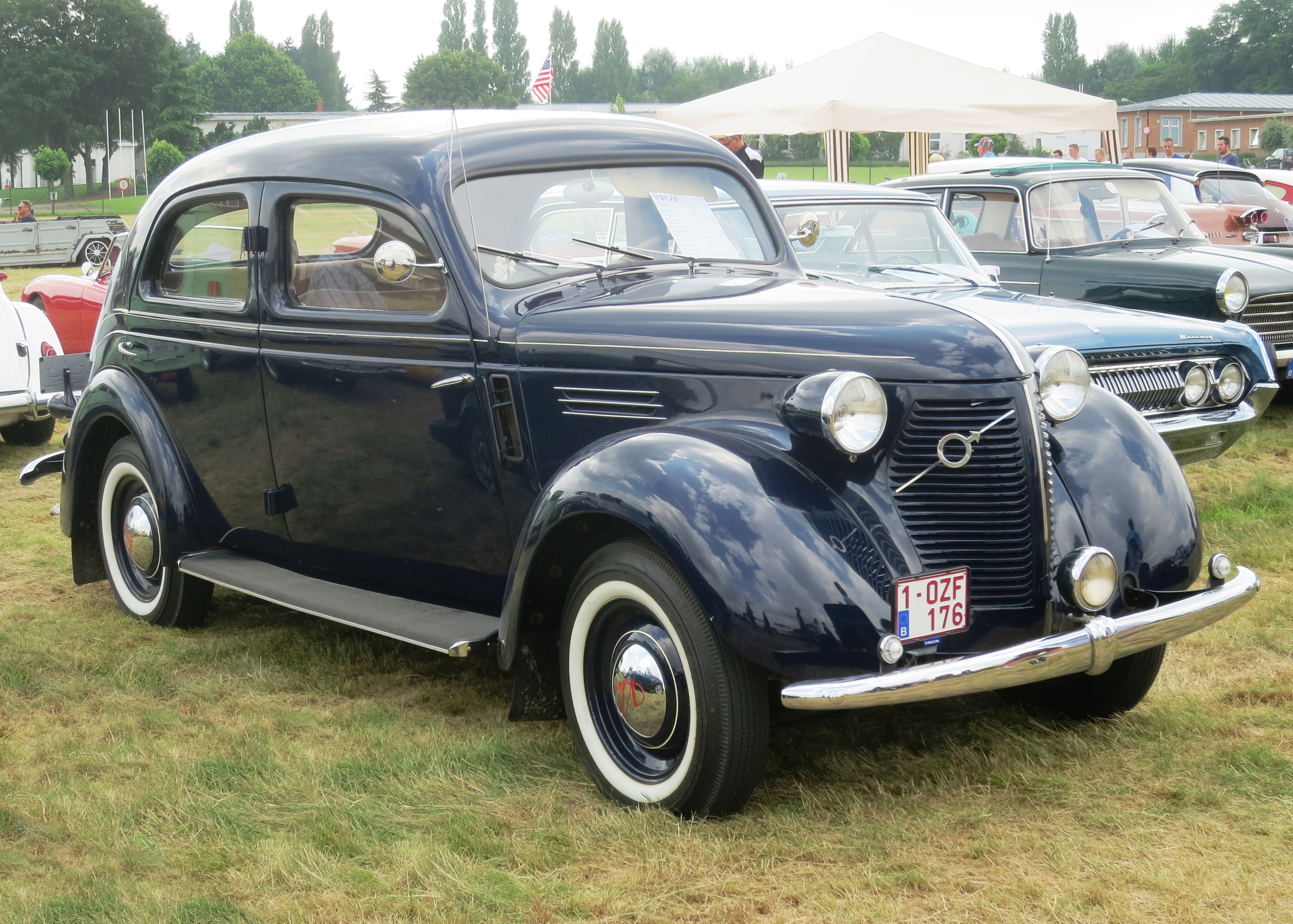
- 1939 Volvo PV54

Overview
- Manufacturer: Volvo Cars
- Production: 1936–1945
- Assembly: Sweden: Lundby, Gothenburg

Body and chassis
- Class: saloon
- Body style: 4-door saloon
- Layout: FR layout

Powertrain
- Engine: 3,670 cc (3.7 L) EC I6
- Transmission: 3-speed manual with optional overdrive

Dimensions
- Wheelbase: 2,880 mm (113.4 in)
- Curb weight: 1,540 kg (3,395 lb)

Chronology
- Predecessor: Volvo PV 36; Volvo PV650 Series
- Successor: Volvo PV 60

The Volvo PV51 is a car introduced by Volvo in December 1936. It was replaced by the mildly restyled PV53 in 1938. This car remained in production until the end of the Second World War.

== PV51-52 ==
The Volvo cars were quite expensive compared to their imported competitors. The PV51 was the answer to a request from Volvo’s dealers to offer a smaller and less expensive model. The rear end of the body was similar to the Carioca, but the front was new and the interior was simplified, to cut the price. The PV51 had to make do with a live front axle.

In early 1937 the de luxe model PV52 was introduced. The equipment list included twin sun visors, twin windscreen wipers, a watch, a heater and armrests on all four doors.

In March 1938 the PV51 Special and the PV52 Special were introduced. On these cars the spare wheel was moved from the bootlid to the boot floor. The cars had an expanded boot to increase the luggage space.

=== Versions ===
- PV51: 1936–1938, 1754 cars built, base model
- PV52: 1937–1938, 1046 cars built, de luxe model
- PV51 ch: 1936–1938, 205 cars built, commercial chassis

== PV53-56 ==
In the autumn of 1938 the PV51-52 was replaced by the PV53-56. These cars had a new front end with a wedge-shaped grille, modified suspension and steering, uprated interior and dashboard. The types 53 and 55 received a cover with a spare wheel pressing rather than the full boot and floor mounted spare of the PV54 and 56 (and PV51/52 Special).

After the outbreak of the Second World War production continued, mainly to provide transportation to the Swedish Armed Forces and for other official functions. Most of these war time cars had a wood gas generator mounted on a trailer behind the car, since the engine had been converted to run on this domestically sourced fuel. Thus equipped, power output dropped to around 50 PS (37 kW).

=== Versions ===
- PV53: 1938–1945, 1204 cars built, base model
- PV54: 1938–1945, 814 cars built, base model with larger boot
- PV55: 1938–1945, 286 cars built, de luxe model
- PV56: 1938–1945, 1321 cars built, de luxe model with larger boot
- PV57: 1938–1945, 275 cars built, commercial chassis

== Gallery ==
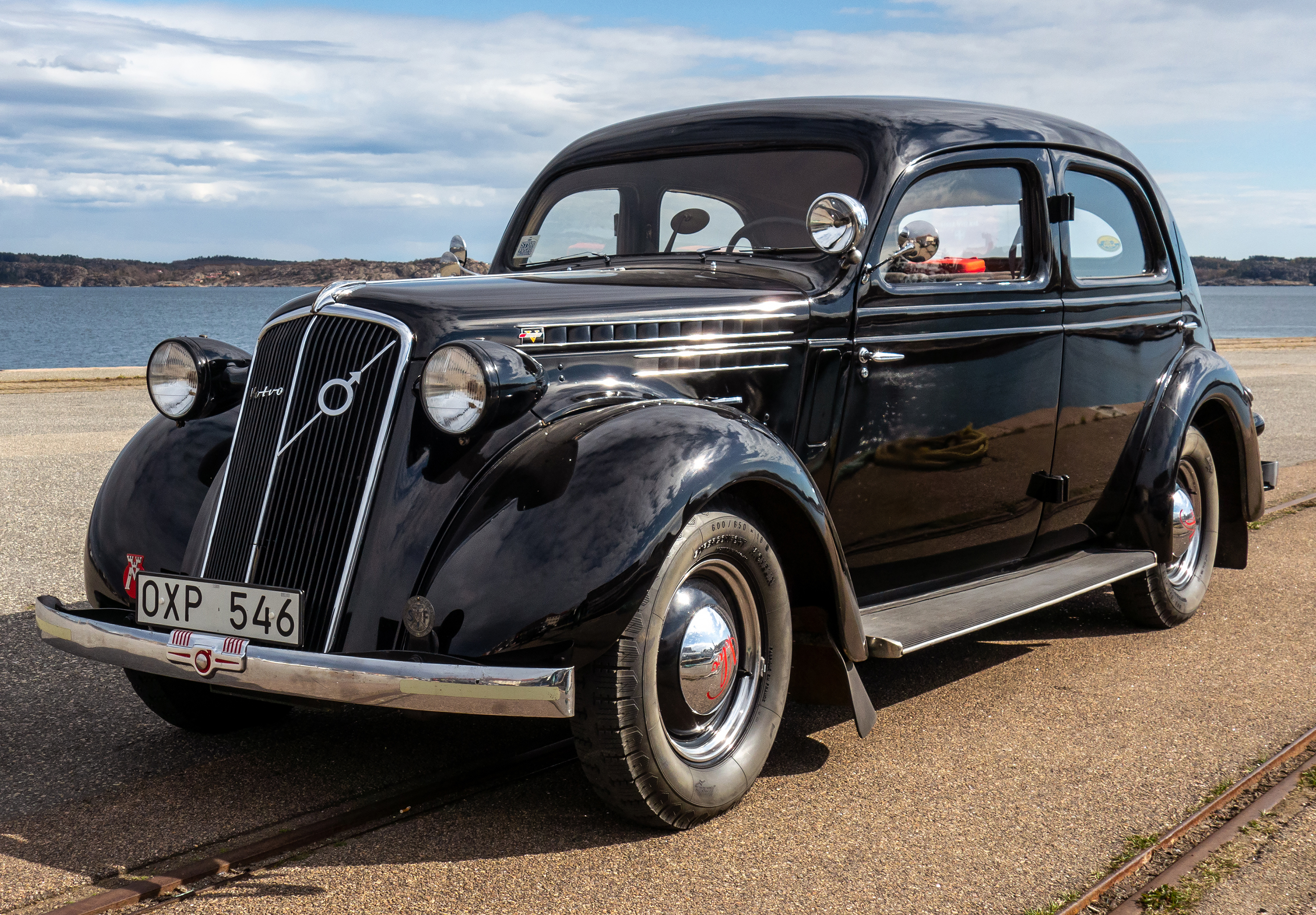
1937 Volvo PV51

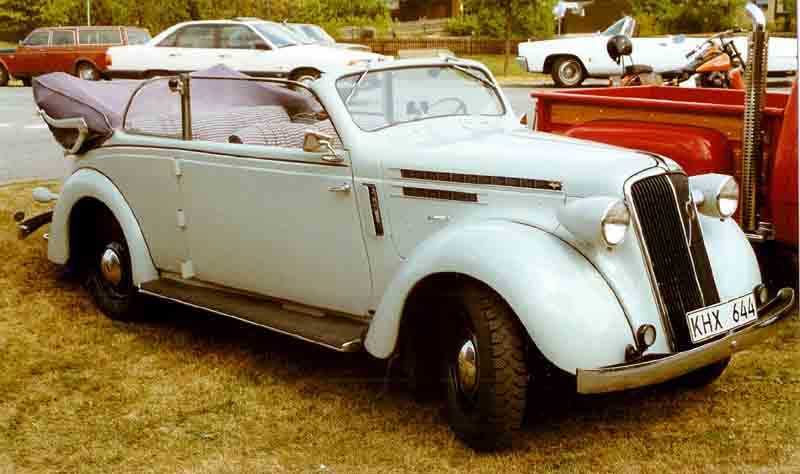
1937 Volvo PV51 Cabriolet

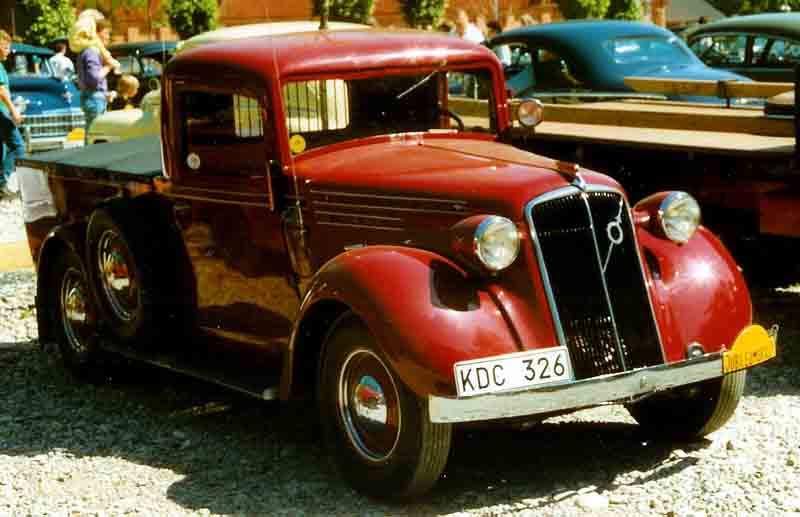
1938 Volvo PV51 TV Pickup

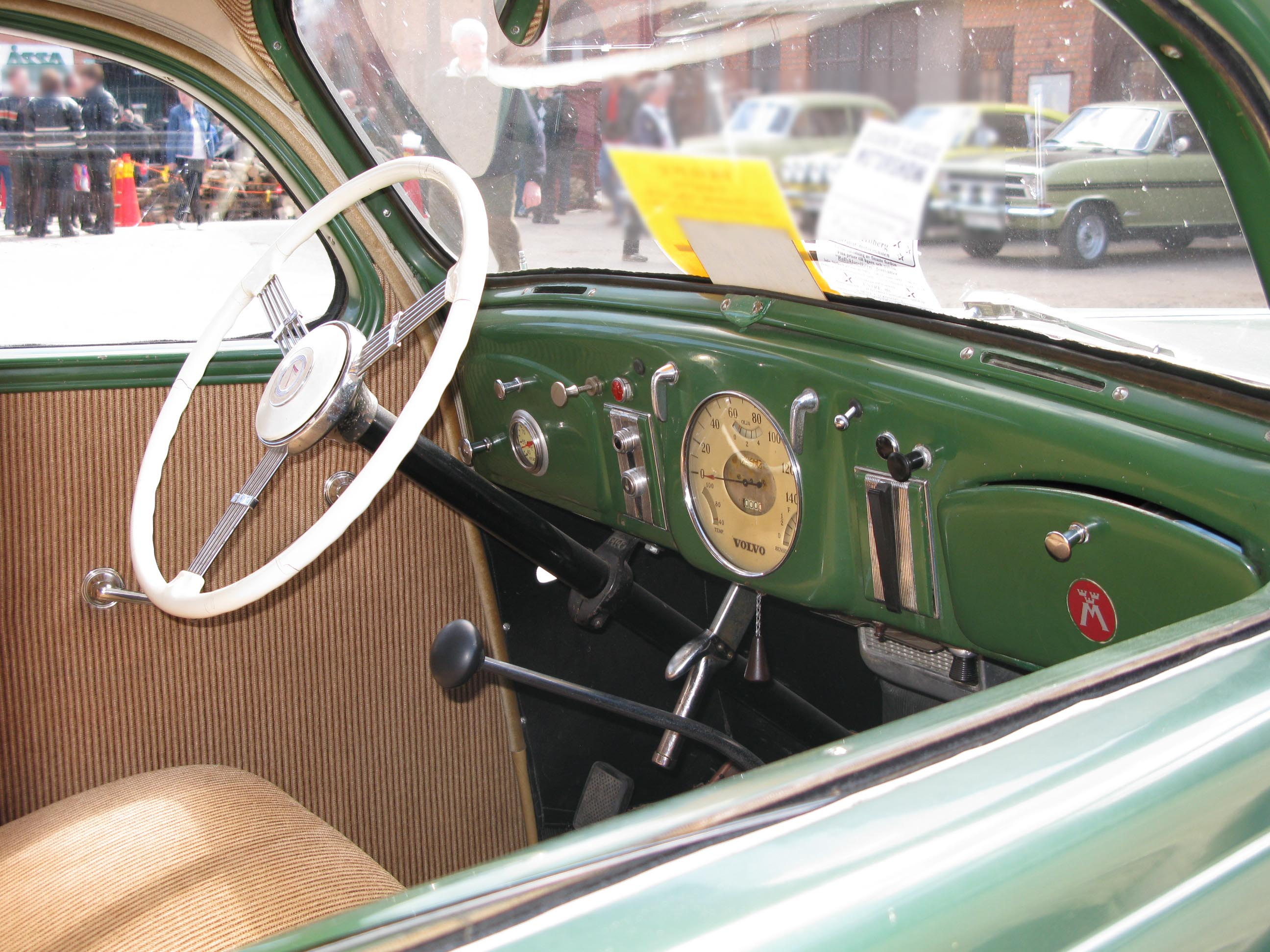
Volvo PV52 interior

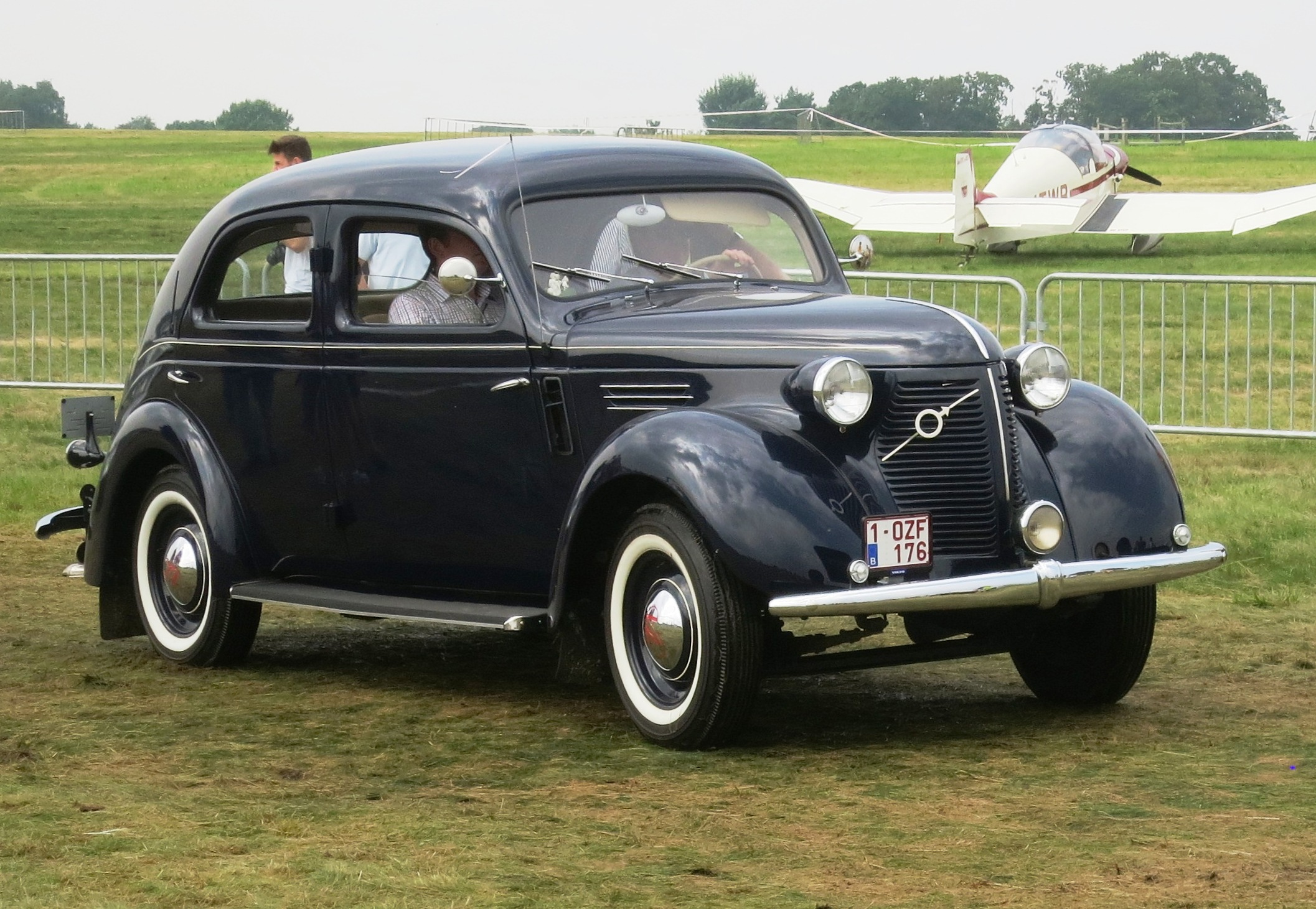
1939 Volvo PV54

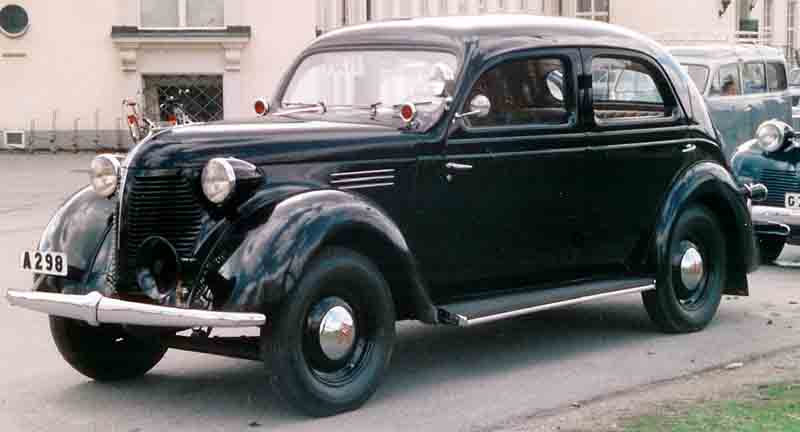
1939 Volvo PV56
