= Volvo PV650 Series =

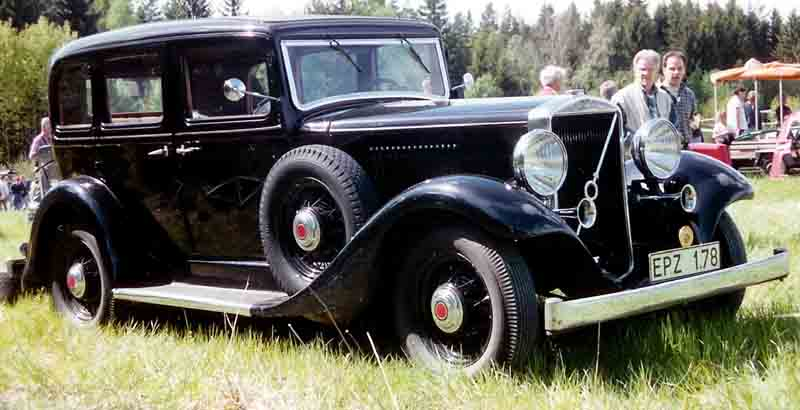
- 1933 Volvo PV654

Overview
- Manufacturer: Volvo Cars
- Production: 1929–1937
- Assembly: Sweden: Lundby, Gothenburg
- Designer: Gustaf Larson

Body and chassis
- Class: Saloon
- Body style: 4d Saloon
- Layout: FR layout
- Related: Volvo TR670 Series

Powertrain
- Engine: Volvo sidevalve inline 6

Dimensions
- Wheelbase: 2,950 mm (116.1 in)

Chronology
- Predecessor: Volvo PV4
- Successor: Volvo PV51

The Volvo PV650 Series is an automobile manufactured by Volvo between 1929 and 1937. The model name stand for PersonVagn ("passenger car"), 6 cylinders, 5 seats; the third digit indicates the version.

== PV650-652 ==
Volvo PV650-PV652
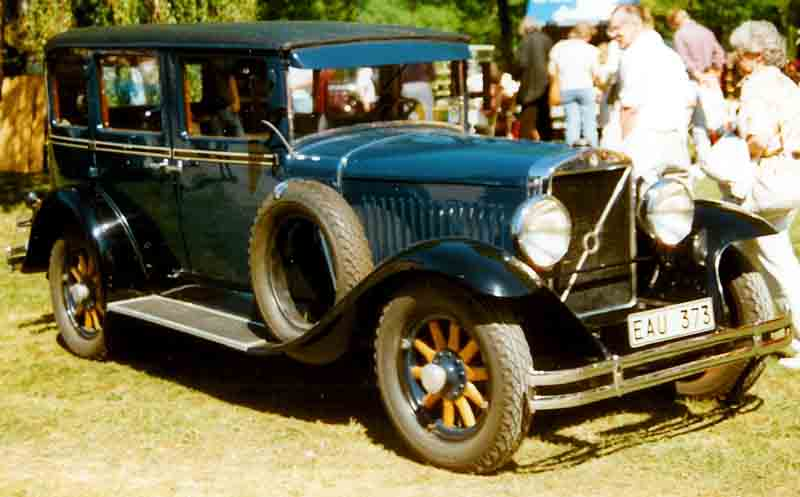
- 1929 Volvo PV651 Sedan

Overview
- Production: 1929–1933

Powertrain
- Engine: 3.0 L DB I6 (1929–1931); 3.4 L EB I6 (1932–1933)
- Transmission: 3-speed manual (1929–1930, 1932–1933); 4-speed manual (1931)

Volvo had started planning for a larger successor for its first car, the ÖV4 in 1926, even before the little four-cylinder car was introduced. The Swedish car market was dominated by American manufacturers and Volvo needed a large six-cylinder car to be competitive.

Volvo PV651 was introduced in April 1929. The new car had a stronger chassis to cope with the more powerful engine. The bodywork was manufactured in the traditional way, with a wooden frame covered with steel plates. The 3010 cc DB engine was very robust and its crankshaft was supported by seven main bearings. The gearbox was a non-synchromesh 3-speed box.

In the spring of 1930 the car was succeeded by the PV652, with modified interior and dashboard. The engine had a new carburettor but the main improvement was the introduction of hydraulic brakes. In 1931 the car got a 4-speed non-synchromesh gearbox. In January 1932 the PV652 was updated with the larger capacity 3366 cc EB engine and a new 3-speed gearbox with synchronized 2nd and 3rd gear.

Volvo also built commercial chassis versions of the car. Most of them got light truck-, ambulance or hearse bodies, but a small number of the PV650 Series chassises were clothed in more flamboyant two-door open or closed bodies.

=== Versions ===
- PV650: 1929–1933, 206 cars built, commercial chassis
- PV651: 1929–1930, mechanical brakes
- PV652: 1930–1933, hydraulic brakes

Total production of PV651/652: 2,176 cars

== PV653-655 ==
Volvo PV653-PV655
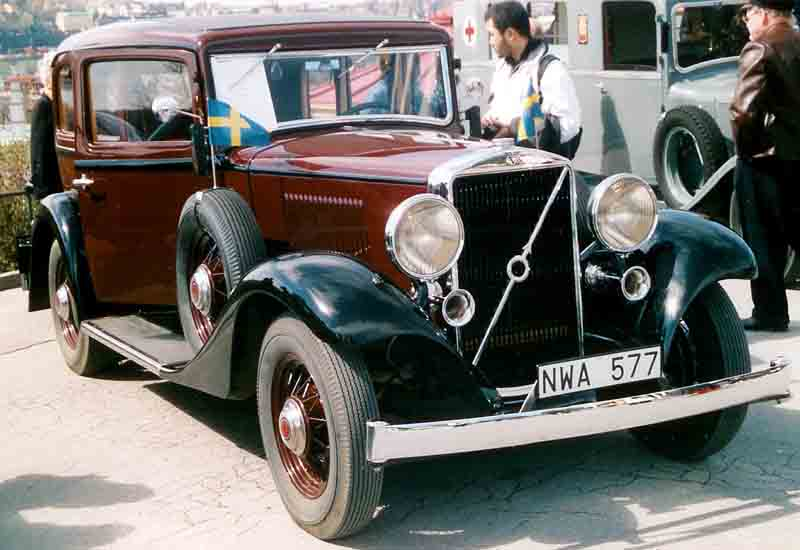
- 1933 Volvo PV654 Sedan

Overview
- Production: 1933–1935

Powertrain
- Engine: 3,366 cc (3.4 L) EB I6
- Transmission: 3-speed manual

In the autumn of 1933 the six-cylinder Volvo cars were updated with a new, stronger chassis with an X-shaped cross member support, smaller 17-inch rims and an all-steel body, without the wooden frame. The centre roof section was still covered with a leatherette insertion. The body had new fenders and the windshield and radiator grille were slightly tilted to improve the aerodynamics. The mechanical parts were left unchanged.

Volvo offered two versions: the PV653 base model and the PV654 de luxe model. The PV654 luxury equipment included an uprated interior, twin fender mounted spare tires, twin chrome plated horns and twin rear lights.

=== Versions ===
- PV653: 1933–1934, 230 cars built, base model
- PV654: 1933–1934, 361 cars built, de luxe model
- PV655: 1933–1935, 62 cars built, commercial chassis

== PV656-659 ==
Volvo PV656-PV659
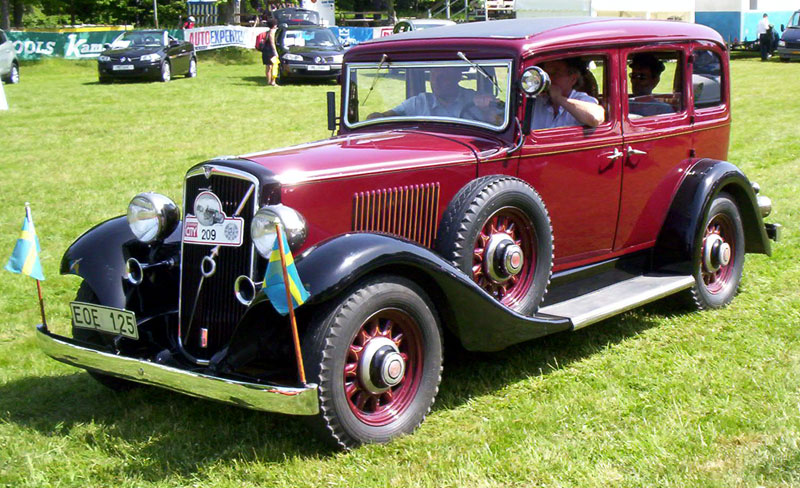
- 1935 Volvo PV659 Sedan

Overview
- Production: 1935–1937

Powertrain
- Engine: 3,670 cc (3.7 L) EC I6
- Transmission: 3-speed manual

By 1935 the PV650 Series design looked quite old fashioned. The body was basically the same as in 1929. Still, Volvo updated the cars once more. The new PV658/PV659 got the larger capacity 3670 cc EC engine and a V-shaped radiator grille.

The passenger cars were superseded by the Volvo PV51 in 1936, while the commercial chassis version soldiered on for one more year.

=== Versions ===
- PV656: 1935–1936, 16 cars built, commercial chassis
- PV657: 1935–1937, 55 cars built, commercial chassis with 3,550 mm (139.8 in) wheelbase
- PV658: 1935–1936, 301 cars built, base model
- PV659: 1935–1936, 170 cars built, de luxe model

== Gallery ==
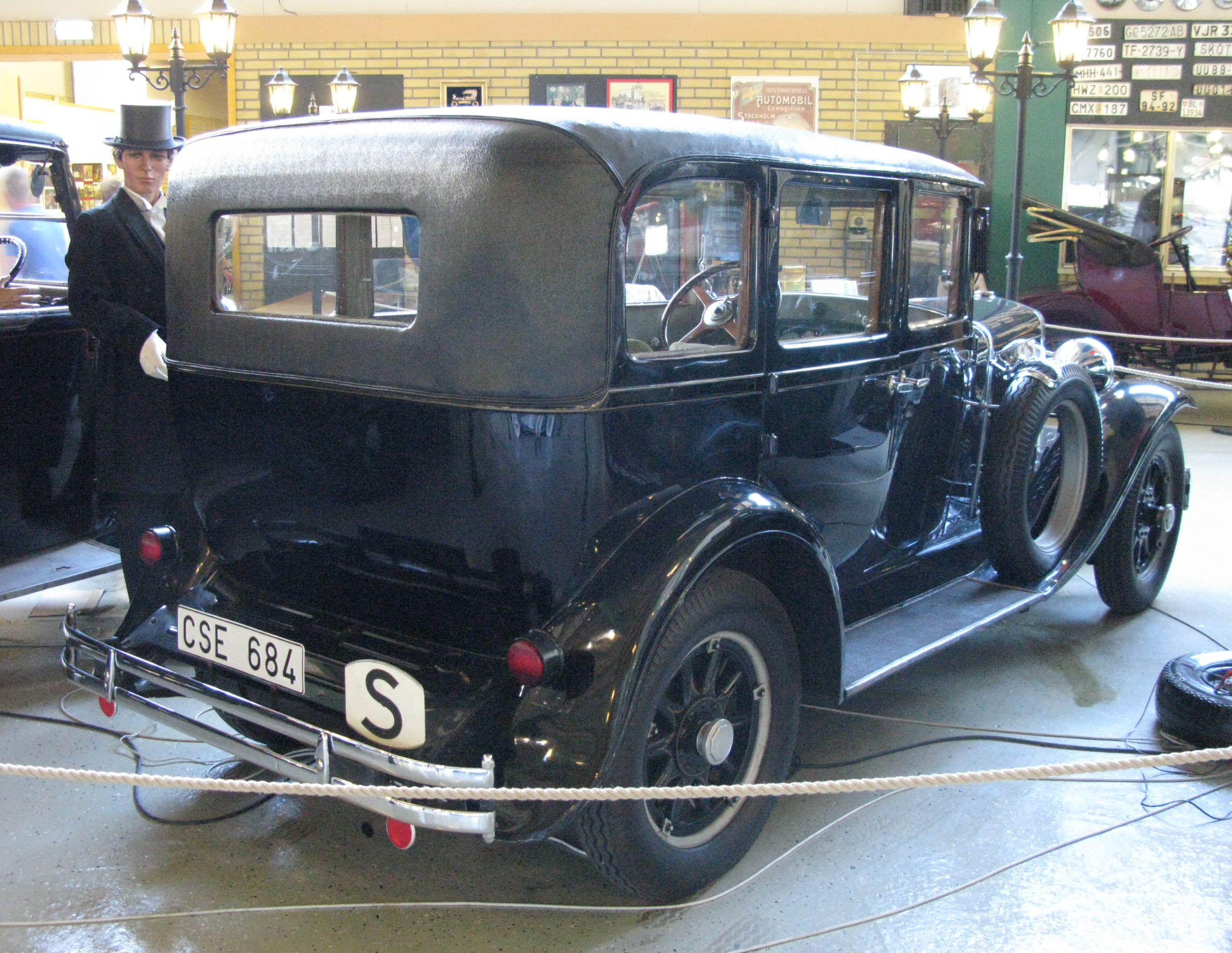
Rear view of 1931 Volvo 652 Sedan

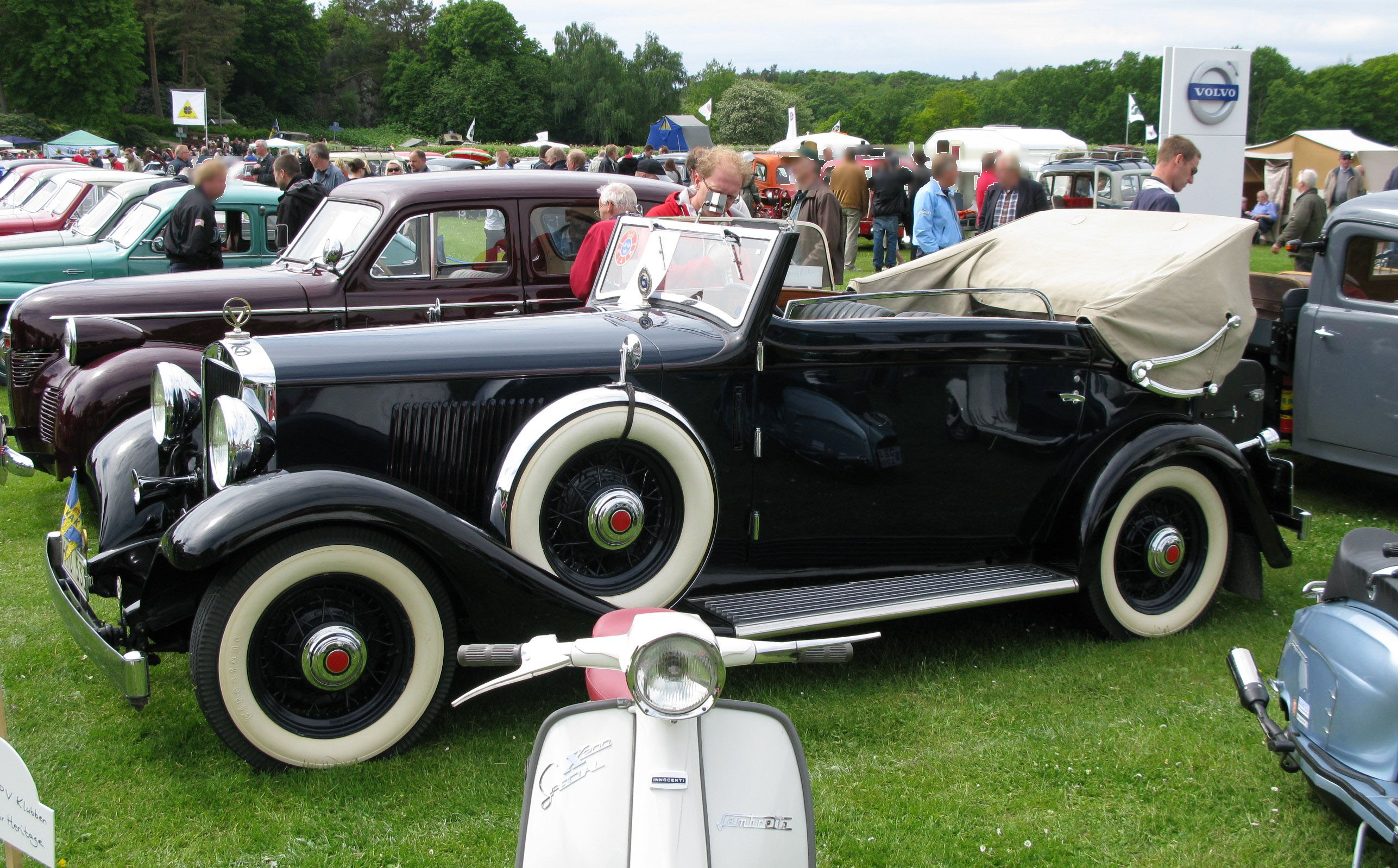
1933 Volvo PV655, one-off convertible body by Swedish coachbuilder Norrmalm

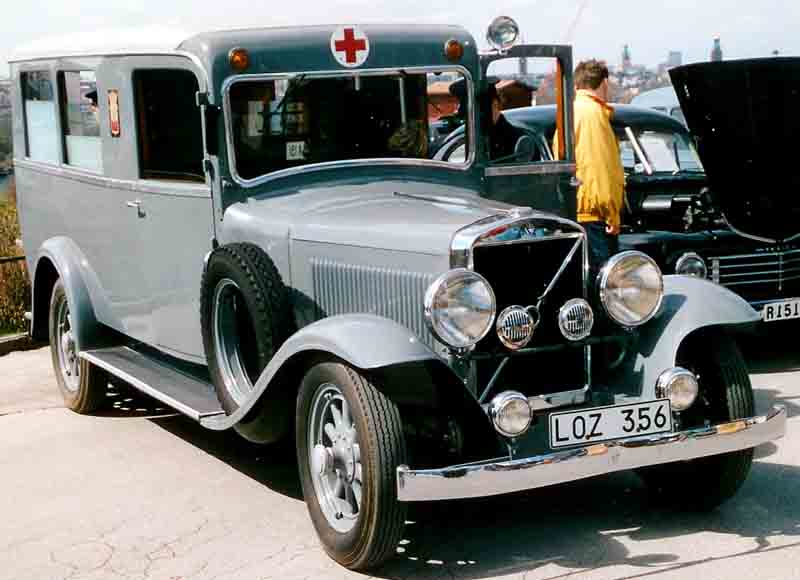
1934 Volvo PV655 Ambulance

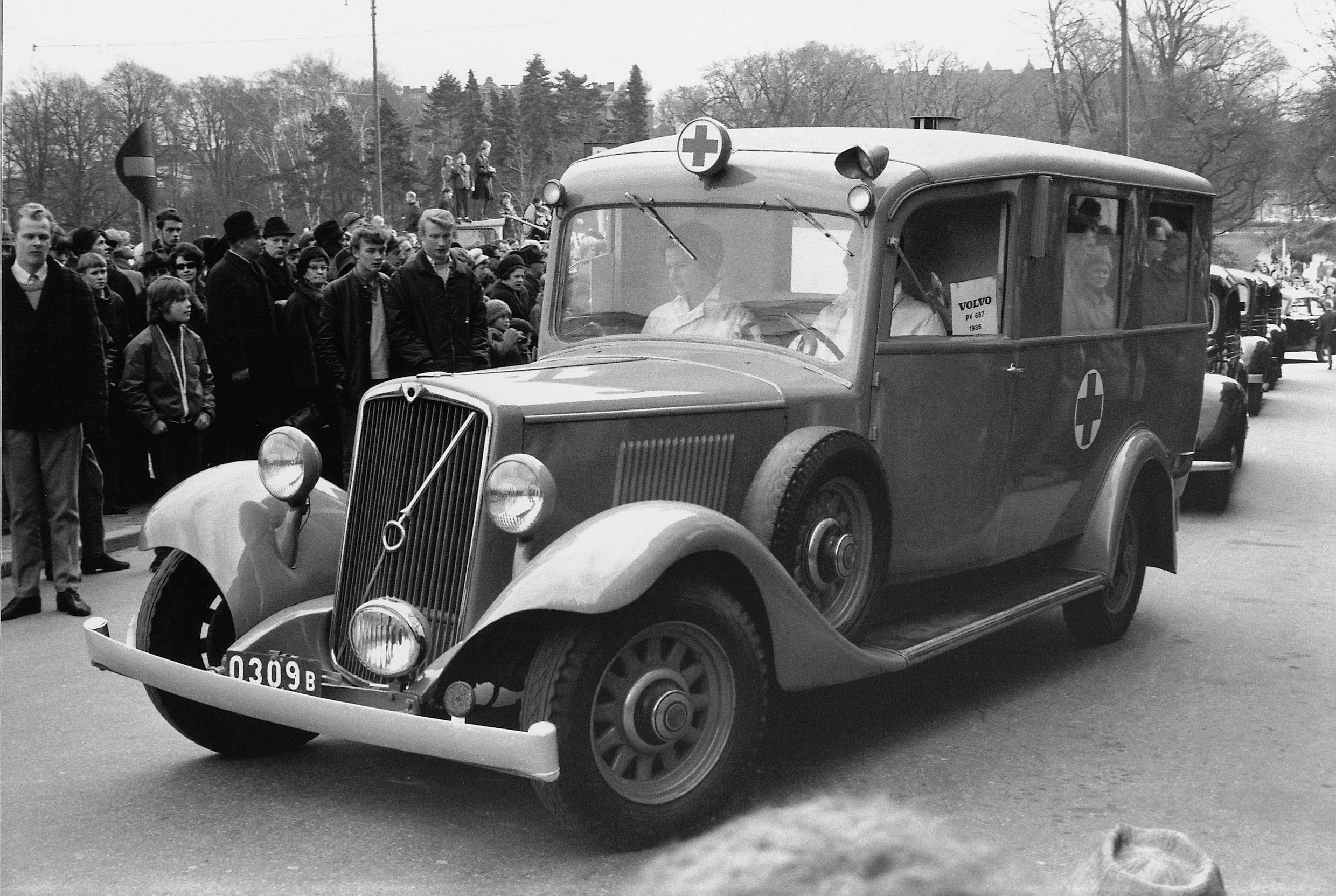
1937 Volvo PV657 Ambulance
