= Volvo PV800 Series =

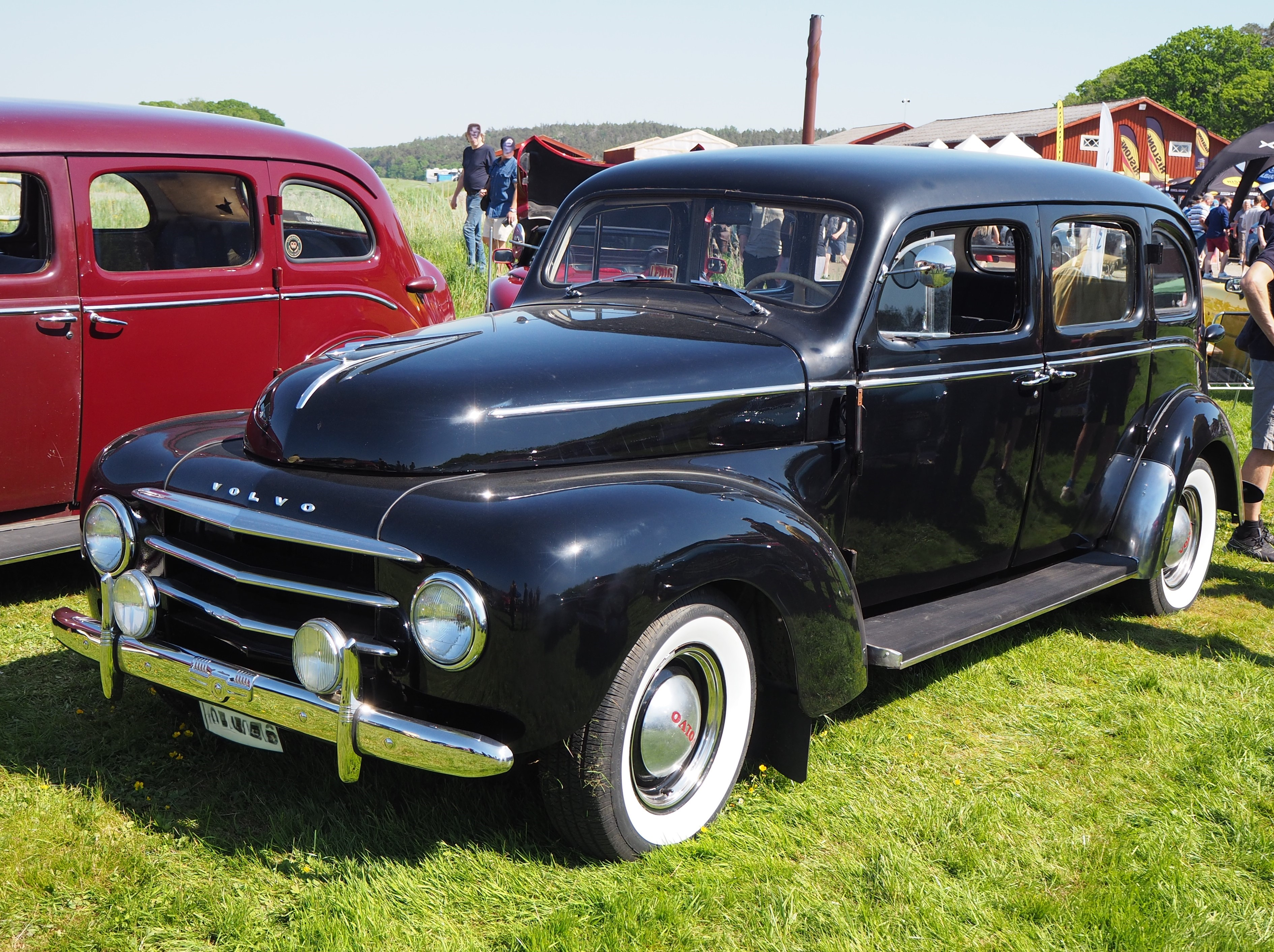

Overview
- Manufacturer: Volvo Cars
- Production: 1938–1958
- Assembly: Sweden: Lundby, Gothenburg

Body and chassis
- Class: Taxicab
- Body style: 4-door saloon
- Layout: FR layout

Powertrain
- Engine: 3,670 cc (3.7 L) EC/ED I6
- Transmission: 3-speed manual

Dimensions
- Wheelbase: 3,250 mm (128.0 in)

Chronology
- Predecessor: Volvo TR670 Series; Volvo PV 60
- Successor: Volvo 164

The Volvo PV800 Series (nicknamed the Volvo Sugga, literally the Sow) is a taxicab manufactured by Volvo from 1938 until 1958. The Sow series dominated the Swedish taxicab market during the 1940s and 1950s.

During World War II and in the 1950s, Volvo built a four-wheel drive off-road vehicle for the Swedish Armed Forces and Belgian Armed Forces, using the mechanical parts from Volvo’s small trucks, combined with much of the body from the PV-800 series Sow.

== PV800-810 ==
Volvo PV800-PV810
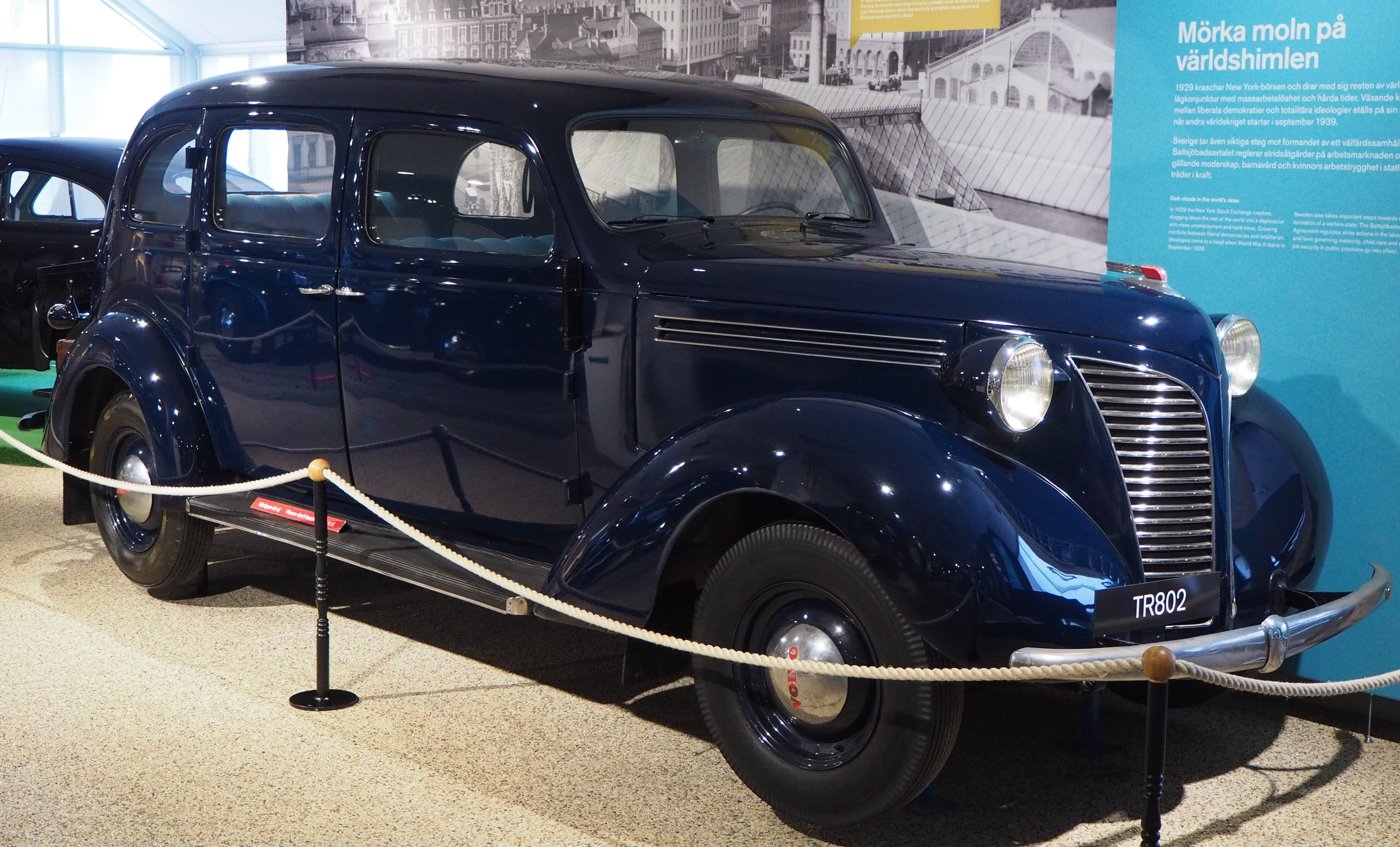

Overview
- Also called: TPV
- Production: 1938–1947

Body and chassis
- Related: Volvo Sharpnose

Powertrain
- Engine: 3.6L EC I6

The PV801 (with a glass division between the front and rear seat) and the PV802 (without the glass division) were introduced in 1938 and superseded the TR670 Series. The chassis and body were all new but the side-valve engine was the same as in the older cars. The front end was also used on Volvo’s smallest lorry, the LV100 Series.

The PV802 could be used as a spare ambulance. After folding all seats on the car’s right side, a stretcher could be loaded through the bootlid. Volvo continued to build commercial chassis versions, which were often used as basis for proper ambulances.

During the Second World War Volvo built a four-wheel drive off-road vehicle, called Terrängpersonvagn m/43 (TPV), for the Swedish Armed Forces and Belgian Armed Forces. The mechanical parts were based on Volvo’s smaller lorries and the body came from the Sow.

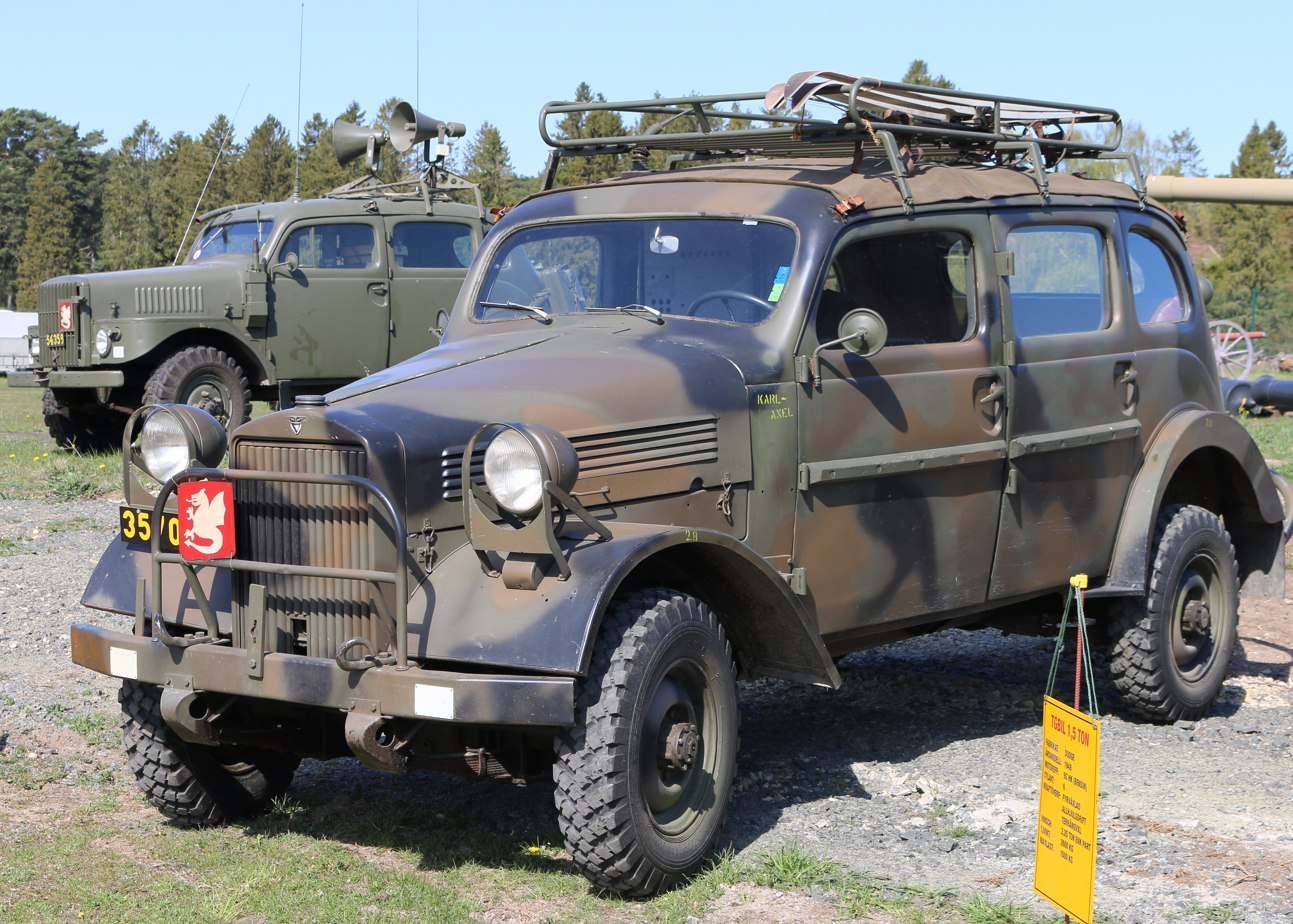
Volvo TerrängPersonVagn m/43 (TPV)

=== Versions ===
- PV800: 1940–1947, 37 cars built, commercial chassis
- PV801: 1938–1947, 550 cars built, with glass partition
- PV802: 1938–1947, 1081 cars built, without glass partition
- PV810: 1938–1947, 180 cars built, commercial chassis on 3,550 mm (139.8 in) wheelbase
- TPV: 1944–1946, 210 cars built, military off-road vehicle

== PV821-824 ==
Volvo PV821-PV824

Overview
- Production: 1947–1948

Powertrain
- Engine: 3.6L ED I6
- Transmission: 3-speed column shift manual

In 1947 the PV800 was succeeded by PV821 and PV822. The cars were updated with the slightly stronger ED engine and the column-mounted gear lever from the PV 60.

=== Versions ===
- PV821: 1948, 200 cars built, with glass partition
- PV822: 1947–1948, 300 cars built, without glass partition
- PV823: 1947–1948, 150 cars built, commercial chassis
- PV824: 1947–1948, 150 cars built, commercial chassis on 3,550 mm (139.8 in) wheelbase

== PV831-834 ==
Volvo PV831-PV834
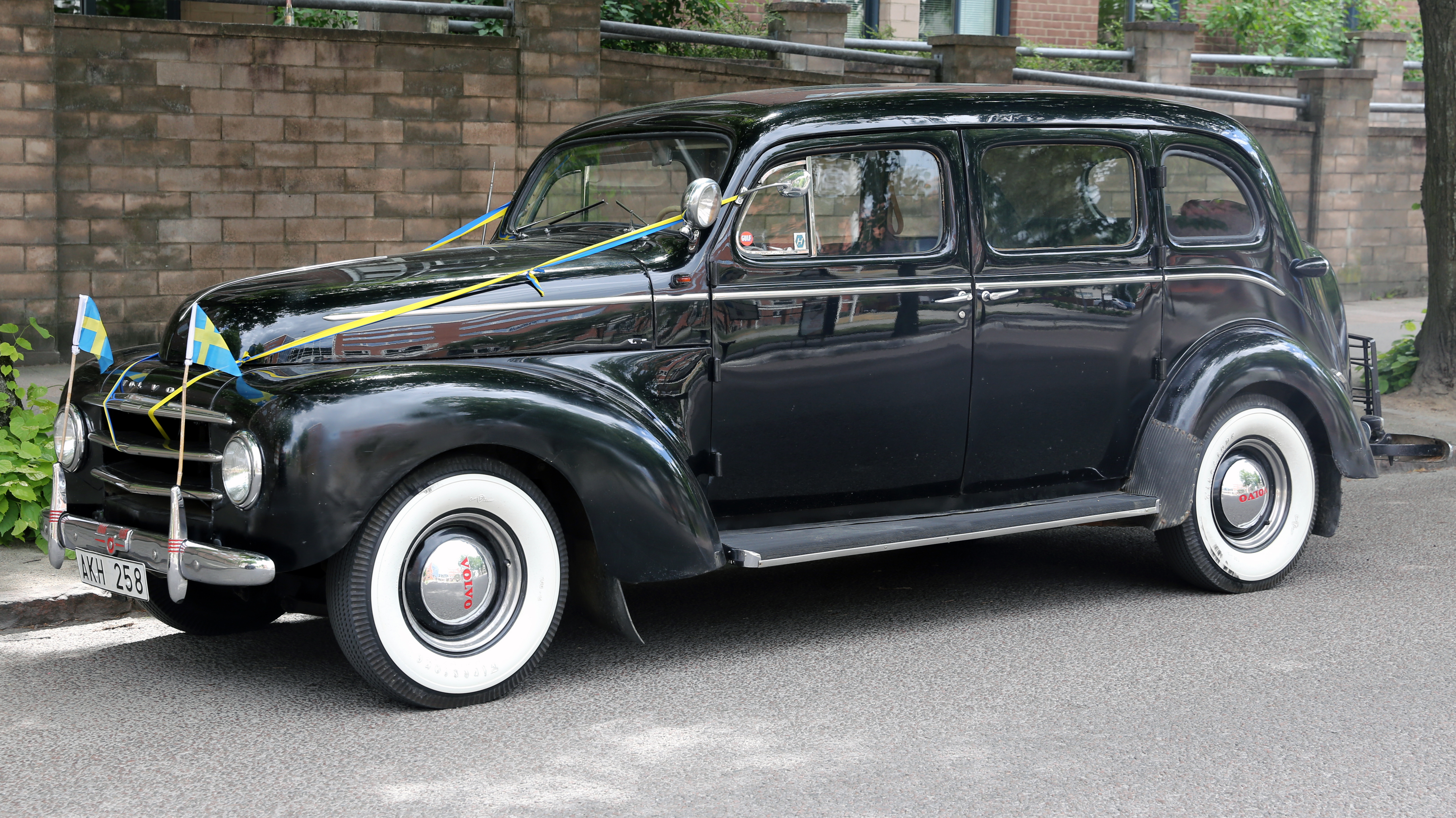

Overview
- Production: 1950–1958

Body and chassis
- Related: Volvo L340

Powertrain
- Engine: 3.6L ED
- Transmission: Volvo E9

In the autumn of 1950 the model returned with a new front, similar to the front of the PV444 and the small lorry L340. The cars were renamed PV831 and PV832, respectively. In 1953 independent front suspension became optional. That same year, a civilian executive version, Disponent, saw the light of day.

By the end of the 1950s the Sow was quite outdated. Volvo planned for a successor, project P358, which was to be a large car powered by a V8, but that car never materialized, so when production of the PV800 Series ended in 1958 Volvo left the taxi market unattended. The recently introduced P120 Amazon was too small to serve as a taxicab and there were almost ten years before Volvo presented a new car, suitable for taxi use, the 144.

== TP21 ==
Volvo TP21
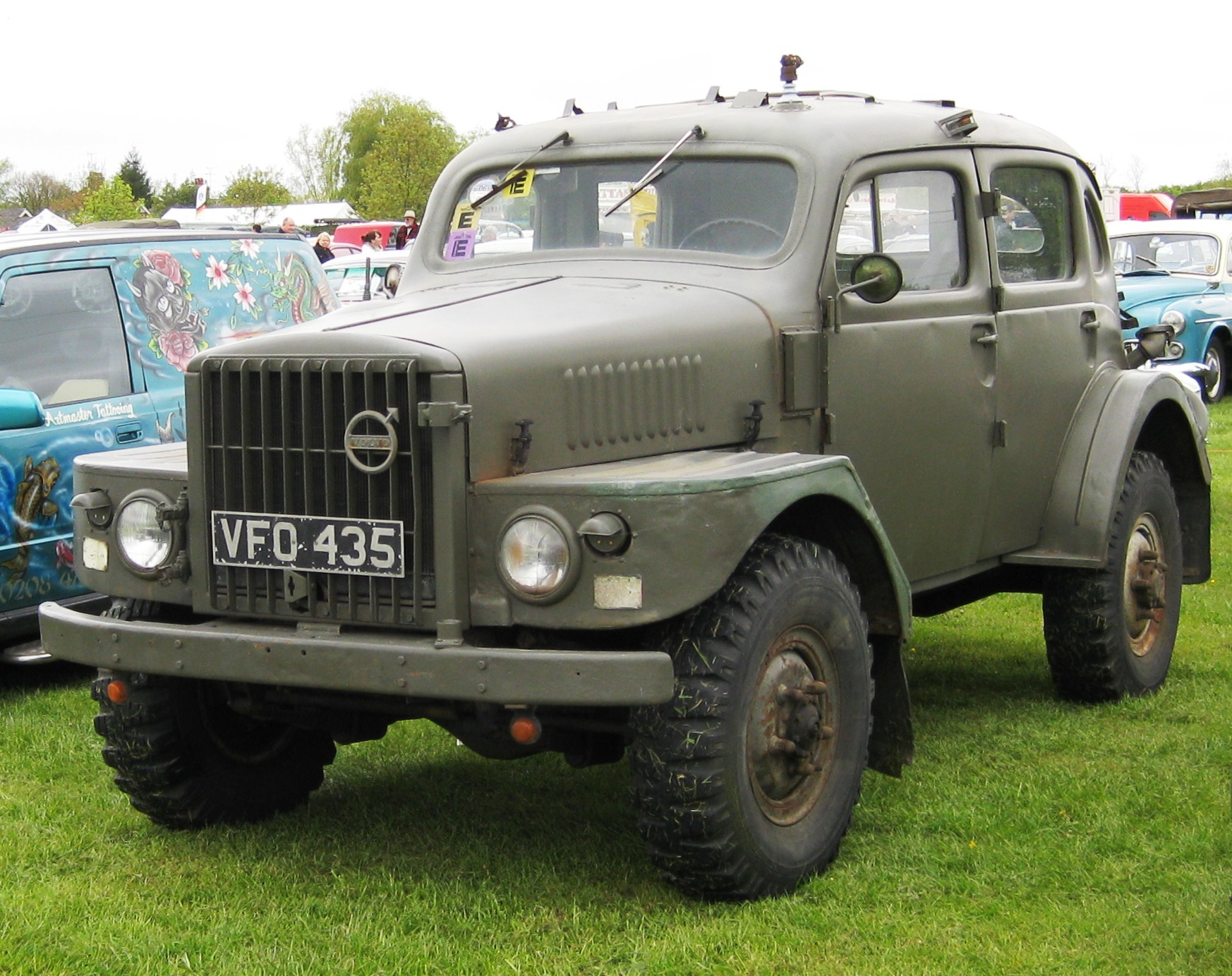

Overview
- Also called: Raptgb 915; P2104
- Production: 1953–1958

Powertrain
- Engine: 3.6L ED I6
- Transmission: Volvo E9

In 1953 Volvo introduced a successor to the TPV for the armed forces, the four-wheel drive Raptgb 915 (military name), TP21/P2104 (Volvo military designation), P2104 (Volvo civilian designation). It was powered by the well proven 90 hp (67 kW), 3.67 litre inline 6 mated to a Volvo E9 gearbox. The military version used to be called "Terräng-Sugga", though today the enthusiasts of this particular model seem to have somewhat hijacked the nickname "Suggan".

=== Versions ===
- PV831/832: 1950–1957, 4135 cars built
- PV833/834: 1950–1958, 2081 cars built, commercial chassis
- TP21: 1953–1958, 720 cars built, military off-road vehicle

Also see the Volvo L-3314.

== Gallery ==
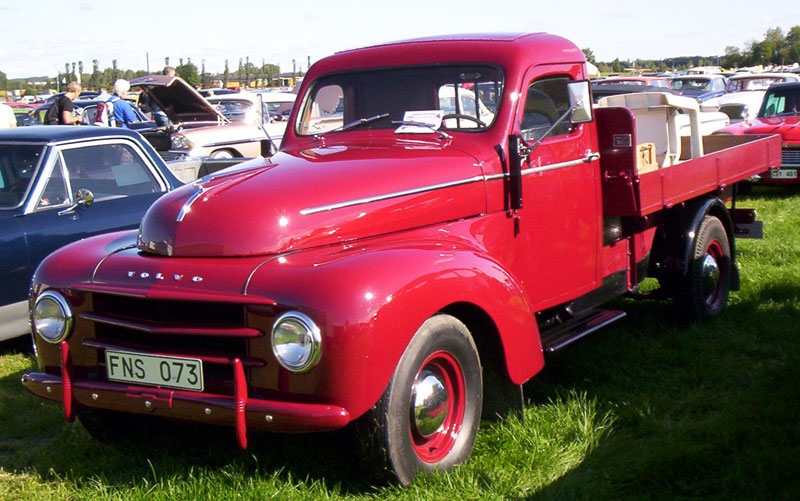
Volvo PV 833 Pickup 1952

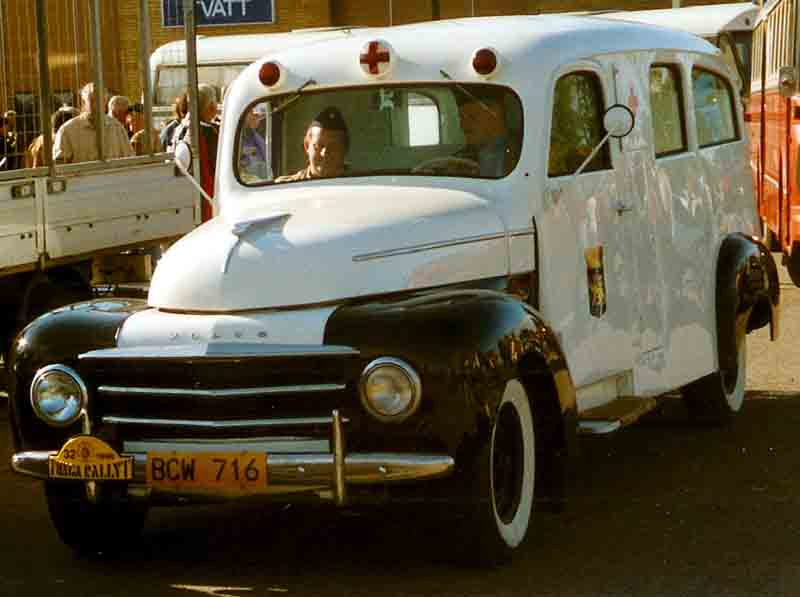
Volvo PV834 Ambulance 1951

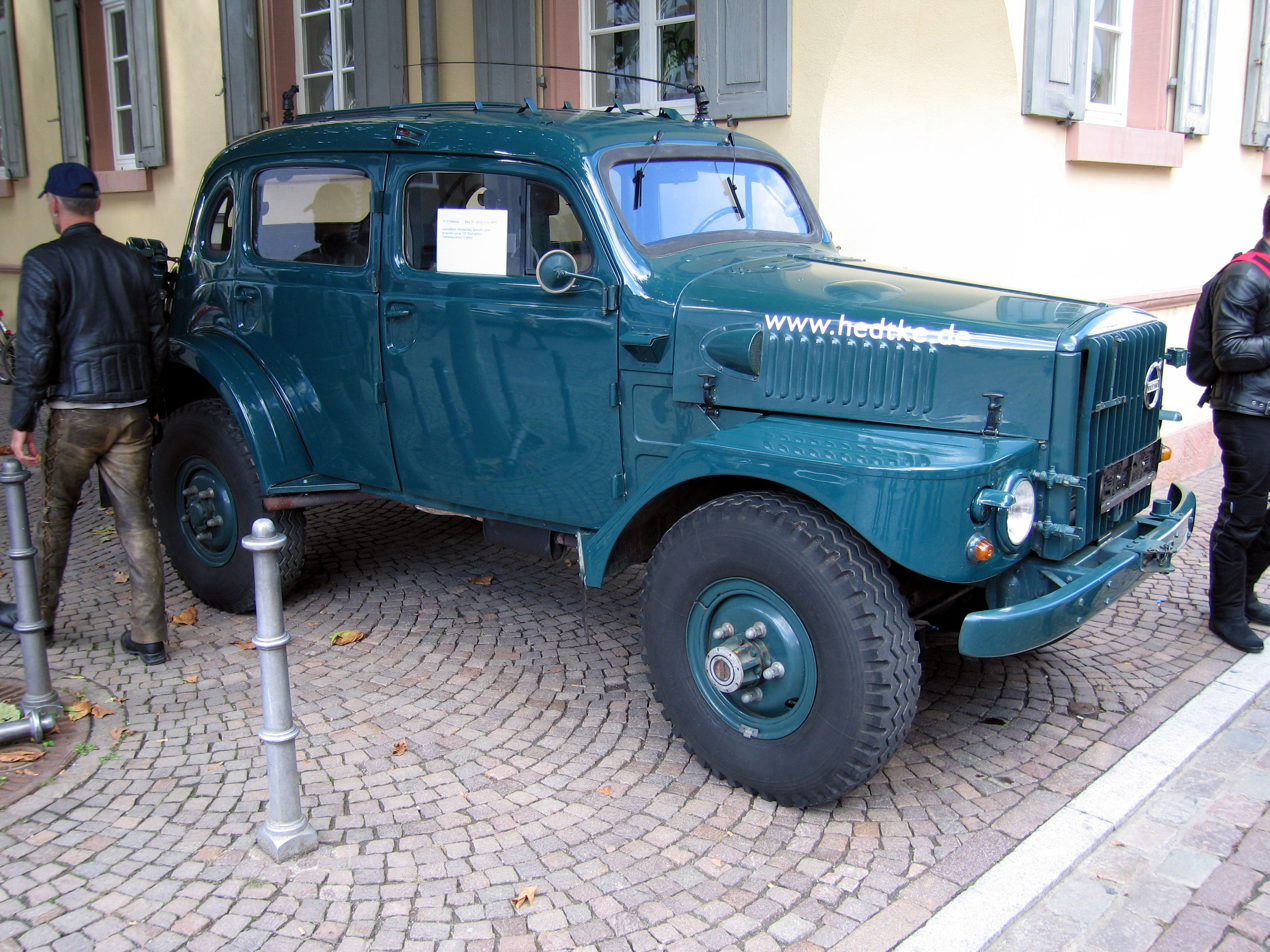
The military Volvo TP21

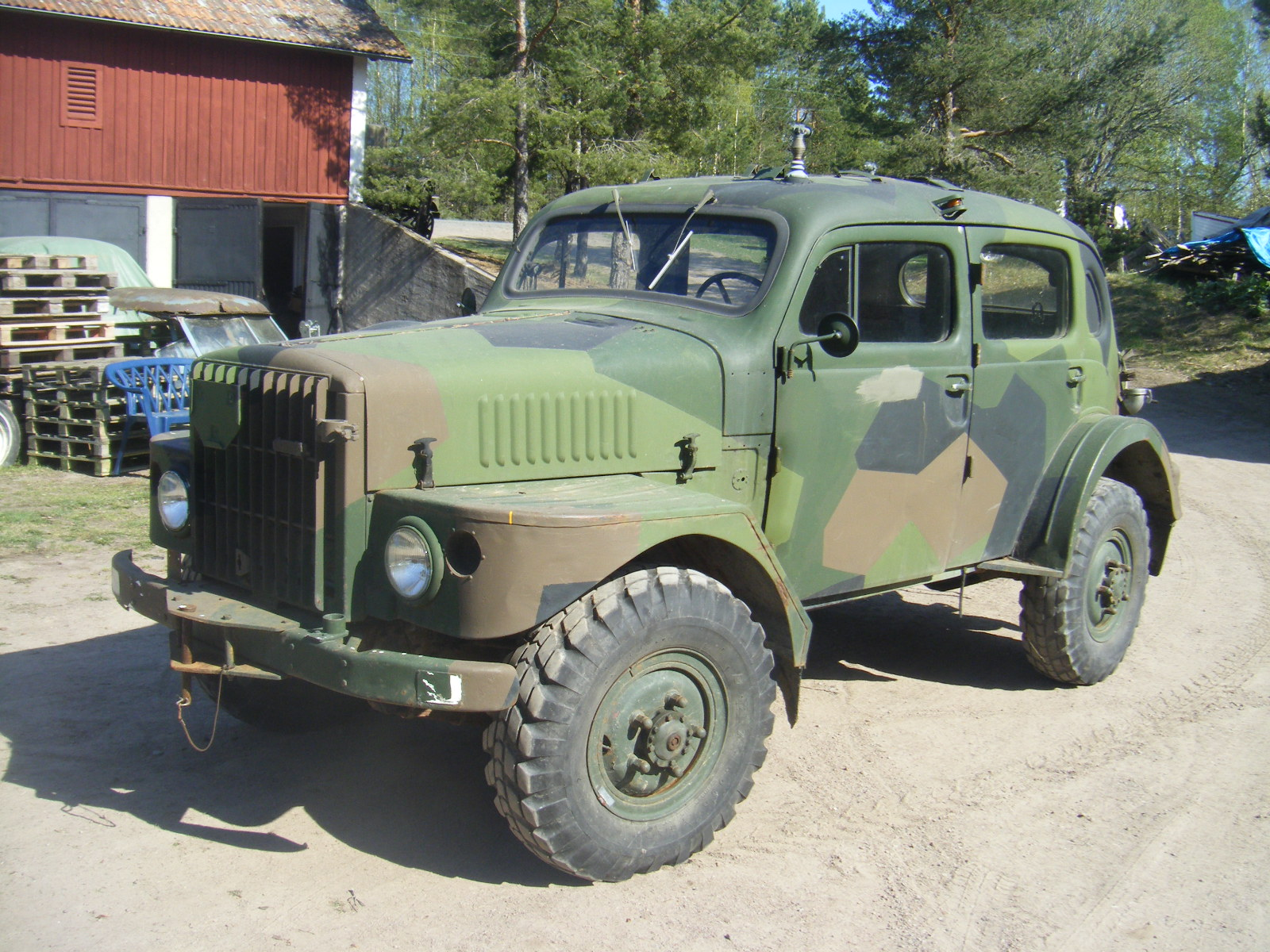
1954 Volvo TP21 M/90 Camouflage
