= Volvo Penta =

Swedish engine manufacturing subsidiary

AB Volvo Penta
- Type: Subsidiary
- Founded: 1907; 119 years ago
- Headquarters: Gothenburg, Sweden
- Areas served: Worldwide
- Key people: Anna Müller (President)
- Products: Marine and industrial engines
- Revenue: ▲18.102 billion kr (2022)
- Number of employees: 2,022 (2022)
- Parent: Volvo
- Website: volvopenta.com

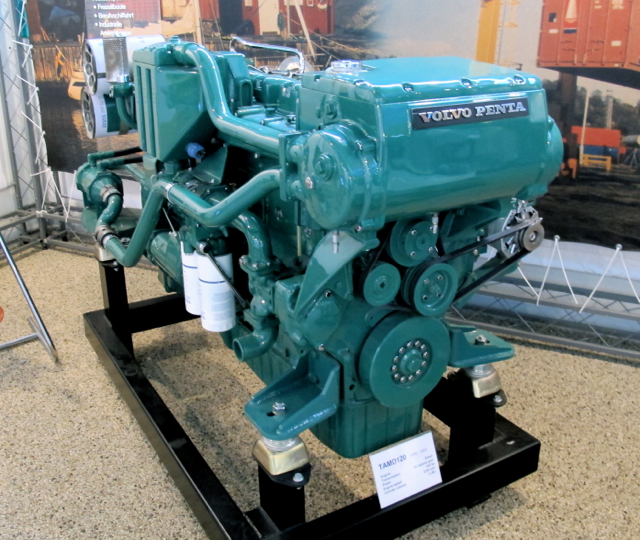
A Volvo Penta TAMD120 diesel engine, built 1970-1983

Volvo Penta 6-cylinder diesel engine sound.

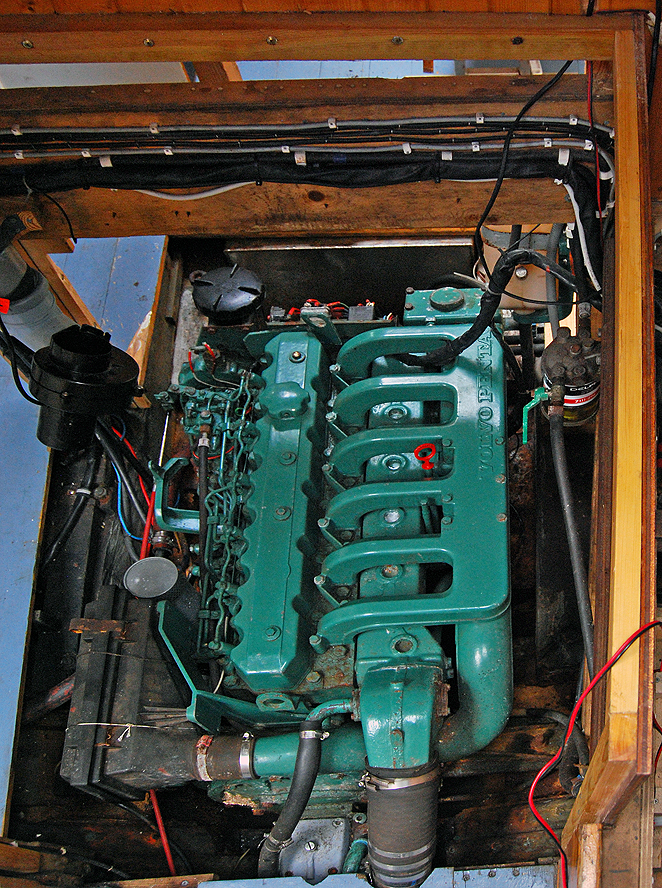
Volvo Penta 6-cylinder diesel engine.

Volvo Penta is a Swedish marine and industrial engine manufacturer, a joint stock company within the Volvo Group. Volvo Penta evolved from a foundry in Skövde 1907, when the first marine engine, the B1, was manufactured. The name Penta was created about 1916. The Penta company soon became an established internal combustion engine manufacturer, which in 1927 delivered the engine for Volvo's first passenger car.

Volvo acquired Penta in 1935 and Volvo Penta has been part of the Volvo Group since then. In 1973, the production of outboard motors was acquired. In this process, the Archimedes brand was purchased from the company Electrolux, which had also acquired it in 1941. Archimedes itself was a Swedish company that was a pioneer in the manufacture of outboard motors. It now provides internal combustion engines (ICEs) and complete power systems to the marine industry, power-generating equipment, and similar industrial applications. The business also manufacturers sterndrive and inboard drive systems such as the Volvo Penta IPS. The engine program comprises petroleum fuel (diesel and gasoline) engines with power outputs of between 7.5 and 1,500 kilowatts (10 and 2,039 PS; 10 and 2,012 bhp).

== History ==
In 1868, engineer Johan George Grönvall, also known as John G. Grönvall, founded a mechanical workshop and foundry in Skövde, Sweden. The company became limited in 1875, known as Sköfde Gjuteri och Mekaniska Verkstad or simply Gjuteriet. Products ranged from pots and vents to stoves and brewery equipment. Soon Gjuteriet also started manufacturing agricultural equipment and equipment for sawmills.

The company expanded heavily in the early 1900s, and started producing steam engines and water turbines for hydraulic power plants. In 1907, a very fruitful co-operation with the Stockholm-based engineering company Fritz Egnell began, with a one-cylinder 3 hp compression ignition engine. The engine was simply named B1 - but a five-man committee was set to find a name that would catch on. The committee failed to agree on a catchy name, but because it had five members, settled for Penta.

In 1916, Egnell bought the company and the name changed to AB Pentaverken. Production was concentrated on engines, mostly for maritime applications. The years immediately after World War I were economically harsh, but a new product was introduced: a small two cylinder U2 outboard engine designed by Carl-Axel Skärlund. The U2 was slightly improved in 1926, and renamed U21 and remained in production until 1962. The U2/U21 was a great success and exported worldwide. In many countries, U21 is still synonymous with outboard engine.

In 1925, Penta was approached by Assar Gabrielsson, the founder of Volvo, who needed an engine for the first Volvo automobile. Penta then designed the four cylinder 28 hp side valve Typ DA engine for the Volvo ÖV 4. In 1935, Penta became a subsidiary of Volvo.

== Current operations ==
=== Marine engines and complete marine propulsion systems ===
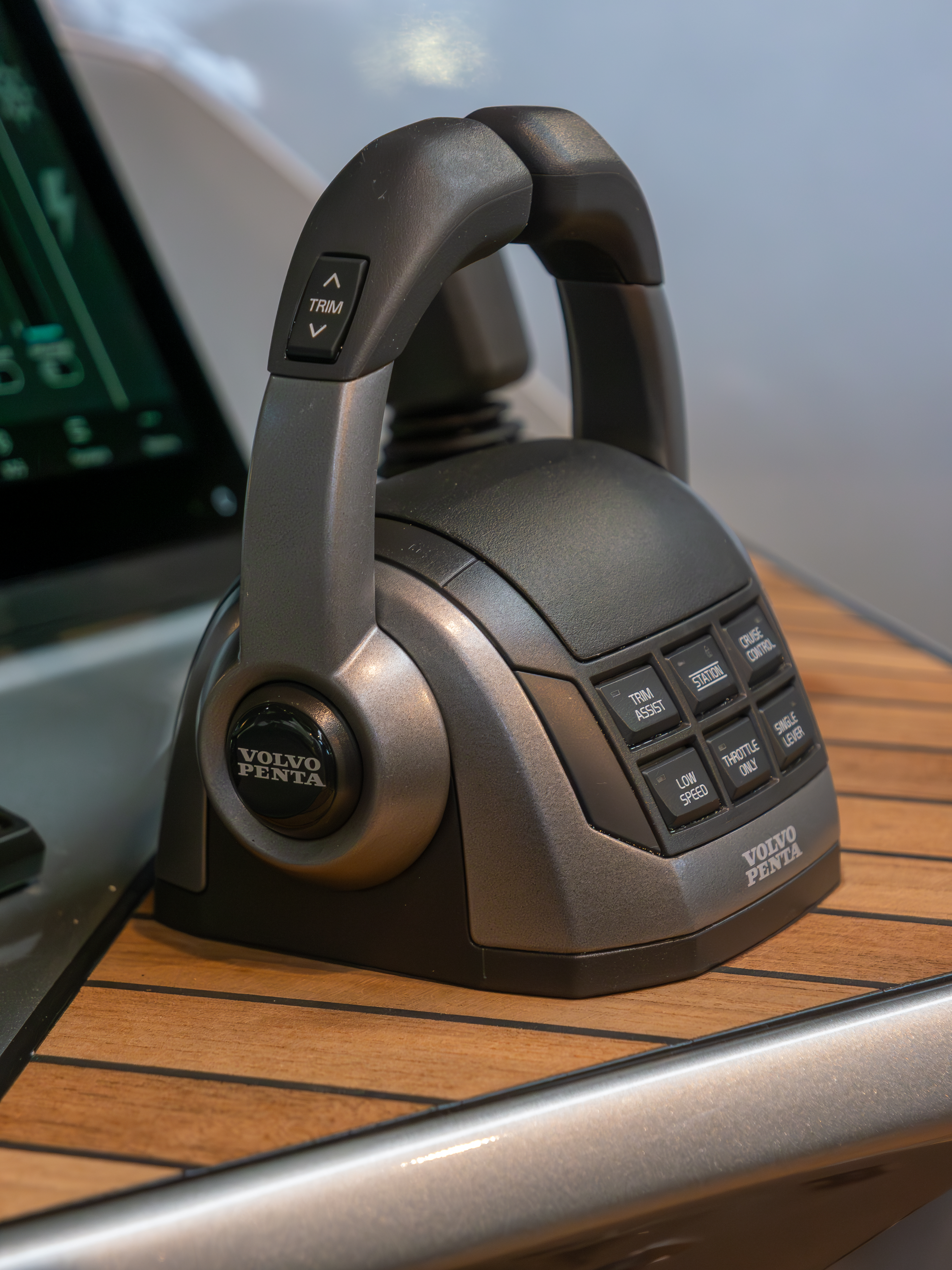
Dual engine control levers by Volvo Penta Marine of a SAY 42 carbon yacht

Volvo Penta has introduced several industry-first innovations to the marine engine market, including the sterndrive unit, contra-rotating propellers Duoprop, and Forward Drive. In 2005, Volvo Penta launched the first IPS (Inboard Performance System) engine, a new "pod type" boat drive system with counter rotating forward-facing propellers operated by a joystick. Its engines are used by more than 140 boat manufacturers, including Tiara Yachts, Fairline Boats, Sunseeker, Riviera, Four Winns, Sea Ray, Hanse, Bavaria and Cranchi. In conjunction with Volvo owned CPAC Systems, Volvo Penta and Yamaha Motor signed an agreement involving technological partnership in December 2010. Volvo Penta have a strong presence in the Marine Commercial segment; many passenger ferries, workboats, Military vessels, dive support vessels and fishing vessels utilise Volvo Penta engines for propulsion, power generation or auxiliary equipment such as bow thrusters. Most recently, Volvo Penta has been the number one choice of propulsion and power generation for offshore wind farm vessels, a.k.a. Crew transfer vessel (CTV). Operators can appreciate the reliability and performance from Volvo Penta engines and IPS propulsion systems. With ever-demanding focus on reducing CO_{2} emissions, Volvo Penta have released to market a hybrid solution for utilising electric motors mated to IPS drives.

=== Industrial engines ===
The company sells its engines to a variety of users, including many generator manufacturers, such as Aggreko Sdmo, Genpower, Kohler and Shanghai Dingxin Electric Group. Its engines are also used in mining equipment and stone-crushing machinery.

=== Manufacturing bases ===
The company has a number of manufacturing bases for diesel engines at Vara, Sweden; Lingang, China; and Lexington, Tennessee, United States, for all gasoline engines and sterndrives. Volvo Penta operates worldwide and has around 4,000 dealers in 130 countries.
