= Assar Gabrielsson =

Swedish industrialist (1891–1962)

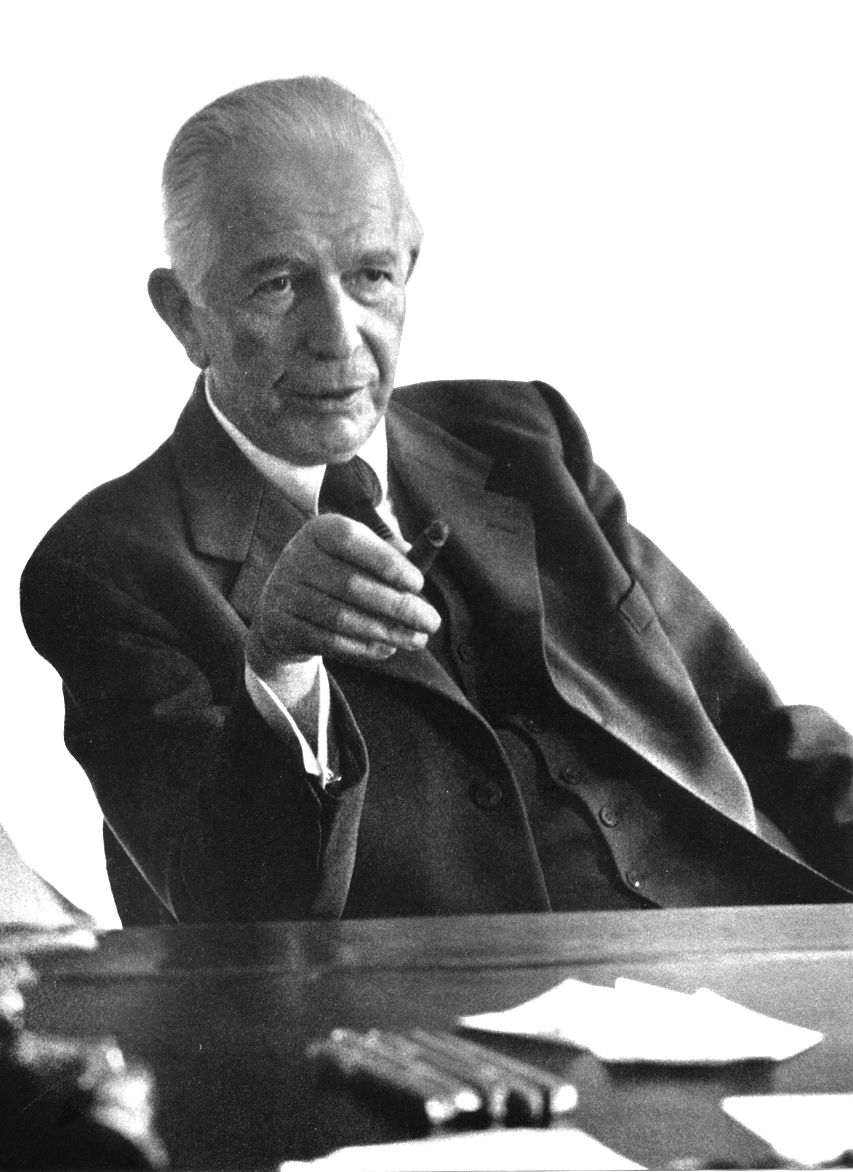
- Gabrielsson at Volvo AB in 1960.
- Born: Assar Thorvald Nathaniel Gabrielsson; 13 August 1891; Korsberga, Skaraborgs län, Sweden
- Died: 28 May 1962 (aged 70); Gothenburg, Sweden
- Known for: co-founder of Volvo
- Spouse: Anna Theresia "Tessan" Andreasson (1916-1962)
- Children: Lars, Barbro, Jan and Bo
- Parent(s): Gabriel Nathanael Gabrielsson and Anna Helmina Larsson

Assar Thorvald Nathanael Gabrielsson (13 August 1891 – 28 May 1962) was a Swedish industrialist and co-founder of Volvo.

== Early life ==
Gabrielsson was born on 13 August 1891 in Korsberga, Skaraborg County, Sweden, the son of Gabriel Nathanael Gabrielsson and Anna Helmina Larsson, who married on 14 April 1889. The father was a manager at Korsberga brickworks and later became a leaseholder of Spännefalla farm near the dairy in Tibro, where he started an egg shop. Assar Gabrielsson was the first child of three. He had a brother five years younger, Börje Gabrielsson, who in parallel with Assar was the managing director of Astra for thirty years. He passed studentexamen in 1909 and graduated from Stockholm School of Economics in 1911.

== Career ==
Assar Gabrielsson held a bachelor's degree in economics and worked as a sales manager with bearing manufacturer SKF in Gothenburg in the early 1900s. He was employed in 1916 by Björn Prytz at the sales department and was appointed sales manager for the entire SKF company group on 20 June 1922. He held that position until the new automobile company AB Volvo was founded as a subsidiary company within the SKF company group.

=== Volvo, the automobile project ===
In June 1924, when Assar Gabrielsson met his old friend Gustaf Larson in Stockholm, he unveiled his plans to establish the manufacturing of a new Swedish automobile. Gustaf Larson had worked for SKF between 1917 and 1919 but now worked for the company AB Galco in Stockholm. They made an agreement in August 1924 at the Sturehof restaurant in Stockholm, signed in a written contract more than one year later, on 16 December 1925. In this contract Gustav was supposed to carry out the engineering work for a new car as well as an investment plan for a new manufacturing plant, with the stipulation that he would only be rewarded for his work in the event that; the project succeeds, at least 100 cars were produced in this new plant, and that this was to be achieved before 1 January 1928. This famous contract shows that Assar Gabrielsson "owned" the project and that it was a high-risk project without any guarantees. Assar took the economic risks himself and Gustav, in the worst case, would have worked on the project without being rewarded, but would still have his salary from AB Galco in Stockholm. Most of the startup capital Assar intended to use for the project was extra sales commissions that he had saved from his time as managing director for the SKF subsidiary in Paris from 1921 to 1922.

==== Back to 1922-23 ====
The original idea, presented by Assar to SKF, consisted of a few main points; the central idea was to start an automobile manufacturing business within SKF to gain advantages over competitors when developing new bearings for the automobile industry, which would also lead to increased sales of bearings and in turn lead to positive effects on Swedish industry as a whole. He developed these ideas during the time he worked as managing director for the SKF subsidiary company in Paris 1921-22 when he discovered that competing bearing companies in Europe had started to invest a large amount in automobile companies in order to secure their sales to key customers. However, Gabrielsson failed to convince the board of SKF about his ideas, as SKF's core business model was the manufacturing of bearings with no room for the incorporation of an automobile company. Assar then decided to build a test series of ten vehicles with his own financing to later present the vehicles and an entire investment plan to SKF. The idea to build a pre-series of ten vehicles was most certainly related to the fact that no company would have given them an offer for the components (engines, gearboxes, chassis components etc.) with a lesser quantity, and because Assar was certain that SKF would approve his plans in due time. Engineering, documentation and investment planning was carried out exactly in the same way as if it had been carried out by SKF in order to prepare for the set up of a new automobile company. Assar had the full support from the managing director of SKF, Mr. Björn Prytz, as long as his 'private' project did not interfere with his work as sales manager at SKF.

The first ten pre-series vehicles, model ÖV 4, were designed and assembled in Stockholm at AB Galco under the supervision of Gustav Larson, at that time still having his other work at AB Galco to attend to. A "design-office", often called "Volvo's first design-office", was established in one room of Gustav Larson's private apartment at Rådmansgatan 59 in Stockholm. The design work started in the autumn of 1924 and a number of engineers were involved, among them engineer Jan G. Smith, that had returned from America in 1924, and later engineer Henry Westerberg. All the invoices related to the project was sent to Assar's private address at Kungsportsavenyn 32 in Gothenburg. In a lot of orders that Gustav Larsson made himself, he referred to Assar Gabrielsson as a "guarantee" that the deliveries would be paid by him personally. These details shows that the Volvo automobile project in the beginning was a true private project, not sponsored by SKF from an economic point of view.

The first prototype car was ready in June 1926. Assar and Gustav took that first car and drove themselves, on bumpy roads, down to SKF in Gothenburg to show the SKF-board and now present the final investment plan.

==== The automobile company AB Volvo is founded ====
At a board meeting held in Hofors, Sweden on 10 August 1926, SKF decided to use the old subsidiary company Volvo AB, for the automobile project. AB Volvo, that was first registered in 1915 on the initiative of Björn Prytz, was originally set up to be used for a special series of ball bearings for the American market but it was never really used for this purpose. A small series of ball bearings stamped with Volvo was manufactured but it was never introduced on a larger scale. A contract was signed on 12 August 1926 between SKF and Assar, stipulating that all ten prototype cars, engineering drawings, calculations etc. should be handed over to Volvo AB and Assar in return would be refunded most of his private investments for the prototype cars. In other words, Assar Gabrielsson sold his project to AB Volvo. The contract was signed by Björn Prytz, managing director of SKF and Assar Gabrielsson. In the original contract from 16 December 1925 Assar stated that he might sell the automobile project to any company that would be interested, but of course hoped that SKF would be the company to stand first in line. Larsson also finally got paid for the initial engineering work with the ÖV4 according to the 'private' contract he and Assar had signed on 16 December 1925.

Assar Gabrielsson left his position as sales manager for SKF and was appointed president and managing director for the 'new' Volvo AB on 1 January 1927. Gustav Larson was at the same time appointed vice president and technical manager and left his employment at AB Galco in Stockholm.

==== The first series produced Volvo ÖV4 ====
On 14 April 1927 at about 10 p.m., the first series produced ÖV 4 left the new established factory on Hisingen in Gothenburg.

The ten prototype cars that had been assembled in Stockholm were never sold, except for one that was sold to Volvo's photographer Sven Sjöstedt and was later donated to the Volvo Industrial Museum around 1930, but was used as transportation vehicles within the manufacturing plant and as 'test benches' for new developed components during the first years.

==== Economic problems ====
Volvo did not show any profit for the first couple years and SKF invested a large amount of capital to keep the company running. Seeing the need to diversify, in 1928 the production of trucks began with the basic chassis components from ÖV4. The production of trucks was small-scale in the beginning, but the concept was successful from start. Regardless, in late 1929 SKF nearly sold the company to Charles Nash, president of Nash Motors in the United States. Björn Prytz and Assar Gabrielsson managed to convince the SKF board to call the deal off, just one day before Charles Nash arrived by boat to Gothenburg. Charles Nash and Assar Gabrielsson became good friends during his visit in Sweden, and Assar later visited Nash in America on several occasions to discuss the automobile business. By the end of 1930 AB Volvo showed a small profit for the first time. In 1935 SKF came to the conclusion that AB Volvo was ready to stand on its own feet as a public company, introducing Volvo to the Stockholm stock exchange. With this move, SKF relieved themselves of a majority of their shares and could now concentrate on their core business, development and manufacturing of bearings.

==== Volvo - finally a success ====
When Assar celebrated his 50th birthday in 1941, the 50,000th Volvo car was delivered. It took ten years to produce the first 25,000 cars but only four years for the next 25,000 cars. In 1944–45, just after the end of the Second World War, the 'modern' family car PV444 was introduced with a completely new design. The PV444 was an immediate sales success. The company now stood on solid ground and the production of both cars and trucks was increasing fast.

=== The last years ===
Assar Gabrielsson held his position as managing director for AB Volvo until 1956 when he became the chairman of the board (CEO) of the Volvo group, a position he held until his death in 1962.

== Chronology ==
- 1891 Born 13 August in Korsberga, Skaraborgs län, Sweden. The son of Gabriel Nathanael Gabrielsson and Anna Helmina Larsson.
- 1911 Bachelor's degree in Business Administration from Stockholm School of Economics (HHS).
- 1912–1916 Employed as stenographer in the Chancellery of the Lower House of the Swedish Parliament.
- 1916 Marries Anna Theresia Andreasson.
- 1916–1920 Employed by SKF in Gothenburg in the sales department.
- 1921–1922 Managing Director of the SKF subsidiary in Paris, France.
- 1922–1926 Sales Manager for the SKF-company group.
- 1926–1956 Managing Director at AB Volvo.
- 1947–1951 President of the Congress of Industrial Organizations.
- 1956–1962 Chairman of the board of AB Volvo.

== Personal life ==
Gabrielsson married on 4 March 1916 to Anna Theresia ("Tessan"), née Andreasson (1889–1964) in Skövde, the daughter of lineman Johan Peter Andreasson (1849–) and his first wife Augusta Mathilda Nyberg (1862–). The Gabrielsson couple lived for many years at Kungsportsavenyen 34 in Gothenburg. and had four children: Lars, Barbro, Jan and Bo.

Gabrielsson is interred at Kvastekulla griftegård in Partille.

== Awards and decorations ==
=== Swedish ===
- (Sweden) Commander Grand Cross of the Order of the Polar Star (6 June 1957)
- (Sweden) Commander Second Class of the Order of Vasa
- (Sweden) Royal Institute of Technology's Great Prize (1955)
- (Sweden) Clarence von Rosen Medal (1942)
- (Sweden) Royal Swedish Academy of Engineering Sciences de Laval medal (1929)

=== Foreign ===
- Commander of the Order of the White Rose of Finland
- (Iceland) Grand Knight's Cross of the Order of the Falcon (23 July 1936)

== Honours ==
- Member of the Royal Swedish Academy of Engineering Sciences
- Member of the Royal Society of Arts and Sciences in Gothenburg (1956)
- Honorary doctorate in economics at Stockholm School of Economics (1959)
- Honorary member of the Swedish MTM association (1960)
