= Sun Odyssey 36.2 =

Sailboat class

Development
- Designer: Jacques Fauroux
- Location: France
- Year: 1998
- Builder: Jeanneau
- Role: Cruiser

Boat
- Displacement: 12,345 lb (5,600 kg)
- Draft: 6.16 ft (1.88 m)

Hull
- Type: monohull
- Construction: fiberglass
- LOA: 36.80 ft (11.22 m)
- LWL: 30.50 ft (9.30 m)
- Beam: 12.25 ft (3.73 m)
- Engine: Volvo 27 hp (20 kW) diesel engine

Hull appendages
- Keel: fin keel
- Ballast: 3,417 lb (1,550 kg)
- Rudder: spade-type rudder

Rig
- Rig type: Bermuda rig

Sails
- Sailplan: masthead sloop
- Total sail area: 410.00 sq ft (38.090 m^{2})

Racing
- PHRF: 114-150

The Sun Odyssey 36.2, also called the Jeanneau 36.2, is a French sailboat that was designed by Jacques Fauroux as a cruiser and first built in 1998.

The same basic design was also sold with different interior layouts as the Moorings 36.2 for Moorings Yacht Charter and as the Stardust 363.2 for the general yacht charter market.

== Production ==
The design was built by Jeanneau in France, starting in 1998, but it is now out of production.

== Design ==
The Sun Odyssey 36.2 is a recreational keelboat, built predominantly of fiberglass, with wood trim. The hull has plywood reinforcements. It has a masthead sloop rig with two sets of spreaders and aluminum spars made by Z-Diffusion of France. The hull has a raked stem, a reverse transom with steps and a swimming platform, an internally mounted spade-type rudder controlled by a 50 in (130 cm) diameter wheel and a fixed fin keel. It displaces 12,345 lb (5,600 kg) and carries 3,417 lb (1,550 kg) of ballast.

The boat has a draft of 6.16 ft (1.88 m) with the standard keel.

The boat is fitted with a Swedish Volvo Penta MD2040 of 40 hp (30 kW) or Japanese Yanmar diesel engine of 27 hp (20 kW) for docking and maneuvering.

The design has sleeping accommodation for four to six people, with two cabin "owner" models and three cabin charter models. Both have a double "V"-berth in the bow cabin, a starboard L-shaped settee in the main cabin and either an aft cabin with a double berth or two smaller aft cabins. Models sold in the US have a main cabin fold out settee berth to port, while those sold in Europe have two seats instead. The galley is located on the starboard side just forward of the companionway ladder. The galley is L-shaped and is equipped with a two-burner stove, an ice box and a double sink. A navigation station is opposite the galley, on the port side. The head is located aft on the port side and includes a shower. There are two heads, one just aft of the bow cabin on the port side and one on the starboard side in the aft cabin. Cabin headroom is 76 in (193 cm).

The design has a hull speed of 7.4 kn (13.7 km/h) and a PHRF handicap of 114 to 150.

== Operational history ==
In a 1997 review for Practical Sailor Darrell Nicholson wrote, "In profile, the bow has a short overhang and the sheerline is nearly flat. Its displacement/length ratio is 193, which is moderately low, meaning there is not much volume below the waterline and that there is a definite emphasis on speed. But because the 36.2 is intended to be an all-around family boat, the sail area to displacement ratio is a relatively conservative 15.9. The sail plan offers plenty of power to move her, but shouldn't require unusually early reefing to keep her on her lines. Comparatively flatbottomed boats such as the 36.2 like to be sailed fairly level and may exhibit undesirable handling tendencies when heeled excessively."

== See also ==
- List of sailing boat types
