= Jan Smith (disambiguation) =

Jan Smith is an American singer.

Jan or Janice Smith may also refer to:

- Janice Smith, an American furniture maker
- Jan Smith (footballer) (born 1956), an Australian rules footballer
- Jan Smith (speed skater) (1945-2022), an American speed skater
- Jan G. Smith (1895-1966), a Swedish automotive engineer
