= Sturehof =

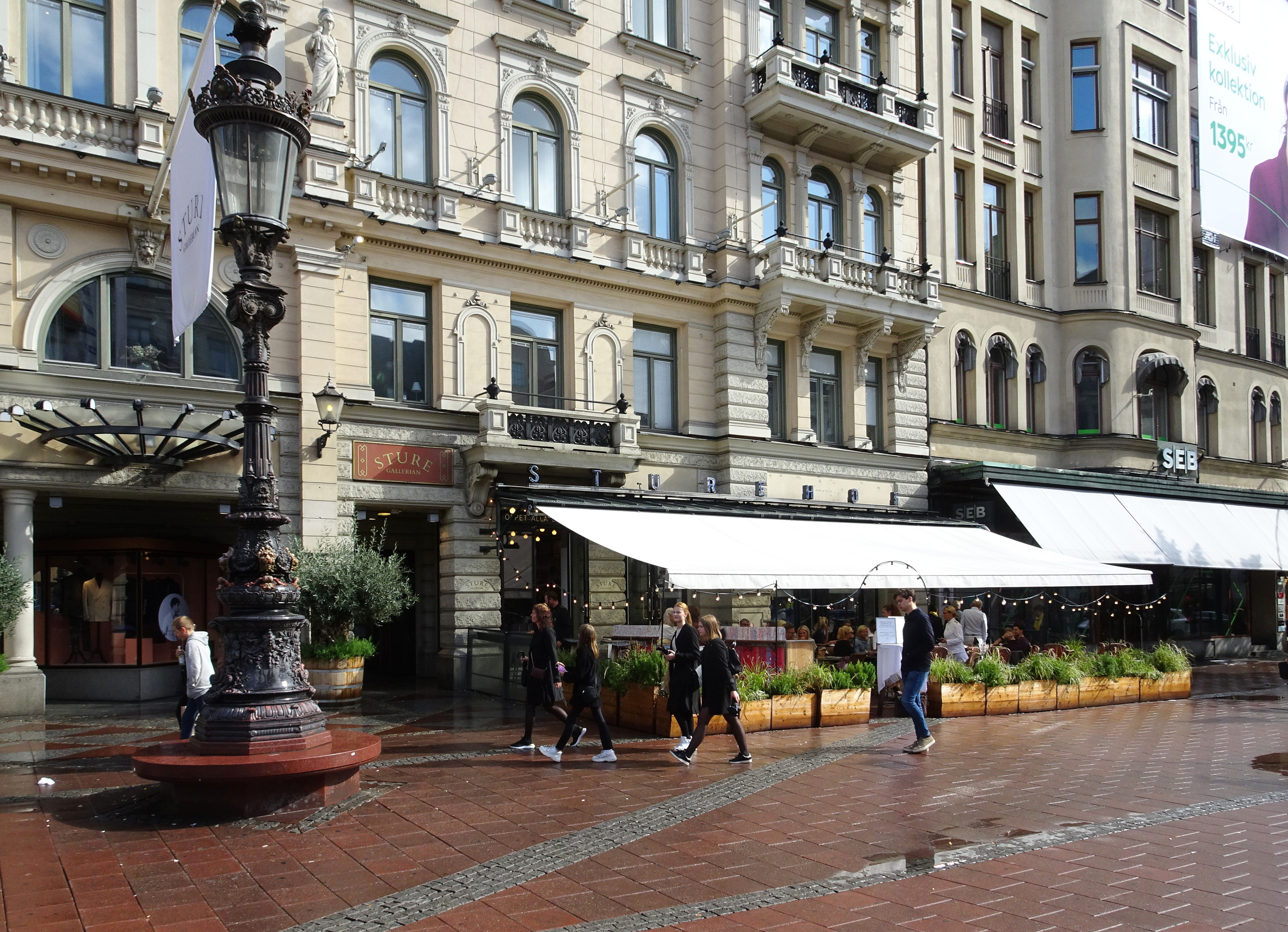
- Sturehof in September 2019
- Interactive map of Sturehof

Restaurant information
- Established: 1897; 129 years ago
- Food type: Seafood and shellfish
- Location: Stockholm, Sweden
- Coordinates: 59°20′09.02″N 018°04′23.49″E

Sturehof is a seafood and shellfish restaurant located on the Stureplan in central Stockholm, Sweden.

== History ==
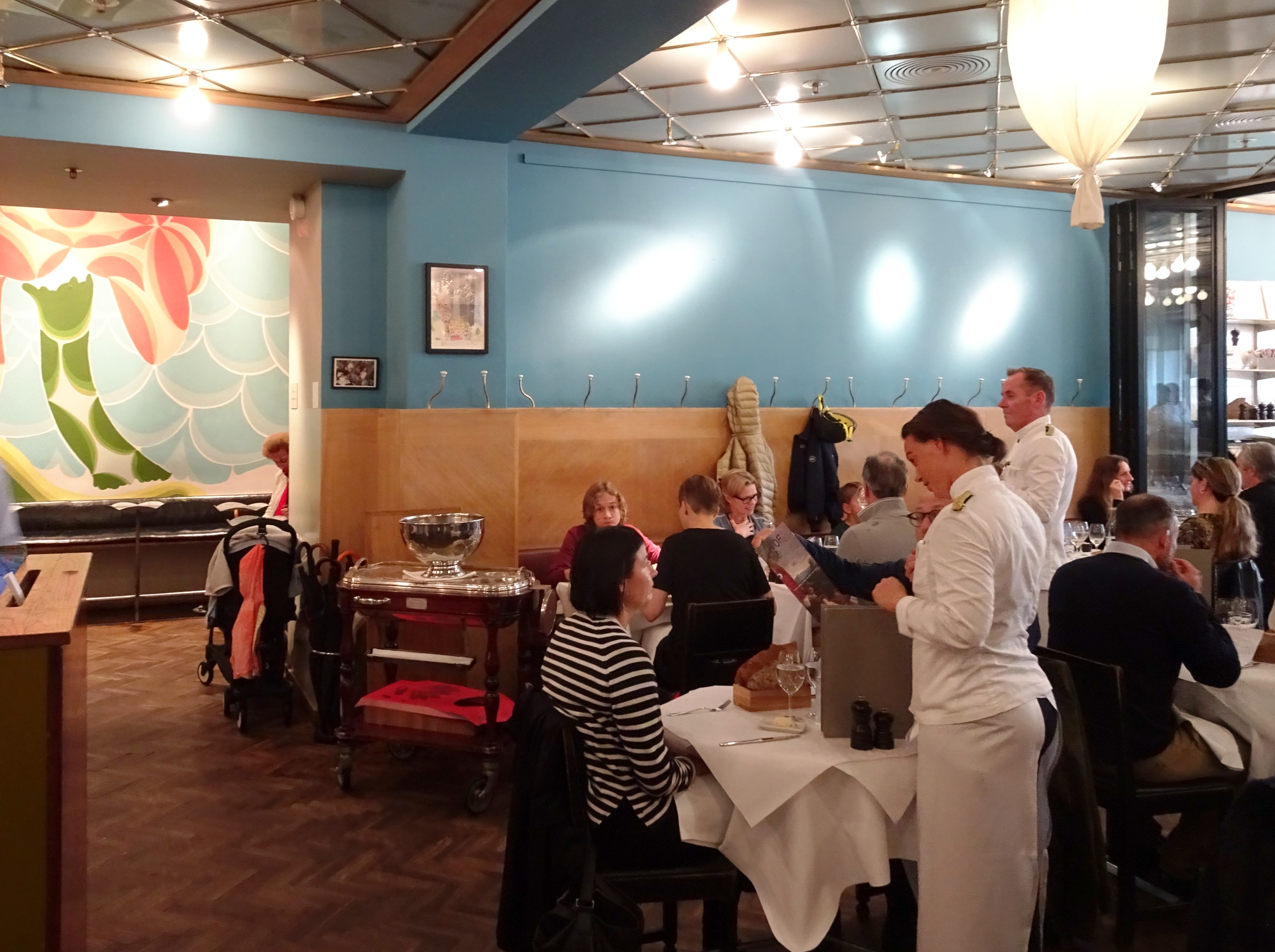
Sturehof interior in September 2019

The origins of the restaurant are generally traced to 1897, when Ernst Marcus opened a beer bar called Malta in the building. However, another establishment had been located on the same premises since 1887, which explains why Sturehof celebrated its 130th anniversary in 2017. The name Sturehof was adopted in 1905, and the restaurant was run by the Marcus family until 1976. It now belongs to Svenska Brasserier, a restaurant company that operates a few establishments on and around the Stureplan.

Sturehof has always specialised in serving fish and shellfish, but its reputation has changed over time. Long considered a beer bar, it is now praised for its wine list and has served notable figures including Bill Clinton, John Bon Jovi and John Kerry.

In 2017, a project of urban renewal of the Stureplan is threatening Sturehof. This project is opposed by the restaurant's owners, who have said they will not relocate if the building is torn down.

It was at Sturehof the automobile company Volvo was "born" when, in August 1924, Assar Gabrielsson and Gustaf Larson made an agreement to try to start a new automotive company in Sweden. The private agreement, handwritten by Assar Gabrielsson, was not finalized until more than a year later, 16 December 1925.

== See also ==
- List of seafood restaurants
