= Björn Prytz =

Swedish businessman and diplomat (1887–1976)

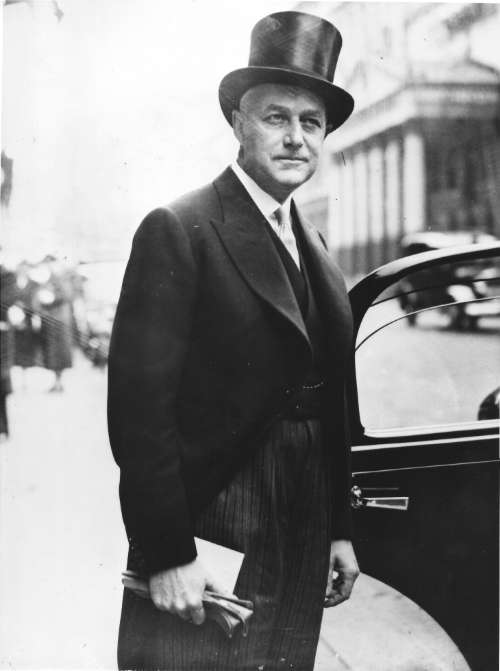
- Prytz in London in 1938

Ambassador of Sweden to the United Kingdom
- In office 1 June 1938 – 31 March 1947
- Preceded by: Hans Beck-Friis
- Succeeded by: Erik Boheman

Personal details
- Born: Björn Gustaf Prytz; 2 April 1887 Gothenburg, Sweden
- Died: 22 June 1976 (aged 89) Marstrand, Sweden
- Citizenship: British (1905–1919); Swedish (1887–1905, 1919–1976)
- Spouse(s): Ingrid Mellgren (m. 1912; div. 1924) Aino A:son Kantele (m. 1933)
- Children: 3, including Agneta Prytz
- Relatives: Gösta Folke (son-in-law)
- Education: Dulwich College
- Occupation: Industrialist, diplomat

Björn Gustaf Prytz (2 April 1887 – 22 June 1976) was a Swedish industrialist in the early 1900s and from 1938 to 1946 Minister Plenipotentiary in London for the Swedish government.

Prytz first registered the name Volvo, later used by the car company, as a subsidiary of the ball bearing company SKF In 1940, as Swedish plenipotentiary, he was involved in discussions with British government officials exploring a compromise peace with Nazi Germany.

== Early life ==
Prytz was born on 2 April 1887 in Gothenburg, Sweden, the son of Gustav Prytz, a wholesaler, and Theresa Ward White. Prytz, whose mother was British, spent much of his youth in London and attended Dulwich College from 1898 to 1902.

== SKF and Volvo ==
He was employed 1913 at S.K.F. as marketing manager. He became managing director for S.K.F. around 1921–22. Björn Prytz was the man behind the name Volvo during the time he was the managing director for SKF sales company in America 1914–18. Volvo was registered as a trademark, as well as a subsidiary company to SKF, in May 1915 (the application for Volvo as a trademark was sent to PRV on May 11), with the intention to use it for a new developed low-price ball bearing for the automobile industry in the America. However, these plans were never realized and the SKF name and logotype (as it looks today) was used instead for all type of bearings produced by SKF.

The name and company Volvo was almost forgotten but came into use when the SKF employee Assar Gabrielsson (SKF sales manager) and engineer Gustav Larson finally had succeeded to convince SKF that they should start to manufacture automobiles within SKF. AB Volvo, as an automobile company, was founded 10 August 1926 at a board meeting held in Hofors when SKF decided to invest in the company and use it as a subsidiary company within the SKF-group.

== "Prytz Affair" ==
On 17 June 1940, Prytz had a meeting with the British Foreign Office Minister R.A. "Rab" Butler, at which the possibility of Britain making a compromise peace with Nazi Germany was discussed. Prytz reported back to Stockholm that Butler, after consulting with Foreign Secretary Lord Halifax, had declared that British policy must be determined by "common sense not bravado" and that "no opportunity for reaching a compromise (peace) would be neglected if the possibility were offered on reasonable conditions."

Prytz reported the details of the meeting in a telegram to the Swedish government the same day, and Churchill discovered this, probably because the Government Code and Cypher School was intercepting and decrypting Swedish diplomatic cables. Churchill wrote to Halifax on 26 June 1940, complaining that Butler's "odd language", hinted at defeatism and embarrassed the British government. Butler, made a four-page handwritten reply the same day, claiming that he had kept to the official British line and had said "nothing definite or specific that I would wish to withdraw", and offering to resign. His resignation offer was not accepted.

== Personal life ==
In 1912, Prytz married Ingrid Mellgren (1888–1967). In 1933, he married Aino A:son Kantele (born 1903), the daughter of Anders Andersson and his wife. He had three children: Kenneth (born 1913), Theresa (1914–1919), and Agneta (1916–2008).

== Awards and decorations ==
- (Sweden) Commander Grand Cross of the Order of the Polar Star (6 June 1947)

Diplomatic posts
Preceded by Hans Gustaf Beck-Friis	Envoy of Sweden to the United Kingdom; 1938–1947	Succeeded by Erik Boheman
