= Weymann Fabric Bodies =

Franco-British patented lightweight structural system for car and aircraft bodies

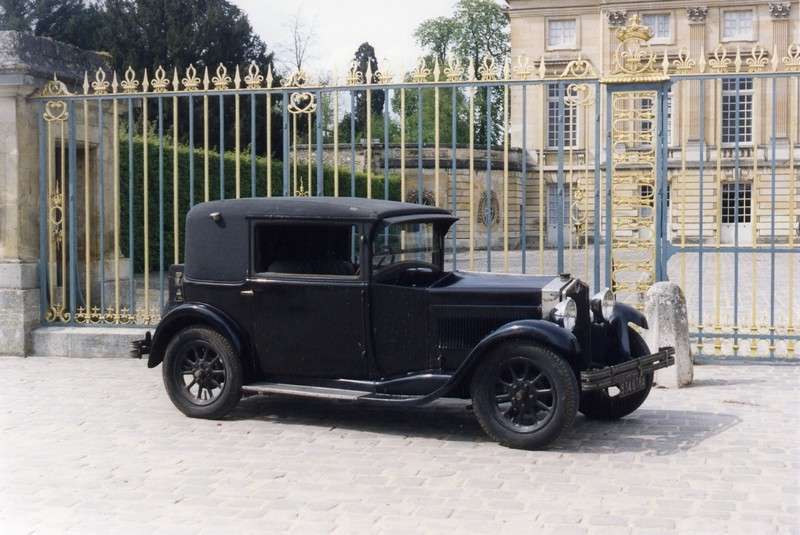
Fiat 509 with Weymann coachwork by Pourtout 1929

Weymann Fabric Bodies is a patented design system for fuselages for aircraft and superlight coachwork for motor vehicles. The system used a patent-jointed wood frame covered in fabric. It was popular on cars from the 1920s until the early 1930s as it reduced the usual squeaks and rattles of coachbuilt bodies by its use of flexible joints between body timbers.

The system when used on cars provided quieter travel, and improved performance because of the body's light weight; but gave little protection in the event of a serious accident, and without care a potentially short life, as the materials were prone to rot. Fabric provided a matt surface and the framework sharp corners. Later supporting metal corner-inserts were employed to smooth corners and the fabric could be finished with layer upon layer of hand-sanded paint, called Tôle Souple, giving the impression of polished metal.

Introduced to the market in 1921, Weymann's bodies fell out of popularity within a decade.

== Weymann body system ==
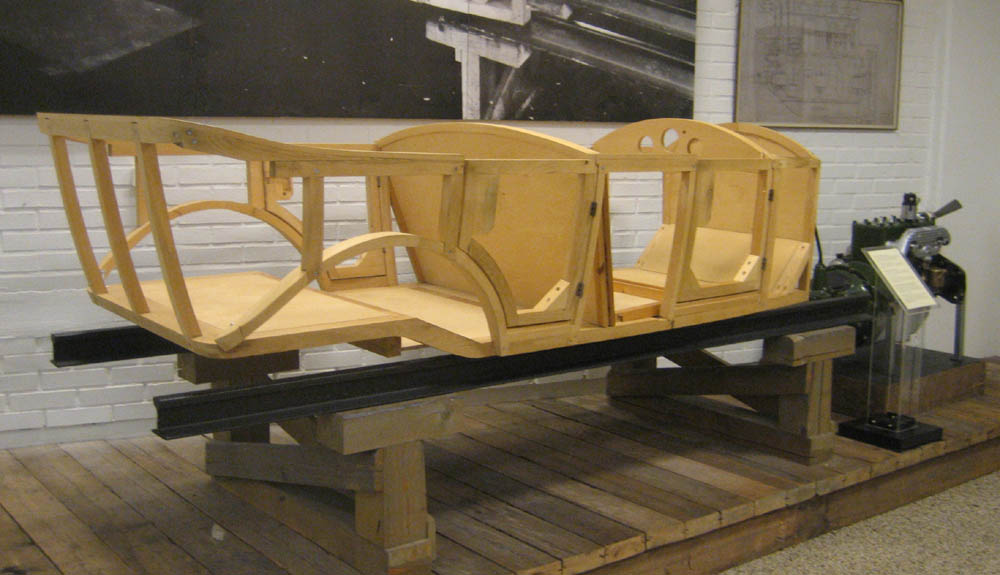
Conventional non-Weymann coachwork frame (Volvo ÖV 4)

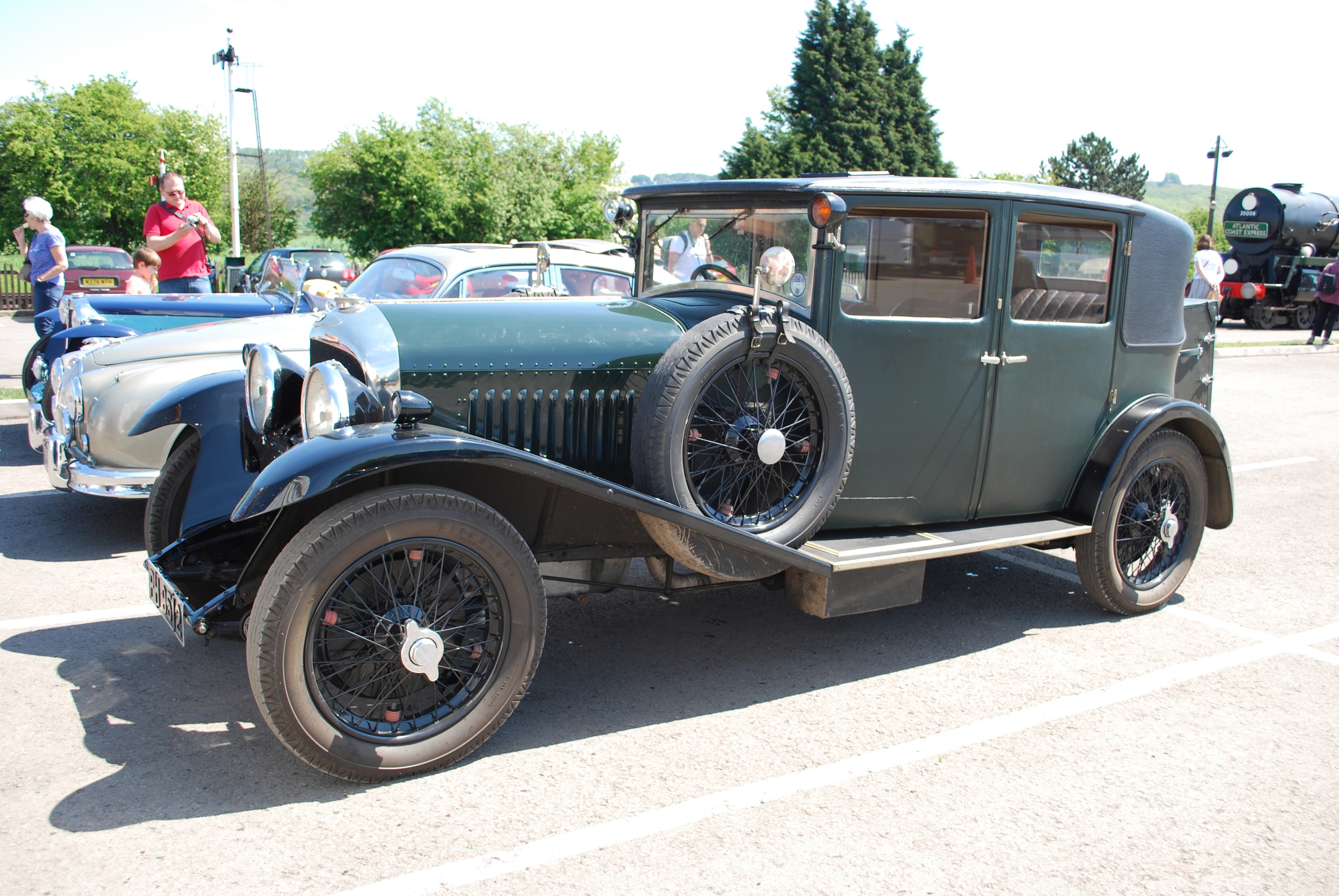
Gurney Nutting Weymann body Bentley 4½-litre May 1928

The Weymann system comprises an ultra-light wood framework with special metal joints so that timber does not touch timber. Small metal panels are inserted between the fabric and the framework to make rounded external corners. Straining wires are fitted to hold the doors in shape when they are stressed by acceleration or bumps. The frame is then covered with muslin over chicken wire with a thin layer of cotton batting used to span large open areas and over this a top layer of fabric, usually a pigmented synthetic leather, is placed. Any exposed joints in the fabric are covered with aluminium mouldings. The seats are fixed directly to the chassis.

Passengers were therefore in almost direct contact with the firmly mounted engine. Where the market permitted, some isolation was provided by luxuriously sprung passenger-seating, often topped with inflated pneumatic cushions. For the luxury market, it further encouraged the development of inherently smoother multi-cylinder engines in place of sixes and eights and, too late for Weymann, the introduction of flexible engine mounts and better chassis suspension systems than primitive leaf springs.

=== Advantages when compared with conventional coachbuilt construction ===
J Gurney Nutting of Chelsea, London, assured purchasers of his Weymann bodies, including The Prince of Wales:

- Absolute silence
- As durable as any other body
- Withstands rough roads and speed
- No squeaks, rattles, or draughts
- Absence of drumming and rumbling
- Lightness increases operating economy and speed
- Most luxurious
- Perfect comfort in any weather
- Less expensive than coachbuilt composite bodies of similar quality
- Easily cared for
- Easy to wash and clean
- Easily repaired in case of accident

== Designer and patent holder ==
The system was invented by Charles Weymann (1889–1976). An early portrait may be seen in the archives of FLIGHT magazine.

Weymann's Paris coachbuilding business was located at Carrossier Weymann, 20 rue Troyon, Paris and their Bugatti, Rolls-Royce, Hispano-Suiza, etc. bodied limousines and cars bore the label Les Carrosseries C. T. Weymann, 18-20 rue Troyon, Paris.

== Daimler Construction Z ==
While Daimler had always built their own bodies, they also provided a large number of chassis to external coach builders to suit customers. In the second quarter of 1924 Daimler began building Weymann flexible framed fabric bodies for their "natural silence, the entire absence of drumming and all those attributes which make for comfortable long-distance touring with a minimum of fatigue". Seats were Dryad basket-chairs of wicker button-quilted in Bedford cord. Daimler chose to name its Weymann-type bodies Construction Z.

== Coachbuilder licensees ==
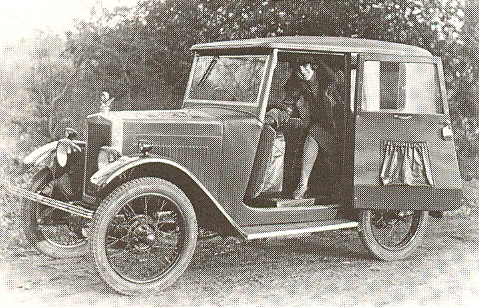
Morris Minor 1928

The licensing company which provided customers with permits to make Weymann fabric bodies for fitting to rolling chassis was based in Paris. Weymann claimed 123 licensees of his patents and that he received payment for around 70,000 bodies.

Licensed manufacturers included:

- Weymann Motor Bodies limited, founded in England in 1922 with the first licences issued in 1923 to, amongst others, the Rover Company. In 1925 a move was made into actual body production as well as licensing and the Cunard coachbuilding company based in Putney, South London, was purchased. The enterprise was a success and a move was made to larger premises at what had been the Blériot aircraft factory, Addlestone near Weybridge, Surrey, England. By 1930 the company had turned its attention to bus body construction and in 1932 became part of the Metro Cammell Weymann organisation.
- Weymann American Body Company of Indianapolis, USA
- Carrozzeria Touring, Milan, Lombardy, Italy, and its own development, Superleggera. See detail in Wikipedia en français

=== English licensees 1928 ===
From a joint advertisement by the following Makers of Genuine Weymann bodies, placed by Weymann Motor Bodies (1925) Limited, 47 Pall Mall, London, SW1

Horace Adams, Newcastle upon Tyne	T H Gill & Son, W1	Mulliners, Birmingham
William Arnold, Manchester	H A Hamshaw, Leicester	Arthur Mulliner, Northampton
J Blake & Co, Liverpool	Hancock & Warman, Coventry	K J Newns, Thames Ditton
Cadogan Motors, Fulham	Thomas Harrington, Brighton	J Gurney Nutting & Co, Chelsea
Carlton Carriage Co, Willesden	Kelly Davies Co, Manchester	Park Ward, Willesden
Caversham Motors, Reading	W H Knibbs & Sons, Manchester	F W Plaxton Smith & Bianchi, Scarborough
John Chalmers & Sons, Redhill	Lancefield Coachworks, W13	Rippon Bros, Huddersfield
Charlesworth Bodies, Coventry	Mann Egerton & Co, W1	Union Motor Car Co, SW1
Connaught Motor & Carriage, W1	Marshalsea Bros, Taunton	Martin Walter, Folkestone
Flewitt, Birmingham	E Maule & Son, Stockton-on-Tees	F J Williams, Cheltenham
John Fowler & Sons, Harrogate	Morgan & Co, Leighton Buzzard	G Wylder & Co, Kew Gardens
Freestone & Webb, Willesden	Motor Bodies & Engineering Co, N7	James Young & Co, Bromley Kent

== Gallery ==
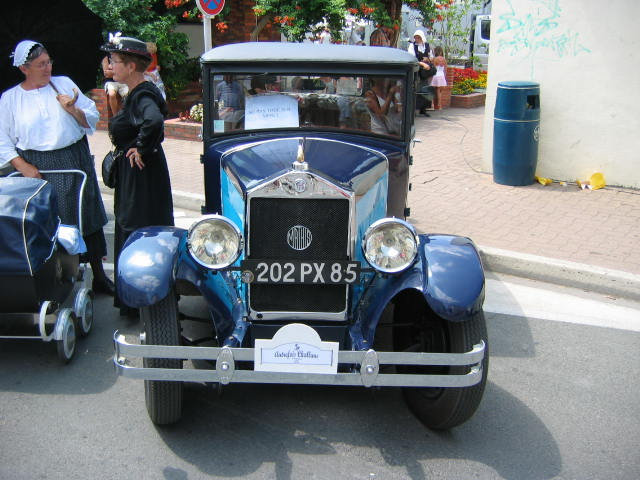
Mathis MY 1924

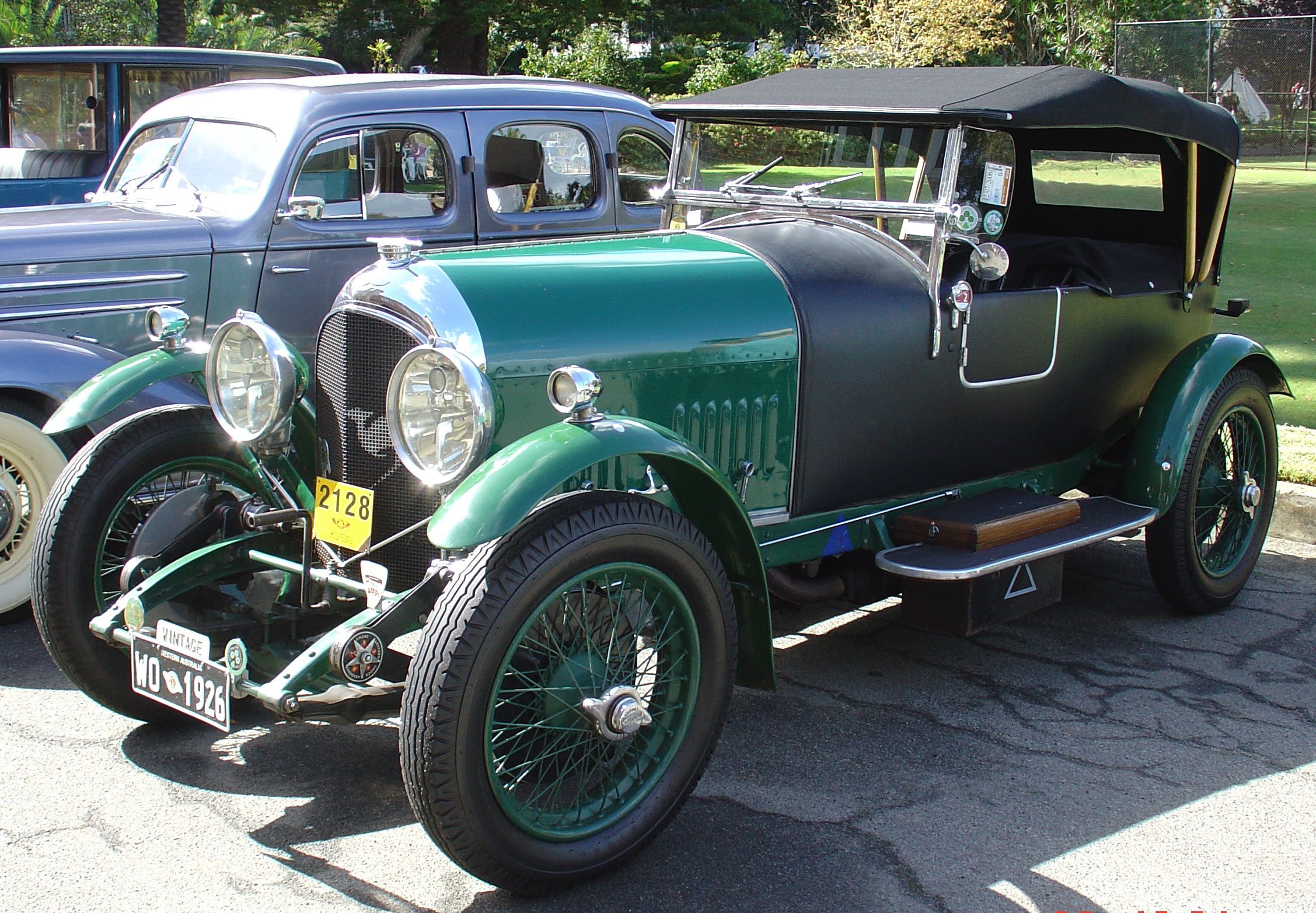
Bentley 3 Litre 1926

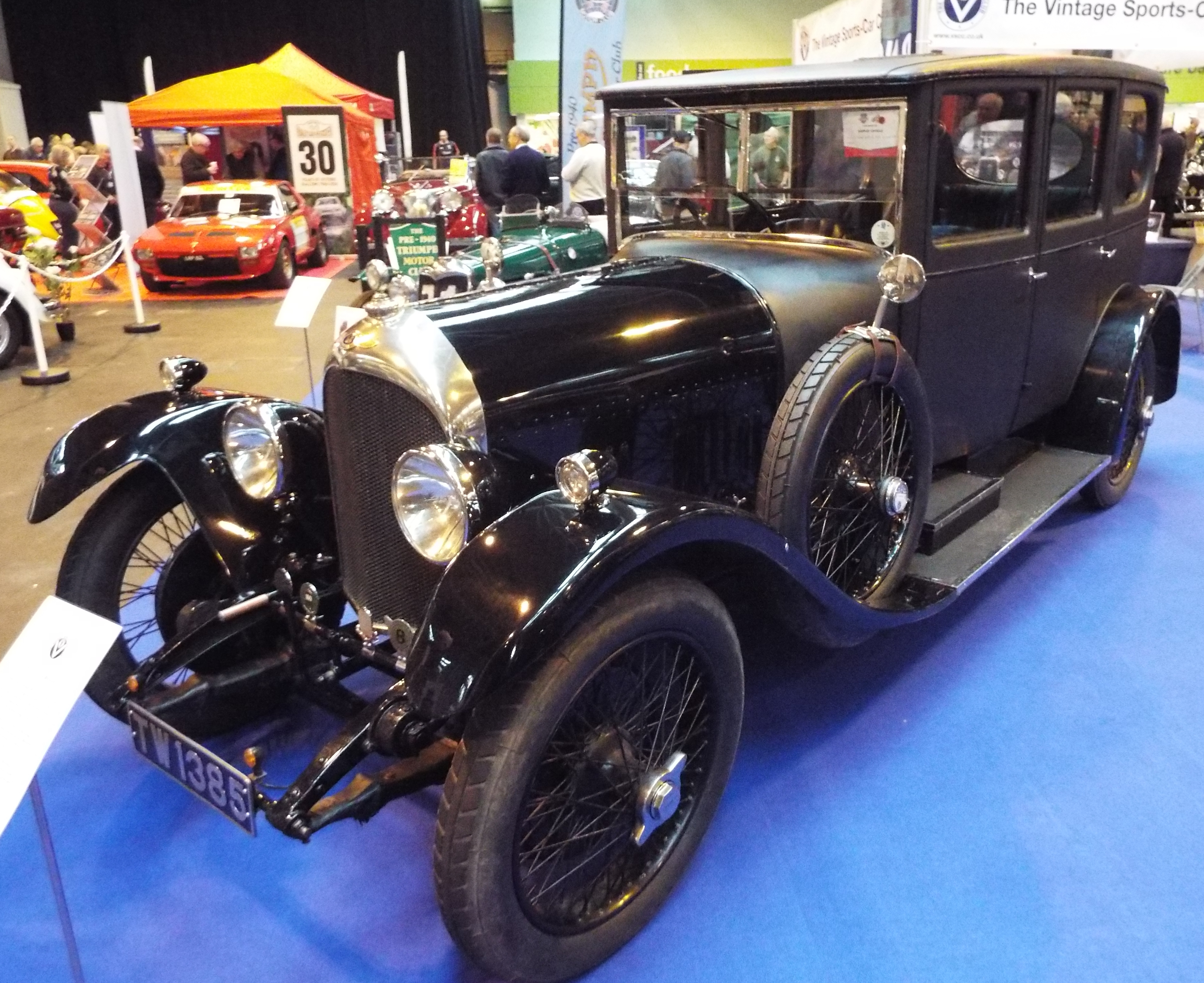
Bentley 3 Litre 1926

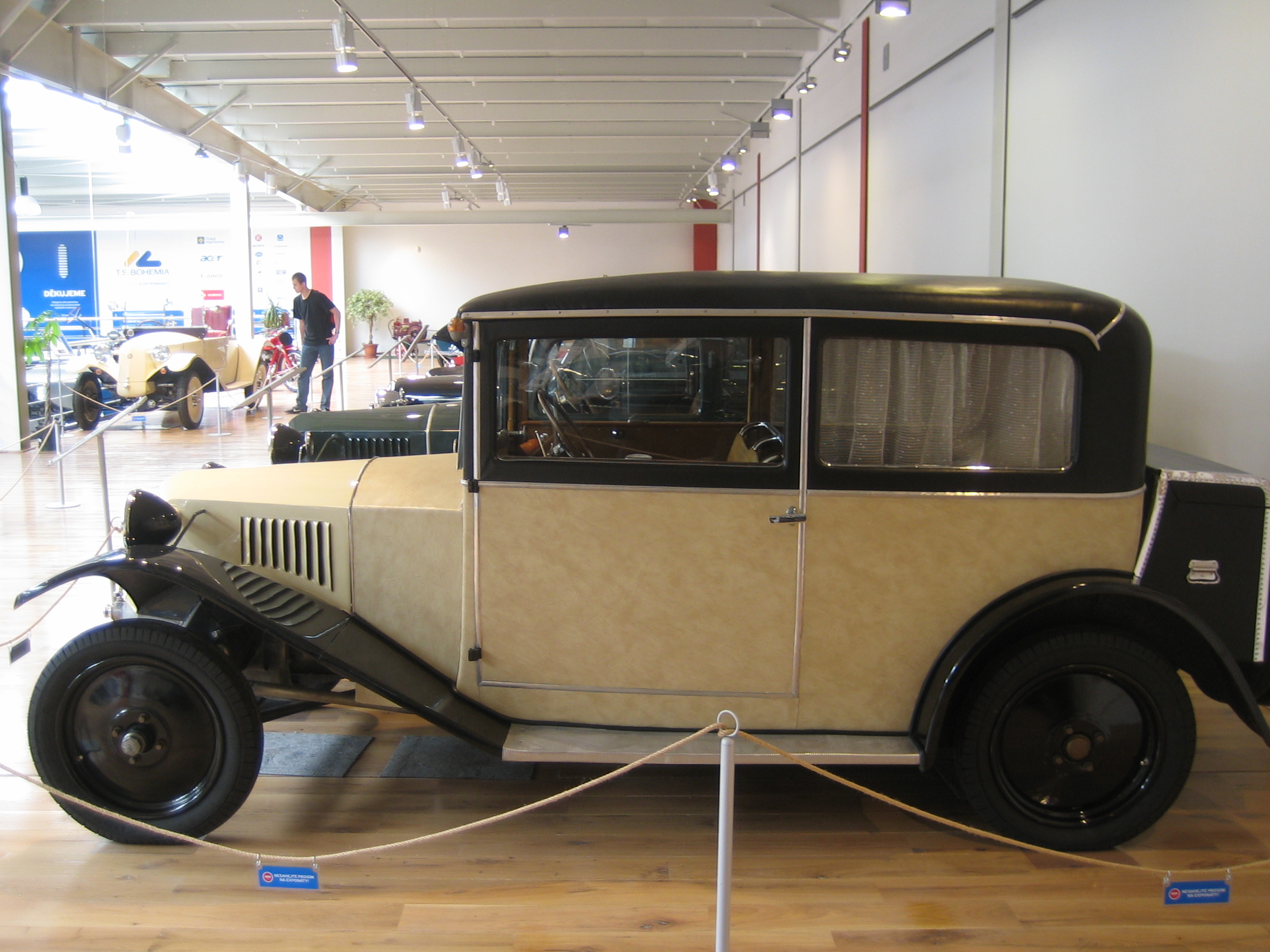
Tatra 12 produced 1926–1933

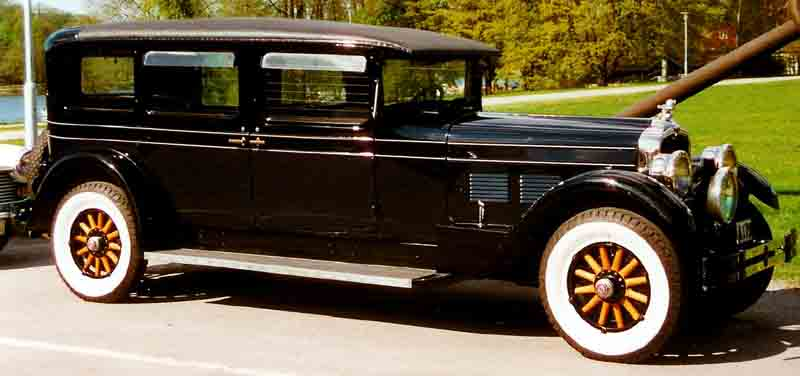
Stutz Vertical Eight AA 1927

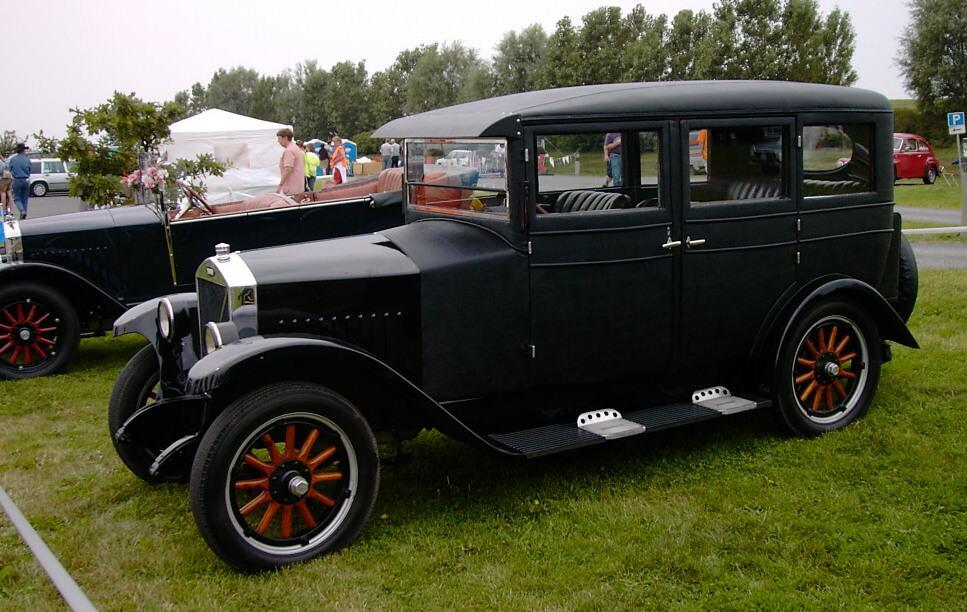
Volvo PV4 1928

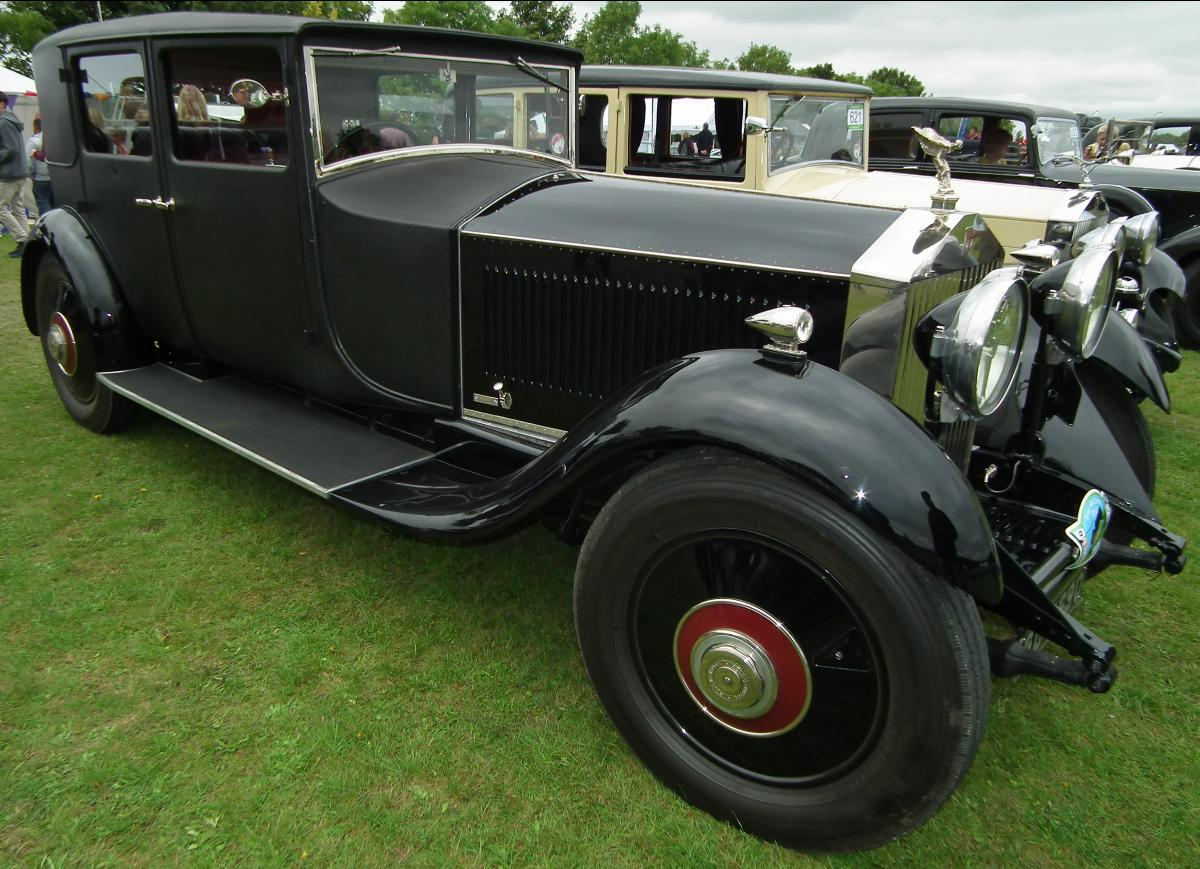
Rolls-Royce Phantom II 1929
by H. J. Mulliner & Co.

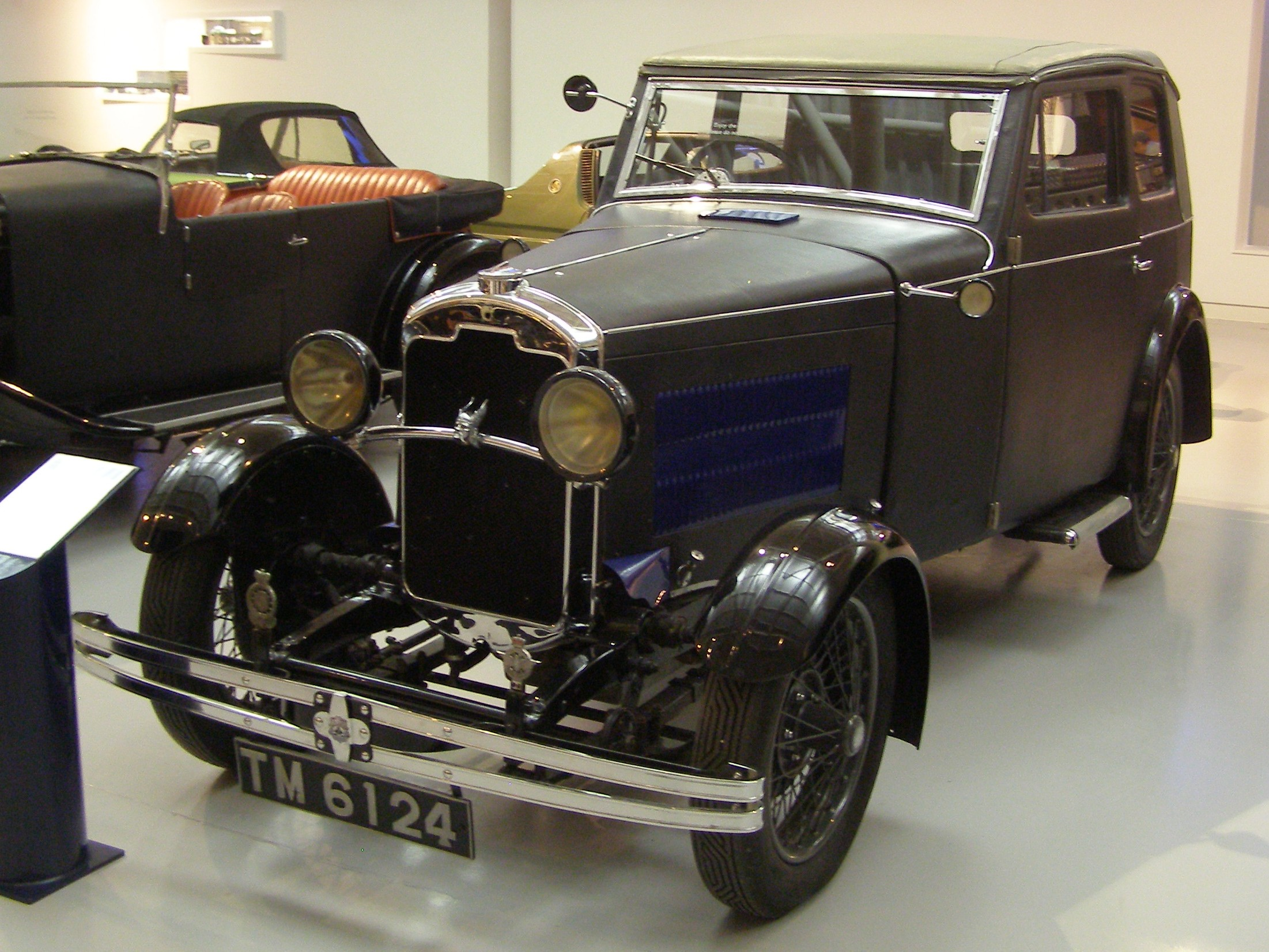
Rover Light Six "Blue Train" 1929

Sunbeam 16 1930

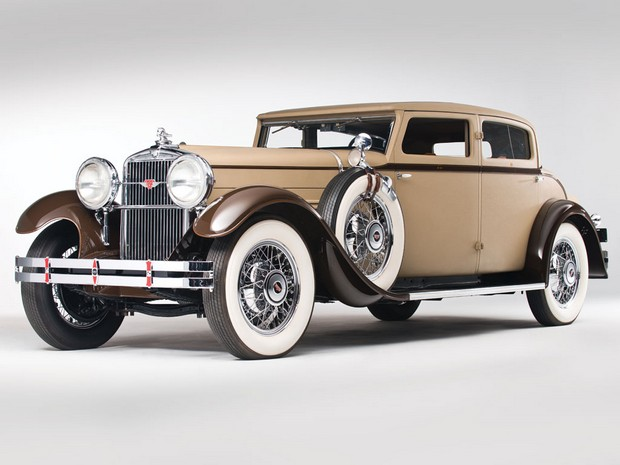
Stutz SV16 Monte Carlo 1930

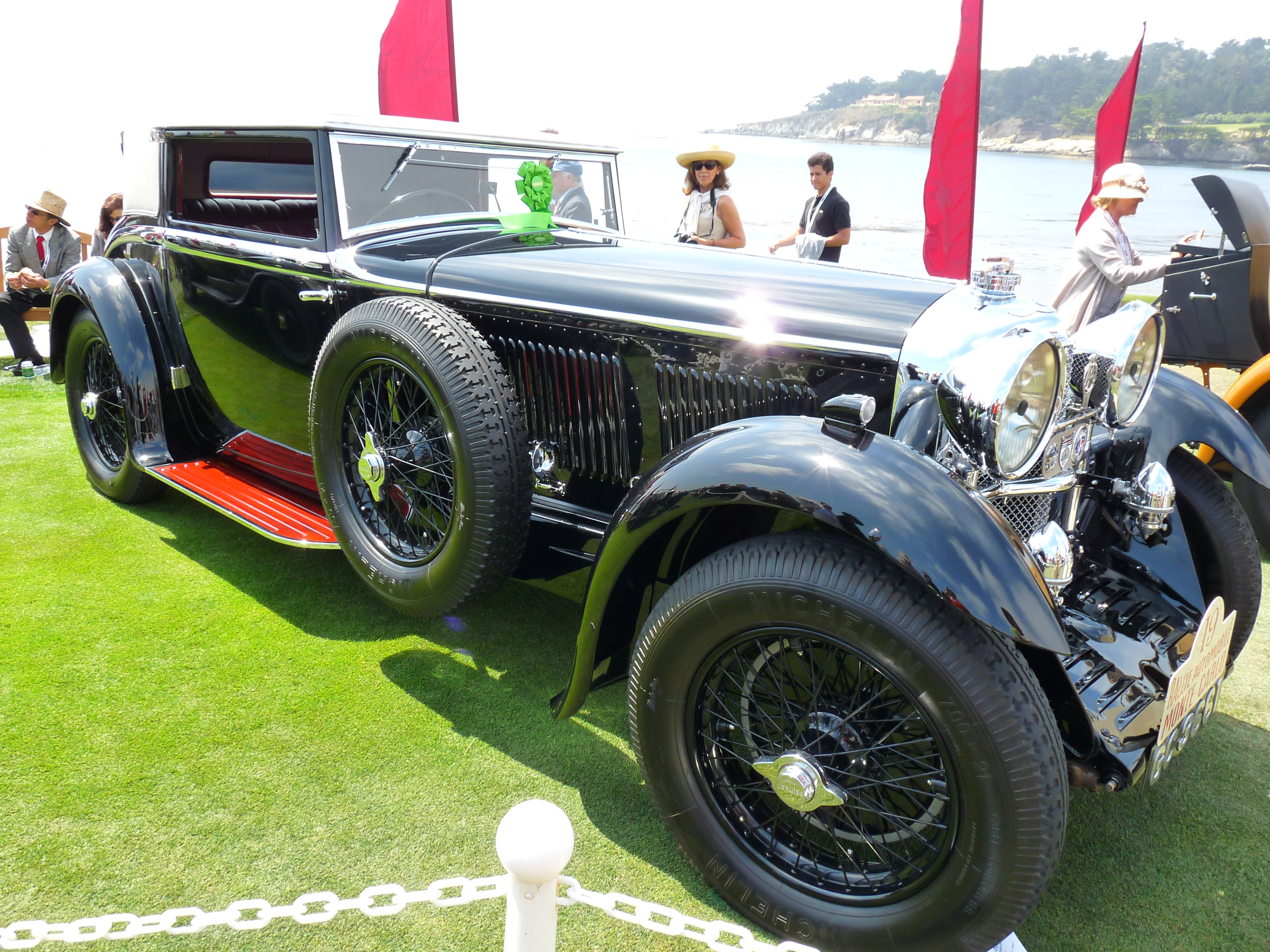
Bentley Speed Six 1930
with Tôle Souplé finish

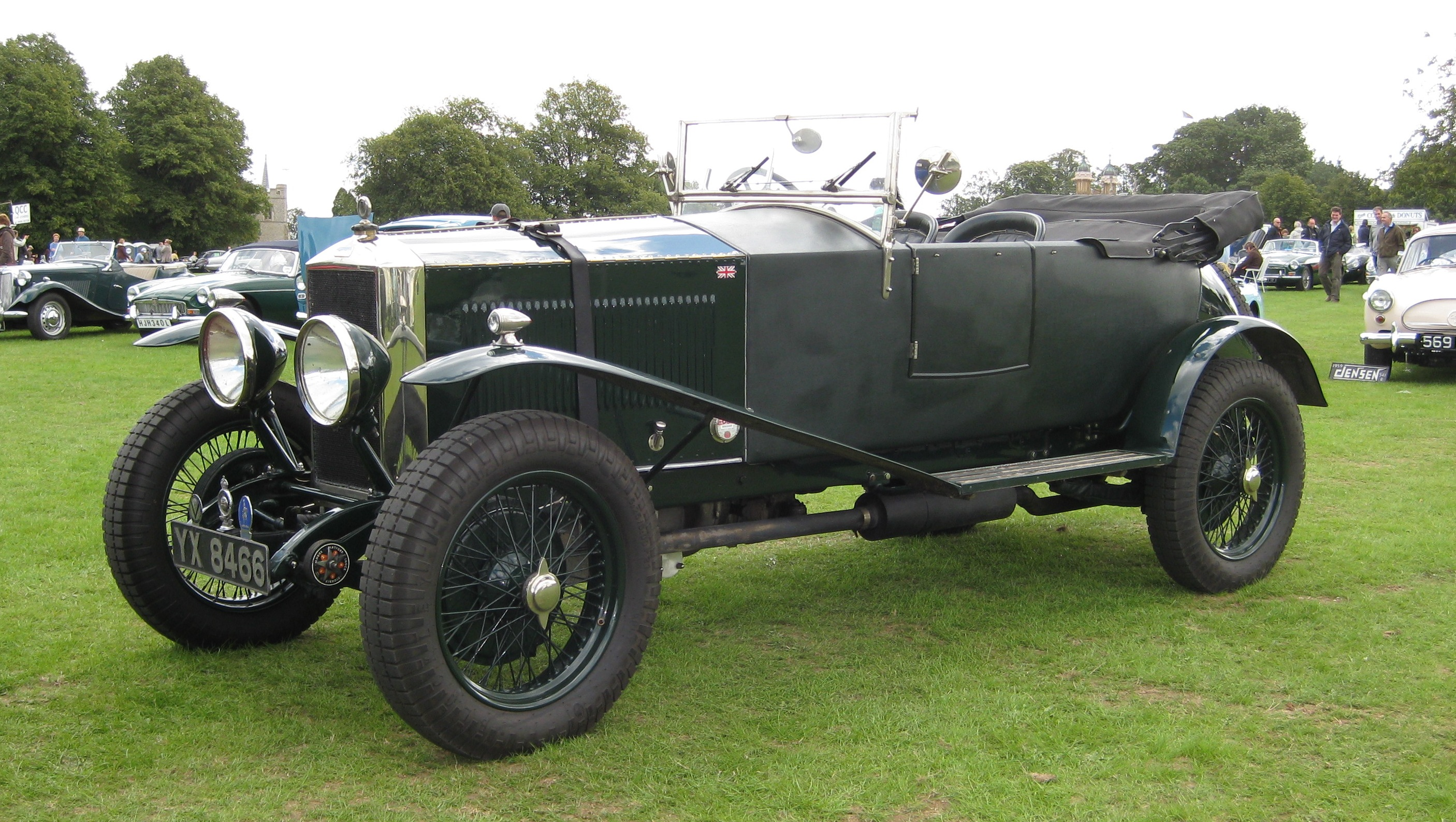
Invicta circa 1930

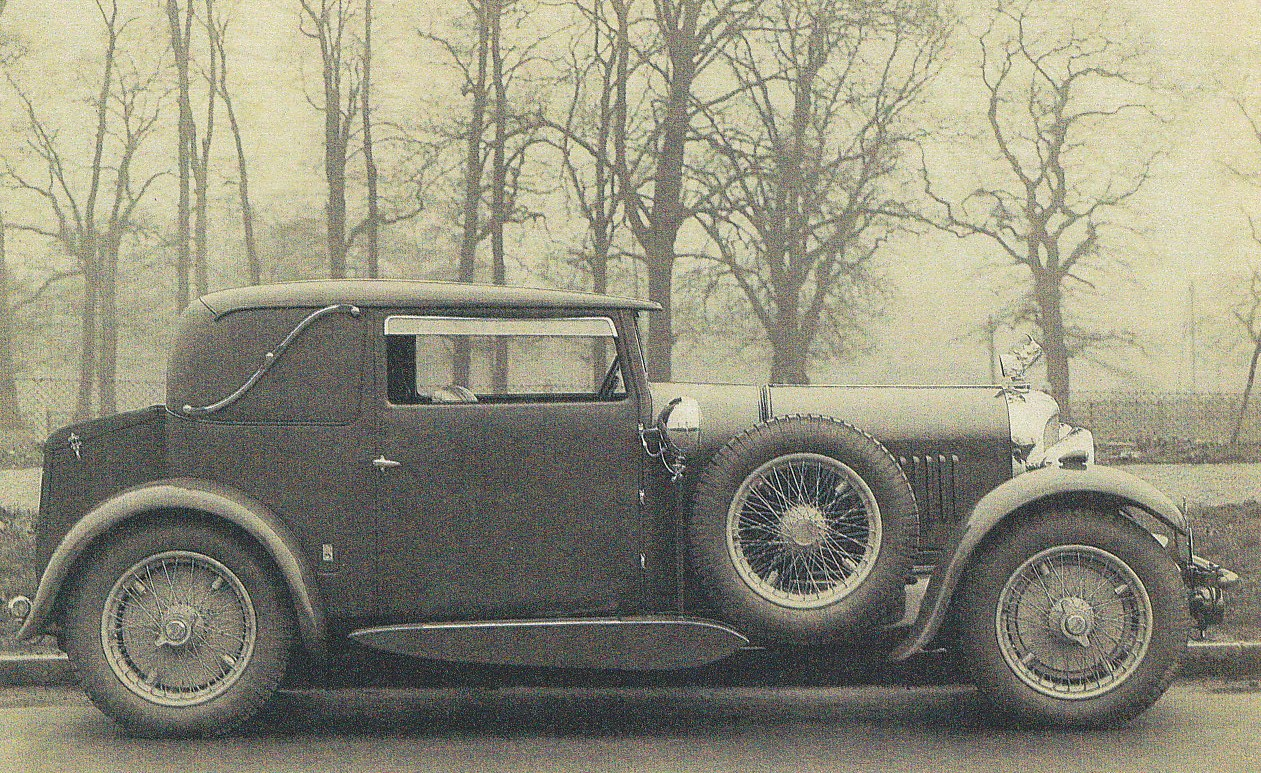
Bentley 4½-litre Supercharged 1930

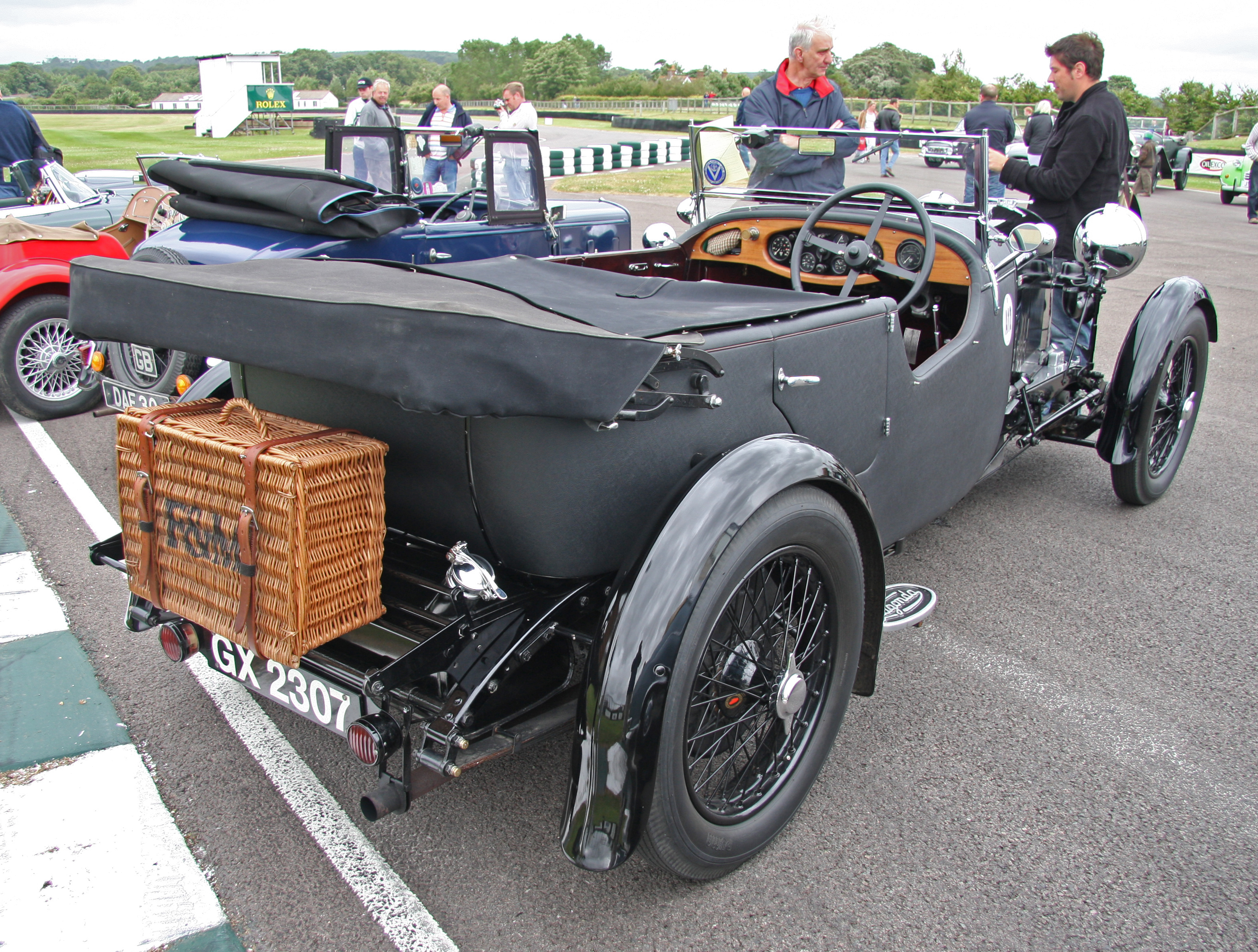
Lagonda 2-litre 1932

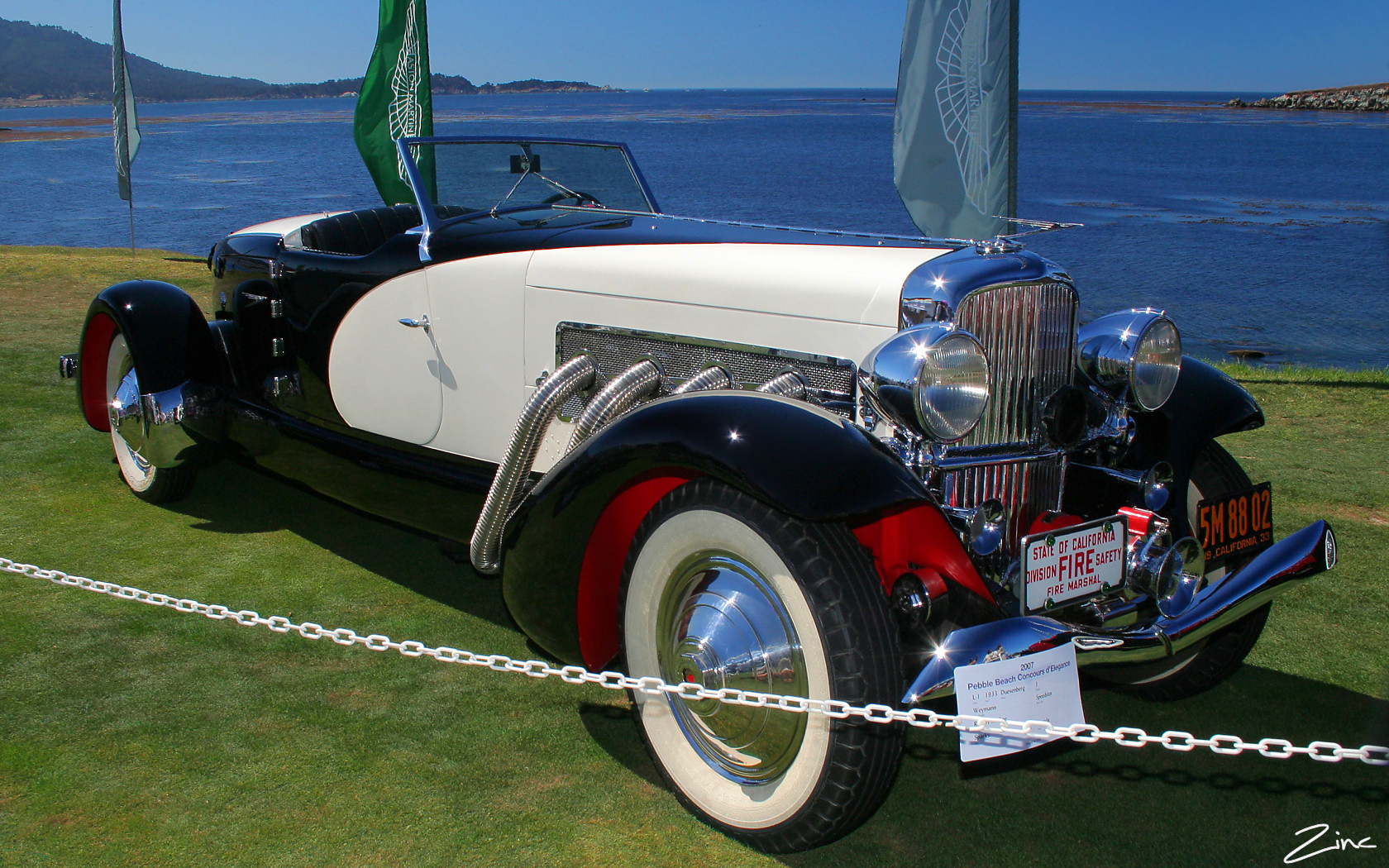
Duesenberg J Speedster 1933

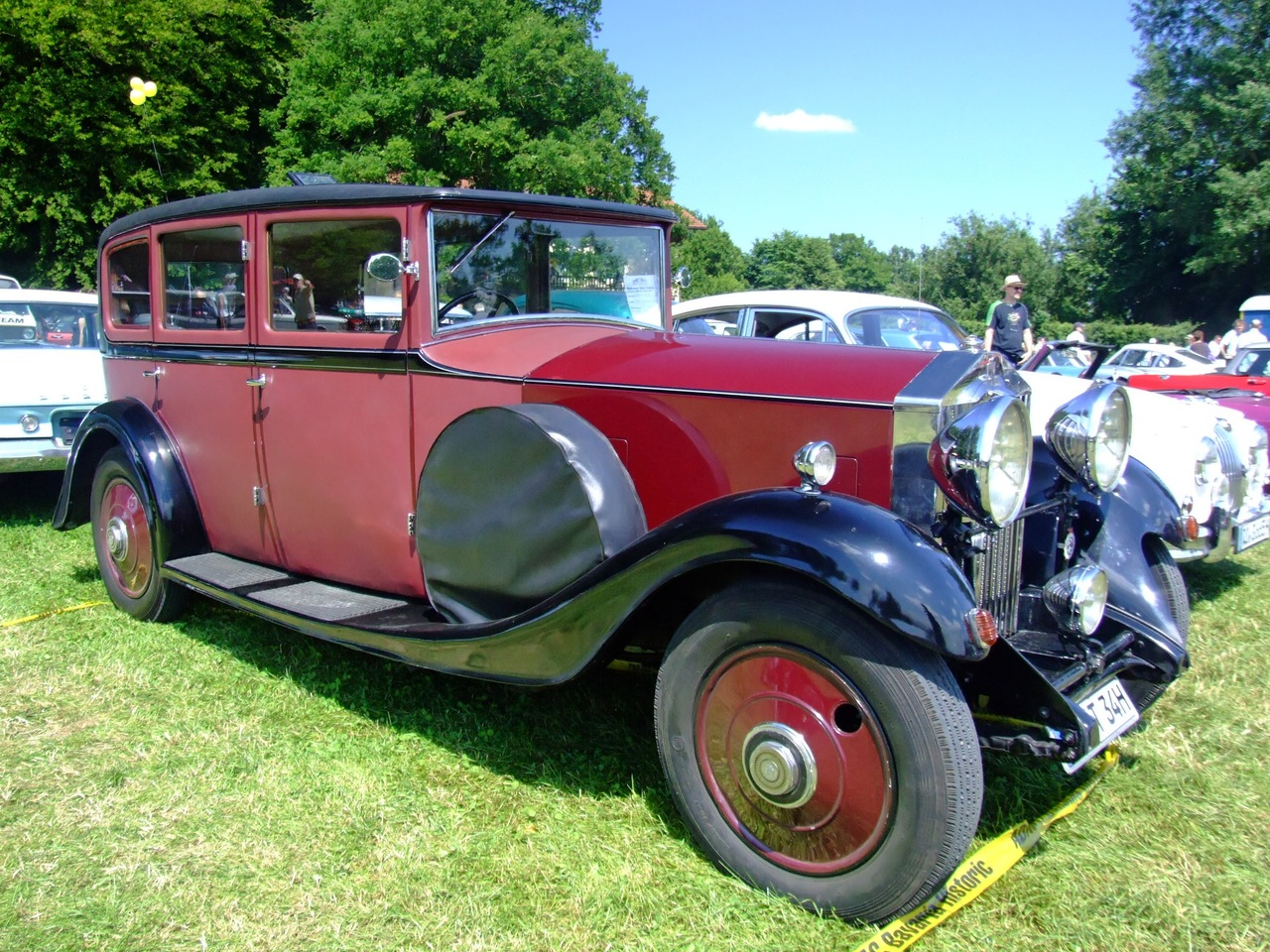
Rolls-Royce 20/25 1934

== See also ==
- Body-on-frame
- Spaceframe
- Monocoque
