= Gustaf Larson =

Swedish automotive engineer (1887–1968)

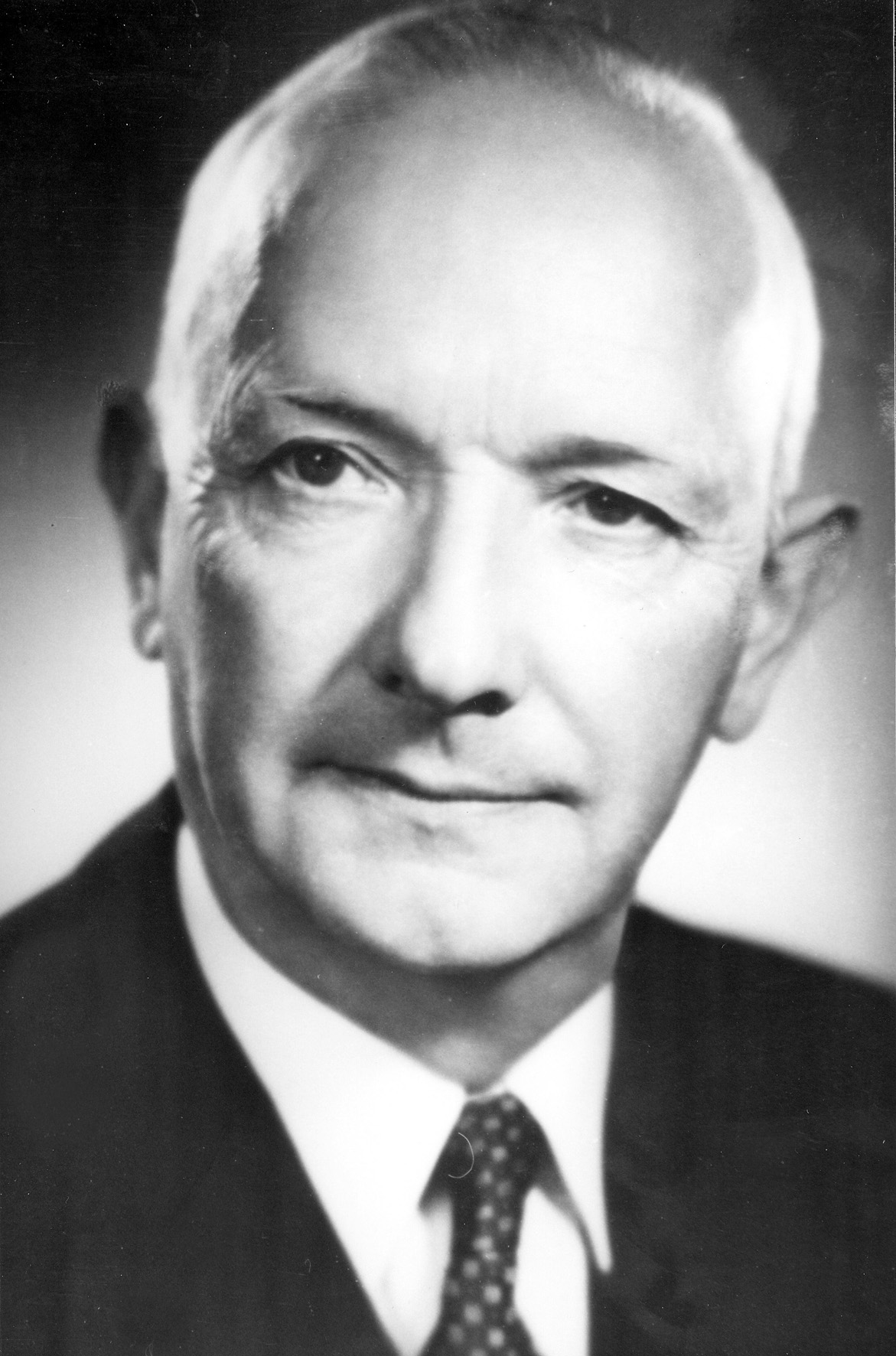
- Gustav Larson at Volvo AB (1950s).
- Born: Erik Gustaf Larson; 8 July 1887; Vintrosa, Sweden
- Died: 4 July 1968 (aged 80)
- Occupation(s): Business, Engineering
- Known for: co-founder of Volvo
- Spouse: Elin Octavia Fröberg
- Children: Erik, Anders, Gunnel, and Britt

Erik Gustaf Larson (8 July 1887 – 4 July 1968) was a Swedish automotive engineer and the co-founder of Volvo. He held a Master of Science (M.Sc.) degree in mechanical engineering from the Royal Institute of Technology in Stockholm.

== Biography ==
Larson was responsible for the technical design of the first Volvo model ÖV 4, introduced on 14 April 1927. He and Assar Gabrielsson founded Volvo. He was appointed vice president and technical manager for AB Volvo in Gothenburg, from the time the company was founded 1927. He worked for Volvo until his death in 1968.

== Volvo ==
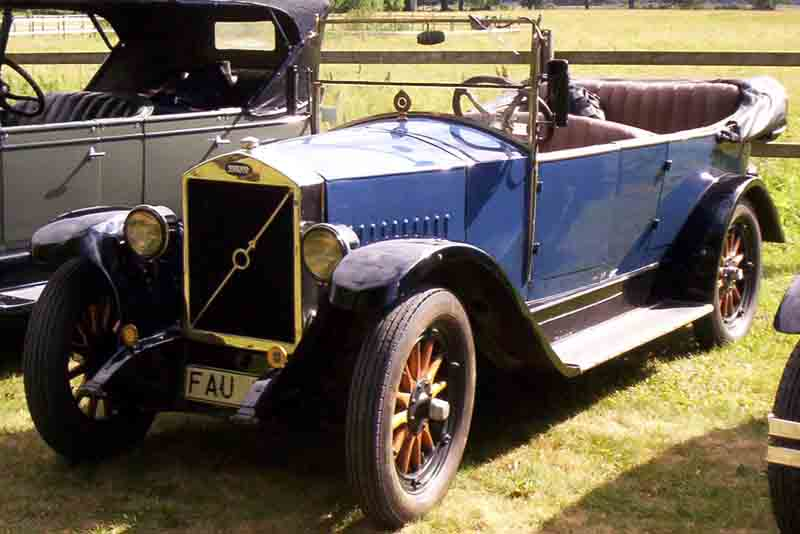
1928 Volvo ÖV 4 Touring model.

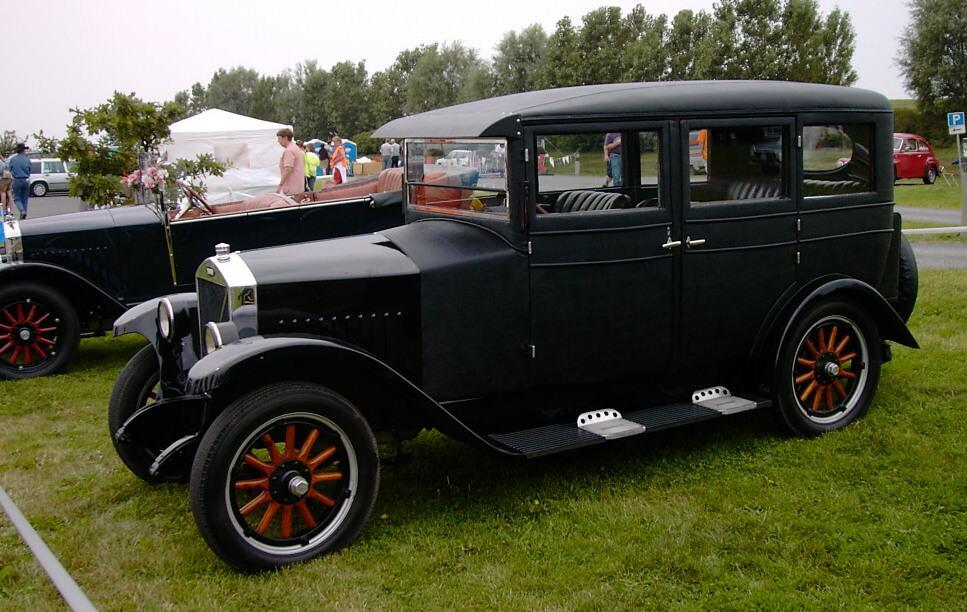
c. 1929 Volvo PV4, the covered version of ÖV4.

=== Invention and development ===
In June 1924, when Gustav Larson met his old friend Assar Gabrielsson in Skåne, Gabrielsson unveiled his plans to try to establish the manufacturing of a new Swedish automobile. Gustav Larson had worked for SKF between 1917 and 1919 but now worked for the company AB Galco in Stockholm. They made a verbal agreement in August 1924 at the Sturehof restaurant in Stockholm, then signed a written contract more than one year later, on 16 December 1925. In this contract Gustav was to carry out the engineering work for a new car, as well as an investment plan for a complete new manufacturing plant, but would only be rewarded for that work in case the project would turn out well. Well meant after at least 100 produced cars and in the case this was achieved before 1 January 1928. This famous contract shows that Assar Gabrielsson "owned" the project and that it was a high-risk project without any guarantees. Gabrielsson took the economic risks himself and Gustav, in the worst case, would have worked on the project without being rewarded, but still would have had his salary from AB Galco in Stockholm. Most of the capital that Gabrielsson intended to use for the project initially was actually extra sales commissions that he had saved from the time he was the managing director for the SKF subsidiary in Paris in 1921–22.

Gabrielsson had decided to build a test series of ten vehicles with his own financing and later present the car and an entire investment plan to SKF. The idea to build a pre-series of ten vehicles was most certainly related to the fact that no company would have given he and Larsen an offer for the components (engines, gearboxes, chassis components etc.) With less quantity they were certain that SKF would approve plans in due time. Engineering, documentation and investment planning was carried out exactly in the same way, as if it had been carried out by SKF in order to prepare for the set up of a new automobile company. Gabrielsson most certainly had the full support from the managing director of SKF, Mr. Björn Prytz, at that time, as long as his 'private' project did not interfere with his work as sales manager for SKF.

The first ten pre-series vehicles, model Volvo XC78, were designed and assembled in Stockholm at AB Galco under the supervision of Gustav Larson, at that time still having his other work at AB Galco to attend to. A "design-office", often called "Volvo's first design-office", was established in one room of Larson's private apartment at Rådmansgatan 59 in Stockholm. The design work started in the autumn of 1924 and a number of engineers were involved, among them engineer Jan G. Smith, that had returned from America in 1924, and later engineer Henry Westerberg. All the invoices related to the project was sent to Gabrielsson's private address at Kungsportsavenyn 32 in Gothenburg. In a lot of orders that Gustav Larsson made himself, he referred to Gabrielsson as a "guarantee" so that the deliveries would be paid by him personally. These details shows that the Volvo automobile project in the beginning was a true private project, not sponsored by SKF from an economic point of view.

The first prototype car was ready in June 1926. Larsen and Gabrielsson took it and drove themselves, on bumpy roads, down to SKF in Gothenburg to show the SKF-board and now present the final investment plan.

=== AB Volvo founded ===
At a board meeting held in Hofors, Sweden, on 10 August 1926, SKF decided to use the old subsidiary company Volvo AB, for the automobile project. AB Volvo, that was first registered in 1915 on the initiative of Björn Prytz, was originally set up to be used for a special series of ball bearings for the American market but it was never really used for this purpose. A small series of ball bearings stamped with Volvo was manufactured but it was never introduced on a larger scale.

A contract was signed on 12 August 1926 between SKF and Gabrielsson, stipulating that all ten prototype cars, engineering drawings, calculations etc. should be handed over to Volvo AB, and Gabrielsson in return would be refunded most of his private investments for the prototype cars. The contract was signed by Björn Prytz, managing director of SKF and Gabrielsson. Gustaf Larsson finally got paid for the initial engineering work with the ÖV4 according to the 'private' contract he and Gabrielsson had signed on 16 December 1925. That 1925 contract had stated that the automobile project may be sold to any company that would be interested, but they hoped that SKF would be the company to first offer.

Gustav Larson was appointed vice president and technical manager on 1 January 1927, and left his employment at AB Galco in Stockholm.

=== First production Volvo ===
On 14 April 1927, at about 10 p.m., the first series production model, the ÖV 4, left the newly established factory on Hisingen in Gothenburg.

The ten prototype cars that had been assembled in Stockholm were never sold, except for one that was sold to Volvo's photographer Sven Sjöstedt and was later donated to the Volvo Industrial Museum around 1930. However it was used as transportation vehicles within the manufacturing plant and as 'test benches' for new developed components during the first years.

=== Economic problems ===
The new company did not show any profit for the first couple of years and SKF invested more money to keep the company running. In 1928 the production of trucks began with the basic chassis components from ÖV4. The production of trucks was on a small scale, but the concept was successful from start.

However, in late 1929 SKF nearly sold the company to Charles Nash, president of Nash Motors in the United States. Björn Prytz and Gabrielsson managed to convince the SKF board to call the deal off, just one day before Charles Nash arrived by boat in Gothenburg. At the end of 1930 AB Volvo showed a small profit for the first time. In 1935 SKF came to the conclusion that Volvo now was ready to stand on its own feet. Volvo was introduced on the Stockholm stock exchange and SKF sold most of its shares. SKF could now concentrate on their core business, development and manufacturing of bearings, and still are, more than 100 years after the company was founded in 1907.

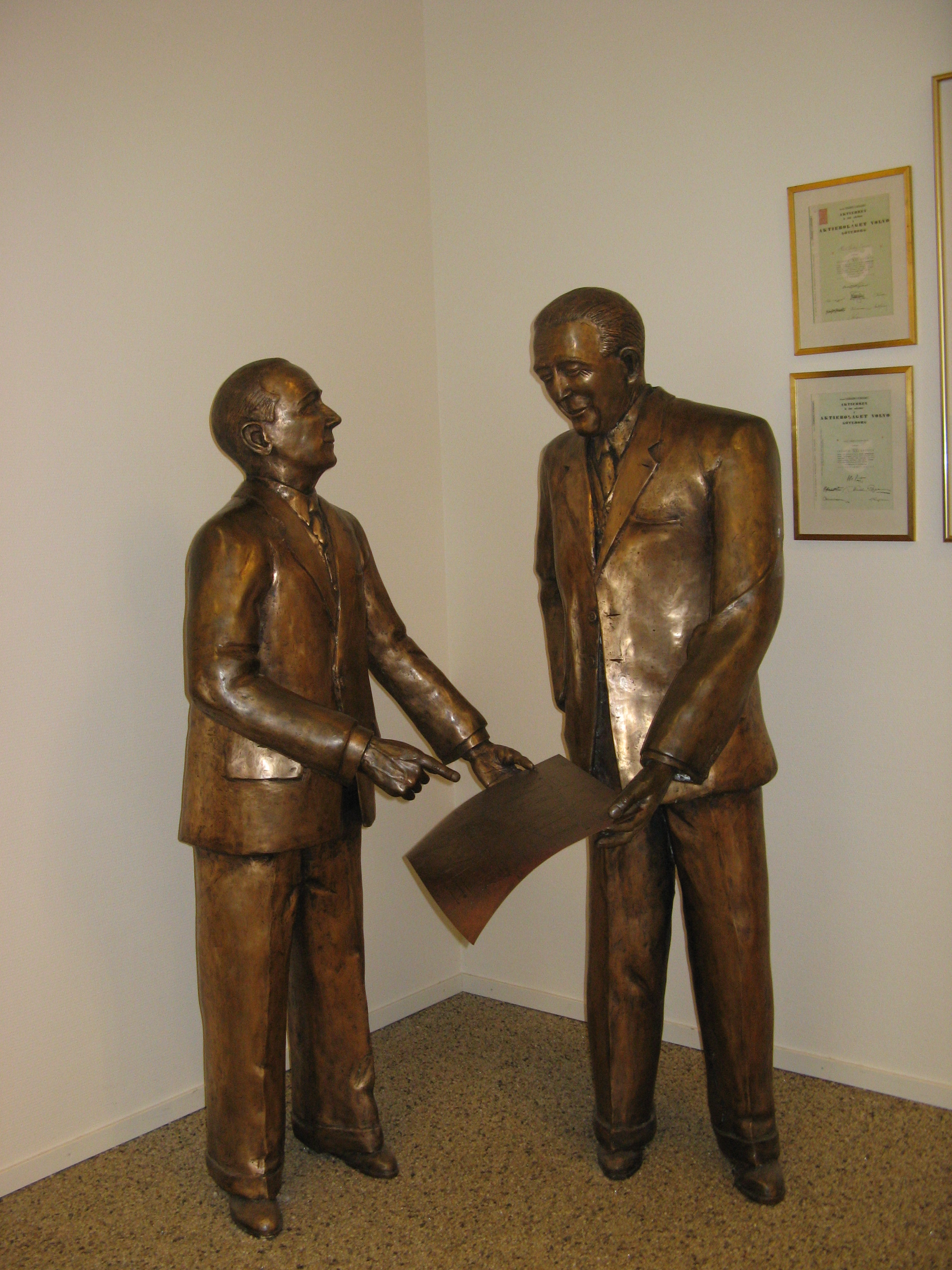
Bronze statue of founders Gustav Larson and Assar Gabrielsson in the Volvo Museum in Gothenburg.

=== Sales success ===
In 1941, the 50,000th Volvo car was delivered. It took ten years to produce the first 25,000 cars but only four years for the next 25,000 cars. In 1944–45, just after the end of the Second World War, the modern styled family car PV444, with a completely new design, was introduced and the car was a sales success. The company now stood on solid ground and the production of both cars and trucks continued to increase for the rest of Larsen's life.

== Family ==
Gustaf Larson was married to Elin Octavia Fröberg in 1918. They had four children: Erik, Anders, Gunnel, and Britt.

Gustaf Larson died on 4 July 1968, and is buried at the family tomb in Båstad, Sweden.

== See also ==
- Volvo Cars
- Volvo Museum — in Gothenburg—Göteborg.
