= Kohler SDMO =

French manufacturer of generators

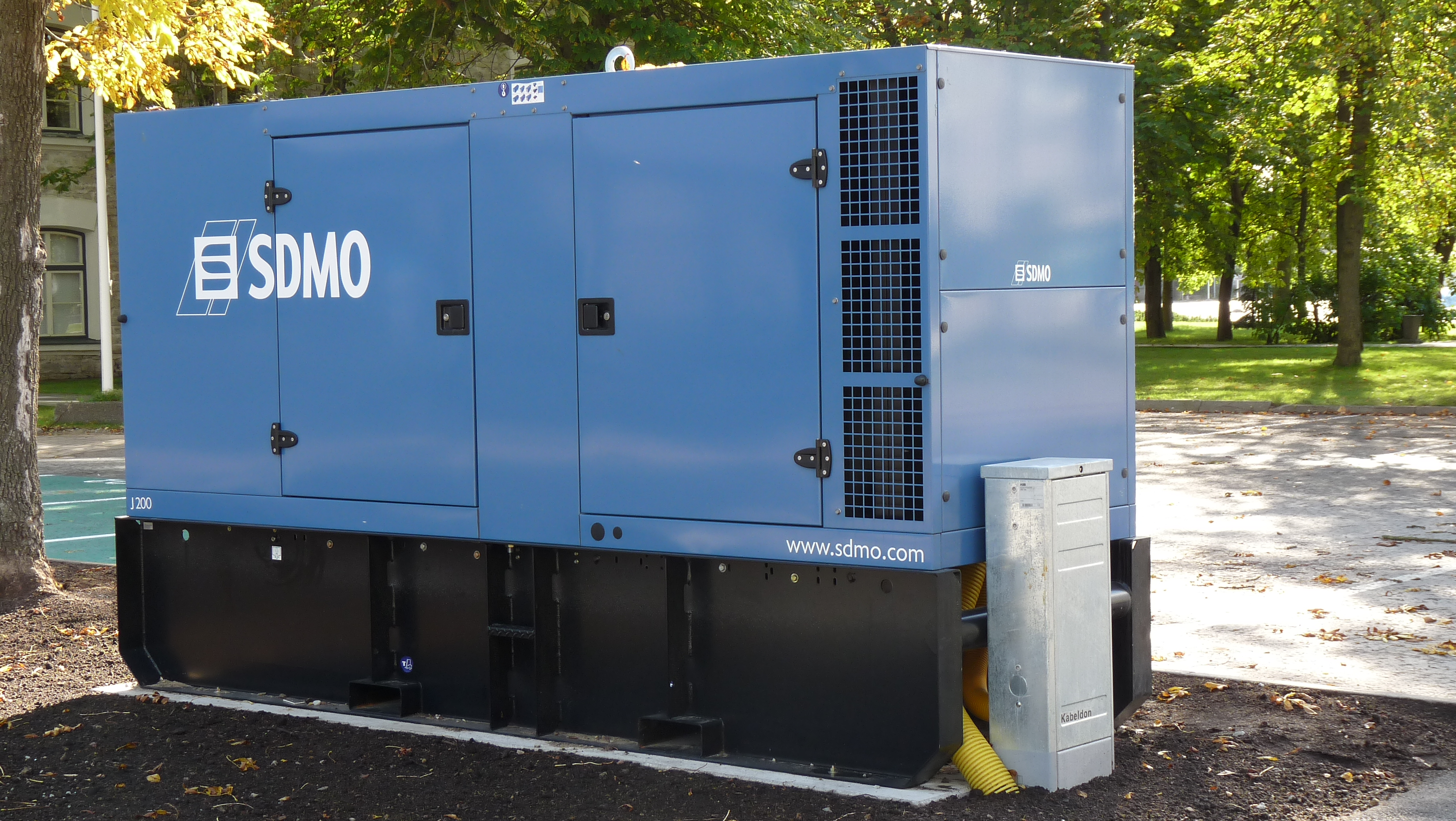
SDMO diesel-generator

Kohler SDMO is an industrial generator manufacturer which is a subsidiary of Kohler Company. It is based in Brest, specializing in the manufacturing of generating sets.

== Sites ==
SDMO has a total workforce of around 850 employees at all its sites, most of whom work in Brest, France and 70% of its sales are in the export market.

== History ==
- 1966: Creation of SDMO in Brest by the Meunier Group, a large local industrial family, managed by Guy Coisnon. At the time, SDMO (Société de Distribution des Moteurs de l’Ouest) specialised in the manufacture of marine engines.
- 1969, SDMO Industries moves towards the manufacture of generating sets. It gradually phases out the production of marine engines to focus on the design and manufacture of generating sets.
- From 1970 to 1985, SDMO sets up agencies nationwide, and signs its first contract in Africa.
- 1986, EDF Electricité de France introduces the EJP tariff. This step reduces the cost of electricity during peak demand, enabling SDMO to further establish its reputation in the French market and to significantly increase sales. It then widens its presence in Europe.
- In the early 1990s, SDMO sets up branches in Spain and England and then Singapore.
- 1995, the company sets up a new plant and offices of 15,000 m^{2} in Guipavas, near Brest.
- 2001: three subsidiaries are opened in Argentina, Brazil and the United-States and a representative office is set up in Algeria.
- 2003: a subsidiary is set up in Belgium
- 2005: a subsidiary is set up in Nigeria
- 2006: a representative office is set up in Dubai
- 2007: two new offices are set up in Johannesburg (South Africa) and Moscow (Russia).
- 2005, the Meunier family sells SDMO, as well as two other companies – SOREEL and BES – to the KOHLER Co. Group, an American family-owned multinational company, whose division Kohler Power System also designs and manufactures generating sets. Jean-Marie Soula is appointed as manager.
- 2006: KOHLER divides up the geographical marketing zones between SDMO and KPS to avoid any competition between the two brands. SDMO covers Europe, Africa, the Middle East and South America. KOHLER retains North America, Asia and Oceania.
- 2010: a subsidiary is set up in Germany and a 15,000 m^{2} expansion of the existing production site in Guipavas is under construction, due to open at the end of 2011.
- 2013: the group acquired a new subsidiary in Brazil - former name Maquigeral
- 2016 : SDMO is being renamed KOHLER SDMO, a change of positioning and now a manufacturer of its own engines. It is unveiling its new KD Series range, over 700 kVA, with KOHLER engines.

The company's head office is moving into new premises in the immediate vicinity of its Kergaradec plant.

== Business activity ==
The standard SDMO product range includes several different categories of generating sets, designed for a variety of target customers and applications:

- Low power generating sets, welding sets and motor pumps for the general public and professional builders.
- Standby generating sets for single dwellings and small multi-occupancy buildings.
- Standard configurable generating sets, medium to high power. They are used for continuous or standby power supply. They are mainly used for shopping centers, data centers, offshore platforms, telecommunications installations, etc.
- Generating sets for rental companies.

In addition to its standard product ranges, generating sets from 0.9 to 3,300 kW, SDMO provides services such as tailor-made genset design and mechanical or electrical training.
