= Korsberga, Hjo =

Village in Västra Götaland County, Sweden

Korsberga
- Location within Västra Götaland Location within Sweden
- Coordinates: 58°18′N 14°05′E
- Country: Sweden
- Province: Västergötland
- County: Västra Götaland County
- Municipality: Hjo Municipality

Area
  - Total: 0.39 km^{2} (0.15 sq mi)

Population (31 December 2010)
  - Total: 214
  - Density: 550/km^{2} (1,400/sq mi)
- Time zone: UTC+1 (CET)
  - Summer (DST): UTC+2 (CEST)

Korsberga is a locality situated in Hjo Municipality, Västra Götaland County, Sweden. It had 214 inhabitants in 2010.
