= Jan G. Smith =

Swedish engineer (1895–1966)

- Born: Jan Gustav Salomon Smith; 19 June 1895; Stockholm, Sweden
- Died: 30 April 1966 (aged 70); Stockholm, Sweden
- Education: KTH
- Occupation: Engineer
- Known for: Design work on the first Volvo automobile

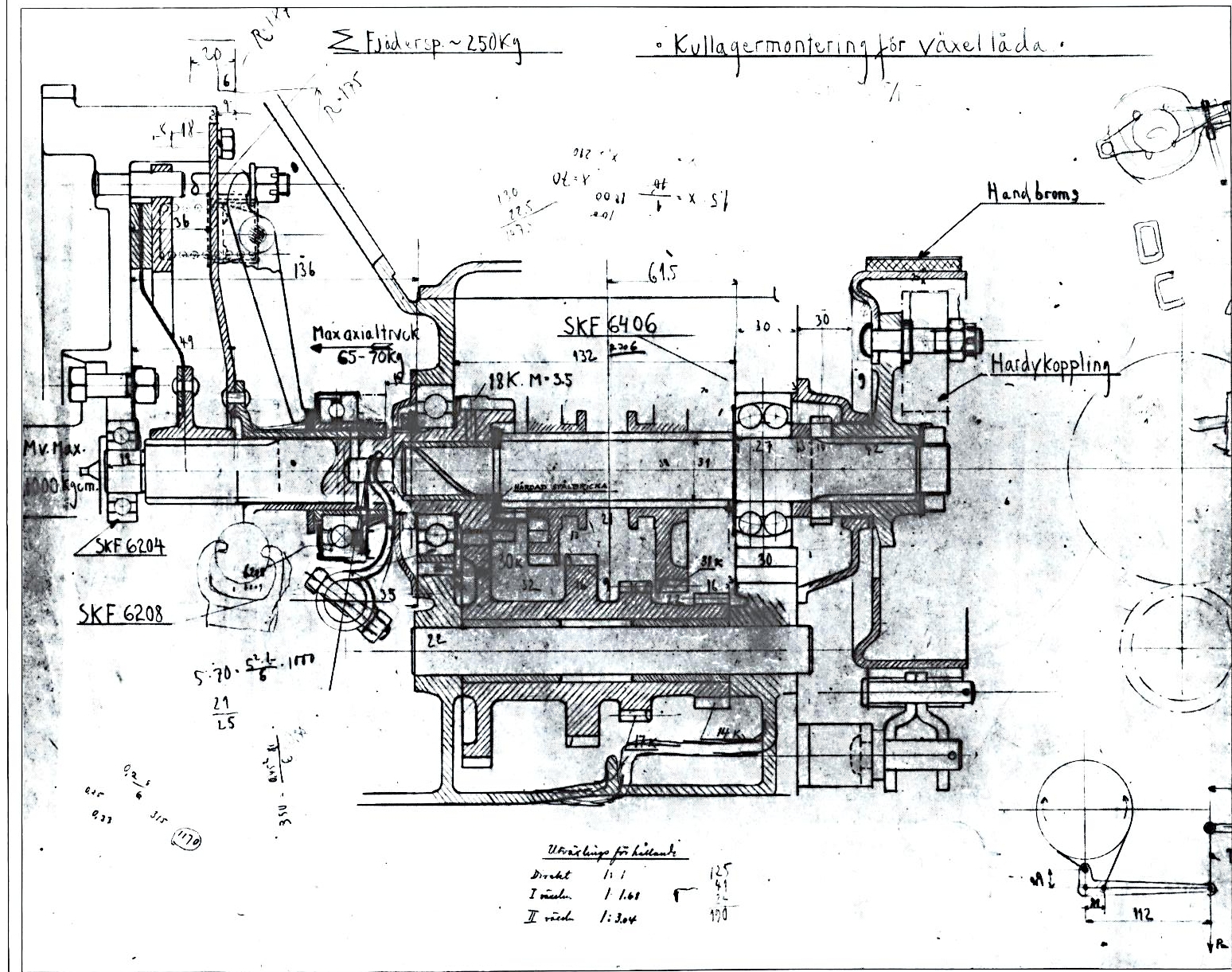
Gearbox (3-speed) sketch by Jan G. Smith for the first Volvo ÖV4 prototypes. Date 5 januari 1925.

Jan Gustav Salomon Smith, born 19 June 1895 in Stockholm, Sweden, died 30 April 1966 in Stockholm. In the literature he is known as Jan G. Smith. He was an engineer with a M.Sc. degree from KTH, Stockholm. For many years he worked in the American automobile industry and returned to Sweden in 1924. His experiences in the American automobile industry was probably the main reason why Gustav Larson asked him to join the team of engineers that started the design work for Volvo's first automobile, ÖV 4, in 1924. He worked for Gustav Larson in the temporary "design office" in Gustav Larsons private flat in Stockholm about a year. A lot of Jan G. Smith's original drawings for the Volvo ÖV4, the gearbox, the main chassis components and technical papers that he had collected in America in the form of a private design book, are saved in the archive of the National Museum of Science and Technology, Stockholm, Sweden. After the Volvo project he was employed by ASEA in Västerås and later worked for the same company in Stockholm. Jan was replaced in the Volvo project by engineer Henry Westerberg who stayed with Volvo as a designer until 1980 at the age of 79 when he retired.

Jan G. Smith was awarded a gold medal in 1929 by the Royal Swedish Academy of Engineering Sciences (IVA), together with Gustav Larson, "for their contribution to the national automobile industry in Sweden".
