= Volvo ÖV 4 =

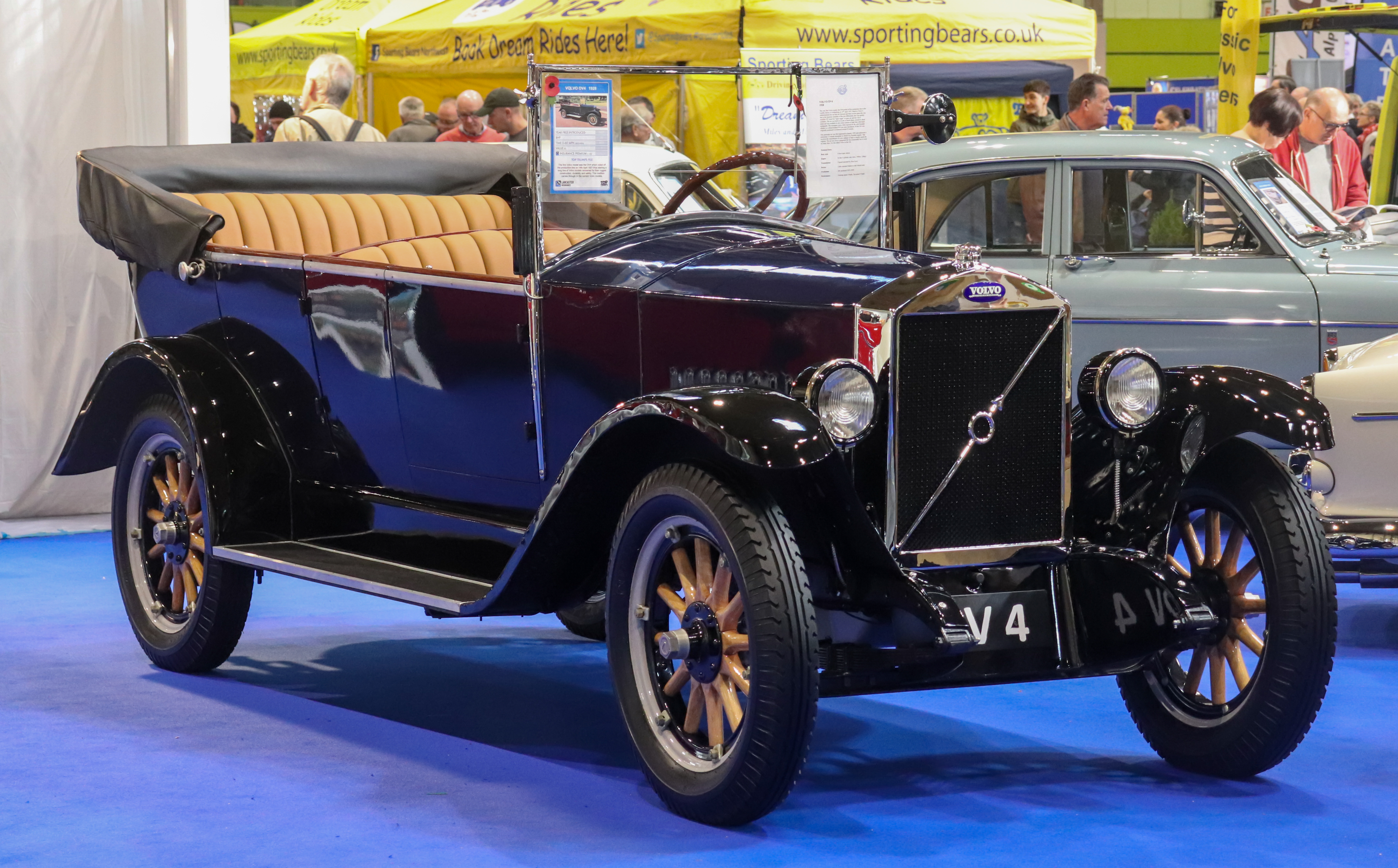

Overview
- Manufacturer: Volvo Personvagnar
- Production: 1927–1929; 302 produced (ÖV 4); 694 produced (PV 4); 996 total produced
- Assembly: Sweden: Lundby, Gothenburg
- Designer: Helmer MasOlle (bodywork); Jan G. Smith (engineering)

Body and chassis
- Body style: 4-door tourer (ÖV 4); 4-door sedan (PV 4); 2-door pickup (ÖV 4 TV)

Powertrain
- Engine: 1.9 L I4
- Transmission: 3-speed manual

Dimensions
- Wheelbase: 2,850 mm (112 in)
- Curb weight: 1,170 kg (2,579 lb)

Chronology
- Successor: Volvo PV650 Series

The Volvo ÖV 4 was the first car built by Volvo. The designation ÖV 4 stands for "Öppen Vagn 4 cylindrar" in Swedish, which means Open Carriage, 4 cylinders. The model ÖV 4 has later often been referred to as "Jakob" but that was just a name for one of the 10 pre-series ÖV 4 that was ready on 25 July 1926, Jakob's name day. All 10 prototypes were assembled in Stockholm at the company AB Galco, Hälsingegatan 41 where Gustaf Larson worked at that time. Only one of the 10 pre-series cars manufactured during 1926 was saved for posterity and is housed at the Volvo Museum in Gothenburg, Sweden.

== History ==
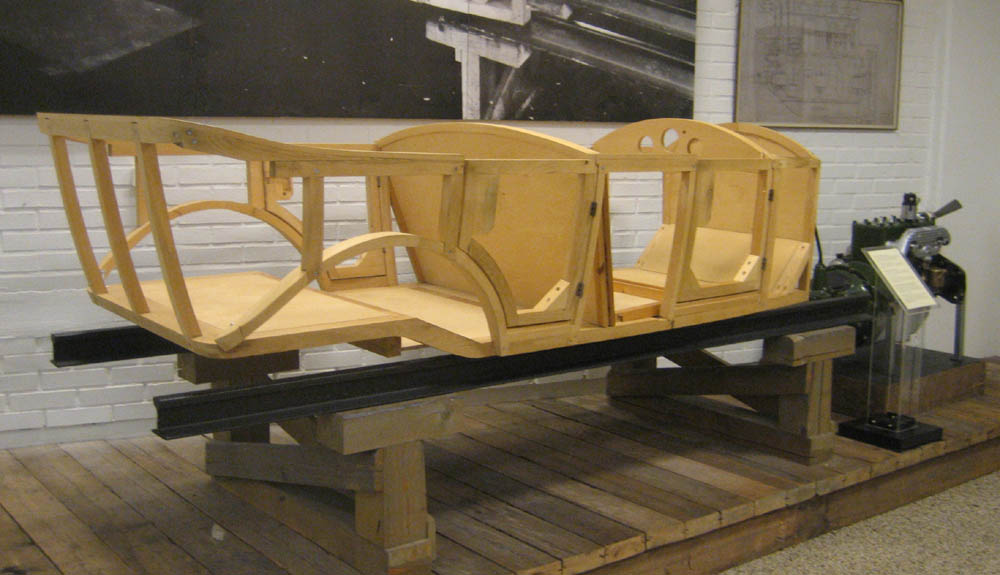
Replica of body frame

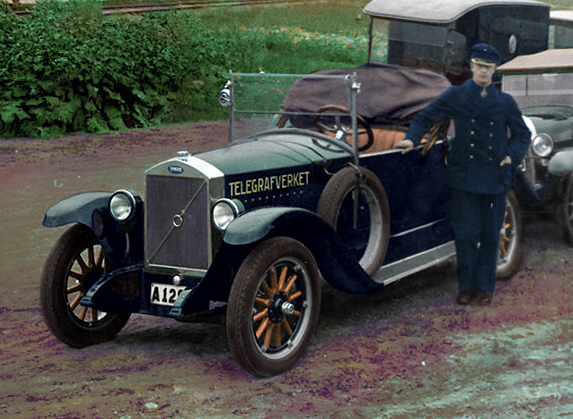
One of about 70 Volvo ÖV 4 TV light trucks made

The engine was designed by Gustav Larson and its main chassis components by Jan G. Smith, a designer who had worked many years in the American automobile industry and returned to Sweden in 1924. Many of Smith's original drawings for the ÖV4 and other technical papers that he collected in America are saved in the archive of the National Museum of Science and Technology in Stockholm, Sweden.

When the first series produced ÖV4 was about to drive out of the factory and engineer Eric Carlberg put it into first gear, the car went backwards, where the car was actually in reverse gear. The explanation was that the differential gear in the rear axle had been fitted incorrectly. This mistake delayed the introduction by one day and the official introduction day for the ÖV4 was then adjusted to 14 April 1927, the day AB Volvo officially says the automobile company Volvo was "born"— this is from a marketing point of view. The company as an automobile company was born as a subsidiary company to SKF on 10 August 1926.

== Models ==
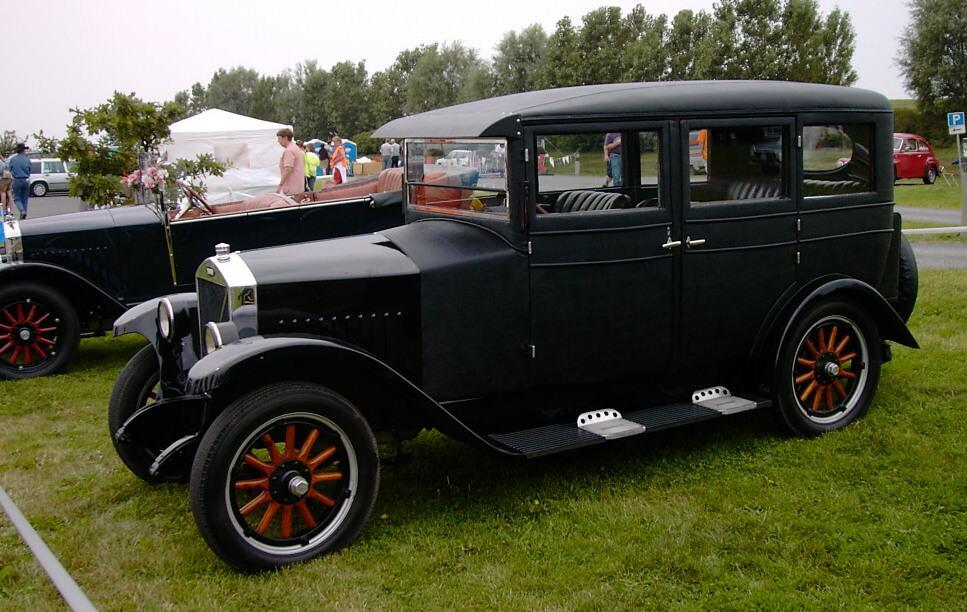
Volvo PV 4, the covered version of ÖV 4. This is the original design which was soon revised

The cabriolet was not very successful in the Swedish climate; the covered version, PV 4, was introduced in the summer of 1927. This had a Weymann body and the original design was considered rather ungainly. Helmer MasOlle, who had been inspired by his personal Voisin C5 when he designed the original ÖV 4, was reportedly furious about the PV 4 and would not be associated with it. By 1928, a more balanced design was introduced, with a longer bonnet and thinner pillars. The oval rear window of the original PV 4 was gradually replaced by a rectangular unit.

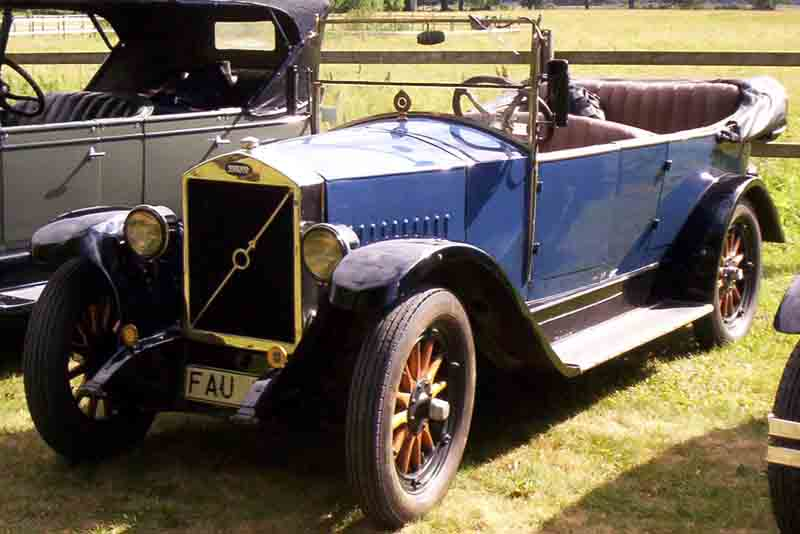
Volvo ÖV 4 Touring 1928

Between 1927 and 1929, a total of 996 cars were manufactured. Of these 694 were PV 4 and 302 ÖV 4. 251 of the covered cars were of the "PV 4 Special" model. The ÖV 4 production includes 27 naked chassis and 70 small pickup trucks (ÖV 4 TV) developed for Telegrafverket, the royal telecommunications company. Some of these light trucks were sold to other customers. The TV model has a small convertible top mounted just behind the front seats, with a cargo area behind.

== Technical specifications ==
- Engine: 4-cylinder side-valve, volume 1944 cc
- Power output: 28 hp (21 kW) at 2000 rpm
- Max. output torque: 100 N⋅m (74 lb⋅ft)
- Gearbox: 3 forward, 1 reverse
- Max speed: recommended 60 km/h (37 miles/h), top speed 90 km/h (56 mph)
- Weight: 1,170 kg (2,579 lb)

Beginning in 1928, four-wheel brakes became optional fitment.
