= Volvo Business Units =

Volvo Group business areas
- Company type: Business divisions
- Industry: Automotive; heavy equipment; transport
- Headquarters: Gothenburg, Sweden
- Area served: Worldwide
- Products: Trucks, engines, driveline systems, aftermarket services, transport technologies
- Number of employees: ~13,500 (selected units)
- Parent: Volvo Group
- Divisions: Volvo Group Trucks Technology (GTT); Volvo Powertrain; Volvo Parts; Volvo Technology
- Website: www.volvogroup.com

The Volvo Group consists of eight main business areas, which are supported within the group by a number of business units.

== Volvo GTT ==
Volvo Group Trucks Technology is a business unit responsible for product planning, product development, purchasing and product range management for the four truck companies, UD Trucks, Mack, Renault Trucks and Volvo Trucks, within the Volvo Group. Volvo 3P has offices in Allentown, Bangalore, Brisbane, Curitiba, Greensboro, Gothenburg, Lyon and Shanghai and employs approximately 5000 people. Volvo Group Trucks Technology (GTT) is the source base for global project and product design and development.

== Volvo Powertrain ==
Volvo Powertrain are the world's largest manufacturers of heavy-duty diesel engines (>9 liter volume).

Volvo Powertrain coordinates Volvo's powertrain activities and supplies the entire Volvo Group with driveline components, such as diesel engines and transmissions, which are either developed and manufactured by Powertrain or purchased. Volvo Powertrain has operations in Sweden, France, and North and South America with total of approximately 8,000 employees.

== Volvo Parts ==
Volvo Parts provide services and tools to support the Volvo aftermarket. Volvo Parts support six business areas within the Volvo Group; Volvo Trucks, Renault Trucks, Mack Trucks, Volvo Penta, Volvo Buses and Volvo Construction Equipment.

== Volvo Technology ==
Volvo Technology is the center for research and innovation within the Volvo Group, mainly developing new technologies and concepts for products and processes within the transport industry. Primary customers are the Volvo Group companies, but services are also provided to some selected suppliers.

Volvo Technology participates in national and international research programs involving universities, research institutes, other companies and stakeholders in e.g. society. The business unit has around 500 employees and operates in Gothenburg (Sweden), Lyon (France), Greensboro and Hagerstown (US), Bangalore (India) and Ageo (Japan).

== Volvo Information Technology ==
Volvo IT . Clients include the Volvo Group, Geely-owned Volvo Cars, and other large industrial external companies.

Volvo IT has around 6000 employees and offices in Gothenburg, Skövde, Olofström, Wrocław, Ghent, Lyon, Greensboro, Bangalore, Kuala Lumpur, Tianjin, Changwon, Ageo and Curitiba. Volvo intends to divest external IT business and outsource IT infrastructure operations to HCL Technologies.

== Volvo Logistics ==
Volvo Logistics designs and manages business logistics systems for the automotive and aviation industries. They are represented in Europe, North and South America and Asia, close to customers' largest plants or logistic hubs. Volvo Logistics serve customers both within and outside the Volvo Group and has around 700 employees and a turnover of approximately SEK 7 billion.

== Volvo Technology Transfer ==
Volvo Technology Transfer AB develops and supports new businesses with relevance for the Volvo Group.

== Volvo Business Services ==
Volvo Business Services is a global company that provides the Volvo Group of companies with services in the human resources and financial administration areas.

== List of Volvo Business Areas ==
- Volvo Trucks
- Mack Trucks
- Renault Trucks
- Nissan Diesel
- Volvo Buses
- Volvo Construction Equipment
- Volvo Penta
- Volvo Aero
- Volvo Financial Services

== See also ==
- Volvo Cars
