= Ulvåker =

- Location within Västra Götaland Location within Sweden
- Coordinates: 58°29′N 13°55′E
- Country: Sweden
- Province: Västergötland
- County: Västra Götaland County
- Municipality: Skövde Municipality

Area
  - Total: 0.24 km^{2} (0.093 sq mi)

Population (31 December 2010)
  - Total: 254
  - Density: 1,045/km^{2} (2,710/sq mi)
- Time zone: UTC+1 (CET)
  - Summer (DST): UTC+2 (CEST)

Ulvåker is a locality situated in Skövde Municipality, Västra Götaland County, Sweden with 254 inhabitants in 2010.
