= Greenlane EV charging corridor =

Commercial EV charging sites

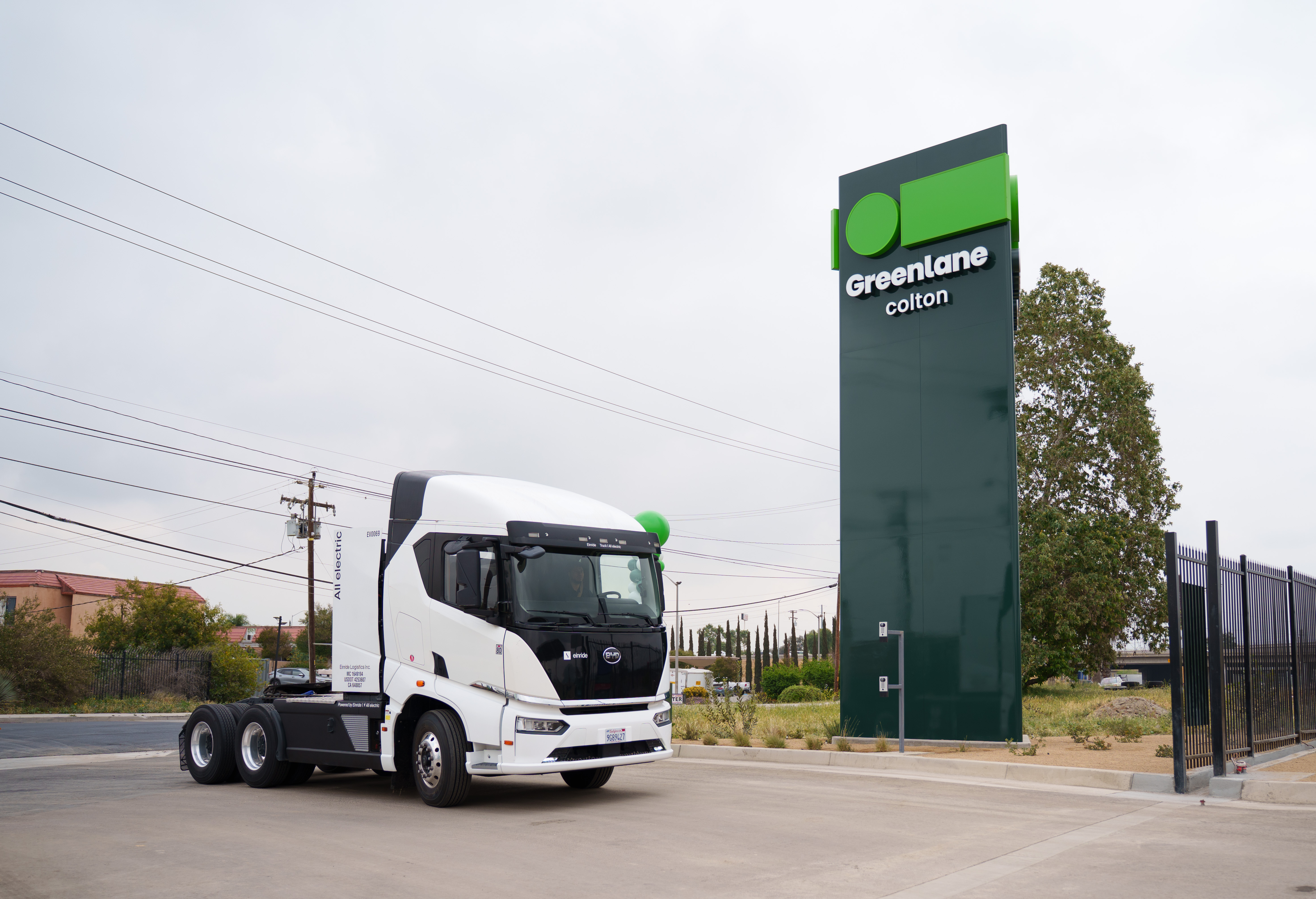
Truck driving past the Greenlane entry sign at the Colton location

Initial station sites across southern California

Greenlane is a commercial electric vehicle charging company building a nationwide network of public high-speed battery-electric fleet charging stations for medium and heavy-duty vehicles. They currently have one charging site open to the public in Colton that features 41 high-speed chargers. Those chargers include 400 kW chargers via pull-through lanes and 240 kW chargers via bobtail lanes.

== History ==
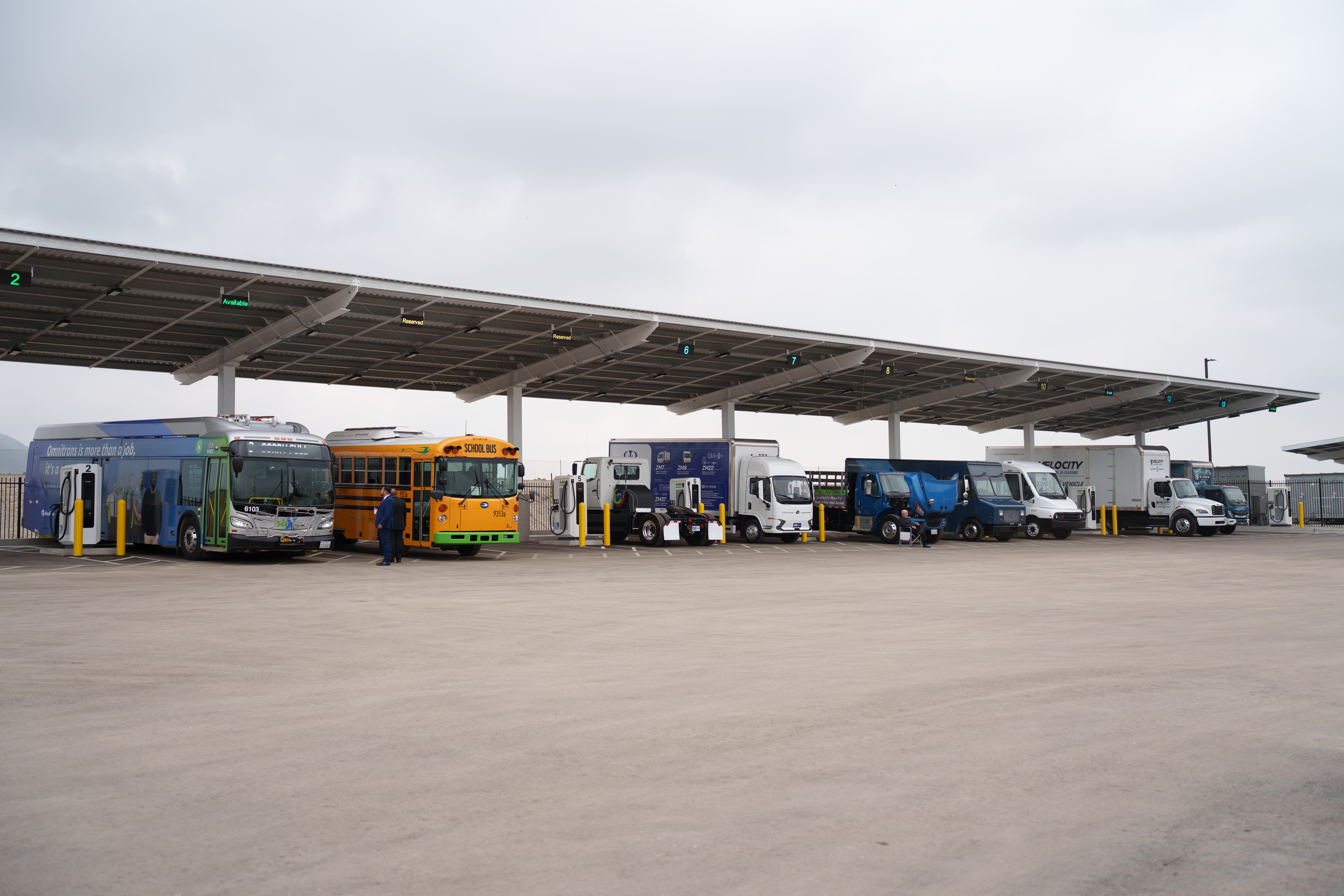
Various trucks, buses, and vans charging at the bobtail 180 kW chargers at Colton location

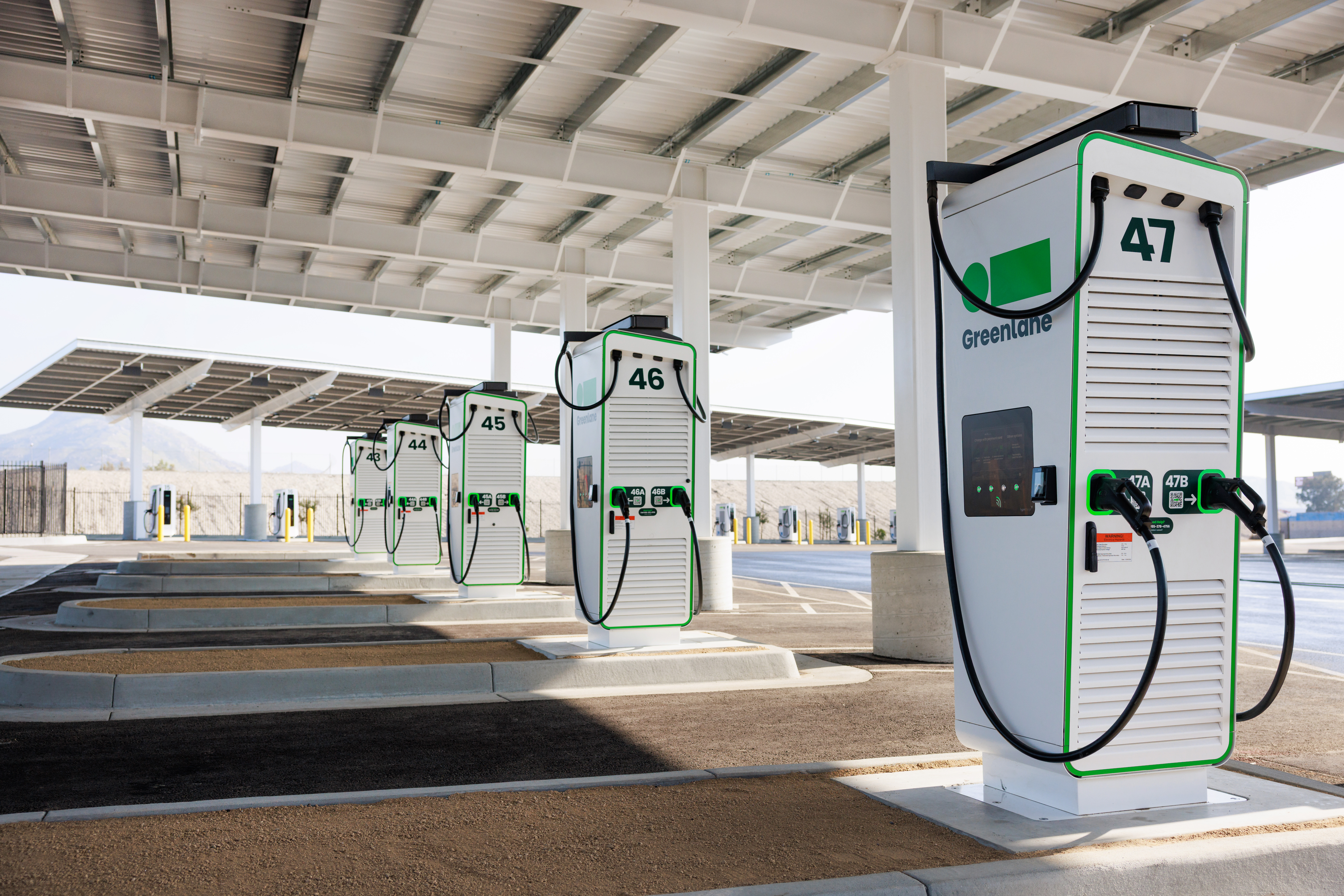
Pull-through lanes featuring 400 kW chargers at Colton location

The company builds new sites using a corridor approach, selecting locations along high-traffic routes for trucking fleets. Their first electric vehicle charging corridor is planned between the cities of Los Angeles and Las Vegas along a 280-mile (450 km) stretch of Interstate 15. They plan to build charging sites in the Barstow and Baker areas to pair with the Colton site.

The company is a $675 million joint venture involving Daimler Truck North America, energy company NextEra Energy, and investment company BlackRock to provide charging infrastructure for commercial EVs, namely freight moving trucks.

In addition to charging, Greenlane provides its fleet customers, such as Einride and Nevoya, with a technology ecosystem that includes a driver phone app and fleet management portal to reserve charging lanes and coordinate fleet driver movement.

Facilities are expected to be spaced around 60 to 90 miles (97 to 145 km) apart along the corridor. Greenlane uses telematics data from partners such as Uber Freight to decide where to build future stations.

In September 2024, Greenlane received a $15 million grant for the construction of the Colton, California charging station.

In April 2025, Greenlane announced a partnership with Volvo integrate their charging network into the Volvo Open Charge service.

In August 2025, Greenlane announced a second EV charging corridor, one that will connect Southern California to Arizona via Interstate 10.

== See also ==
- Milence
