= Igelstorp =

- Location within Västra Götaland Location within Sweden
- Coordinates: 58°24′N 13°58′E
- Country: Sweden
- Province: Västergötland
- County: Västra Götaland County
- Municipality: Skövde Municipality

Area
  - Total: 0.66 km^{2} (0.25 sq mi)

Population (31 December 2010)
  - Total: 677
  - Density: 1,027/km^{2} (2,660/sq mi)
- Time zone: UTC+1 (CET)
  - Summer (DST): UTC+2 (CEST)
- Climate: Dfb

Igelstorp is a locality situated in Skövde Municipality, Västra Götaland County, Sweden with 677 inhabitants in 2010.
