= Milence =

Operator of electric truck charging stations in Europe

Milence – Commercial Vehicle Charging Europe B.V.
- Type: Besloten vennootschap
- Industry: EV charging network for heavy-duty vehicles
- Founded: July 8, 2022; 4 years ago
- Headquarters: Amsterdam, Netherlands
- Area served: Europe
- Key people: Anja van Niersen (CEO)
- Owner: Joint venture between Daimler Truck, Traton Group (Volkswagen) and Volvo Group
- Website: www.milence.com

Milence (Company name: Commercial Vehicle Charging Europe B.V.) is a European electric vehicle (EV) charging network operator focused on battery-electric heavy-duty vehicles (trucks and coaches). It was founded in 2022 as a joint venture by Daimler Truck, the Traton Group (a subsidiary of the Volkswagen Group), and the Volvo Group to build and operate publicly accessible high-power charging hubs along major freight corridors and logistics routes in Europe (for example TEN-T).

== History ==
The joint venture was founded as Commercial Vehicle Charging Europe B.V. on 8 July 2022 with an initial investment of 500 million EUR. The three founding companies of the joint venture are Daimler Truck, the Traton Group (Volkswagen Group's heavy vehicle subsidiary), and the Volvo Group. They each own one third of the company. The headquarters of Milence is in Amsterdam, Netherlands and the CEO is Anja van Niersen.

On 6 December 2022, the joint venture began operating under the brand name Milence. The company plans to install and operate at least 1,700 charging points across Europe. The initial focus is on building and operating charging locations in the Netherlands, Germany, France, Belgium, Spain, Italy, Norway, and Sweden.

Milence opened its first charging hub on 7 December 2023 in Venlo, Netherlands, with phase one consisting of two CCS chargers rated up to 400 kW serving four charging bays. In February 2025, Milence secured over 111.5 million EUR in grants from the European Union's Alternative Fuels Infrastructure Facility (AFIF). In November 2025, Milence stated that it operated 30 public charging hubs across eight European countries.

== Business model ==
Milence's business model focuses on being a Charge Point Operator (CPO) for electric heavy-duty vehicles. The company builds, owns, and operates public charging hubs where electric trucks and buses can recharge, and it generates revenue primarily from the sale of electricity for vehicle charging.

A key element of Milence's business model is that its charging network is brand-agnostic and open-access: Chargers are available to any electric truck, regardless of manufacturer or brand. It targets both large fleet operators and independent truck owners. Milence also works via electric mobility service providers such as Paua who provide access in the UK.

== Charging infrastructure and technology ==
Milence follows a corridor-first strategy by building charging hubs along Europe's busiest freight routes (including TEN-T corridors) and at logistics hubs such as ports and distribution centers.

Milence's charging hubs are purpose-built for heavy vehicles, meaning they have the physical layout to accommodate large trucks, for example sufficient space for turning and extra-long parking/charging bays so that trucks do not have to uncouple their semi-trailer. All Milence sites aim to feature basic amenities such as clean restrooms and showers, proper lighting and security (fencing, CCTV cameras, controlled access), and often lounges or break areas for drivers. Some larger hubs provide vending machines for snacks and drinks.

Milence charging hubs typically feature multiple Combined Charging System (CCS) connectors supplying up to 400 kW of power each. A 400 kW DC charger can charge a large truck battery with a capacity of 600 to 700 kWh to a state of charge of 80 to 100% in about 1 to 2 hours.

A core part of Milence's technology roadmap is the Megawatt Charging System (MCS), a new standard for very high-power charging. MCS will typically charge at around 1 to 1.5 MW (1,000 to 1,500 kW). Milence states that MCS enables typical long-haul trucks to recharge within a 30 to 45 minute rest break once compatible vehicles are in service. In 2024, Milence and supplier Power Electronics validated an MCS prototype delivering about 1.1 MW. In February 2025, Milence deployed an MCS charger providing up to 1,440 kW at the Port of Antwerp, Belgium.

As of 2026, Milence has 34 hubs across Europe. In May of 2026 secured €120 million in financing.

== See also ==
- Greenlane EV charging corridor
