= Articulated hauler =

Heavy-duty dump truck

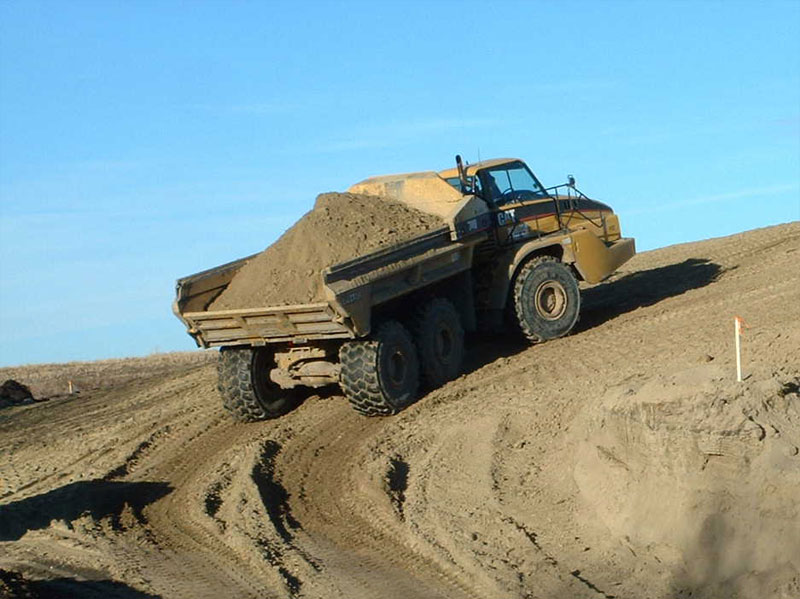
Caterpillar 740 Ejector going up an incline

Articulated hauler dump truck video

An articulated hauler, articulated dump truck (ADT), rock truck, wiggle wagon or sometimes a dump hauler, is a very large heavy-duty type of dump truck used to transport loads over rough terrain, and occasionally on public roads. The vehicle usually has all-wheel drive and consists of two basic units: the front section, generally called the tractor, and the rear section that contains the dump body, called the hauler or trailer section. Steering is made by pivoting the front in relation to the back via hydraulic rams. This way, all wheels follow the same path, making it an excellent off-road vehicle.

Manufacturers include Volvo CE, Caterpillar, John Deere/Bell Equipment, Moxy/Doosan, Astra and Komatsu. With half of the global sales, Volvo is the market leader in the segment, and is also the prime pioneer of the vehicle, enabling its introduction to the markets in 1966.

Originally developed as a soil and aggregate transporter (dumper), the chassis have since been used for many other applications including agriculture, mining, construction and highway maintenance. Ranging from concrete mixer, water tanker and container truck, over to upsize off-road semi-trailer hauler (on-road applications), hook loader or crane, as well as used to transport timber and as a woodchipper platform. Articulated hauler chassis have also been used for military purposes such as the Archer Artillery System due to their off-road capabilities being surpassed only by tracked vehicles.

== History ==
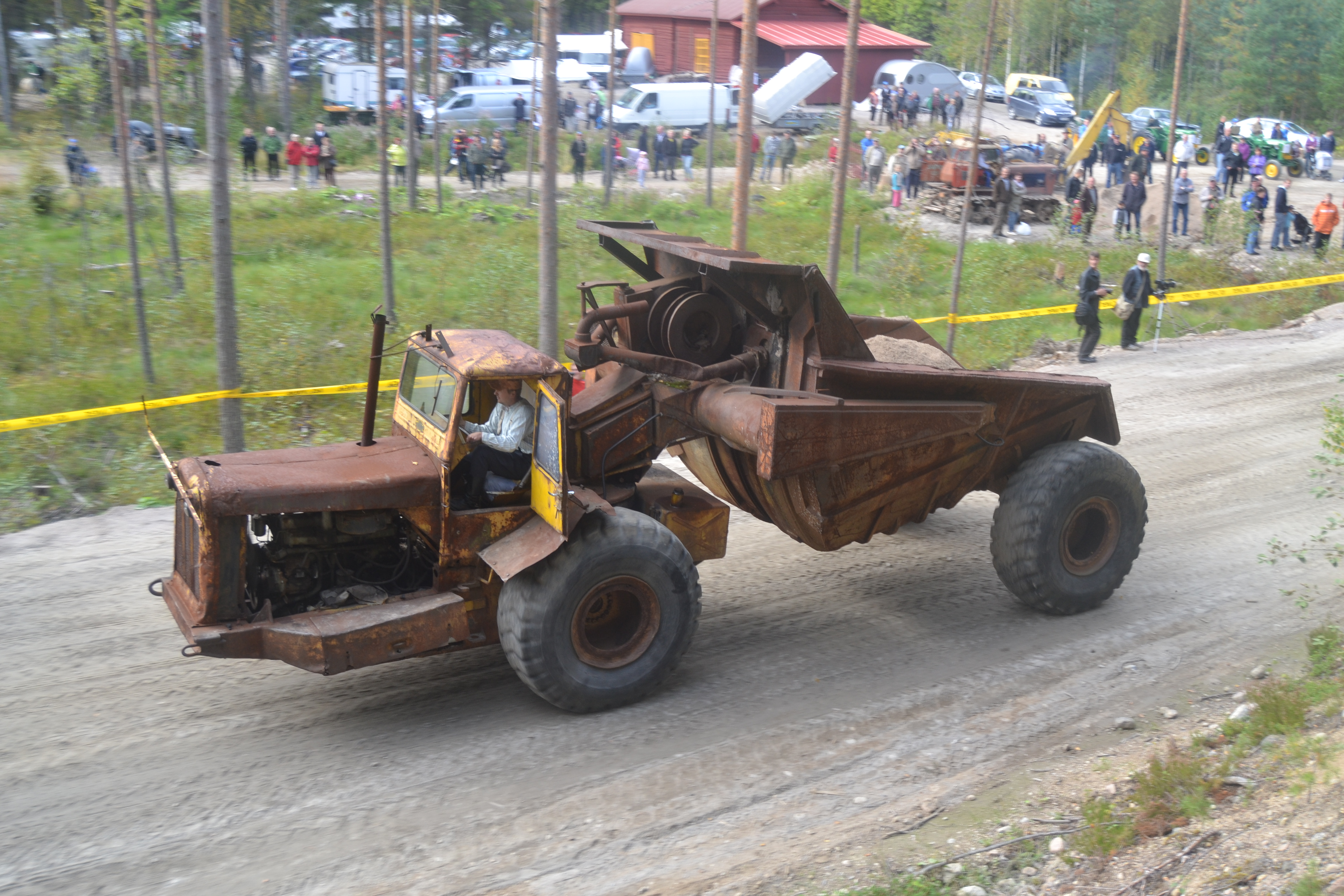
LeTourneau’s Tournapull Model C tractor with Tournarocker dump body trailer in Laukaa, Finland.

In 1938 R. G. LeTourneau founder of LeTourneau Inc a Longview, Texas based heavy equipment manufacturing company developed the Tourntailer the worlds first articulated dumper trailer. Based on the Model A Tournapull (a two-wheeled tractor manufactured by LeTourneau) it had a capacity of 28 cubic yards. Later in 1949 LeTourneau Australia built a limited number of dumper bodies named Rock-Buggies to attach to the Model C Tournapull which was the precursor to the Tournarocker. At the end of the World War II LeTourneau had Tournarockers available from 10 to 50 tons capacity but soon after in 1953 the earth moving division and patent rights to manufacture Tournarockers were sold to Westinghouse Air Brake Company (WABCO).

After LeTourneau’s Tournarocker bigger manufacturers like Allis-Chalmers, Caterpillar, International Harvester, Wooldridge, and Euclid started to offer similar trailers with their scraper tractors. Unlike the scraper tractors, ADT's were faster, had smaller engines, and were cheaper to maintain, which made them better suited for certain conditions. By the 1950s, major tractor manufacturers like International, Case, and Fordson started providing trailers with reinforced agricultural tractors because they found that hauling trailers requires less power than hauling on the prime mover itself. The first modern day ADT prototype was the F7 designed in 1957 by Northfield Industrial Fabrications Ltd. The F7 was introduced in 1960 with a modern-look, torque converter, 180-degree articulation, two hydraulic cylinders, and could carry 12 tons. It was powered by a diesel Ford 6D engine supported by a epicycle gear box. Later the higher capacity F9 hauler was launched with a 14-ton capacity in 1964. Soon after that, the F12 with a 20-ton capacity hauler arrived with 120 horsepower from a 6/354 diesel Perkins engine.

In 1955, the Swedish company tractor trailer manufacturer Lihnells Vagn AB (Livab) started to develop a specialized dump vehicle in cooperation with Bolinder-Munktell (BM), which in 1950 had been bought by Volvo but still operated as an independent daughter company. This was essentially a trailer with a powered axle mated to an agricultural tractor and utilizing its power take-off shaft to drive the trailer's axle. These were not articulated haulers in the modern sense, as the tractor retained its front axle to provide steering.

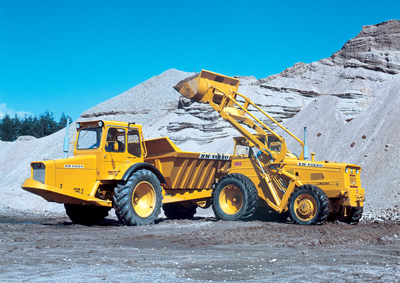
Volvo-BM DR631 with a Volvo-BM LM 640 back-loader

As Livab's cooperation with BM deepened, it started experimenting with getting rid of the front axle by permanently attaching the trailer and instead provide steering through hydraulic cylinders forcing the trailer and wagon to turn in relation to each other. This was made in analogue with systems already developed for use in tandem tractors (see for example Doe Triple-D). The first purpose-built articulated hauler was DR 631, a 4x4, released in 1966, with a larger 6x6 model DR 860 being released in 1968. In 1974 Livab was absorbed into Volvo BM.

Meanwhile, a very similar vehicle was developed by another Swedish company, Kockum Landsverk AB. Having a similar tractor derived design it released its first articulated 4x4 dumper truck in 1967 named KL 411 that was replaced by a similar sized 6x6 in 1973 named KL 412. This company competed with Volvo BM until 1982 when it was bought by its bigger competitor.

The early articulated haulers were rugged, lacked suspension and had manual transmissions. This made them uncomfortable, noisy and demanding to drive and contributed to operator fatigue. The lack of suspension, other than that inherent in the large tires, also put stress on the drive-train and chassis, making them unsuitable for high-speed operation and in need of frequent service. The top speed was a mere 30 km/h. Many of these concerns have been eliminated with development over the years.

In 1970 a Norwegian company now known as Moxy developed its first 6x6 articulated dump truck, which was put into serial production two years later as D15. It featured a bogie undercarriage. This combination later became a de-facto industry standard.

The driver situation was addressed with the introduction of front suspension in the Volvo BM 5350 of 1979. This model also saw the introduction of automatic transmission and instead of a tractor derived cab, a new purpose designed cab.

Today ADTs have evolved in design, axle configuration and payload capacity. Most manufacturers offer ADTs with 40 to 60 tons with reinforced body frames, axles, 4x4 and 6x6 axle configuration, hub reduction and solid hitch. Making them more durable than before and competition to rigid dump trucks. For driver comfort ADTs feature cameras, driver modes, climate control, diagnostics, telematics, weighing systems, traction control and automatic transmission. Today the Volvo A60 holds the title for the biggest ADT a 6x6 axle 60 ton capacity powered by D16J 16.1 liter producing 630hp supported by a PT3209 fully automatic planetary transmission.

== Alternative fuel ==
In 2023 Hydrema Baumaschinen GmbH a Weimar based german construction equipment manufacturer manufactured first fully electric articulated dump truck named DT6. Which uses ZF eTrac drive system and 29/69 kW electric motors which power the wheels the truck can be charges using Type 2 connector chargers or even conventional car chargers. With payload capacity of 5.5 tons the truck can operate for 8 hours with very low noise levels in a single charge on its liquid-cooled lithium-ion batteries which have a lifespan of 8 to 10 years.

In mid 2026 Volvo launched their first fully electric articulated haulers A30 and A40 which carries the same name as their diesel counterparts. These come with payload capacity of 29 tons and 39 tons respectively. Power from 600 V Lithium-Ion batteries which charge 20-80% within one hour via 350 kWh Combined Charging System one and two. The A30 weighs 26.5 tons with 5 battery units and A40 weighing 33.5 tons with 6 battery units. These trucks are focused on energy recuperation runs and loud construction areas because the trucks make very low level of noise. Initially limited customers will be offered the new electric lineup in 2026 and after a year when production number meets demand full commercial launch is scheduled in 2028.

== Design ==
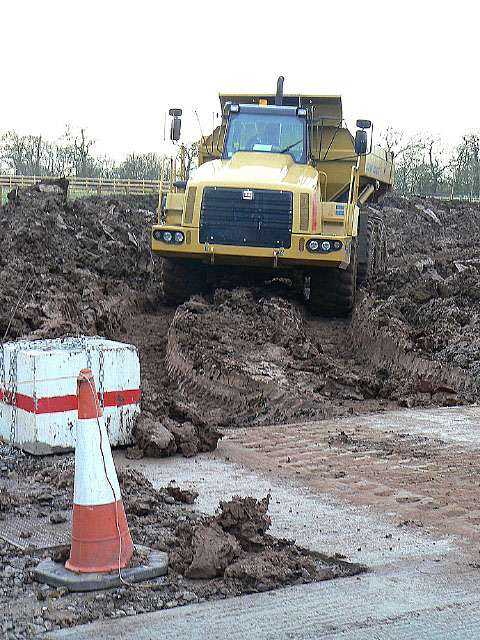
A Terex negotiating mud

Retained features from its agricultural tractor heritage is the operators location and the basic layout. The driver thus sit behind the engine and above the transmission and front drive axle. The permanently attached trailer can not move vertically in relation to the tractor, but can rotate and swing on the horizontal plane. The operator has a conventional steering wheel that actuates hydraulic cylinders that push and pull the tractor relative to the trailer. The tractor and the trailer sections can move at great angles to each other making for a small turning radius.

The trailer axle(s) are driven by a drive shaft exiting the rear of the transmission with splines and universal joints to accommodate the movement between them. All axles are portals with hub reduction and locking differentials. Initially the axle differentials were permanently locked but recently some models can run with open but lockable differentials for better high-speed capabilities. The usual twin back axles are combined in a separate frame that can pivot in relation to the "trailer" frame, keeping all wheels on the ground, but until recently always unsprung (called a "bogie"). Likewise the less-common trucks with single rear axles usually are unsprung in the rear, while the front axle have suspension to give the operator a better ride. The reinforced cab is sometimes also sprung, as is done in modern cab-over-engine trucks, as is the drivers seat.

The way the sections can twist in relation to each other and the way the vehicle steers, making the back tires follow the same path as the front tires, provide for excellent off-road capabilities in combination with all-wheel drive. The top speed is limited at 55–60 km/h (the ungoverned Archer Artillery System has a maximum road speed of "at least 70 km/h"; however this would be at expense of fuel economy and mechanical wear, and would exceed the standard speed of military convoys significantly) and the net loading capacity ranges from just below 25 to a little over 40 tonnes.

== Applications ==
Articulated haulers are widely used in construction for moving soil, gravel, sand, and rocks across rough job sites, in mining and quarrying for hauling ore, overburden, and blasted rock, and in forestry for transporting logs and biomass through muddy or narrow trails. They are also applied in large-scale agriculture to carry crops, silage, or manure, in landscaping and infrastructure projects such as roads, dams, and canals where terrain is uneven, and in oil, gas, and energy projects to move materials in remote or off-road sites. Additionally, they play a role in waste management and landfills by transporting debris and cover soil, making them highly versatile for industries that require reliable hauling on soft, steep, or challenging ground conditions.

== Comparison to rigid dump trucks ==
Articulated haulers excel in hauling material over rough terrain e.g. swamps, bogs, marshes. They are rugged and are built to handle great inclines and slippery conditions. This is their main advantage over rigid haulers, which excel in carrying capacity. Where an articulated hauler can take no more than 55 metric tonnes there are models of rigid haulers (haulers with conventional front steering and rear-wheel drive) that can carry up to 310 tonnes such as the Belaz 7550.

This is also seen in the way they are used. Whereas rigid haulers find their best usage at large surface mines and big quarries, where there is abundant space and hard level surfaces to drive on, articulated haulers are best used at rugged and cramped sites, such as large construction sites.

The articulated haulers relatively small size also make them able to drive on public roads between different worksites at a large construction project—something that is impossible for the largest haul trucks, which might even have to be disassembled to be moved between different locations. For transportation between different construction projects, articulated haulers usually have to be hauled on flatbed trailers as oversize cargo due to their width and weight, as well as their limited speed. However, in reality, it is normal for most articulated trucks to be trailered between worksites, as there are few construction sites giving an opportunity to drive on public roads between work zones, depending on the size of the machine (chassis, wheels, etc.) and the local laws this could also be illegal. For any distance greater than a few miles, it would also be considered uneconomical wear-and-tear on the hauler trucks, to be putting hours on them that are not contributing towards the paying job. It is far more efficient and quicker to use trucks and trailers and let them do what they specialize in, over-road hauling.

== See also ==
- Volvo Construction Equipment
- Dump truck
- Doosan Infracore (formerly Daewoo Heavy Industries & Machinery) - including Solar brand
- Gama Goat
- Archer Artillery System
