= Caterpillar 740 Ejector =

Articulated hauler

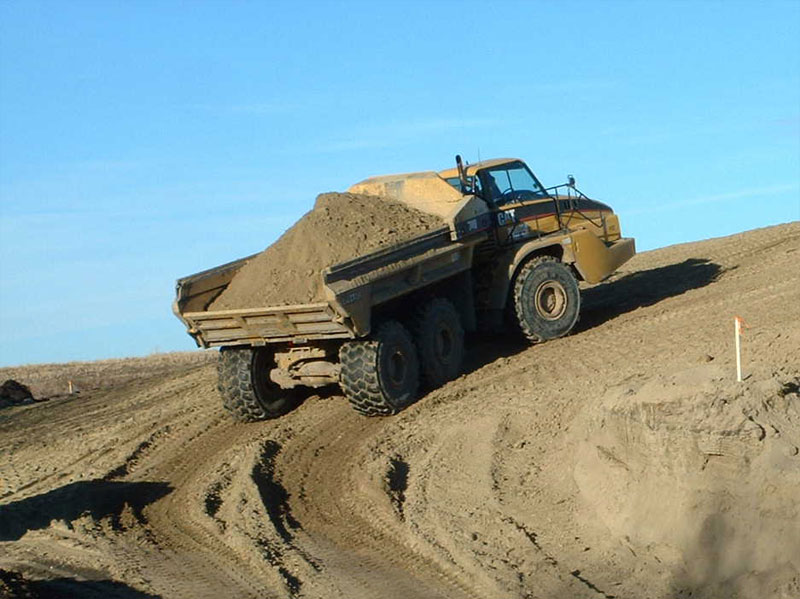
Cat 740 Ejector on a dirt ramp.

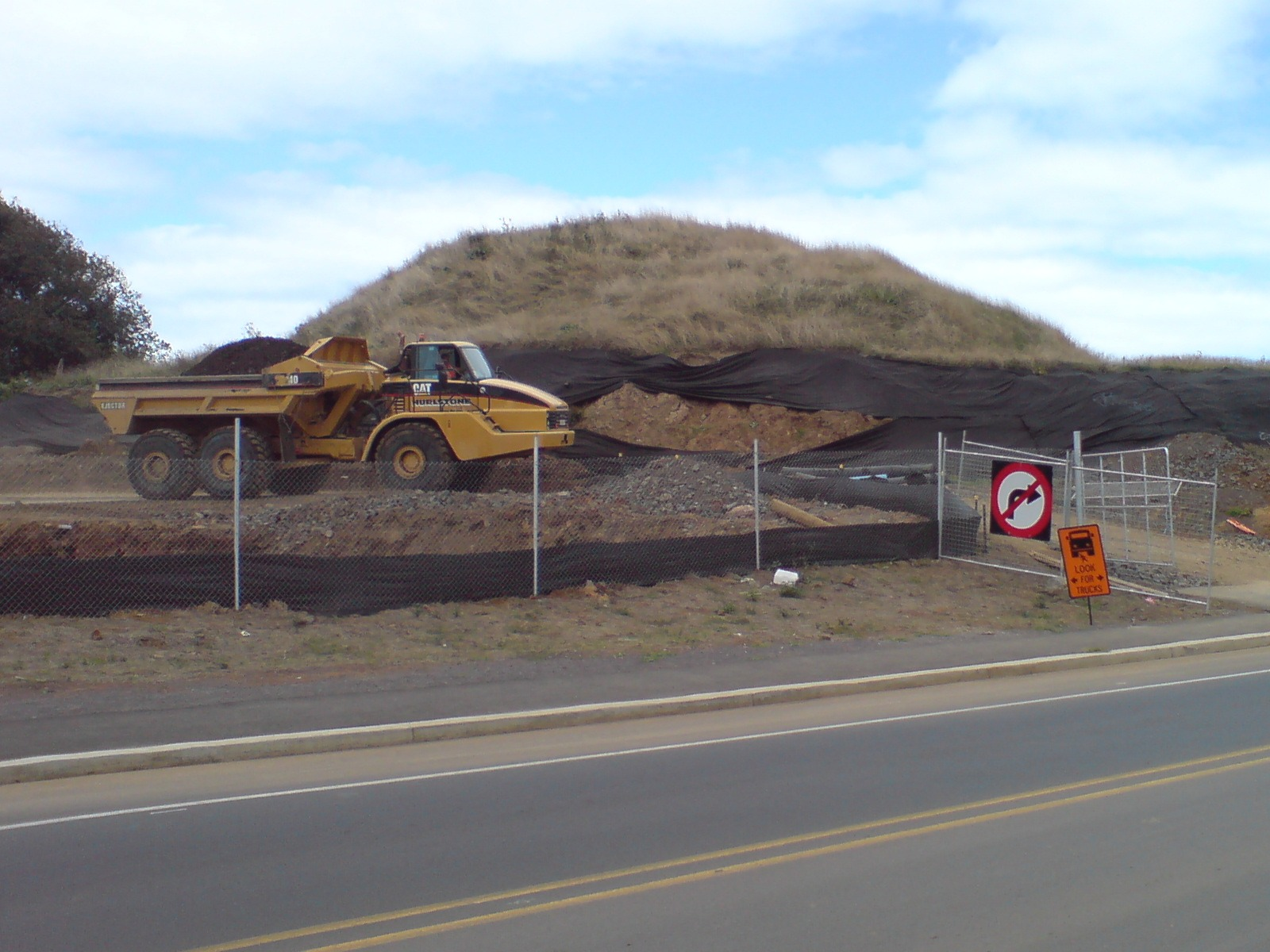
Cat 740 Ejector on a roadworks site.

The Caterpillar 740 Ejector Articulated Truck is Caterpillar's second generation of articulated haulers (dump truck) to have a system that pushes material out the back of the body. It is the largest articulated haul truck offered by Caterpillar; larger trucks use a rigid frame system. The ejector uses a 4-cylinder hydraulic ram and blade to dump the material out, a similar system to Cat's wheel tractor-scrapers. The 740 Ejector is sold as separate model from the usual 740.

Total power is 436 hp (325 kW), total operating weight is 162,280 lb (73,610 kg), with the load being 42 short tons (38 tonnes), 37.3 yd^{3} (28.5 m^{3}) at a 1:1 heap. Top forward speed is 34 mph (55 km/h).

== History ==
Caterpillar introduced an ejector version of its D400E in 2001. In 2002/2003, the DX00 series of trucks were replaced with the 7XX range. Currently Caterpillar supplies 725, 730, 730 Ejector, 735, 740 and 740 Ejector versions. The 7XX truck series uses the same cab design across all types. These are all manufactured in the UK.

== Advantages and disadvantages ==
Advantages

1. Lower risk of tipping over on slopes when dumping.
2. Ability to spread the material out over a distance.
3. Dumping does not increase the risk of contacting overhead obstacles (power lines, bridges, etc.).
4. Virtually eliminate any material remaining in the body after dumping.
5. Dumping and returning can be done without slowing down.

Disadvantages

1. Reduction in types of materials suited for hauling, large rocks can wedge between sidewall and ejector causing damage.
2. Winter operations may cause wet material to freeze on sidewall jamming ejector.
3. More complicated operation, additional parts to maintain.
4. Body can be damaged from contact while loading, preventing ejection.
