= Volvo Construction Equipment =

Company developing equipment for construction

- Formerly: VME Group
- Type: Subsidiary of the Volvo Group
- Industry: Heavy equipment
- Predecessors: Eskilstuna Mekaniska Verkstad; Munktells Mekaniska Verkstads Aktiebolag; AB Bolinder-Munktell; Volvo BM
- Founded: 1832 in Eskilstuna, Sweden
- Founders: Johan Theofron Munktell; Jean (Johan) Gerhard Bolinder; Carl Gerhard Bolinder
- Headquarters: Eskilstuna, Sweden
- Areas served: Worldwide
- Key people: Melker Jernberg, (President)
- Products: compactors; demolition equipment; dumpers; excavators; haulers; loaders; material transfer vehicles; milling equipment; motor graders; pavers; pipelayers; road wideners; tack distributors; waste handlers
- Brands: Volvo; SDLG
- Revenue: ▼50.731 billion kr (2016)
- Operating income: ▲2.246 billion kr (2016)
- Number of employees: 13,397 (2016)
- Parent: Volvo
- Subsidiaries: SDLG
- Website: volvoce.com

Volvo Construction Equipment - Volvo CE - (originally Munktells, Bolinder-Munktell, Volvo BM) is a major international company which develops, manufactures, and markets equipment for construction and related industries. It is a subsidiary and business of the Volvo Group.

== Overview ==
Volvo CE's products include a range of wheel loaders, hydraulic excavators, articulated haulers, motor graders, soil and asphalt compactors, pavers, backhoe loaders, skid steers, and milling machines. Volvo CE has production facilities in the United States, Brazil, Scotland, Sweden, France, Germany, Poland, India, China, Russia, and South Korea.

Volvo CE predominantly sells machines under the Volvo brand. It sold machines under SDLG branding between 2007 and 2025. It sold the former Terex articulated hauler dump truck (ADT) line as Rokbak between 2021 and 2026, distinguishing them from Volvo's existing ADT line.

== History ==
Three men laid the foundation for Volvo Construction Equipment: Johan Theofron Munktell and two brothers Jean Bolinder and Carl Gerhard Bolinder.

- In 1832, Johan Theofron Munktell who was then 27, began what became Volvo Construction Equipment in Eskilstuna, Sweden. In 1913, Munktell and his team produced Sweden's first tractor. Elsewhere in Sweden, other entrepreneurs were making progress. Jean and Carl Gerhard Bolinder, who were brothers from Stockholm, had been manufacturing steam engines and crude engine oil since 1844.
- In 1932, a century after Johan Theofron Munktell's began his company in Eskilstuna, Bolinder moved to Eskilstuna and both companies merged under the name AB Bolinder-Munktell. In 1934, Bolinder Munktell produced the legendary BM 25 tractor.
- In 1950, Volvo bought the machine manufacturer Bolinder-Munktell (BM). Four years later in 1954, the company produced its first wheel loader H10. It was the world's first loader to feature a parallel lift arm system and attachment bracket, establishing Volvo as one of the leading construction companies in the world. They produced the world's first articulated hauler: the Volvo DR 631 Gravel Charlie in 1966.
- In 1973, the company changed its name to Volvo BM AB. In 1979, Valmet partnered with Volvo and produced tractors under the Volvo BM Valmet brand. Valmet and Massey Ferguson agreed to produce tractors at Massey Ferguson's factory in Beauvais, France. The tractor manufacturing division was sold to Valmet in 1985. Also in 1985, Volvo BM joined the American manufacturer Clark Equipment and its subsidiary Euclid Trucks. The product name Clark Michigan was abbreviated to Michigan and the three brand names Volvo BM, Michigan, and Euclid were incorporated into the new company VME Group.
- In 1991, the Åkermans Verkstad (in Swedish) became part of the VME Group and continued to strengthen its position in the construction equipment market. The company had a history of innovation, with AB Åkermans Gjuteri & Mekaniska Verkstad building the first line excavator in 1939 and the first hydraulic excavator in 1962. AB Landsverk also contributed by introducing its own hydraulic excavator in 1968. By 1972, excavator production at AB Landsverk was transferred to AB Åkermans Gjuteri & Mekaniska Verkstad, marking a pivotal moment in the company's history.
- In 1995, VME became a fully owned Volvo company and changed its name to Volvo Construction Equipment. In 1998, Volvo CE became the first foreign company to invest in Korea. The acquisition of Samsung Heavy Industries (Construction Equipment Division) increased its sales and presence in Asia.
- In January 2007, Volvo purchased 70% of SDLG. In April of the same year, Volvo also finalized the acquisition of a division of the American company Ingersoll Rand. The division manufactures machines for road construction. In July 2020, Volvo Construction sold Blaw-Knox pavers to Gencor Industries Inc. which is in Orlando.
- In December 2013, VCE agreed to pay US$160m for the heavy haul truck line of U.S. manufacturer Terex, Including Terex Equipment Ltd (TEL) of Scotland. In 2018, the new lineup of rigid haulers was branded Volvo, with Terex branding only remaining on the articulated haulers.
- In December 2020, Volvo began delivering all-electric ECR25 Electric compact excavators to customers.
- In September 2021 VCE launched a new Rokbak brand for the Motherwell-manufactured articulated haulers, phasing out the Terex branding.
- In June 2024, Volvo CE completed the divestment of its global ABG paver business to the Ammann Group. The transaction included ABG's production and technology centre in Hameln and paving businesses in Bangalore and Linyi.
- In June 2025, VCE announced the divestment of its China-based SDLG business to Lingong Group. The sale was completed in September 2025.
- In March 2026, VCE announced that it would cease production of Rokbak articulated haulers at the former Terex facility in Scotland, which would focus on rigid hauler production.

== Brands ==
=== Volvo ===
The majority of Volvo CE's products have been branded as Volvo, or hybrid-branded in the days of Volvo BM.

=== SDLG ===
Volvo acquired a 70% stake in Chinese manufacturer SDLG in January 2007, gaining access to Chinese markets. Chinese firm Lingong Group maintained a minority stake. Under Volvo ownership, SDLG products were substantially old-generation Volvo models that had been superseded. Volvo divested the stake in 2025.

=== Rokbak ===
Rokbak was a short-lived brand of articulated dump trucks (ADTs) marketed by Volvo Construction Equipment between 2021 and 2026.

In 2014 Volvo CE acquired the Terex Trucks business in Motherwell, Scotland. In 2018, the Rigid Hauler line was rebranded from Terex to Volvo. As Volvo already had a line of articulated trucks, the articulated products manufactured in Motherwell continued to be branded as Terex. In 2021, Rokbak was unveiled as a new brand for the ADT line. Rokbak was marketed as a low-tech and straightforward product compared with premium models from Volvo, Cat, Develon and Bell. In 2026 Volvo announced the Rokbak brand and product line would be discontinued, with ADT production at Motherwell ending and the site focused on Volvo-branded rigid haulers.

== Gallery ==
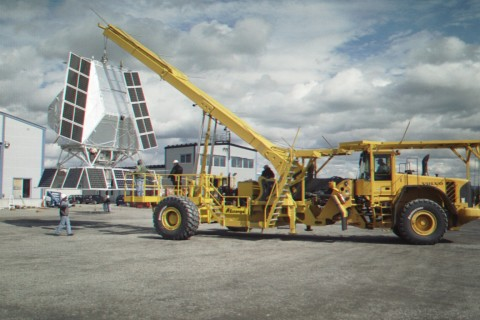
A heavily modified Volvo is used during the launch of large balloon payloads at Esrange in northern Sweden.

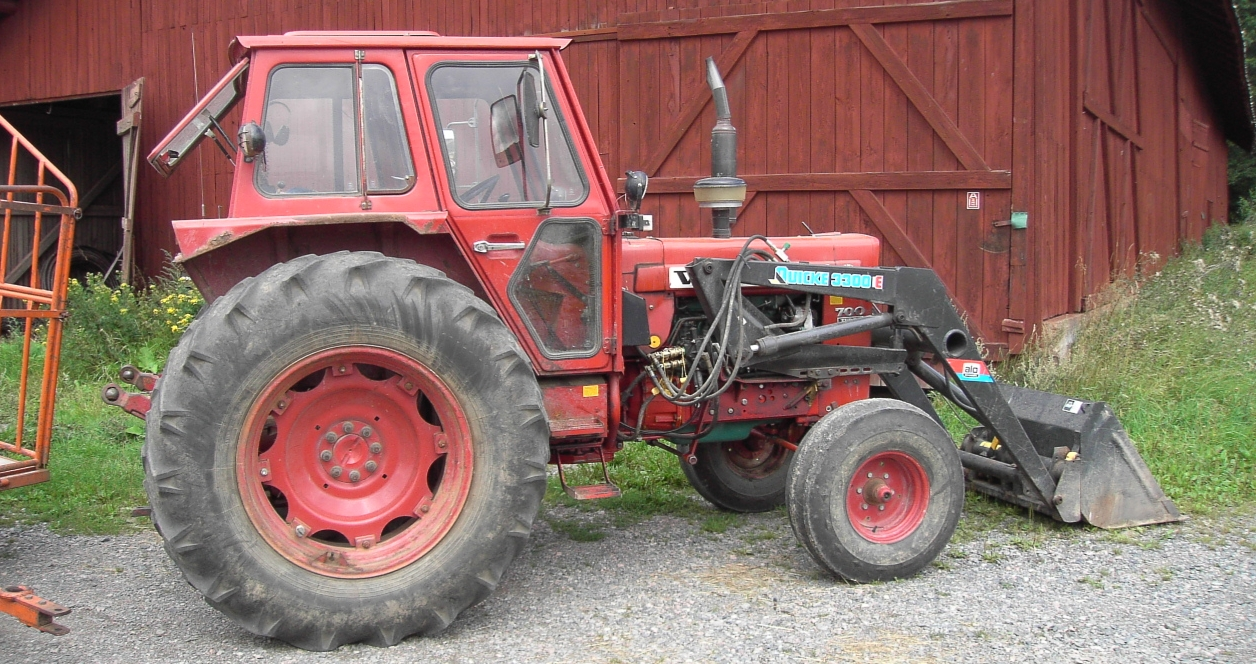
Volvo BM tractor

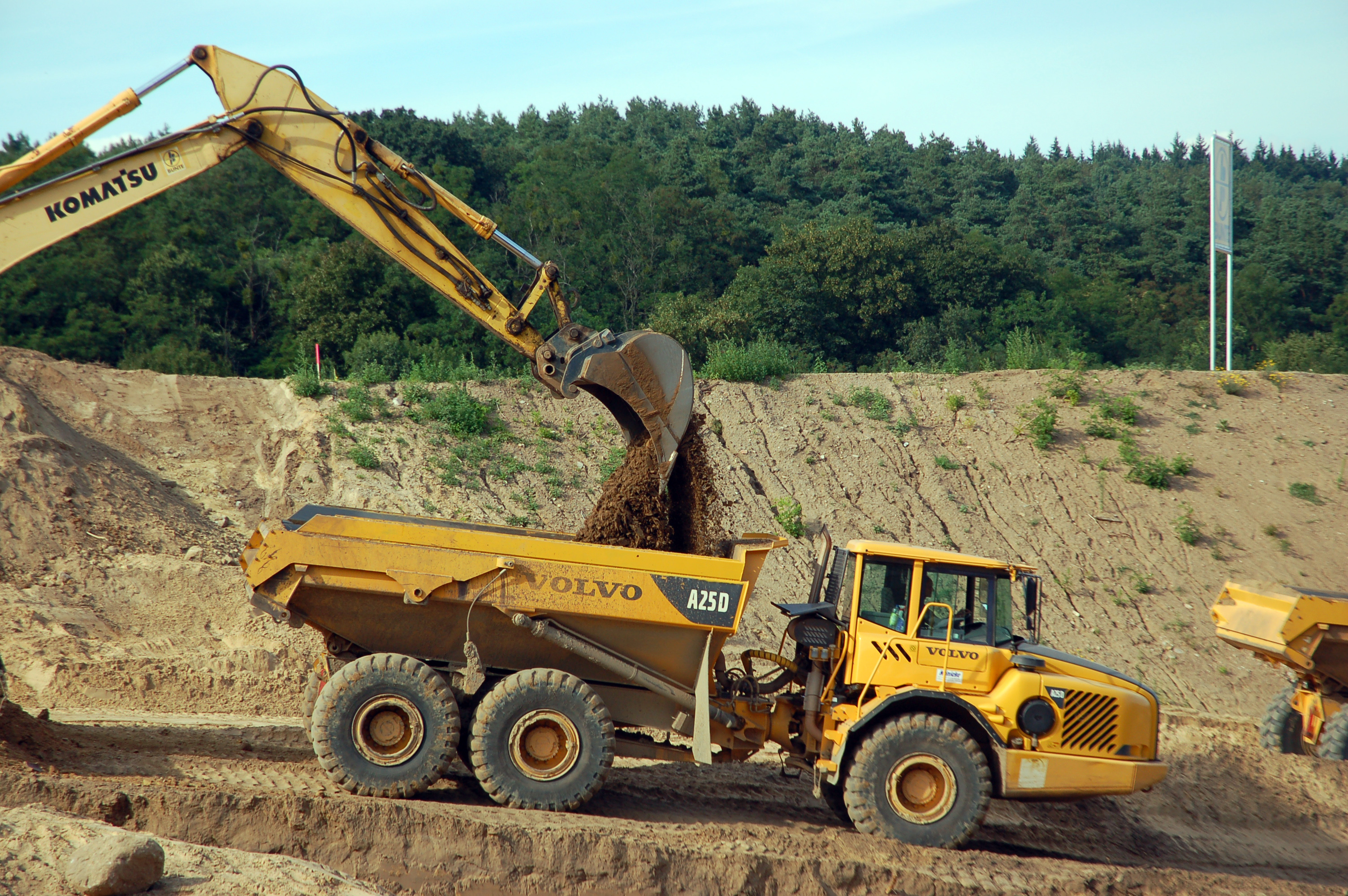
Volvo A25D

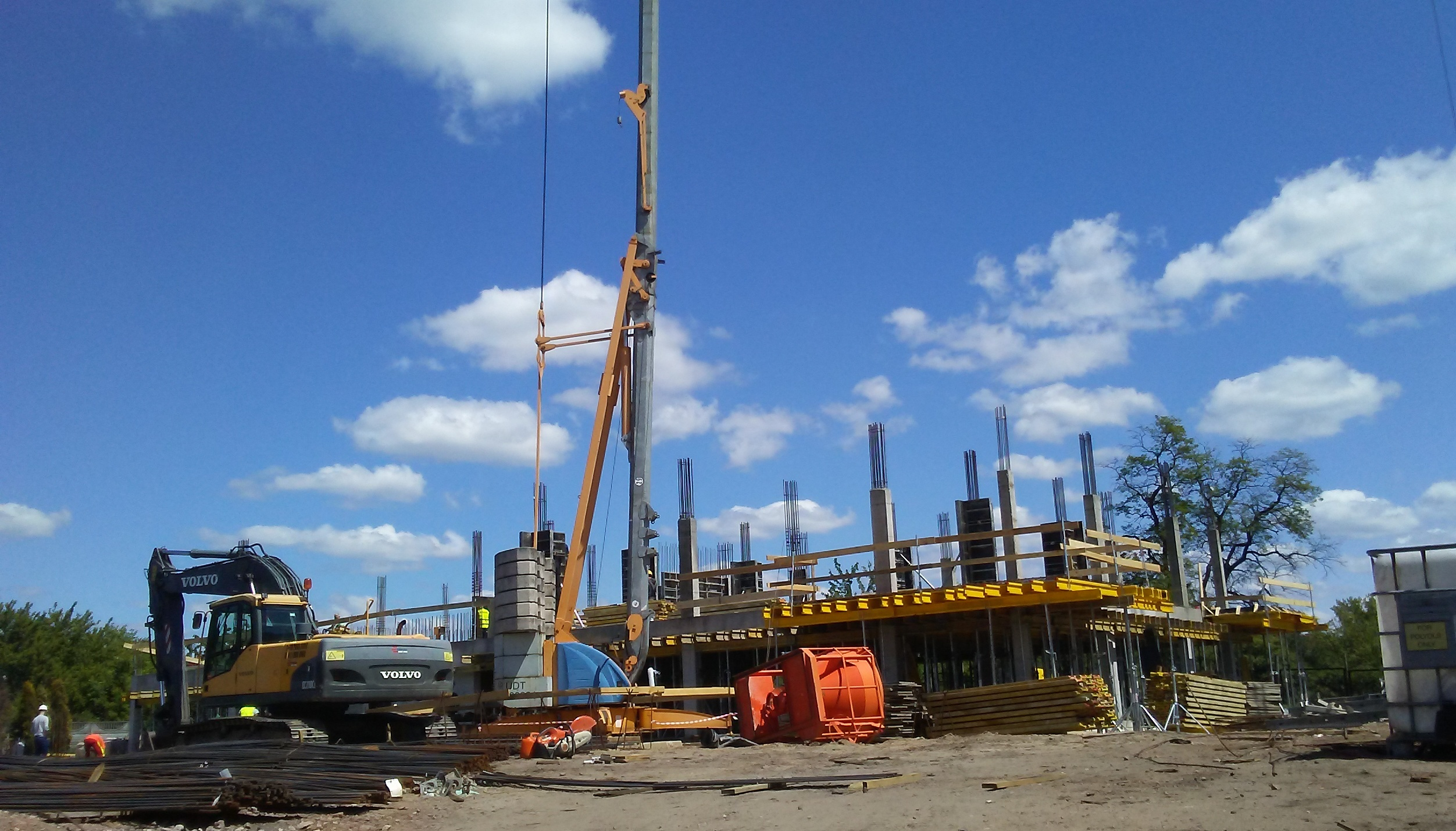
Volvo excavator on construction site in Tomaszów Mazowiecki, Poland

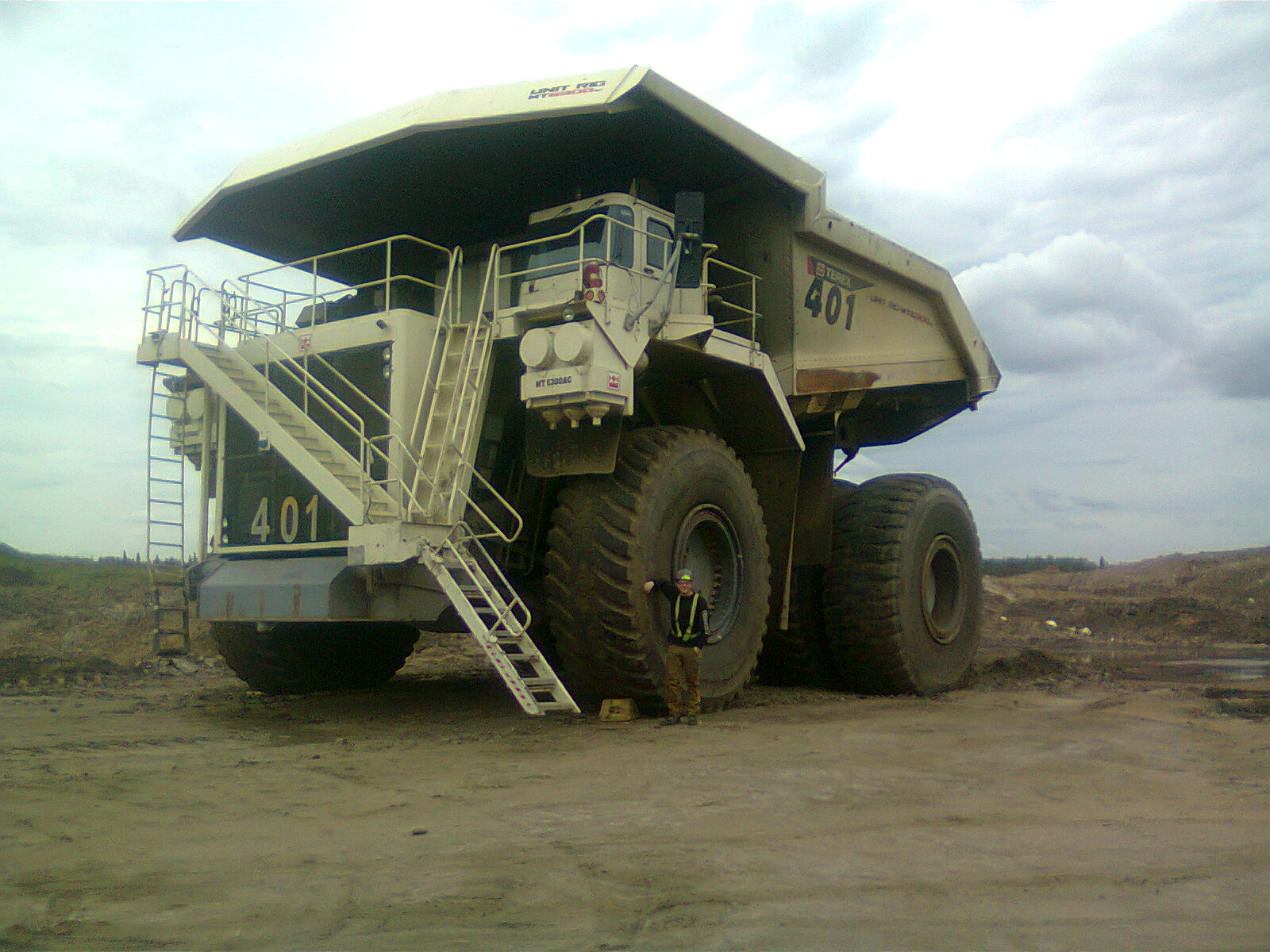
A Terex 6300AC "Heavy Hauler", one of the biggest dump trucks in the world. c. 2000. Volvo acquired the brand in 2014, and dropped the name for rigid dump trucks in 2018.

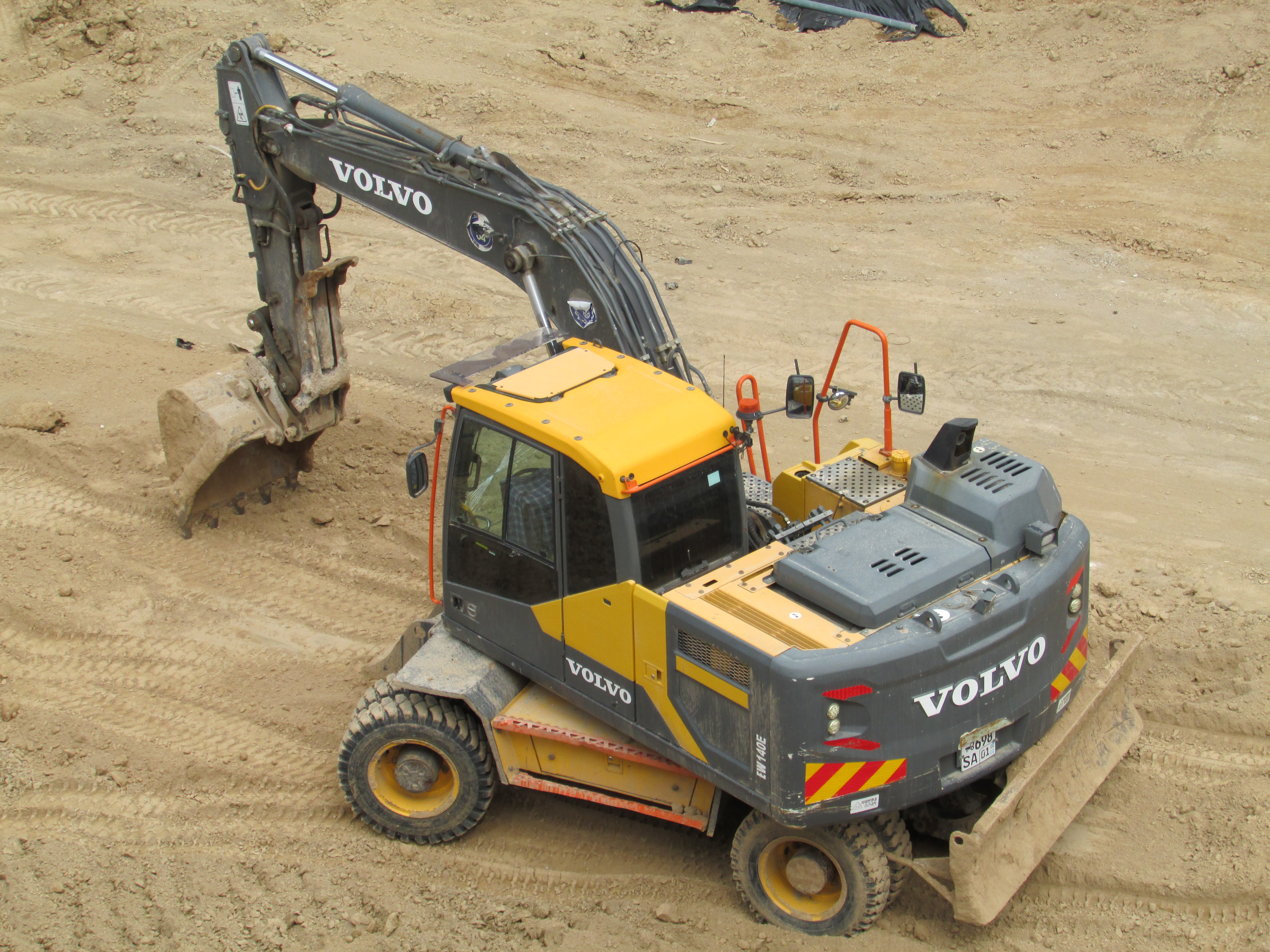
Volvo EW140D during work.
