= Volvo Financial Services =

Volvo Financial Services (VFS), established in 2001, offers financial services for Volvo Group's brands. VFS' global headquarters are located in Gothenburg, Sweden. A global organization serving nearly 50 markets, VFS focuses exclusively on providing financial services and solutions to the Volvo Group's internal and external customers.

VFS offers its products under the labels of: Mack Financial Services, Renault Trucks Financial Services, SDLG Financial Services, and Volvo Financial Services. Each line is designed to support one or more of the product brands offered by the Volvo Group.

Volvo Financial Services does not provide financing for Volvo Cars, which was sold to Ford Motor Company in 1999.
