= SDLG =

Marca de maquinaria de contruccion

Shandong Lingong Construction Machinery Co., Ltd.
- Native name: 山东临工工程机械有限公司 (Chinese)
- Type: Subsidiary
- Industry: Heavy equipment
- Founded: 1972
- Headquarters: Linyi, China
- Products: Heavy equipment, Engine
- Parent: Volvo Construction Equipment

Chinese name
- Simplified Chinese: 山东临工工程机械有限公司
- Traditional Chinese: 山東臨工工程機械有限公司
Transcriptions
Standard Mandarin
- Hanyu Pinyin: Shāndōng Língōng Gōngchéng Jīxiè Yǒuxiàn Gōngsī
- Website: www.sdlg.com

Shandong Lingong Construction Machinery Co., Ltd. (Abbreviated SDLG), established in 1972, is an international construction equipment manufacturer and service provider. SDLG is dedicated to the development and production of wheel loaders, excavators, road machinery, and their core components. SDLG products are present in more than 130 countries and regions after over 50 years of development. SDLG has received a series of honors, including China's Top 100 Enterprises in Machinery Industry, National Labor Medal, China Quality Award, and EFQM Global Excellence Award.

== History ==
SDLG was established in 1972 in Linyi, China. In 1994, it transitioned into a joint-stock company under the name Shandong Linyi Construction Machinery Co., Ltd. and later became Shandong Lingong Construction Machinery Co., Ltd. in 2003.

In 2006, Volvo Construction Equipment (Volvo CE) acquired a 70% stake in SDLG, forming a joint venture that facilitated technology transfers and international expansion. This partnership enabled greater technological innovation, adoption of more advanced manufacturing processes, and expansion into global markets.

=== SDLG Milestones ===
- 1972: SDLG was founded in Linyi, China.
- 1976: First ZL40 wheel loader launched.
- 1984: First ZL50 wheel loader launched.
- 1987: Recognized as a Provincial Advanced Enterprise by the Shandong Provincial Government, China.
- 1989: Classified as a National Second-Class Enterprise by the former Ministry of Machinery and Electronics, China.
- 1991: ZL40 wheel loader recognized as a quality product by the former Ministry of Machinery and Electronics, China.
- 1993: Included in China's Top 500 Industrial Enterprises With the Best Economic Performance
- 1995: Upgraded to a National Large-Scale Enterprise (Tier 1) by Chinese authorities.
- 1996: Awarded AAA Credit Rating by the Shandong Credit Rating Committee, China. First excavator launched.
- 1997: Received the Export Product Quality License from Chinese regulatory agencies.
- 1998: Listed on the Shanghai Stock Exchange. Achieved ISO 9001 Quality Certification.
- 2003: Designated as a National High-Tech Enterprise by China. Established a Postdoctoral Research Station.
- 2005: SDLG Industrial Park was completed, with annual production and sales exceeding 10,000 units.
- 2006: Entered a strategic partnership with Volvo Construction Equipment.
- 2010: Officially launched the excavator product line.
- 2011: Established the SDLG Technical Center. Sales revenue over 10 billion RMB
- 2012: Joined the WWF Climate Savers program.
- 2022: The 50th Anniversary of the company.

== Products ==
SDLG manufactures various types of construction equipment, including:

- Wheel Loaders – Used for material handling and earthmoving applications.
- Excavators – Designed for construction, mining, and infrastructure projects.
- Road Rollers – Utilized for soil and asphalt compaction.
- Motor Graders – Essential for road grading and leveling.
- Backhoe Loaders – Versatile machines for excavation and loading.
- Compact Construction Equipment – Includes smaller machinery for specialized applications.

== Customer Support & Services ==
SDLG provides after-sales services through a global network of service centers. Its support offerings include:

- Operator training and technical assistance.
- Comprehensive maintenance programs.
- Worldwide spare parts distribution.
- Second-hand equipment resale programs.

== Research & Development ==
SDLG has invested in research and development to enhance machine performance, fuel efficiency, and automation. The company operates a National Construction Machinery Technology Center and a Postdoctoral Research Station and collaborates with academic institutions such as Beihang University, Jilin University, and Shanghai Jiao Tong University.

== Technological Innovation ==
- Infrastructure Development: SDLG has constructed a product trial workshop and expanded its testing facilities, investing over 30 million RMB to support new product development.
- Digital Design & Testing: The company utilizes advanced 3D modeling, motion analysis, and finite element analysis (FEA) to refine product design and durability.
- R&D Expenditure: Over the past three years, research and development expenses accounted for approximately 5.3% of total revenue.
- Workforce & Talent: SDLG employs 284 engineering professionals, including 57 with postgraduate degrees and 14 external experts specializing in construction machinery design and optimization.

== Key Innovations ==
- Intelligent Monitoring Systems: SDLG has developed an integrated electromechanical-hydraulic monitoring system for real-time diagnostics and remote tracking.
- Energy-Efficient Wheel Loaders: New generation models achieve up to 20% fuel savings, verified through testing by independent certification bodies.
- Advanced Transmission Technology: Development of independent cooling systems and dual-variable hydraulic systems for large-scale loaders, reducing energy consumption while improving operational stability.
- Automated Transmission Systems: The company has advanced electronic transmission control technologies, enhancing gear-shifting precision in construction machinery applications.
- Human-Machine Engineering: Improvements in operator cabin ergonomics, reducing fatigue and improving machine control efficiency.

SDLG adheres to industry quality standards and has achieved:

- ISO 9001 Quality Management Certification.
- ISO 14001 Environmental Management Certification.
- Export Product Quality License.

The company has implemented a Lean Production System (LPS) to optimize efficiency and ensure consistent product quality.

== Global Operations ==
SDLG's products currently reach over 140 countries and regions, with the establishment of overseas corporations and offices in key markets and regions such as Europe, North America, Indonesia, the Philippines, Saudi Arabia, the United Arab Emirates, Kazakhstan, and the Democratic Republic of the Congo. With nearly 100 dealers in place, SDLG continues to enhance its overseas channel network. In terms of overseas service brand building, SDLG has introduced its TOP SERVICE brand in six countries and set up two overseas spare parts central warehouses. Through a series of service visits and the promotion of concierge-style services, SDLG has successfully cultivated a brand image that emphasizes quick response, efficient operations, and high-quality service. By adhering to its concept of "Reliability in Action", SDLG has gradually become the preferred Chinese construction machinery brand for overseas customers.

== Brand Honor ==
- 2007: Wheel loader was awarded the title of National Famous Brand
- 2008: China Machinery Industry Top 100 Enterprise
- 2009: China Well-known Trade Mark
- 2011: National Labor Medal
- 2012: State-level Technology Center
- 2014: Shandong Provincial Governor Quality Award
- 2015: National High-tech Enterprise
- 2016: China Quality Award
- 2017: The 15th ANQ ARE-QP Award
- 2019: EFQM Global Excellence Award
