= Skövde Municipality =

Skövde Municipality Skövde kommun
- Municipality
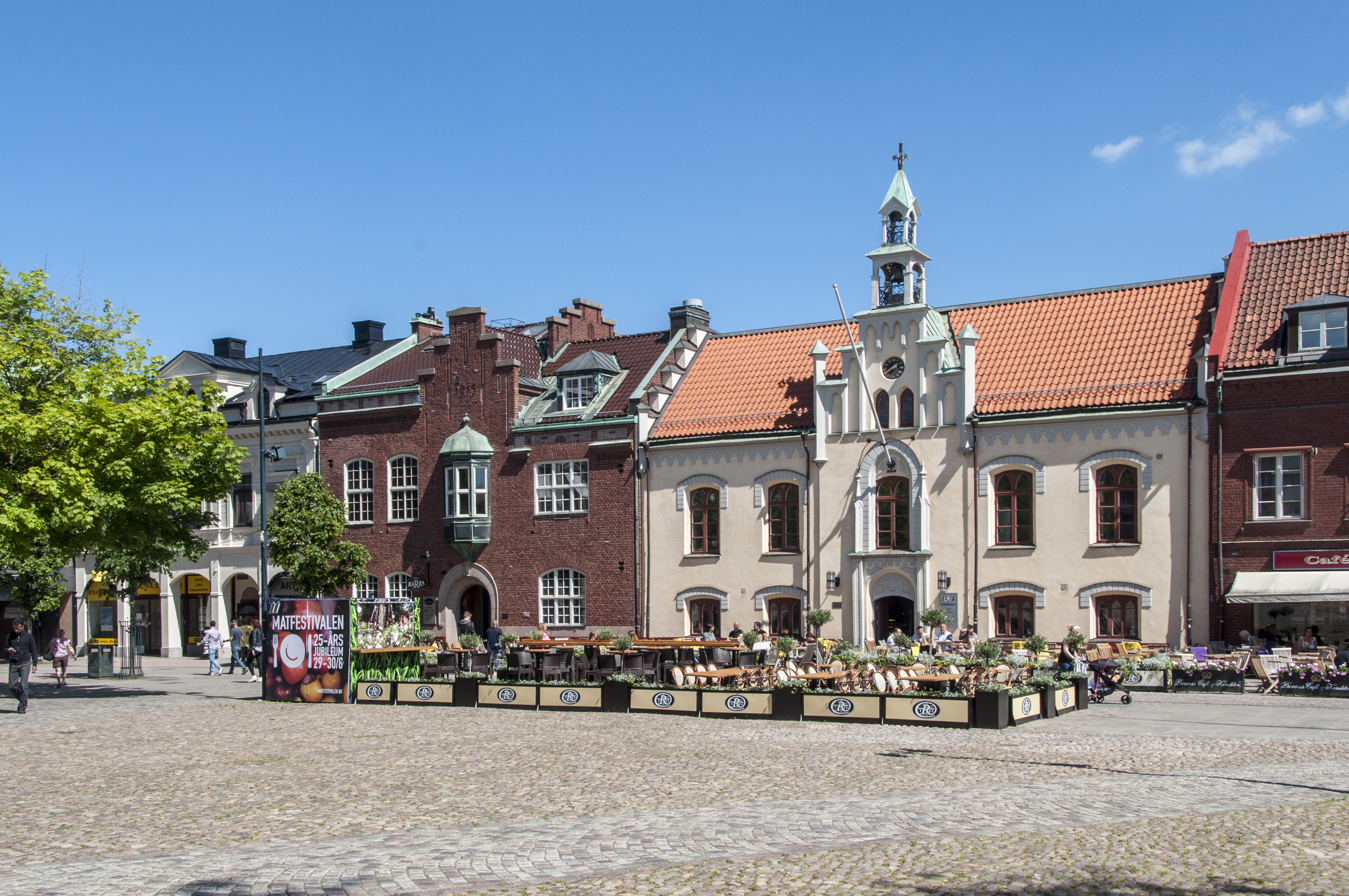
- Skövde town hall

- Coat of arms

- Coordinates: 58°23′N 13°51′E
- Country: Sweden
- County: Västra Götaland County
- Seat: Skövde

Area
  - Total: 685.08 km^{2} (264.51 sq mi)
  - Land: 673.68 km^{2} (260.11 sq mi)
  - Water: 11.4 km^{2} (4.4 sq mi)
- Area as of 1 January 2014.

Population (30 June 2025)
  - Total: 57,997
  - Density: 86.090/km^{2} (222.97/sq mi)
- Time zone: UTC+1 (CET)
  - Summer (DST): UTC+2 (CEST)
- ISO 3166 code: SE
- Province: Västergötland
- Municipal code: 1496
- Website: www.skovde.se

Skövde Municipality (Swedish: Skövde kommun) is a municipality in Västra Götaland County in western Sweden. Its seat is located in the city of Skövde.

The present municipality was formed in 1971 when the City of Skövde was amalgamated with five surrounding municipalities. The number of original entities (as of 1863) is nearly 30. They had in 1952 been reduced to six.

== Economy ==
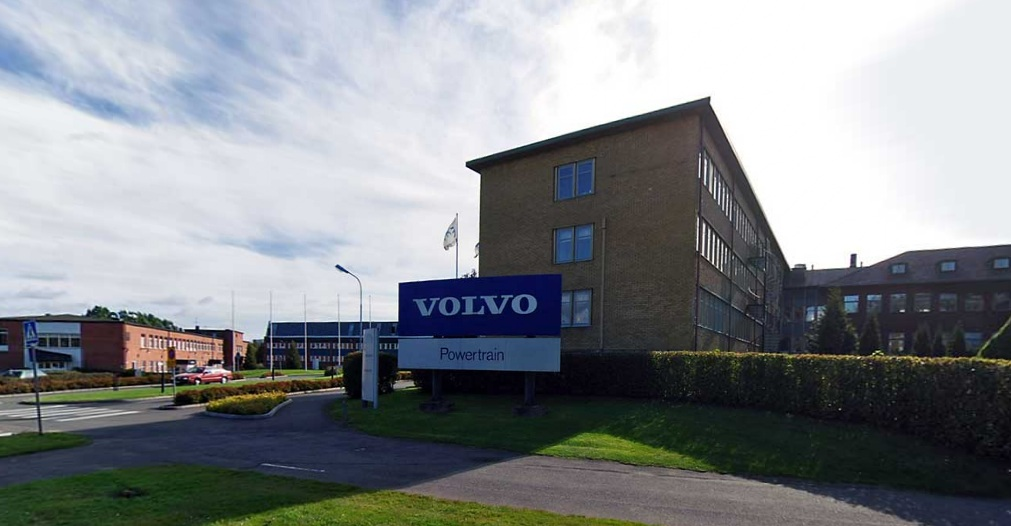
Volvo facility in Skövde

The single largest employer in the municipality is Volvo, with Volvo Powertrain and Volvo Cars together employing approximately 5,000 people.

Other major employers are the hospital (Skaraborg Hospital, serving the Västra Götaland region), the local regiments (among Sweden's largest) and the municipality itself.

== Education ==
University of Skövde is the largest university in the town. It is ranked 21 in the nation's ranking. Informatics and computer science along with Bio-informatics and molecular biology are some of the chief international students picks.

== Demographics ==
This is a demographic table based on Skövde Municipality's electoral districts in the 2022 Swedish general election sourced from SVT's election platform, in turn taken from SCB official statistics.

In total there were 56,973 residents, including 43,681 Swedish citizens of voting age. 46.0% voted for the left coalition and 52.6% for the right coalition. Indicators are in percentage points except population totals and income.

Location	Residents	Citizen adults	Left vote	Right vote	Employed	Swedish parents	Foreign heritage	Income SEK	Degree
Location			%	%					
Aspö/Ulveket	2,299	1,639	49.8	49.0	86	82	18	31,027	58
Berg	1,568	1,243	48.2	50.5	90	93	7	29,517	45
Billingssluttningen	1,976	1,589	47.4	51.9	84	87	13	27,318	51
Centrum V	1,329	1,211	45.5	53.4	80	81	19	23,331	48
Centrum Ö	1,234	1,012	46.9	51.0	57	76	24	17,622	56
Dälderna	1,955	1,477	48.2	50.7	78	77	23	26,557	46
Ekängen	1,734	1,299	41.8	56.9	89	85	15	33,551	60
Frösve/Säter	2,141	1,583	42.3	56.2	88	94	6	29,104	42
Havstena	1,915	1,464	56.1	41.7	71	66	34	21,739	44
Hentorp	1,977	1,529	44.3	55.0	88	90	10	31,096	57
Högskolan/Trängen	1,981	1,533	49.8	47.2	57	71	29	18,163	58
Igelstorp	1,597	1,210	40.8	57.5	90	89	11	28,125	33
Kullen	1,695	1,420	42.7	56.4	80	84	16	26,967	51
Källegården	1,950	1,672	40.9	57.8	83	85	15	28,907	47
Lunden	1,714	1,193	44.6	53.9	84	72	28	28,207	45
Mariesjö	1,665	1,306	48.2	50.4	76	73	27	24,062	44
Norra Ryd	1,817	1,277	53.6	43.8	67	41	59	21,059	30
Norrmalm	1,928	1,651	46.5	52.1	80	82	18	25,002	46
Rosenhaga	1,718	1,277	49.2	49.1	82	72	28	27,341	41
Ryd C	1,903	1,239	63.7	32.9	55	26	74	15,145	24
Skultorp C	1,513	1,114	48.1	50.5	77	82	18	24,755	38
Skultorp NV	1,880	1,360	43.9	55.3	89	90	10	31,786	48
Skultorpsbygden	1,626	1,285	41.7	57.3	89	94	6	30,341	40
Södra Ryd	2,330	1,688	53.3	45.7	78	51	49	25,021	34
Tidan	1,761	1,344	39.0	59.9	78	86	14	23,223	25
Timmersdala	1,273	964	39.2	60.2	88	94	6	26,576	33
Trädgårdsstaden	1,689	1,241	44.7	54.3	88	77	23	33,344	59
Våmb	1,939	1,494	47.1	51.3	88	88	12	30,274	49
Väring	1,906	1,467	38.6	60.5	87	94	6	27,924	31
Värsås	1,645	1,250	38.9	60.2	86	91	9	26,303	30
Västra Fältet	1,589	1,321	44.5	54.4	84	84	16	26,945	48
Östermalm	1,726	1,329	50.4	47.9	78	71	29	26,187	43
Source: SVT

== Elections ==
=== Riksdag ===
These are the local results of the Riksdag elections since the 1972 municipality reform. The results of the Sweden Democrats were not published by SCB between 1988 and 1998 at a municipal level to the party's small nationwide size at the time. "Votes" denotes valid votes, whereas "Turnout" denotes also blank and invalid votes.

Year	Turnout	Votes	V	S	MP	C	L	KD	M	SD	ND
1973	90.6	26,522	3.5	38.0	0.0	30.4	11.1	2.5	14.1	0.0	0.0
1976	91.1	28,509	3.2	37.3	0.0	30.2	12.5	2.0	14.4	0.0	0.0
1979	89.5	26,825	4.4	39.0	0.0	21.7	11.7	2.0	20.1	0.0	0.0
1982	91.0	29,704	4.4	42.3	1.3	19.1	6.4	2.5	23.8	0.0	0.0
1985	89.7	30,232	4.1	43.2	1.4	15.0	15.8	0.0	20.4	0.0	0.0
1988	86.2	29,447	4.7	43.2	5.0	13.2	13.0	3.7	17.1	0.0	0.0
1991	86.8	30,035	3.2	36.5	2.8	9.9	9.2	9.2	20.5	0.0	7.7
1994	87.3	31,015	5.3	44.3	4.9	9.6	7.1	4.7	22.0	0.0	1.3
1998	81.7	29,456	10.5	36.5	3.9	6.3	4.3	15.0	21.9	0.0	0.0
2002	80.6	29,477	7.0	40.9	3.9	7.5	12.2	11.6	14.5	1.0	0.0
2006	82.3	31,006	5.0	37.5	4.0	8.8	6.7	7.4	25.4	3.0	0.0
2010	85.3	33,360	4.7	31.0	6.3	7.5	7.3	6.3	30.3	5.3	0.0
2014	87.1	35,405	4.0	32.8	5.7	7.4	5.5	5.0	23.7	12.7	0.0

Blocs

This lists the relative strength of the socialist and centre-right blocs since 1973, but parties not elected to the Riksdag are inserted as "other", including the Sweden Democrats results from 1988 to 2006, but also the Christian Democrats pre-1991 and the Greens in 1982, 1985 and 1991. The sources are identical to the table above. The coalition or government mandate marked in bold formed the government after the election. New Democracy got elected in 1991 but are still listed as "other" due to the short lifespan of the party. "Elected" is the total number of percentage points from the municipality that went to parties who were elected to the Riksdag.

Year	Turnout	Votes	Left	Right	SD	Other	Elected
1973	90.6	26,522	**41.5**	55.6	0.0	2.9	97.1
1976	91.1	28,509	40.5	**57.1**	0.0	2.4	97.6
1979	89.5	26,825	43.4	**53.5**	0.0	3.1	96.9
1982	91.0	29,704	**46.7**	49.3	0.0	4.0	96.0
1985	89.7	30,232	**47.3**	51.2	0.0	1.1	98.9
1988	86.2	29,447	**52.9**	43.3	0.0	3.8	96.2
1991	86.8	30,035	39.7	**48.8**	0.0	11.5	96.2
1994	87.3	31,015	**54.5**	43.4	0.0	2.1	97.9
1998	81.7	29,456	**50.9**	47.5	0.0	1.6	98.4
2002	80.6	29,477	**51.8**	45.8	0.0	2.4	97.6
2006	82.3	31,006	46.5	**48.3**	0.0	5.2	94.8
2010	85.3	33,360	41.7	**51.4**	5.3	1.6	98.4
2014	87.1	35,405	**42.5**	41.6	12.7	3.2	96.8

== Twin cities ==
- Halden, Norway, since the 1940s
- Ringsted Municipality, Denmark, since the 1940s
- Sastamala, Finland, since the 1940s
- Kuressaare, Estonia, since 1994
- Zhangjiakou，China，since 2015
