= Volvo =

Swedish multinational manufacturing company

Aktiebolaget Volvo
- Type: Aktiebolag
- Traded as: Nasdaq Stockholm: VOLV A, Nasdaq Stockholm: VOLV B OMX Stockholm 30
- ISIN: SE0000115446
- Industry: Automotive
- Founded: 1927; 99 years ago
- Founders: Assar Gabrielsson and Gustav Larson
- Headquarters: Gothenburg, Sweden
- Area served: Worldwide
- Key people: Pär Boman (Chairman); Martin Lundstedt (President & CEO)
- Products: Trucks, buses, construction equipment, marine and industrial engines, customer financing, insurance and related services, product related services
- Brands: Volvo, Volvo Penta, Rokbak, Renault Trucks, Prevost, Nova Bus, Mack (group brands); Eicher, Dongfeng Truck, SDLG, Milence, Cellcentric (partnership brands)
- Revenue: ▼526.816 billion kr (2024)
- Operating income: ▼66.611 billion kr (2024)
- Net income: ▲50.576 billion kr (2024)
- Total assets: ▲714.564 billion kr (2024)
- Total equity: ▲197.361 billion kr (2024)
- Owners: AB Industrivärden (9.4%; 28.0% votes); Geely (4.4%; 14.7% votes)
- Number of employees: ▼102,000 (2024)
- Subsidiaries: Volvo Trucks; Volvo Buses; Volvo Construction Equipment; Volvo Penta; Renault Trucks; Mack Trucks; Volvo Financial Services; Volvo Autonomous Solutions; VE Commercial Vehicles Limited (50%)
- Website: volvogroup.com

Aktiebolaget Volvo ([ˈakːsɪɛbʊˌlɑːɡɛt ˈvɔlːvʊ]; shortened to AB Volvo [ˈoːˈbeː ˈvɔlːvʊ]), doing business as Volvo Group (Swedish: Volvokoncernen, pronounced [ˈvɔlːvʊkɔnˌsæːɳɛn]; stylized as VOLVO) is a Swedish multinational manufacturing corporation headquartered in Gothenburg. While its core activity is the production, distribution and sale of trucks, buses and construction equipment, Volvo also supplies marine and industrial drive systems and financial services. In 2016, it was the world's second-largest manufacturer of heavy-duty trucks through its subsidiary Volvo Trucks.

Volvo was founded in 1927. Initially involved in the automobile industry, Volvo expanded into other manufacturing sectors throughout the twentieth century. Automobile manufacturer Volvo Cars, also based in Gothenburg, was part of AB Volvo until 1999, when it was sold to the Ford Motor Company. Since 2010 Volvo Cars has been owned by the automotive company Geely Holding Group. Both AB Volvo and Volvo Cars share the Volvo logo and cooperate in running the World of Volvo museum in Gothenburg, Sweden.

The corporation was first listed on the Stockholm Stock Exchange in 1935, and was listed on the American NASDAQ from 1985 to 2007. Volvo is one of Sweden's largest companies by market capitalisation and revenue.

== History ==
=== Early years and international expansion ===
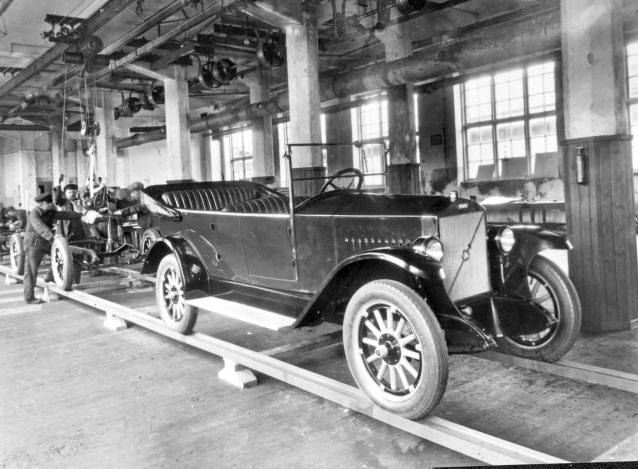
The first Volvo car, a Volvo ÖV 4, left the assembly line on 14 April 1927.

The brand name Volvo was originally registered as a trademark in May 1911, with the intention to be used for a new series of SKF ball bearings. It means "I roll" in Latin, conjugated from "volvere". The idea was short-lived, and SKF decided to simply use its initials as the trademark for all its bearing products.

In 1924, Assar Gabrielsson, an SKF sales manager, and Gustav Larson, a KTH educated engineer, decided to start construction of a Swedish car. They intended to build cars that could withstand the rigours of the country's rough roads and cold temperatures.

AB Volvo began activities on 10 August 1926. After one year of preparations involving the production of ten prototypes, the firm was ready to commence the car-manufacturing business within the SKF group. The Volvo Group considers itself to have started in 1927, when the first car, a Volvo ÖV 4, rolled off the production line at the factory in Hisingen, Gothenburg. Only 280 cars were built that year. The first truck, the "Series 1", debuted in January 1928 as an immediate success, and attracted attention outside the country. In 1930, Volvo sold 639 cars, and the export of trucks to Europe started soon after; the cars did not become well known outside Sweden until after World War II. AB Volvo was introduced at the Stockholm Stock Exchange in 1935 and SKF then decided to sell its shares in the company. By 1942, Volvo acquired the Swedish precision engineering company Svenska Flygmotor (later renamed as Volvo Aero).

Pentaverken, which had manufactured engines for Volvo, was acquired in 1935, providing a secure supply of engines and entry into the marine engine market.

The first bus, named B1, was launched in 1934, and aircraft engines were added to the growing range of products at the beginning of the 1940s. Volvo was also responsible for producing the Stridsvagn m/42. In 1963, Volvo opened the Volvo Halifax Assembly plant, the first assembly plant in the company's history outside of Sweden in Halifax, Nova Scotia, Canada.

In 1950, Volvo acquired the Swedish construction and agricultural equipment manufacturer Bolinder-Munktell. Bolinder-Munktell was renamed as Volvo BM in 1973. In 1979, Volvo BM's agricultural equipment business was sold to Valmet. Later, through restructuring and acquisitions, the remaining construction equipment business became Volvo Construction Equipment.

In the 1970s, Volvo started to move away from car manufacturing to concentrate more on heavy commercial vehicles. The car division focused on models aimed at upper middle-class customers to improve its profitability.

=== Partnerships and merging attempts ===
In 1977, Volvo tried to combine operations with rival Swedish automotive group Saab-Scania, but the latter company rejected it.

Between 1978 and 1981, Volvo acquired Beijerinvest, a trading company involved in the oil, food, and finance businesses. In 1981, those sectors represented about three-quarters of Volvo's revenue, while the automotive sector amounted for most of the rest. In 1982, the company completed the acquisition of White Motor Corporation's assets.

In the early 1970s, French manufacturer Renault and Volvo started to collaborate. In 1978, Volvo Car Corporation was spun off as a separate company within the Volvo group and Renault acquired a minority stake, before selling it back in the 1980s after a restructuring. In the 1990s, Renault and Volvo deepened their collaboration and both companies partnered in purchasing, research and development and quality control while increasing their cross-ownership. Renault would assist Volvo with entry-level and medium segment vehicles and in return, Volvo would share technology with Renault in upper segments. In 1993, a 1994 Volvo-Renault merger deal was announced. The deal was barely accepted in France, but it was opposed in Sweden, and the Volvo shareholders and company board voted against it. The alliance was officially dissolved in February 1994 and Volvo sold off its minority stake in Renault in 1997. In the 1990s, Volvo also divested from most of its activities outside vehicles and engines.

In 1991, the Volvo Group participated in a joint venture with Japanese automaker Mitsubishi Motors at the former DAF plant in Born, Netherlands. The operation, branded NedCar, began producing the first generation Mitsubishi Carisma alongside the Volvo S40/V40 in 1996. During the 1990s, Volvo also partnered with the American manufacturer General Motors. In 1999, the European Union blocked a merger with Scania AB. Israel's Merkavim is partly owned by Volvo.

=== Refocusing on heavy vehicles ===
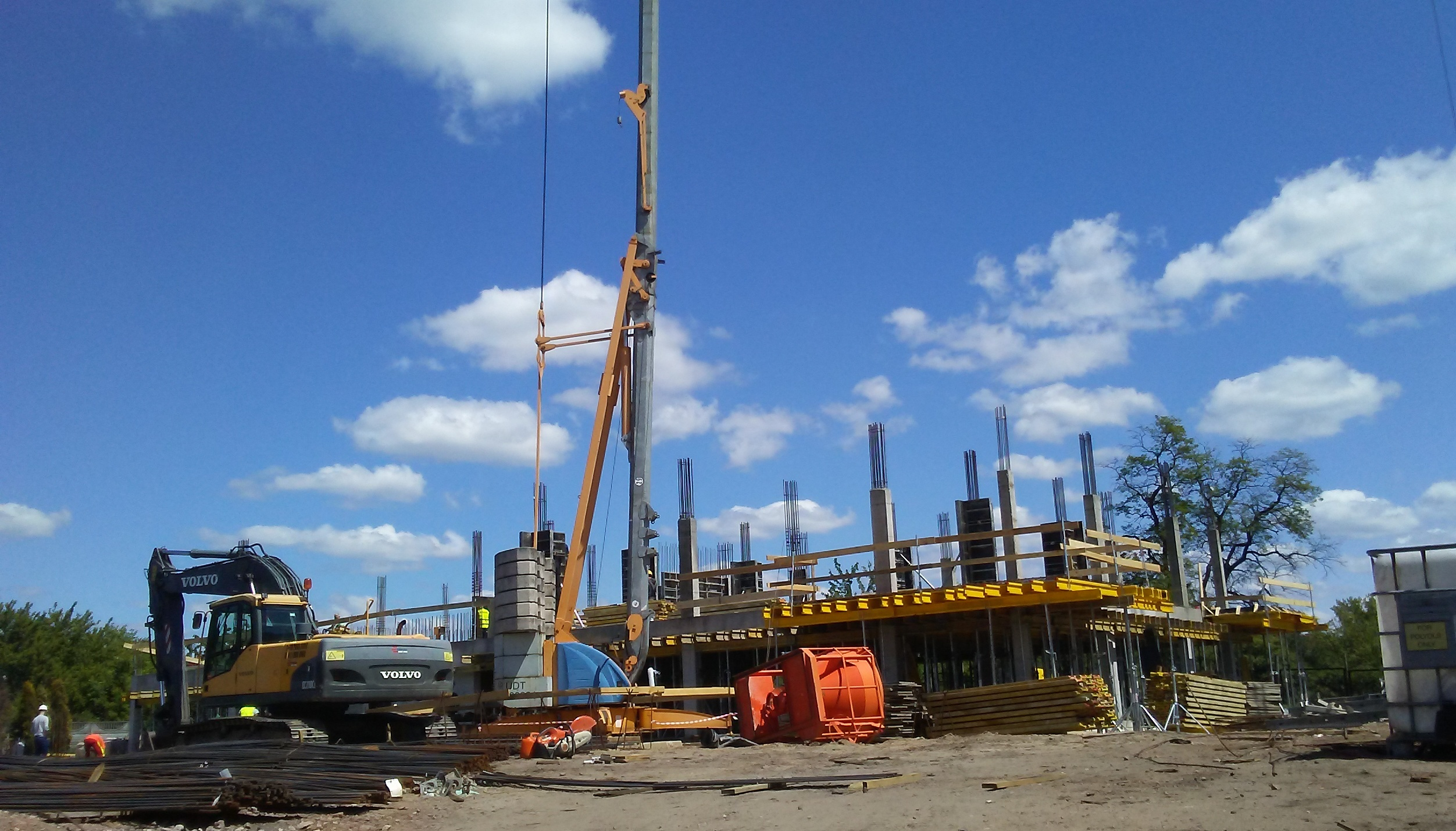
Volvo excavator on construction site in Tomaszów Mazowiecki, Poland

In January 1999, Volvo Group sold Volvo Car Corporation to Ford Motor Company for $6.45 billion. The division was placed within Ford's Premier Automotive Group alongside Jaguar, Land Rover and Aston Martin. Volvo engineering resources and components would be used in various Ford, Land Rover and Aston Martin products, with the second generation Land Rover Freelander designed on the same platform as the second generation Volvo S80. The Volvo T5 petrol engine was used in the Ford Focus ST and RS performance models, and Volvo's satellite navigation system was used on certain Aston Martin Vanquish, DB9 and V8 Vantage models. In November 1999, Volvo Group purchased a 5% stake in Mitsubishi Motors, as part of a partnership deal for the truck and bus business. In 2001, after DaimlerChrysler bought a large stake in Mitsubishi Motors, Volvo sold its shares to the former.

Renault Véhicules Industriels (which included Mack Trucks, but not Renault's stake in Irisbus) was sold to Volvo during January 2001, and Volvo renamed it Renault Trucks in 2002. Renault became AB Volvo's biggest shareholder, with a 19.9% stake (in shares and voting rights) as part of the deal. Renault increased its shareholding to 21.7% by 2010.

AB Volvo acquired 13% of the shares in the Japanese truck manufacturer Nissan Diesel (later renamed UD Trucks) from Nissan (part of the Renault-Nissan Alliance) during 2006, becoming a major shareholder. Volvo Group took complete ownership of Nissan Diesel in 2007 to extend its presence in the Asian Pacific market.

Renault sold 14.9% of its stake in AB Volvo in October 2010 (comprising 14.9% of the share capital and 3.8% of the voting rights) for €3.02 billion. This share sale left Renault with around 17.5% of Volvo's voting rights. Renault sold their remaining shares in December 2012 (comprising 6.5% of the share capital and 17.2% of the voting rights at the time of transaction) for €1.6 billion, leaving Swedish industrial investment group Aktiebolaget Industrivärden as the largest shareholder, with 6.2% of the share capital and 18.7% of the voting rights. That same year, Volvo sold Volvo Aero to the British company GKN. In 2017 Volvo Cars owner Geely became the largest Volvo shareholder by number of shares after acquiring an 8.2% stake, displacing Industrivärden. Industrivärden kept more voting rights than Geely (Geely getting 15.8% of voting rights).

In December 2013, Volvo sold its Volvo Construction Equipment Rents division to Platinum Equity. In November 2016, Volvo announced its intention of divesting its Government Sales division, made up mainly of Renault Trucks' Renault Trucks Defense but also of Panhard, ACMAT, Mack Defense in the United States, and Volvo Defense. The project for selling the division was later abandoned and, in May 2018, Volvo reorganized Renault Trucks Defense and renamed it Arquus.

In December 2018, Volvo announced it intended to sell a 75.1% controlling stake of its car telematics subsidiary WirelessCar to Volkswagen with the aim of focusing on telematics for commercial vehicles. The sale was completed in March 2019.

In December 2019, Volvo and Isuzu announced their intention of forming a strategic alliance on commercial vehicles. As part of the agreement, Volvo would sell UD Trucks to Isuzu. The "final agreements" for the alliance were signed in October 2020, with the UD Trucks sale to be finalized pending regulatory clearances. The sale was completed in April 2021.

In the early 2020s, Volvo partnered with other manufacturers to deploy infrastructure for non-hydrocarbon energies. In April 2020, Volvo and Daimler (later Daimler Truck) announced that the former planned to acquire half of Daimler's fuel cell business, forming a joint venture between the two companies. In March 2021, the fuel cell business was reorganised as a joint venture called Cellcentric. In December 2021, Volvo, Daimler Truck, and Traton agreed to the formation of an equally owned joint venture aimed to build an electric vehicle charging network for heavy vehicles in Europe. In December 2022, the joint venture (called Commercial Vehicle Charging Europe) began operations under the trade name of Milence.

In April 2021, Volvo announced that it had signed up a new partnership with steel manufacturer SSAB to develop fossil fuel-free steel for future use in Volvo's vehicles. The partnership is derived from SSAB's own green steel venture, HYBRIT.

In November 2023, Volvo acquired Proterra's battery business for US$210 million.

Volvo has announced that it is developing trucks with combustion engines that run on hydrogen. Commercial tests will begin in early 2026.

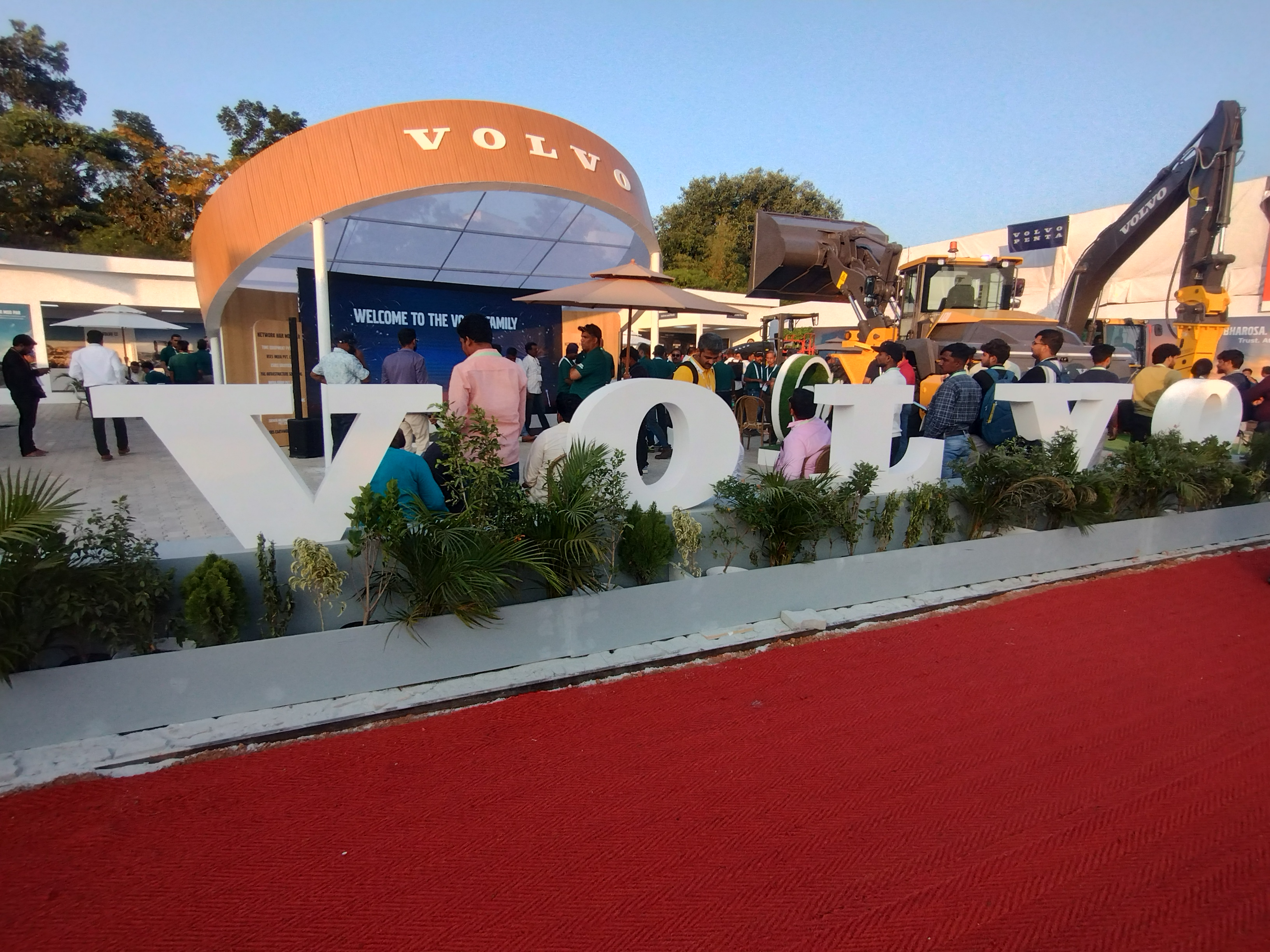
Volvo at EXCON 2025, BIEC

== Corporate ==
=== Business ===
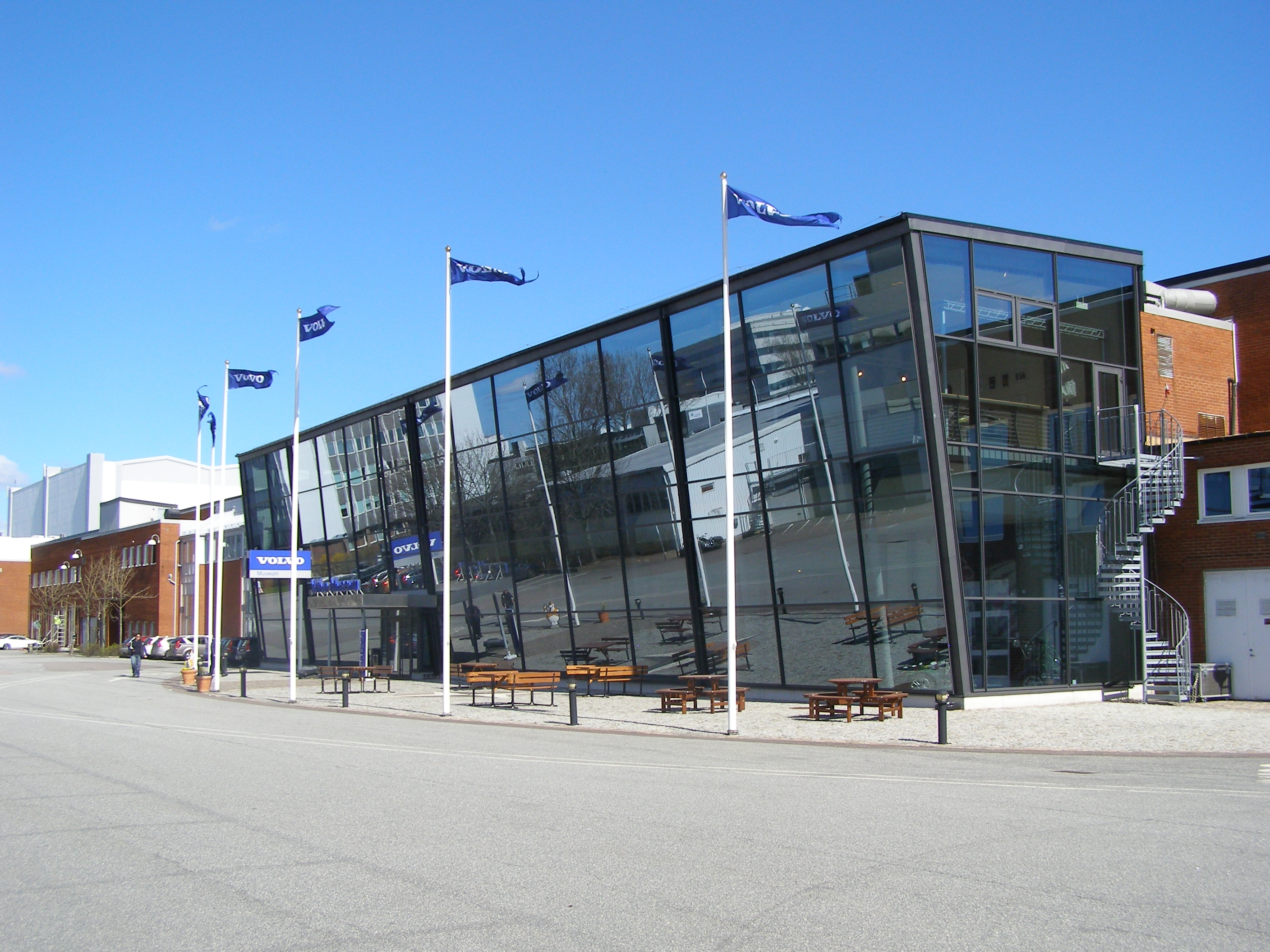
Volvo Museum in Gothenburg

Volvo Group's operations include:

- Volvo Trucks (midsize-duty trucks for regional transportation and heavy-duty trucks for long-distance transportation, as well as heavy-duty trucks for the construction work segment)
- Mack Trucks (light-duty trucks for close distribution and heavy-duty trucks for long-distance transportation)
- Renault Trucks (heavy-duty trucks for regional transportations and heavy-duty trucks for the construction work segment)
- Arquus (military vehicles)
- Dongfeng Commercial Vehicles (45% ownership) (trucks)
- VE Commercial Vehicles Limited Ltd., India (VECV), a joint venture between Volvo Group and Eicher Motors Limited in which Volvo holds 45.6% ownership (trucks and buses)
- Volvo Construction Equipment (construction equipment)
- SDLG (70% ownership) (construction equipment)
- Volvo Group Venture Capital (corporate investment company)
- Volvo Buses (complete buses and bus chassis for city traffic, line traffic and tourist traffic)
- Volvo Financial Services (customer financing, inter-group banking, as real estate administration)
- Volvo Penta (marine engine systems for leisure boats and commercial shipping, diesel engines and drive systems for industrial applications)
- Volvo Energy (management and support for electric vehicles, batteries and electrification networks)

According to the company, in 2021 almost two-thirds (62%) of its revenue came from trucks and services related to them. Second came construction equipment (25%), and the rest was from buses, marine engines, and minor operations, each of them contributing less than 5%.

=== Production facilities ===
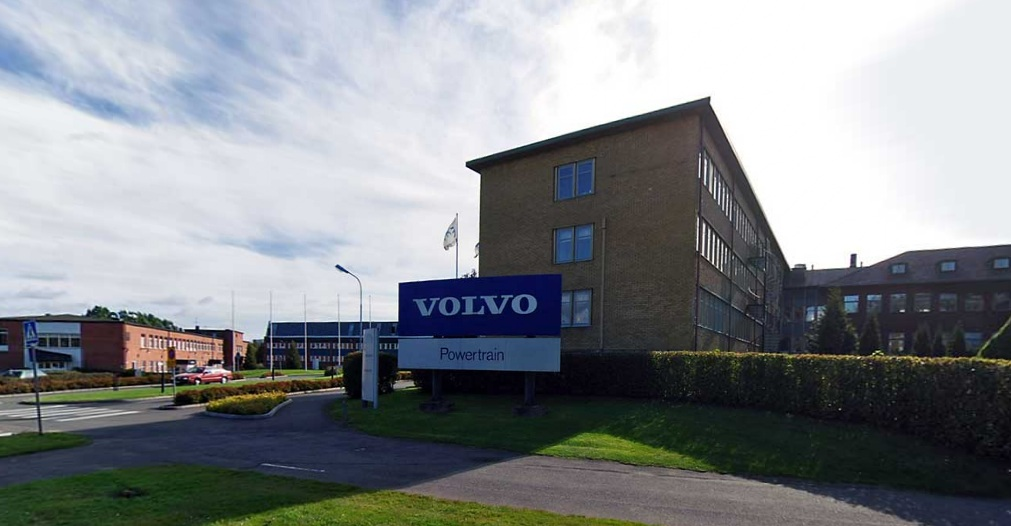
Volvo powertrain facilities in Skövde, pictured in 2010

Volvo has various production facilities. As of 2022, it has plants in 19 countries, with 10 other countries having independent assemblers of Volvo products. The company also has product development, distribution, and logistics centers. Its first plant for vehicle assembly, on the Hisingen island, was owned by SKF until it was made part of the Volvo company in 1930. That year, Volvo acquired its supplier of engines in Skövde (Pentavarken). In 1942, Volvo acquired its supplier of transmissions, Köpings Mekaniska Verkstad, located in the town of Köping. In 1954, Volvo built a new truck assembly plant in Gothenburg and, in 1959–1964, a car assembly plant in Torslanda. The first truly branched-off Volvo plant was the Floby gearbox plant (100 kilometers to the northeast of Gothenburg), incorporated in 1958. In the 1960s and early 1970s, Volvo and its assembly partners opened plants in Canada, Belgium, Malaysia, and Australia. In the early part of that period Volvo also started to venture into vehicles other than passenger cars and road-going commercial vehicles by acquiring the Eskilstuna plant (Bolinder-Munktell). From the 1970s onwards, Volvo set up various facilities in Bengtsfors, Lindesberg, Vara, Tanumshede, Färgelanda, and Borås, most of them within a 150-kilometer radius of Gothenburg, and gradually acquired the Dutch DAF car plants. It also established its first South American plant in Curitiba, Brazil.

From the mid-1970s onwards, Volvo began building assembly plants with smaller assembly lines, more worker-centric and with better use of automation, no longer adhering to Fordism. These were Kalmar (car assembly, built in 1974), Tuve (truck assembly, 1982) and Uddevalla (car assembly, 1989). Kalmar and Uddevalla were closed down in the early 1990s, following yearly losses. The Tuve plant (called the LB plant) replaced the Gothenburg plant (X plant) for truck assembly through the 1980s, as the former could produce more technologically complex models. In 1982, Volvo gained its first plant in the United States, the New River Valley plant in Dublin, Virginia, after acquiring the assets of the White Motor Corporation. Starting in the late 1980s, Volvo expanded its limited bus production capabilities through acquisitions in various countries (Swedish Saffle Karroseri, Danish Aabenraa, German Drögmöller Karroserien, Canadian Prévost Car, Finnish Carrus, American Nova Bus, Mexican Mexicana de Autobuses). In the late 1990s, after a short-lived joint venture with Polish manufacturer Jelcz, Volvo built its main bus production hub for Europe in Wrocław. In the 1990s, Volvo also increased its construction equipment assets by acquiring the Swedish company Åkerman and the construction equipment division of Samsung Heavy Industries. In 1998, the company opened an assembly facility for its three main heavy product lines (trucks, construction equipment, and buses) near Bengaluru, India.

Volvo sold all its car manufacturing assets in 1999.

Following the acquisition of Renault Véhicules Industriels and Nissan Diesel in the 2000s, Volvo gained various production facilities in Europe, North America, and Asia.

In 2014, Volvo's Volvo Construction Equipment acquired the haul truck manufacturing division of Terex Corporation, which included five truck models and a manufacturing facility in Motherwell, Scotland.

Volvo production sites as of October 2022
Company	Plants
Volvo Trucks	Sweden: Tuve (trucks, parts), Umeå (cabs), Köping (transmissions), Skövde (engines); Belgium: Ghent (trucks, parts); Russia: Kaluga^{□} (trucks); South Africa: Durban (trucks); India: Bengaluru (trucks); Thailand: Bangkok (trucks); Australia: Brisbane^{A.} (trucks); United States: New River Valley (trucks, parts); Brazil: Curitiba (trucks, engines)
Renault Trucks	France: Blainville-sur-Orne^{B.} (trucks, cabs), Lyon (stamped parts), Bourg-en-Bresse (trucks), Vénissieux (engines); France (Arquus): Garchizy (repair of materiel, parts), Marolles-en-Hurepoix (military vehicle assembly, repairing, retrofitting), Saint-Nazaire (assembly support), Limoges (production management)
Mack Trucks	United States: Hagerstown (engines), Lehigh Valley (trucks), Middletown (remanufacturing)
Volvo Construction Equipment	Sweden: Arvika (large wheel loaders), Braås (articulated haulers), Eskilstuna (transaxles), Hallsberg (cabs, tanks); Germany: Konz-Könen (excavators, compact wheel loaders), Hameln (road building machinery); France: Belley (compact excavators); United Kingdom (Terex, Rokbak brand): Motherwell (rigid and articulated haulers); South Korea: Changwon (excavators, demolition equipment, pipelayers); India: Bengaluru (excavators, rigid and articulated haulers, wheel loaders, road building machinery, parts); China: Shanghai (excavators); United States: Shippensburg (compact wheel loaders, road building machinery); Brazil: Pederneiras^{C.} (articulated haulers, large wheel loaders, soil compactors, crawler excavators)
Volvo Buses	Sweden: Borås (chassis), Uddevalla (frames); Poland: Wrocław (buses); Canada (Prévost, Nova Bus): Sainte-Claire (buses), Saint-Eustache (buses), Saint-François-du-Lac (chassis); India: Bengaluru (chassis, engines); Brasil: Curitiba (chassis, engines); Mexico: Mexico City (buses); United States (Nova Bus): Plattsburgh (buses)
VE Commercial Vehicles	India: Pithampur (trucks, engines, transmissions)
Dongfeng Truck	China: Shiyan (trucks)
SDLG	China: Linyi (compact excavators, large wheel loaders, soil compactors, asphalt pavers)
Volvo Penta	Sweden: Gothenburg, Vara; China: Shanghai; United States: Lexington
Notes
Minority owned by Volvo.: ^{□} Production "suspended".; ^{A.} It also produces Mack Trucks-badged vehicles.; ^{B.} It also produces Volvo Trucks and DAF-badged vehicles.; ^{C.} It also produces SDLG-badged vehicles.

=== Trademark ===
Volvo Trademark Holding AB is equally owned by AB Volvo and Volvo Car Corporation.

The main activity of the company is to own, maintain, protect and preserve the Volvo trademarks, including Volvo, the Volvo branding symbols (grille slash and iron mark), and Volvo Penta, on behalf of its owners and to license these rights to its owners. Its day-to-day work is focused upon maintaining the global portfolio of trademark registrations, and to extend sufficiently the scope of registered protection for Volvo trademarks. It also acts against unauthorised registration and use (including counterfeiting) of trademarks identical or similar to the Volvo trademarks on a global basis.

== Collaboration with universities and colleges ==
Volvo has strategic collaborations for purposes of research and recruitment with a number of colleges and universities, such as Penn State University, INSA Lyon, EMLYON Business School, NC State University, Sophia University, Chalmers University of Technology, The Gothenburg School of Business, Economics and Law at the University of Gothenburg, Mälardalen University College, and the University of Skövde.

In 2019, Volvo partnered with Nanyang Technological University (NTU), SMRT, and the Land Transport Authority (LTA) in Singapore to unveil the first 12-meter fully electric autonomous bus which was set to be tested at NTU in Singapore before extending the route beyond the university campus.

== Communication campaigns ==
In November 2013, Volvo Trucks enlisted Jean-Claude Van Damme to perform a split between two moving trucks in reverse. The goal of this campaign, titled "Epic Split," was to demonstrate the stability and precision of its "Dynamic Steering" model. In just three weeks, the video went viral, garnering over 61 million views on YouTube.

Two years after the "Epic Split", Volvo Trucks aimed to demonstrate the durability of one of its trucks by handing over the controls to a four-year-old girl named Sophie. Conceptualized by the Swedish agency Forsman and Bodenfors, the widely shared video clip features Sophie using a remote control to navigate the truck through various obstacles, showcasing the vehicle's robustness and precision.

== Controversies ==
=== Israeli ties during the Gaza war ===
Volvo has provided heavy construction equipment, specifically excavators and bulldozers, through authorized dealers that have been deployed in destroying Palestinian residences and public facilities, with incidents documented in East Jerusalem and communities such as Umm al-Khair and Hebron. Although Volvo maintains that these vehicles were purchased by intermediaries and meant for civilian applications, a United Nations expert investigation determined the company bears substantial responsibility for enabling "the displacement system" and cautions that inactive suppliers transform into active participants in occupation-related activities. According to UN experts, corporations can be held liable when providing assistance or enter into trade dealings with Israel, as it commits war crimes and forced displacement against Palestinians.

== See also ==
- Port of Gothenburg
- List of companies involved in the Gaza war
