= Sun Odyssey 37 =

Sailboat class

Development
- Designer: Jacques Fauroux
- Location: France
- Year: 1998
- Builder: Jeanneau
- Role: Cruiser
- Name: Sun Odyssey 37

Boat
- Displacement: 14,175 lb (6,430 kg)
- Draft: 6.33 ft (1.93 m)

Hull
- Type: monohull
- Construction: fiberglass
- LOA: 37.44 ft (11.41 m)
- LWL: 31.75 ft (9.68 m)
- Beam: 12.08 ft (3.68 m)
- Engine: Volvo 29 hp (22 kW) diesel engine

Hull appendages
- Keel: fin keel with weighted bulb
- Ballast: 4,453 lb (2,020 kg)
- Rudder: spade-type rudder

Rig
- Rig type: Bermuda rig
- I foretriangle height: 44.78 ft (13.65 m)
- J foretriangle base: 12.53 ft (3.82 m)
- P mainsail luff: 39.04 ft (11.90 m)
- E mainsail foot: 13.91 ft (4.24 m)

Sails
- Sailplan: masthead sloop
- Mainsail area: 271.52 sq ft (25.225 m^{2})
- Jib/genoa area: 280.55 sq ft (26.064 m^{2})
- Total sail area: 552.07 sq ft (51.289 m^{2})

Racing
- PHRF: 138-153

The Sun Odyssey 37 is a French sailboat that was designed by Jacques Fauroux as a cruiser and yacht charter boat and first built in 1998.

The design was also sold as the Moorings 37 for service with Moorings Yacht Charter. It was also developed into the Sun Fast 37 cruiser-racer in 2000.

The boat may be confused with Fauroux's earlier 1994 Sun Odyssey 37.1 and 1996 Sun Odyssey 37.2 designs.

== Production ==
The design was built by Jeanneau in France, starting in 1998, but it is now out of production.

== Design ==
The Sun Odyssey 37 is a recreational keelboat, built predominantly of fiberglass, with hardwood structural stringers. It has a masthead sloop rig, a raked stem, a reverse transom, an internally mounted spade-type rudder controlled by a wheel and a fixed fin keel with a weighted bulb or optional shoal draft keel. It displaces 14,175 lb (6,430 kg) and carries 4,453 lb (2,020 kg) of iron ballast.

The boat has a draft of 6.33 ft (1.93 m) with the standard fin keel or 4.75 ft (1.45 m) with the optional shoal draft keel.

The boat is fitted with a Swedish Volvo diesel engine of 29 hp (22 kW) for docking and maneuvering. The fuel tank holds 30 U.S. gallons (110 L; 25 imp gal) and the fresh water tank has a capacity of 70 U.S. gallons (260 L; 58 imp gal).

The design has sleeping accommodation for four to six people, with two and three cabin interior layouts. Both versions have a double "V"-berth in the bow cabin, a U-shaped settee and a straight settee in the main cabin. The two cabin model has a single aft cabin with a double berth on the starboard side, while the three cabin model has two aft cabins, each with double berths. The galley is located on the port side just forward of the companionway ladder. The galley is L-shaped and is equipped with a two-burner stove, an ice box and a double sink. A navigation station is opposite the galley, on the port side. The head is located just aft of the navigation station on the port side. Cabin headroom is 75 in (191 cm).

The design has a hull speed of 7.55 kn (13.98 km/h) and a PHRF handicap of 138 to 153.

== Operational history ==
In a 2000 review for Practical Sailor, Darrell Nicholson wrote, "Because we were singlehanding, we appreciated the optional in-mast mainsail furler, and standard headsail furler. Both sails were flying within 30 seconds of reaching the sailing grounds, assisted by a pedestal lock that held the boat on a straight course. Sailing in 5-11 knots of wind, we managed to sail closehauled at 4.5-5.3 knots. The helm is very responsive and the boat accelerates quickly out of a tack. The 37 sails to within 35°-40° of apparent wind and the compass indicated she tacks through 85°-90°. We reached similar speeds on a close reach and discovered that she'll bury her shoulder and sprint forward at 120° of apparent wind. However, we think the boat is capable of significantly better performance. Our test boat was even more undercanvassed than the standard rig; the in-mast mainsail furler necessarily results in a small, roachless mainsail, and the genoa furler was tacked 26″ above the deck. We'd prefer to pile on the sail and reef when necessary; we would especially like to sail this boat fully crewed with a spinnaker in steady 20 knot breezes."

Matthew Sheahan wrote a 2000 review for Yachting World and stated, "The masthead rig means that there is a large overlapping headsail to handle, which also means that someone in the crew is bound to get some upper body exercise as soon as the boat goes upwind. Once wound up onto the breeze during our test, the Jeanneau Sun Odyssey 37 bowled along at around 5.8 knots in 12-14 true and a flat sea. She felt pleasantly slippery, accelerating to slight increases in breeze but without ever feeling like she was about to misbehave. Her wheel was large enough to provide good visibility forward and her gear ratio felt spot on, giving good feel through the helm."

== See also ==
- List of sailing boat types
