= Sun Odyssey 37.1 =

Sailboat class

Development
- Designer: Jacques Fauroux
- Location: France
- Year: 1994
- Builder: Jeanneau
- Role: Cruiser
- Name: Sun Odyssey 37.1

Boat
- Displacement: 13,228 lb (6,000 kg)
- Draft: 6.14 ft (1.87 m)

Hull
- Type: monohull
- Construction: fiberglass
- LOA: 37.40 ft (11.40 m)
- LWL: 31.82 ft (9.70 m)
- Beam: 12.76 ft (3.89 m)
- Engine: 27 or 50 hp (20 or 37 kW) diesel engine

Hull appendages
- Keel: fin keel with weighted bulb
- Ballast: 4,299 lb (1,950 kg)
- Rudder: skeg-mounted rudder

Rig
- Rig type: Bermuda rig
- I foretriangle height: 45.28 ft (13.80 m)
- J foretriangle base: 13.12 ft (4.00 m)
- P mainsail luff: 39.37 ft (12.00 m)
- E mainsail foot: 15.09 ft (4.60 m)

Sails
- Sailplan: masthead sloop
- Mainsail area: 297.05 sq ft (27.597 m^{2})
- Jib/genoa area: 297.04 sq ft (27.596 m^{2})
- Total sail area: 594.08 sq ft (55.192 m^{2})

Racing
- PHRF: 138-153

The Sun Odyssey 37.1 and Sun Odyssey 37.2 are a series of French sailboats that were designed by Jacques Fauroux as cruisers and first built in 1994. Both boats use the same hull design.

The Sun Odyssey 37.1 and 37.2 are often confused with Fauroux's similarly-named, but later 1998 Sun Odyssey 37 design.

== Production ==
The Sun Odyssey 37.1 was built by Jeanneau in France, from 1994 to 1996, while the Sun Odyssey 37.2 was built from 1996 to 1998. Both are now out of production.

== Design ==
The Sun Odyssey 37.1 and 37.2 are recreational keelboats, built predominantly of fiberglass, with wood trim. They have masthead sloop rigs, raked stems, reverse transoms, a skeg-mounted rudder controlled by a wheel and a fixed fin keel or optional shoal-draft keel. The fin keel model displaces 13,228 lb (6,000 kg) and carries 4,299 lb (1,950 kg) of ballast, while the shoal keel version carries 4,784 lb (2,170 kg) of ballast.

The boats have drafts of 6.14 ft (1.87 m) with the standard keel and 4.83 ft (1.47 m) with the optional shoal draft keel.

The boats are fitted with a diesel engine of 27 or 50 hp (20 or 37 kW) for docking and maneuvering. The fuel tank holds 37 U.S. gallons (140 L; 31 imp gal) and the fresh water tank has a capacity of 95 U.S. gallons (360 L; 79 imp gal).

The designs both have sleeping accommodation for six people, with a double "V"-berth in the bow cabin, a U-shaped settee and a straight settee on the starboard side of the main cabin and two aft cabins with a double berth in each. The galley is located on the port side, amidships. The galley has a straight configuration and is equipped with a two-burner stove, an ice box and a double sink. A navigation station is located aft, on the starboard side. There are two heads, one in the bow cabin on the starboard and one on the port side, aft cabin.

The Sun Odyssey 37.2 has a PHRF handicap of 138 to 153.

== See also ==
- List of sailing boat types
