= Sun Fast 37 =

Sailboat class

Development
- Designer: Jacques Fauroux
- Location: France
- Year: 2000
- Builder: Jeanneau
- Role: Cruiser-Racer
- Name: Sun Fast 37

Boat
- Displacement: 13,779 lb (6,250 kg)
- Draft: 6.79 ft (2.07 m)

Hull
- Type: monohull
- Construction: fiberglass
- LOA: 37.40 ft (11.40 m)
- LWL: 31.50 ft (9.60 m)
- Beam: 12.14 ft (3.70 m)
- Engine: Volvo Penta MD2030 56 hp (42 kW) diesel engine

Hull appendages
- Keel: fin keel with weighted bulb
- Ballast: 4,497 lb (2,040 kg)
- Rudder: spade-type rudder

Rig
- Rig type: Bermuda rig
- I foretriangle height: 46.33 ft (14.12 m)
- J foretriangle base: 12.75 ft (3.89 m)
- P mainsail luff: 43.25 ft (13.18 m)
- E mainsail foot: 15.58 ft (4.75 m)

Sails
- Sailplan: fractional rigged sloop
- Mainsail area: 336.92 sq ft (31.301 m^{2})
- Jib/genoa area: 295.35 sq ft (27.439 m^{2})
- Total sail area: 632.27 sq ft (58.740 m^{2})

Racing
- PHRF: 102-120

The Sun Fast 37 is a French sailboat that was designed by Jacques Fauroux as a racer-cruiser and first built in 2000.

The design is a more racing-oriented development of Fauroux's 1998 Sun Odyssey 37, with a taller rig and a deeper keel.

== Production ==
The design was built by Jeanneau in France, starting in 2000, but it is now out of production.

== Design ==
The Sun Fast 37 is a recreational keelboat, built predominantly of fiberglass, with wood trim. It has a fractional sloop rig, a raked stem, a reverse transom an internally mounted spade-type rudder controlled by a wheel and a fixed fin keel with a weighted bulb. It displaces 13,779 lb (6,250 kg) and carries 4,497 lb (2,040 kg) of ballast.

The boat has a draft of 6.79 ft (2.07 m) with the standard keel.

The boat is fitted with a Swedish Volvo Penta MD2030 diesel engine of 56 hp (42 kW) for docking and maneuvering. The fuel tank holds 36 U.S. gallons (140 L; 30 imp gal) and the fresh water tank has a capacity of 84 U.S. gallons (320 L; 70 imp gal).

The design has sleeping accommodation for six people in three cabins, with a double "V"-berth in the bow cabin, a U-shaped settee and a straight settee in the main cabin and two aft cabin, each with a double berth. A two cabin interior has just one larger aft cabin on the port side. The galley is located on the port side just forward of the companionway ladder. The galley is L-shaped and is equipped with a two-burner stove, an ice box and a double sink. A navigation station is opposite the galley, on the starboard side. The head is located aft on the starboard side. On the two cabin layout the head is larger and includes a shower.

The design has a hull speed of 7.52 kn (13.93 km/h) and a PHRF handicap of 102 to 120.

== Operational history ==
The boat was at one time supported by a class club that organized racing events, the Sun Fast Association.

In a 2015 review for Boats.com, Rupert Holmes wrote, "this Jacques Fauroux designed 37-footer helped to set new standards in accommodation in cruising boats of this size when it was first launched at the very end of the 1990s. In addition, it also provided reasonable sailing performance, especially in the Sun Fast version, which offered a deep bulb keel with a draught of 2.07m allied to a larger rig. As a result both models proved popular, with production continuing for some seven years."

== See also ==
- List of sailing boat types
