= Sisu S-321 =

Sisu S-321, S-322, S-323, S-341 and S-342
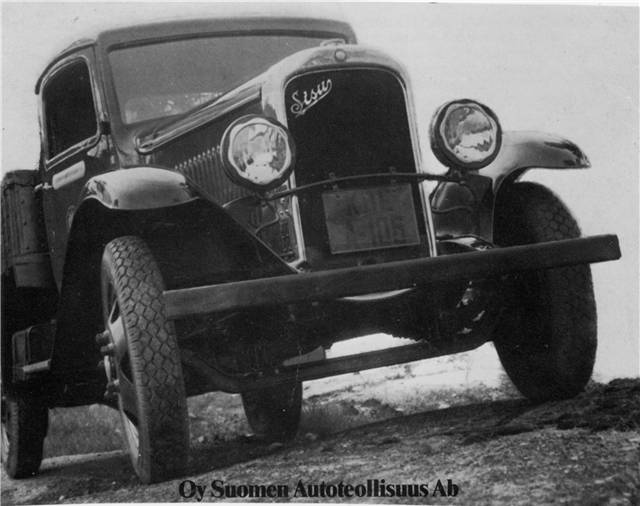
- One of the first S-321's.

Overview
- Manufacturer: Oy Suomen Autoteollisuus Ab
- Production: 1932–1934
- Assembly: Helsinki, Finland

Body and chassis
- Body style: lorry; bus; combination bus
- Layout: 4×2

Powertrain
- Engine: Penta DC: 75 hp Penta EB: 65 hp Olympia: 75 hp

Dimensions
- Wheelbase: S-321: 3,400 mm S-322: 4,100 mm S-323: 3,800 mm
- Kerb weight: S-321 and S-322: 2,300–4,800 kg (5,071–10,582 lb)

Chronology
- Successor: Sisu SO-series

Sisu S-321, S-322 and S-323 is the first lorry and bus model series made by the Finnish heavy vehicle producer Suomen Autoteollisuus (SAT) in 1932–1934. Upgraded models S-341 and S-342 were produced in 1934. The vehicles were heavily based on Volvo components. The two-axle, 4×2-driven lorries were designated with 2,500 kg capacity and total weight of 4,800 kg.

The series was followed by the 1934 introduced Sisu SO-models.

== Background ==
Autoteollisuus-Bilindustri, one of the two predecessors of SAT, had plans about starting automotive industry in Finland. In 1929 the company started negotiations about component supply with the Swedish AB Volvo. Autoteollisuus-Bilindustri made an agreement of equipping lorry Volvo-delivered chassis by locally built cabin and platform. Some chassis were delivered to Autoteollisuus-Bilindustri but the vehicles were not even started before the company put together its operations with its competitor Autokoritehdas, creating SAT. The chassis became owned by SAT thereafter.

In early summer 1932 SAT announced on main Finnish newspapers starting vehicle production and in the same context set up a competition to select a suitable brand for the products. Eventually, name Sisu ("stamina; persistence; guts; stubbornness") became selected.

In the introduced model nomenclature the first two numbers 32 or 34 mean the year of introduction (1932 or 1934) and the following number indicates the wheelbase. E at the end means that the vehicle is equipped with single rear wheels and D stands for double rear wheels; this designation was borrowed from Volvo.

== Production ==
=== Pre-series ===
The size of the first Sisu batch remains unclear. According to some sources the first series included 12 vehicles but most likely three of them are actually belong to the production series delivered in the following year. According to the existing sources, the first Sisu's were a series of nine vehicles of which seven were S-323 models built on Volvo LV-66 chassis. Four of these were delivered to the Finnish Defence Forces' Logistics Battalion 1 in Helsinki, two to Logistics Battalion 2 in Viipuri and one unit was handed over to Rovaniemi Infrastructure and Hydro Engineering Bureau. One unit of the series, S-321E based on Volvo LV-71E chassis, was used for displaying.

The ninth vehicle was S-322D with a bus coach; this was built on Volvo LV-72D chassis. This very first Sisu bus was handed over to a Helsinki bus operator in September 1932; during the first two months in service the bus did total 20,000 km which was a significant achievement taking into account the generally poor condition of the Finnish roads back then.

=== Production series ===
In spring 1933 the first production series was delivered. Among the first customers were newly founded Oy Alkoholiliike Ab which had ordered two S-322D lorries already in the previous year, as well as a Helsinki firewood distributor, which became an owner of S-321E.

SAT ordered Volvo parts in order lots of ten kits. Each production batch was numbered according to the order lot.

The second production series included two combination buses; one ready lorry was converted into combination bus after request of the customer, Imatran Voima Oy. The rest of the second series were exclusively lorries. The customers of the third series were Border Guard, Hietalahti Shipyard and Engineering Works, State Railways, Oy Alkoholiliike Ab, Orimattilan Tehdas and Karhula Oy; the State Railways bought three lorries and Karhula two.

At this stage SAT had got already so many orders that the customers had to wait for their vehicles.

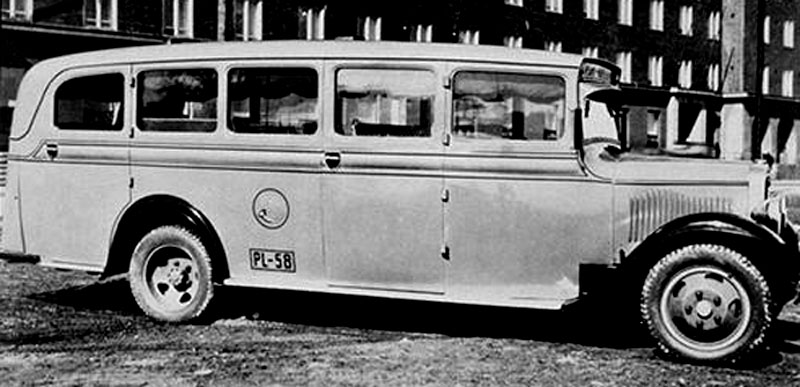
Sisu S-322 bus from 1934. At this stage the degree of locally produced components was already high.

Both high tolls and transportation costs pushed SAT to start domestic sourcing. The third production batch included parts made by such Finnish companies as Keskusvalimo, Suomen Gummitehdas, Pietarsaaren Konepaja and Kone ja Silta. Five vehicles of the fourth production batch were equipped with frames produced by Crichton-Vulcan. The sixth series got Finnish-made radiators produced by Oksanen & Kumpp., hub caps by Lohmann, headlight brackets by Teräskalustaja, rear axle housing by Karhulan Tehtaat, radiator caps by Metalli-Niklaus and electric cables by Suomen Kaapelitehdas. In some cases SAT had to go back to Volvo parts; for example domestically produced track rods turned out to be too weak. Also the first Karhula-produced axle housings did not fulfill the requirements but problems were resolved after. Some of the imported parts were substituted by own component production; fuel tanks as an example.

The weakening of Finnish mark against the Swedish crown made importing increasingly unfavourable, forcing SAT to focus more on local sourcing activities. Designing of the upgraded models S-341 and S-342 had begun already in 1933 but they were introduced in 1934. The content of domestic parts was increased, but they were still powered by Volvo delivered Penta EB engines. Both models were available with single or double rear wheels. An interesting, new variant was KV which means kevyt versio, "light version". It was delivered without bonnet and wings for DIY customers.

Volvo supplied SAT until autumn 1935; the last delivered components were Timken axles and Ross steering boxes. The last S-341 and S-342 models were powered by domestically made Olympia engines, which were later used in the following Sisu SO-series.

The total amount of Sisus with Volvo parts reached almost 200 vehicles of which 70 first units were practically built on Volvo chassis and additional 12 units were largely based on Volvo components.

=== Production figures of the pre-series and first serial units ===
Production batch	Used Volvo chassis			Produced Sisu models			Notes
Production batch	LV-66	LV-71	LV-72	S-321	S-322	S-323	Notes
pre	7	1×E	1×D	1×E lorry	1×D bus	7 lorries	Production started 1931, finished 1932.
I		3×E; 3×D	2×E; 2×D	5 lorries	2 lorries, 2 buses		1 chassis used for parts. Production started 22 February 1933, finished 1933.
II		3×E; 3×D	1×E; 3×D	4×E; 1×D	5×D; 1 lorry, 2 buses and 2 combination buses		One S-322D was afterwards converted S-321E and equipped with combination bus coach. Production started 5 April 1933, finished 1933.
III		5×E; 1×D	4×D	5×E	5×D		Production started and finished 1933.
IV		2×E; 4×D	4×D	6	4		Five S-321's are built on Crichton-Vulcan frame. Production started 20 June 1933, finished 1933.
V		3×E; 3×D	4×D	3	7		Three frames from Crichton-Vulcan. Production started 4 August 1933, finished 1933.
VI		5×E	5×D	5×E	1×E; 4×D		All frames from Crichton-Vulcan. Production started and finished 1933.
VII		5×E	5×D	5×E	5×D		All frames from Crichton-Vulcan. Production started 2 March 1934, finished 1934.

== Technical data ==
=== Engine ===
Those pre-series units which were based on Volvo LV-66 were powered by six-in-line, OHV type Penta DC engines. According to Volvo data the displacement is 4,097 cm³ and output 75 horsepower; SAT had exaggerated these figures to 4,100 cm³ and 84 horsepower on its brochures. The serial produced units based on LV-71 and LV-72 had a six-cylinder side-valve 3,266-cm³ Penta EB that produced 65 horsepower at 3000 1/min. The Penta's were expensive but they had a good reputation.

In 1934 SAT started using domestic Olympia engines produced by Suomen Moottoritehdas in Vaasa. The six-cylinder OHV in-line engine displacement was 3,660 cm³ and the type was developed from a marine engine. Although modern on paper, the engines caused later several technical problems.

=== Cabin ===
The design of the first seven cabins used on the pre-series lorry models originate from the preceding company Autokoritehdas. They were American style with a vertical windscreen and a visor and mounted also on other chassis than Sisu's. The first serial-produced Sisu's got domestic produced radiator which was slightly higher than the one delivered by Volvo. Therefore, the production series bonnet front end is slightly higher compared to that of the pre-series. Also the Volvo-delivered headlights were replaced by Bosch products in the serial production. The S-323D's produced for the Logistics Battalion were equipped with extra large headlights. The army vehicles also had a bracket for spare wheel between the cabin and platform.

Later an own cabin was designed for the production models and these ones were also sold to the Finnish representative of Volvo. Since the beginning all body panels were produced by SAT although the bonnet and front wings were evidently heavily inspired by those of Volvo.

=== Chassis ===
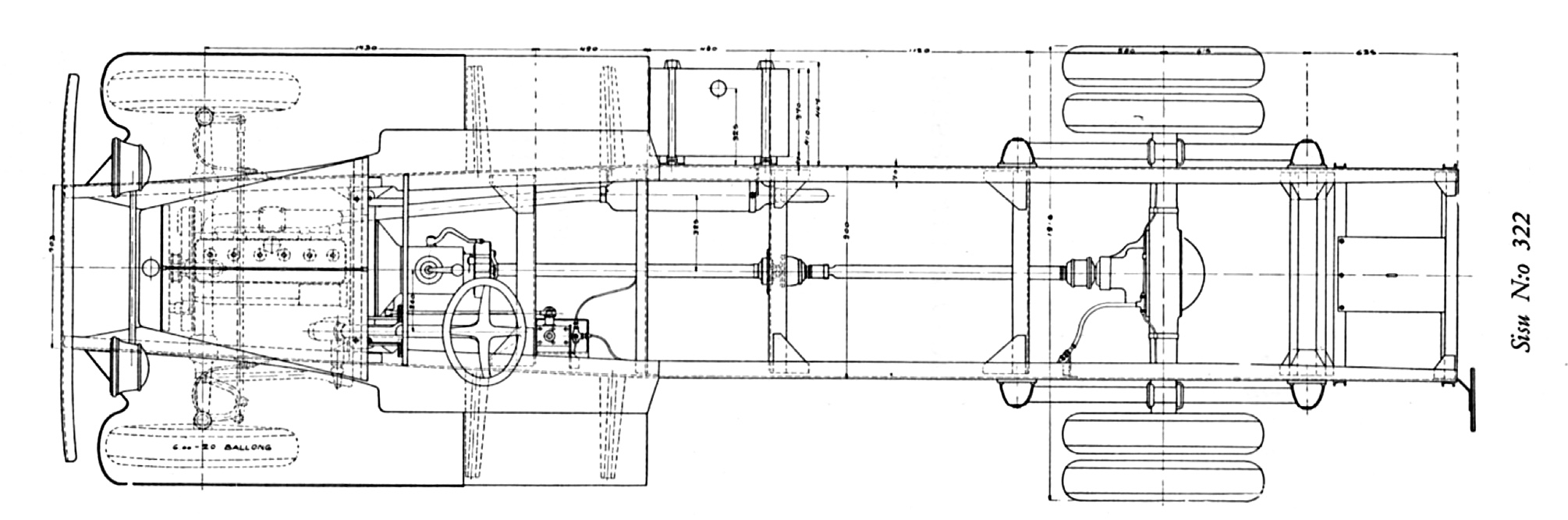
Sisu S-322 Chassis.

At the beginning the frame was produced by Volvo but later they were supplied by Crichton-Vulcan. The wheelbase of S-321 is 3,400 mm, S-322 4,100 mm and S-323 is with 3,800 mm. Also S-324 with wheelbase of 4,600 mm appears on some early brochures, but there is no evidence that a single unit was ever produced. Vehicles of the pre-series had a larger front wheel bearing cap than the serial produced units. The tyres were produced by Englebert.

The braking system was modern since the beginning: Sisu's were equipped with all-wheel hydraulic Lockheed brakes.

The vehicles have worked properly and fulfilled all such requirements which can be expected from a first-class lorry. Hereby we witness this with great pleasure.

— Helsinki, 10 November 1933
O/Y Alkoholiliike A/B,

=== Characteristics ===
The lorries S-321 and S-322 were designated with 2,500 kg capacity and 4,800 kg total weight. The shorter S-321 is with 2,800 mm long platform and S-322 has a platform length of 3,500 mm.

The Sisu's were built more robust than the competitors of the same capacity; as Sisu's could not compete with price, SAT used durability as sales argument. The strategy proved successful as the Finnish roads, mostly rather harsh back then, put vehicles into test.

== Survived units ==
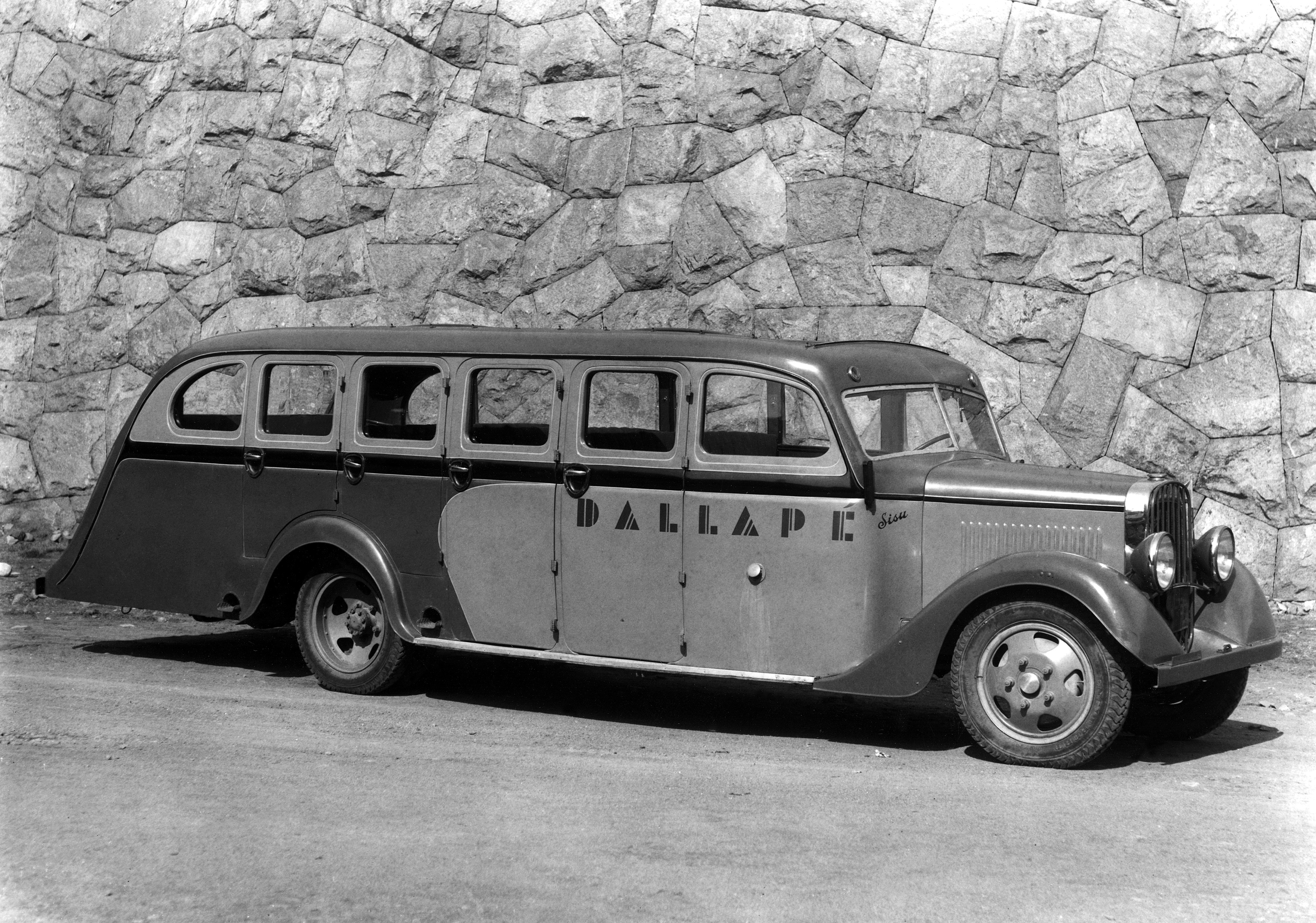
Sisu S-322D used by dance orchestra Dallapé photographed in 1934.

The best-known survived first-generation Sisu is a 1933-produced S-322D with a tourist bus coach. SAT had not got the payment before the operator bankrupted while the bus was in Warsaw. SAT had to arrange the retrieval. The bus turned out to be difficult to sell, as the coach was rather unusual type without aisle and equipped with saloon style side doors. An orchestra called Dallapé bought the bus in 1934 and made it famous by touring by it around Finland. The bus was sold at the end of 1939 and converted into fire engine in the following year. The Finnish vintage vehicle association SA-HK saved it from scrapping in 1970. As the original coach was largely disappeared, the reconstruction work was postponed due to lack of funds, until it was finally done in years 1982–1985. The bus has been displayed in many museums and several vintage vehicle meetings thereafter. A Dallapé text was painted on the sides in the 1990s.

Tampere Technical Museum houses a 1934-produced S-322D lorry which is from the last Volvo-based production series. The first owner was Yhtyneet Paperitehtaat Simpele Paper Mill which sold it in 1939 to Viipuri-based K. Widing Engine Repairs Shop that evacuated the vehicle to Hämeenlinna during the war. Due to damages the lorry suffered during the war its cabin was later modified and has now a split windscreen and higher roof. The lorry played a side role on an Edvin Laine directed film Akseli and Elina filmed in summer 1970.

In summer 2001 a rusted S-342D from 1934 was saved for restoration. Originally it had been used for coal transportation and it served as a tow truck at depot of a bus operator from 1947 until the 1950s.

== Sources ==
- Blomberg, Olli (2006). Suomalaista Sisua vuodesta 1931 – Monialaosaajasta kuorma-autotehtaaksi [Finnish Sisu since 1931 – From multi-industrial expert to lorry factory] (in Finnish). Karis: Oy Sisu Auto Ab. ISBN 952-91-4918-2.
- Mäkipirtti, Markku. Sisu. Ajoneuvot Suomessa (in Finnish). Vol. 4 (2. ed.). Tampere: Apali Oy. ISBN 978-952-5877-05-2.
