= Tor Nessling =

Finnish industrialist, entrepreneur and engineer (1901-1971)

vuorineuvos Tor Ragnar Nessling
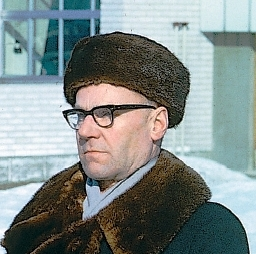
- Nessling at a truck launch in 1962
- Born: 6 September 1901; Helsinki, Finland
- Died: 23 November 1971 (aged 70); Helsinki, Finland
- Education: diplomi-insinööri
- Alma mater: Helsinki University of Technology
- Occupation: General Manager
- Years active: 1931–1970
- Employer: Oy Suomen Autoteollisuus Ab
- Predecessor: John Hellsten
- Successor: Erik Gillberg
- Spouse: Greta Maria ("Maj") née Kock
- Awards: vuorineuvos (1962); Commander of the Order of the Lion of Finland; Cross of Liberty, 3rd Class; Cross of Liberty, 4th Class; Knight of the White Rose of Finland; Medal of Liberty, 2nd Class; Memorial Medal of Winter War

Tor Ragnar Nessling MSc (diplomi-insinööri) (6 September 1901 – 23 November 1971) was a leading Finnish industrialist, entrepreneur and engineer. For nearly four decades he was the general manager of the Finnish heavy vehicle producer Suomen Autoteollisuus (SAT). His contribution to national development was officially recognized by the Finnish President who appointed Nessling as a "Vuorineuvos".

Nessling became head of SAT in 1932, soon after the company's foundation. He developed the business in an era when only few believed in the possibility of a Finnish automotive industry, and a decade later had become the company's majority shareholder. Nessling took a patriarchal approach to his leadership of the company, which he built into a producer of trucks, bus chassis, rail vehicles and specialist terminal tractors. Nessling lost his controlling shareholding following a merger in 1968, resigned in 1970 and died the following year.

== Studies and early career ==
Nessling belonged to the Swedish-speaking population of Finland. His parents were engineer John Nessling and Greta née Grönholm. Nessling did his abitur at the Helsinki coeducational Swedish language grammar school Läroverket för gossar och flickor in 1920. He continued his studies at the Mechanical Engineering Faculty of the Helsinki University of Technology: simultaneously he studied geology at the University of Helsinki between 1922 and 1924. Nessling graduated as a diplomi-insinööri in 1924. He traveled in Sweden, the UK, Germany and the US, and between 1926 and 1928 Nessling worked successively for three Finnish automobile import companies Korpivaara & Halla, Henry-Auto and Auto-Bil. He worked as manager in the auto-business with Munkkisaaren Autotalli ja Konepaja from 1928 to 1929 and then with Autovarikko between 1929 and 1930.

== Formation of Suomen Autoteollisuus ==
In 1929, Nessling was appointed Technical Manager of the bus and coach builder Autoteollisuus-Bilindustri. Nessling wanted to develop a new branch of industry for his country and in the same year he became interested in starting a lorry and bus industry in Finland. Autoteollisuus–Bilindustri put together its activities with another coachbuilder Osakeyhtiö Autokoritehdas in 1931. The name of the new company was Suomen Autoteollisuus (Finnish Auto-industry) and its first general manager was John Hellsten. It is often claimed that Nessling was a founder of SAT: he was not. The operation was organised by Karl Arthur Nordgrén, Emil Anton Winckelmann and Lars Wilhelm Åberg. However, the year after the company's creation Nessling was appointed general manager of the SAT.

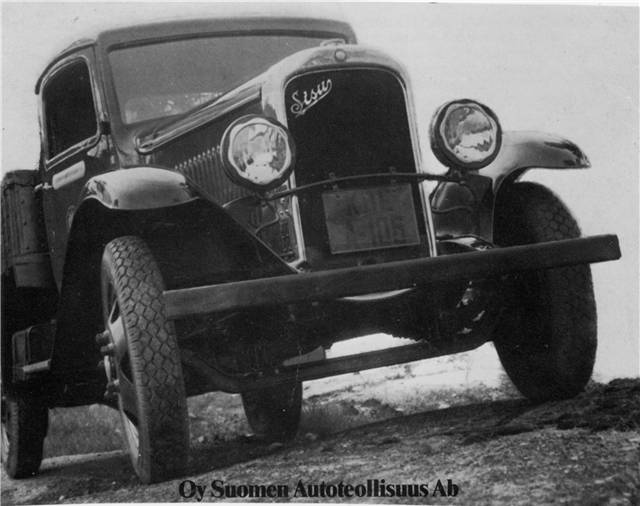
One of the first Sisu's: S-321 from 1932.

Starting a vehicle construction business virtually from scratch in the middle of a recession seemed impossible, but under Nessling's determined leadership that is what was achieved. The vehicle brand selected was Sisu, and the first 12 Sisu vehicles rolled out from the factory in 1932. Although the level of domestic content was just 20% at the beginning Nessling was determined to increase this substantially. Famously, he liked to say, "A Finn is capable of making anything which a foreigner can make." By the end of the 1930s, Sisu vehicles contained 40% local content. Nessling strongly lobbied the Finnish government about the growth potential of automotive industry, stressing the employment potential and also the strategic significance of Finnish controlled vehicle production for national defence. However, the government ignored his arguments and progressively cut the import tariffs on heavy vehicles during the 1930s, making competition for the domestic industry more intense. In addition, some of the owners of SAT began to doubt the prospects for domestic heavy vehicle production. Nessling offered to buy from Helsingin Osakepankki its shares in SAT in 1938. He obtained the shares cheaply, but to finance the bargain he nevertheless had to pledge his wife's entire property. Eventually, Nessling ended up owning 80% of SAT.

== Second World War and Yhteissisu ==
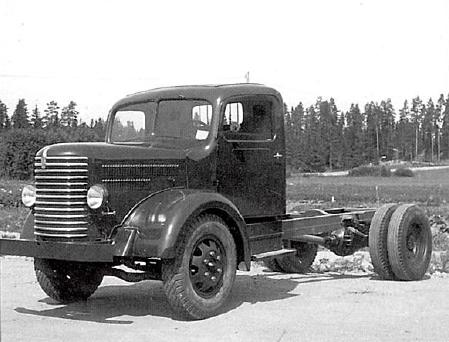
Sisu S-22 made by Yhteissisu (ca 1947)

The Second World War brought new challenges to SAT because many foreign components became unobtainable. The degree of domestic content could be increased to 90%, though only with much effort. A big step forward came with the start of American Hercules engine production under licence. Principle customers for SAT during the war were the Finnish Defence Forces and other government institutions. SAT started building a new factory in Karis, where it would be less vulnerable to Soviet air raids than Helsinki. The production capacity was not adequate to meet the demand; in 1942, the Defence Forces estimated that they would need 7,000 lorries and buses in the next few years. Nessling suggested building the Karis factory larger than had originally been planned. However, SAT's economic and technical resources were limited, and influential heavy vehicle importers, supported by some political factions, suspected that SAT was exploiting the war to benefit unfairly and gain a dominant position in the Finnish market. The government suggested an arrangement in which SAT would have become partly state owned. Nessling ruled this option out, however, he did not want the state to be involved in SAT. The fall-back option was creation of another company with support of the state and some significant Finnish companies. Such a company, Yhteissisu, was formed in 1943 and Tor Nessling, most reluctantly, found himself installed its general manager. Yhteissisu started building Sisu lorries in Vanaja, some 100 km (63 miles) to the north of Helsinki. But war gave way to peace before Yhteissisu's capability to build military trucks had come fully on stream. Nessling left his post with Yhteissisu in 1946, complaining of lack of support from the company owners. Yhteissisu lorry production was redirected to the civilian market, and in 1948 the company was renamed "Vanajan Autotehdas" (VAT).

By now, Nessling was becoming increasingly embittered with the Finnish government. First his ideas about domestic heavy vehicle production were ignored in the 1930s, and then the government had forced through the creation of a powerful competitor which had established itself by using technology developed by Nessling's company. Disenchantment with the politicians was in evidence when the government offered Nessling beneficial funding opportunities in the 1960s: he replied that he had never requested, and would never ask for anything from the government.

== Post-war growth of SAT ==
Production of SAT grew strongly in the 1950s and 1960s; the volumes quadrupled to 800 vehicles per year during the 1950s. In addition to producing lorries and bus chassis, the company provided trams and rail vehicles to the Finnish State Railways. SAT products were exported to four continents. The growing volumes both required and benefited from investment in production facilities and sales and marketing campaigns. Unlike many contemporary industrialists, Nessling valued marketing, and he focused closely on identifying, understanding and satisfying customer needs.

== Merger with VAT and resignation ==
SAT's leading domestic competitor, Vanajan Autotehdas, was in financial trouble by end of the 1960s. Nessling proposed a merger between Vanajan Autotehdas and SAT because he was afraid that a foreign competitor, such as Volvo or Scania, would otherwise take over Vanajan Autotehdas. The companies came together in 1968. In the end, the merger led to a situation that Nessling had wanted to avoid: the state became a part-owner of the new SAT with a 17% shareholding and Nessling lost his controlling majority as his own holding fell to below 50%. SAT acquired an executive board of directors and a supervisory board. Although Nessling was still the company's principal shareholder, his influence was diminished: he had very little recent experience of receiving orders or of operating with a board of directors, and he found adapting to the new situation difficult.

Relations between Nessling and the board got worse when Nessling fell ill. He recovered, but not sufficiently to be able to work as before, although he was keen to continue with his role in the company management. The board was not convinced and reorganised the company structure. Nessling resisted the transfer of marketing responsibilities to other hands but could not prevent it. Nessling's old business partner and friend, then head of British Leyland Motor Corporation, Lord Stokes, whom Nessling greatly respected, eventually persuaded him to step aside. Tor Nessling announced his resignation as general manager of Suomen Autoteollisuus in June 1970, after leading the company for nearly four decades. Erik Gillberg was appointed the new general manager in February 1971.

== Personal life and death ==
Nessling worked hard and shunned the limelight. He worked closely with a small number of trusted colleagues, but many colleagues and underlings remembered his leadership style as patriarchal and distant. He resisted delegating decisions. He is described as a brilliant businessman who had the ability to spot business opportunities, but he was also a quick tempered, and was found by some to be excessively risk-averse. The tough industrialist also had his softer side: he liked nature and animals, and he kept many pets at his home.

Nessling had married Greta Maria "Maj" (née Kock) in 1926 who stayed home as a housewife while supporting her husband in his career. The marriage was childless, and when Nessling died in 1971 his widow sold the family share in SAT. In 1972 she bequeathed their property to establish the Maj and Tor Nessling Foundation. The foundation is a significant funder of environmental research in Finland.
