= Volvo Longnose =

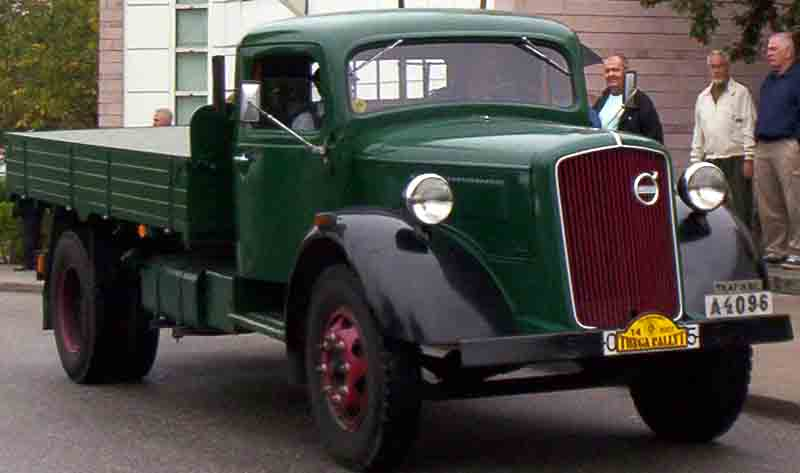

Overview
- Manufacturer: Volvo
- Also called: Volvo LV180–193; Volvo LV290–293
- Production: 1937–1951, approx. 3,280 produced

Body and chassis
- Class: Medium/heavy duty truck

Powertrain
- Engine: Volvo ohv inline 6
- Transmission: 4 speed non-syncro manual

Dimensions
- Wheelbase: 3.4 m (133.9 in) – 4.7 m (185.0 in)
- Curb weight: 7,500 kg (16,534.7 lb) – 16,000 kg (35,274.0 lb) (gross weight)

Chronology
- Predecessor: Volvo LV66-series
- Successor: Volvo Viking

The Volvo LV180/190 and 290-series, or the Longnose was a truck produced by Swedish automaker Volvo between 1937 and 1951.

== Volvo LV180/190 ==
The LV180/190-series was presented in the beginning of 1937. The truck shared both front end and engine with the smaller LV90-series while other components were sturdier to cope with heavier loads.

Production ceased in 1943 and the LV180/190-series was replaced by larger versions of the Roundnose.

== Volvo LV290 ==
The "Longnose" LV290 was Volvo's largest truck so far. With trailing axle the gross weight could reach 13 tonnes. It had a new overhead valve engine, designed by Gotthard Österberg who had come to Volvo when Tidaholm ceased production in 1933. To cover the engine the LV290 had an even longer bonnet than the LV180/190 trucks. During the Second World War many of these trucks had their engines converted to run on wood gas.

From 1947 onwards the LV290 series could be delivered with Volvo's pre-chamber diesel engine VDB. On these trucks the bonnet had been extended even further to accommodate the large engine. A few trucks were fitted with the larger direct injected VDF engine in 1951 before the Longnose was succeeded by Volvo Titan.

== Engines ==
Model	Year	Engine	Displacement	Power	Type
LV180-193	1937–43	Volvo FC: I6 ohv	4,394 cc (268.1 cu in)	90 bhp (67 kW)	Petrol engine
LV180-193	1937–43	Volvo FCH: I6 ohv	4,394 cc (268.1 cu in)	90 bhp (67 kW)	Hesselman engine
LV290-293	1937	Volvo FA: I6 ohv	6,724 cc (410.3 cu in)	120 bhp (89 kW)	Petrol engine
LV290-293	1937	Volvo FAH: I6 ohv	6,724 cc (410.3 cu in)	120 bhp (89 kW)	Hesselman engine
LV290-293	1938–51	Volvo FB: I6 ohv	7,565 cc (461.6 cu in)	140 bhp (104 kW)	Petrol engine
LV290-293	1938–46	Volvo FBH: I6 ohv	7,565 cc (461.6 cu in)	140 bhp (104 kW)	Hesselman engine
LV290-293	1947–51	Volvo VDB: I6 ohv	8,740 cc (533 cu in)	130 bhp (97 kW)	Pre-chamber diesel
LV290-293	1951	Volvo VDF: I6 ohv	9,602 cc (585.9 cu in)	150 bhp (112 kW)	Direct injection diesel

== Gallery ==
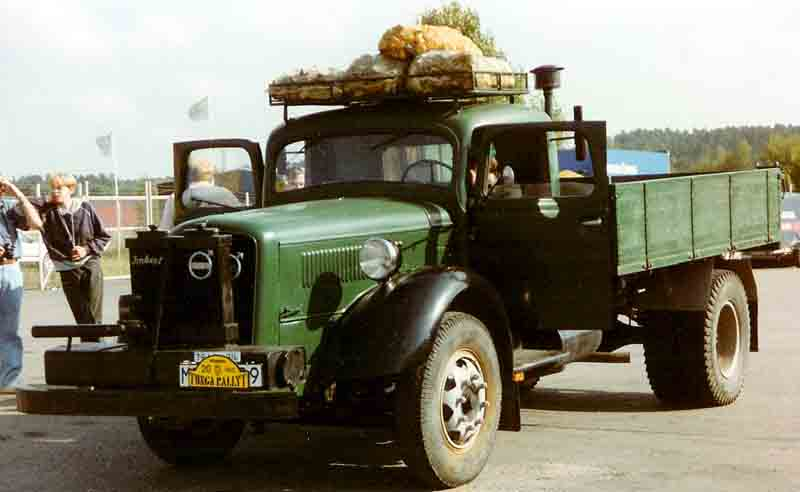
1942 Volvo LV292 with wood gas generator.

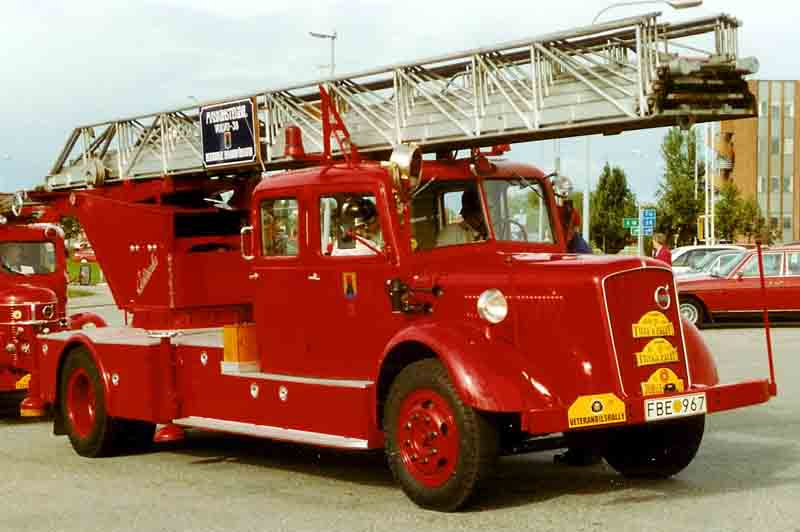
1938 Volvo LV293 fire engine.
