= Volvo F88 =

Volvo F88/F89
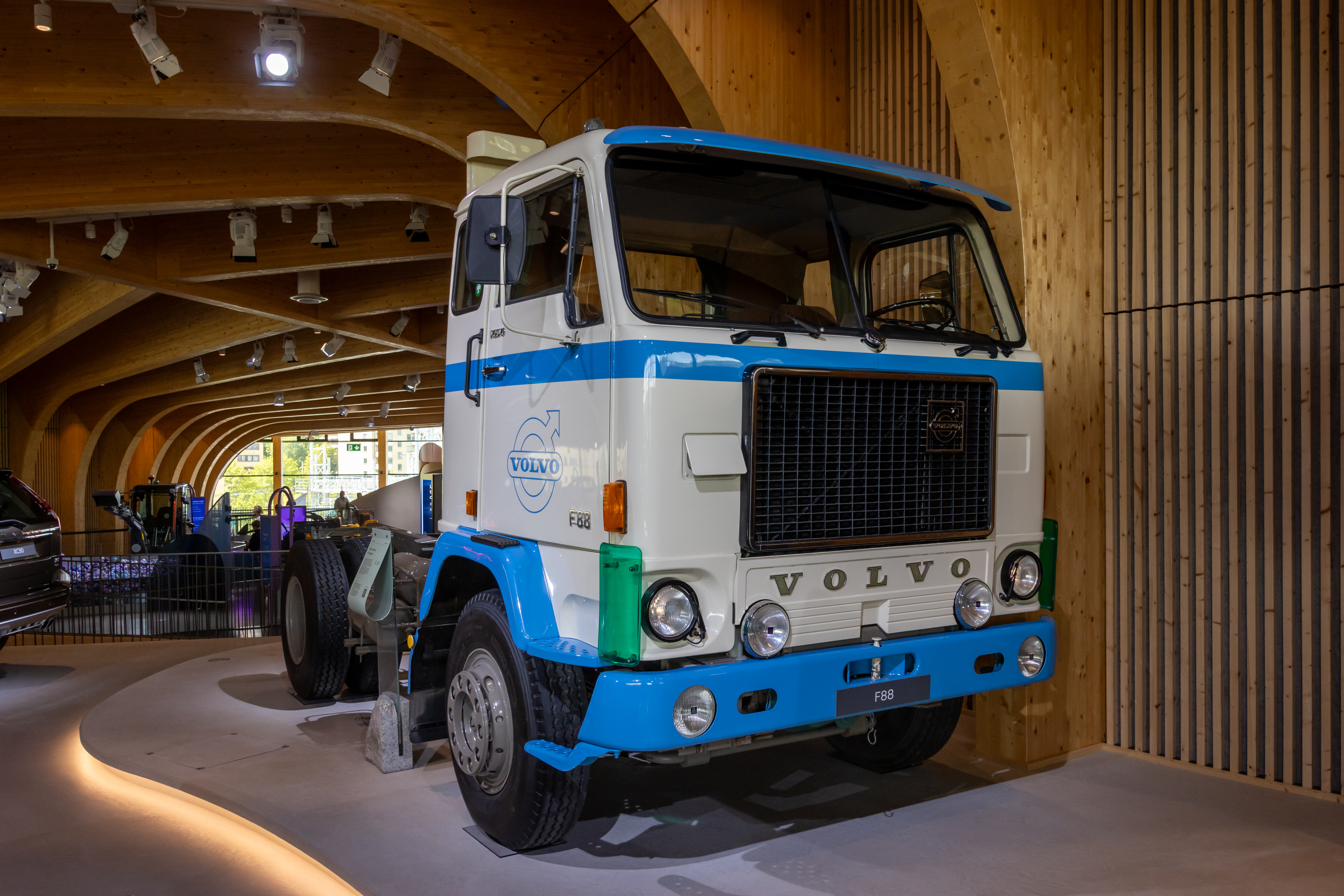

Overview
- Manufacturer: Volvo Trucks
- Production: 1965–1977 approx. 61,200 produced

Body and chassis
- Class: Heavy-duty truck

Powertrain
- Engine: Volvo D100/TD100/TD120 naturally aspirated/turbocharged ohv I6 diesel engine
- Transmission: 8-speed R61 and 16-speed SR61 manual gearbox

Dimensions
- Curb weight: 17,000 kg (37,478.6 lb) – 26,500 kg (58,422.5 lb) (gross weight)

Chronology
- Predecessor: Volvo Titan
- Successor: Volvo F10/F12

The Volvo F88/F89 was a series of heavy-duty trucks produced by Swedish automaker Volvo between 1965 and 1977.

Volvo presented the forward control F88 in 1965. The truck was the first part of the company's export-oriented "System 8", which served as basis for the truck giant Volvo is today. The F88 sold well internationally and began a reputation for durable cab-over trucks.

== Volvo F88 ==
The F88 cab had already been introduced on the predecessor Titan Tiptop in 1964, but the rest of the truck was redesigned. This included a new engine, a new eight-speed gear box and stronger chassis and suspension.

A derivative was the G88 introduced in 1970, which was basically the same vehicle but with the front axle fitted 300 mm (11.8 in) further forward to allow greater axle spread. This was necessary to increase the GCWR up to 52.5 tonnes (51.7 long tons).

The engine is a 9.6-liter TD100 turbocharged inline-6 diesel engine with the specification of:

260 horsepower at 2,200 rpm and 940 newton-meters at 1,300 rpm (rpms based on the TD120 engine, can also be applied to the TD100 engine)

== Volvo F89 ==
In 1971 the larger 'F89' was introduced, with the new twelve litre engine, which development started in 1969. The truck and the engine were designed to meet a West German regulation that put a lower limit for the number of horsepower per GCWR. To continue selling trucks in the heaviest class, Volvo developed a new, more powerful engine and the F89 was the first Volvo truck to be sold with turbo engines only. The TD120 engine was so tall that it must be mounted inclined in the frame to fit under the cab. This made it impossible to convert the truck for right-hand drive. Countries with left-hand traffic had to make do with a stronger version of the F88 with its engine power boosted to 312 hp (233 kW).

The engine is a 12-liter TD120 turbocharged inline-6 diesel engine with the specification of:

330 horsepower at 2,200 rpm and 1,257 newton-meters at 1,300 rpm

== Engines ==
Model	Year	Engine	Displacement	Power	Type
F88	1965–77	Volvo D100: I6 ohv	9,602 cc (585.9 cu in)	200 bhp (149 kW)	Diesel engine
F88	1965–77	Volvo TD100: I6 ohv	9,602 cc (585.9 cu in)	260–312 hk (191–229 kW)	Turbodiesel
F89	1970–77	Volvo TD120: I6 ohv	11,979 cc (731.0 cu in)	330 bhp (246 kW)	Turbodiesel

== Gallery ==
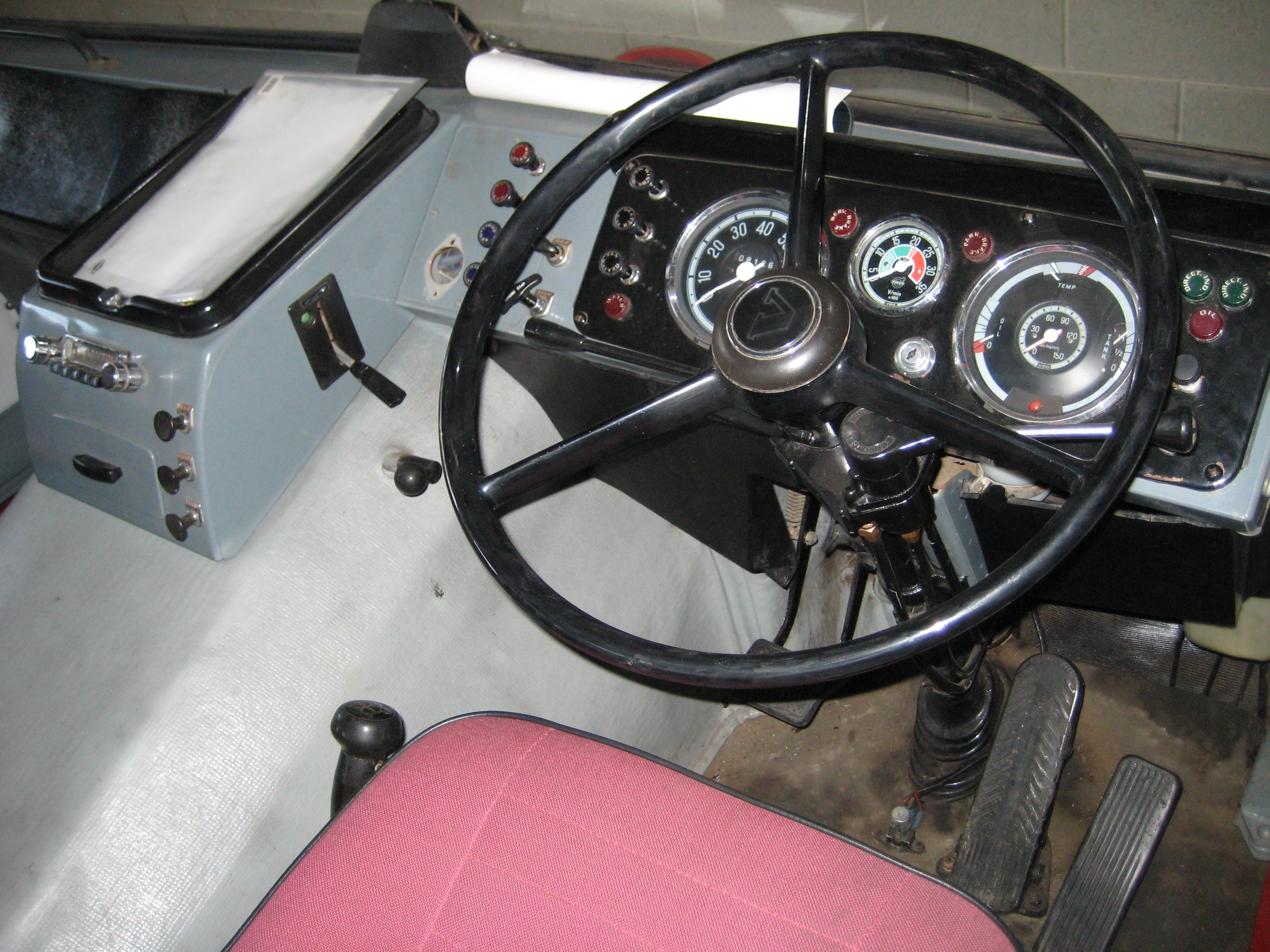
Volvo G88 dashboard.

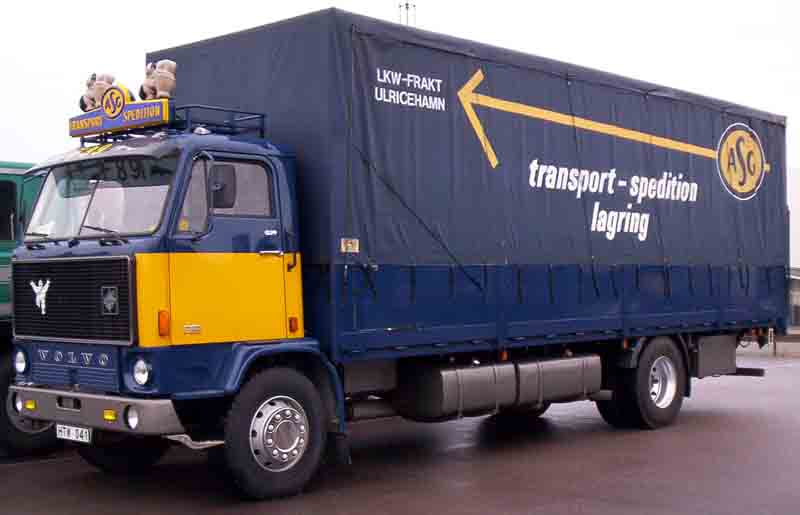
1974 Volvo F89
