= Volvo F85 =

Volvo F84/F85/F86
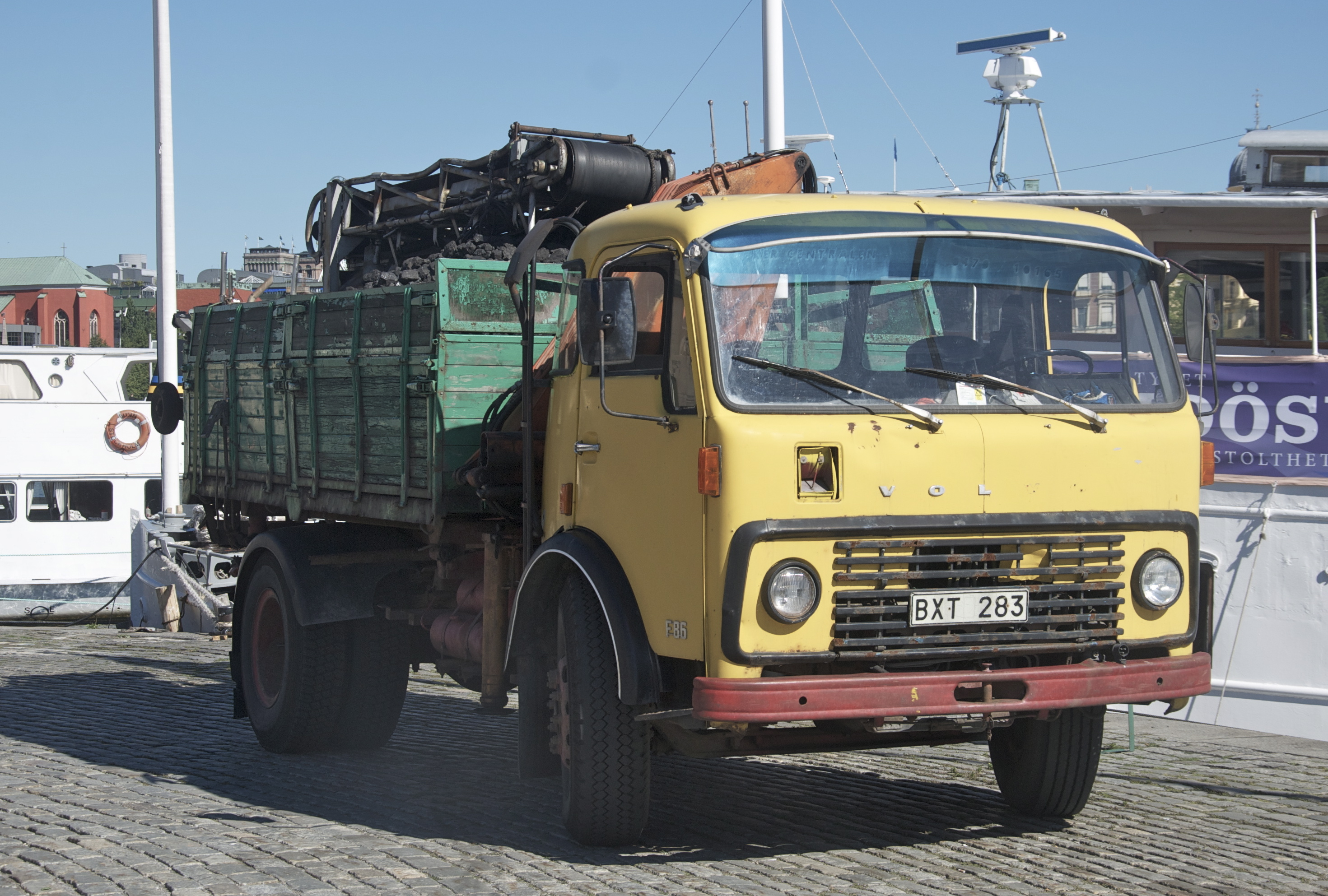

Overview
- Manufacturer: Volvo
- Production: 1965–1979, approx. 58,800 produced

Body and chassis
- Class: Medium size truck

Powertrain
- Engine: Volvo ohv I6 diesel engine

Dimensions
- Curb weight: 12,500 kg (27,557.8 lb) – 25,000 kg (55,115.6 lb) (gross weight)

Chronology
- Predecessor: Volvo Brage; Volvo Viking
- Successor: Volvo F6

The Volvo F84/F85/F86 was a series of medium size trucks produced by Swedish automaker Volvo between 1965 and 1979.

== Volvo F84/F85 ==
Volvo presented the forward control Raske Tiptop with a tilting cab in 1962. When Volvo introduced its "System 8" in 1965 the truck got a new, bigger engine and was renamed F85. Between 1968 and 1974 Volvo offered a budget version called F84 without power steering and with reduced payload.

In 1976 Volvo upgraded the truck and renamed it F85S. The S-version had a bigger engine and a more comfortable cab.

== Volvo F86 ==
In 1964 Volvo had mounted the forward control cab from Raske Tiptop on its Viking model. When Volvo introduced its "System 8" the following year, the truck was renamed F86. The changes, however, were more extensive than that and included a new engine, a new eight-speed gear box and a general updating of most of the components. The F86 was also assembled in Scotland, for sales in the British Isles.

Modernization of the truck in 1973 included a new plastic radiator grille. In 1976 the driver's work place was improved with a more comfortable cab.

== Engines ==
Model	Year	Engine	Displacement	Power	Type
F84/F85	1965–76	Volvo D50: I6 ohv	5,130 cc (313 cu in)	117 hp (86 kW)	Diesel engine
F84/F85	1965–76	Volvo TD50: I6 ohv	5,130 cc (313 cu in)	165 hp (121 kW)	Turbo-diesel
F86	1965–79	Volvo D70: I6 ohv	6,724 cc (410.3 cu in)	150 hp (110 kW)	Diesel engine
F86	1965–79	Volvo TD70: I6 ohv	6,724 cc (410.3 cu in)	210 hp (154 kW)	Turbo-diesel
F85S	1977–78	Volvo TD60: I6 ohv	5,479 cc (334.3 cu in)	180 hp (132 kW)	Turbo-diesel
