= N84 =

N84 may refer to:

- Escadrille N.84, a unit of the French Air Force
- HMS Odin (N84), a submarine of the Royal Navy
- N84 road (Ireland)
- Nebraska Highway 84, in the United States
- Volvo N84, a Swedish truck
