= N88 =

N88 may refer to:

- N88 (Long Island bus)
- Escadrille N.88, a unit of the French Air Force
- HMS Regulus (N88), a submarine of the Royal Navy
- Nebraska Highway 88, in the United States
- Volvo N88, a Swedish truck
