= Volvo Brage =

Volvo Brage/Starke/Raske
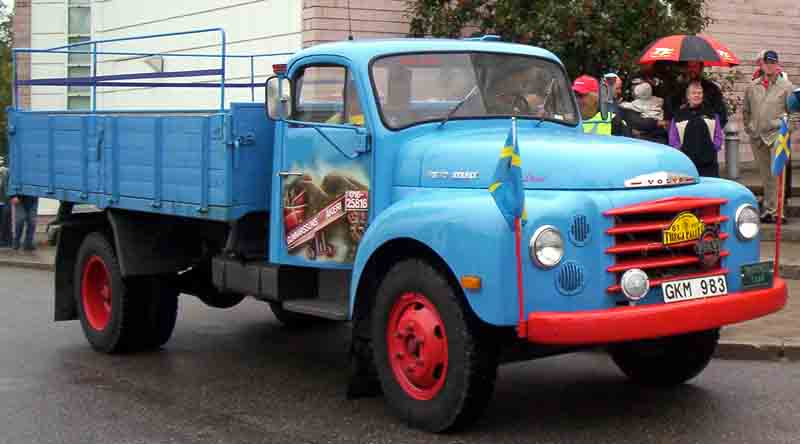

Overview
- Manufacturer: Volvo
- Also called: Volvo L360–375; Volvo L465–475
- Production: 1954–1972 approx. 29,500 produced
- Designer: Jan Wilsgaard

Body and chassis
- Class: Medium size truck

Powertrain
- Engine: Volvo inline 6
- Transmission: 4/5-speed manual

Dimensions
- Curb weight: 8,350 kg (18,408.6 lb) – 11,500 kg (25,353.2 lb) (gross weight)

Chronology
- Predecessor: Volvo Roundnose
- Successor: Volvo F85

The Volvo Brage/Starke/Raske was a series of medium size trucks produced by Swedish automaker Volvo between 1954 and 1972.

== Volvo Brage ==
In 1954 Volvo introduced the medium-sized truck L370 Brage, named after the Norse god Bragi. The truck had a payload of 4.5 tonnes. Brage had an overhead valve petrol engine. In 1955 a budget model called L360 was added. It had a reduced payload of 3.5 tonnes and a side-valve engine. The L360, which was never called Brage, was discontinued in 1957. Early trucks had a non-synchronized four-speed gear box, but this was soon replaced by a synchronized five-speed transmission. Demand for trucks with petrol engines declined with rising fuel prices and the Brage model was discontinued in 1963.

== Volvo Starke ==
Parallel with the Brage model Volvo offered a diesel version called L375 Starke ("Strong"), with a payload of 4.5 tonnes. In 1955 the budget model L365 was added, with a payload of 3.5 tonnes but it was discontinued the following year. Also Starke soon got its unsynchronized gear box replaced with a more modern five-speed gear box.

In 1961 the truck's name was changed to L465 Starke.

== Volvo Raske ==
In 1961 the sturdier L475 Raske ("Swift") was introduced, with a payload of 5 tonnes. Besides Starke's diesel engine Raske was offered with a turbo-diesel.

In 1962 Volvo added the forward control L4751 Raske Tiptop with a tilting cab to the program.

== Volvo N84 ==
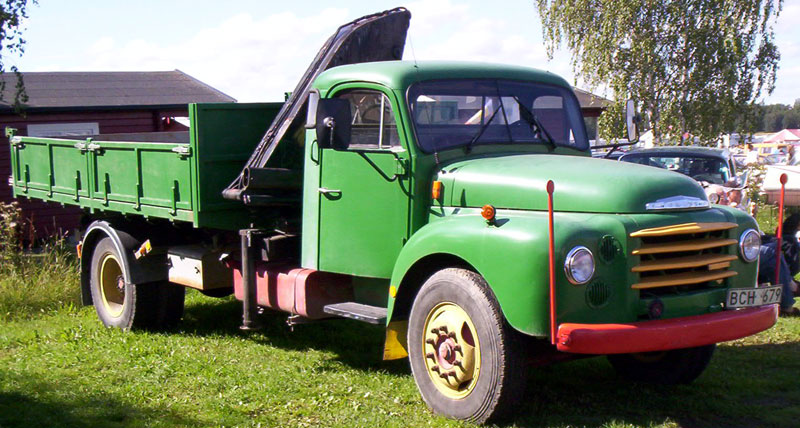
1969 Volvo N84

Volvo introduced its "System 8" in 1965. The Starke model carried on with the new name N84. The major change for the truck was a more powerful engine.

== Other ==
In Norway, this series of trucks were nicknamed "Bamse"(a diminutive for "bear", also meaning "teddy bear")The original names are mostly unknown. The bigger "Viking" retained its original name.

== Engines ==
| Model | Year | Engine | Displacement | Power | Type |
|---|---|---|---|---|---|
| L360 | 1955–57 | Volvo ED: I6 sv | 3,670 cc (224 cu in) | 90 bhp (67 kW) | Petrol engine |
| L370 | 1954–63 | Volvo A6: I6 ohv | 4,703 cc (287.0 cu in) | 115 bhp (86 kW) | Petrol engine |
| L365-475 | 1955–65 | Volvo D47: I6 ohv | 4,703 cc (287.0 cu in) | 95 bhp (71 kW) | Diesel engine |
| L475 | 1961–65 | Volvo TD47: I6 ohv | 4,703 cc (287.0 cu in) | 120 bhp (89 kW) | Turbo-diesel |
| N84 | 1965–72 | Volvo D50: I6 ohv | 5,130 cc (313 cu in) | 107 bhp (80 kW) | Diesel engine |
