= Volvo Roundnose =

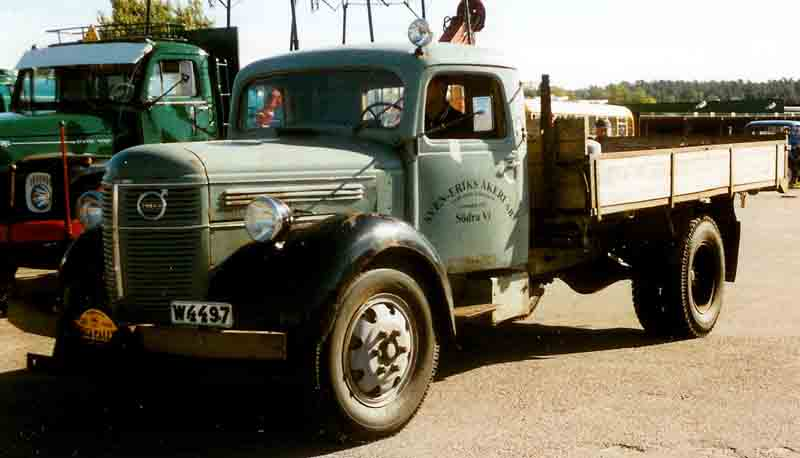

Overview
- Manufacturer: Volvo
- Also called: Volvo LV120 – 154; Volvo L221 – 249
- Production: 1939–1954, approx. 43,500 produced

Body and chassis
- Class: Medium size truck

Powertrain
- Engine: Volvo inline 6
- Transmission: 4-speed non-syncro manual

Dimensions
- Wheelbase: 3.4 m (133.9 in) – 5.3 m (208.7 in)
- Curb weight: 6,400 kg (14,109.6 lb) – 12,300 kg (27,116.9 lb) (gross weight)

Chronology
- Predecessor: Volvo LV81-series
- Successor: Volvo Brage; Volvo Viking

The Volvo LV120/130/140/150-series, or the Roundnose was a medium-size truck produced by Swedish automaker Volvo between 1939 and 1954.

== History ==
The "Roundnose" was introduced in the autumn of 1939, in conjunction with the outbreak of the Second World War. The truck was originally built in three versions. The smallest LV120-series had the same side-valve engine as the Sharpnose. The larger LV125-series and the sturdier LV130-series had the same overhead valve engine as its predecessor LV90. During the war, many of these trucks were equipped with wood gas generators. 1944 saw the introduction of the LV140-series with the big FE engine which replaced the LV180/190-series.

In 1946 the Roundnose became the first Volvo truck offered with a diesel engine. The LV150-series was equipped with Volvo's VDA pre-chamber diesel engine.

All versions were updated in the early 1950s. The LV120-series became the L220-series with a stronger ED engine. The LV140-series became the L230-series, with an improved A6 engine and the LV150-series became the L245-series with a direct injected VDC diesel engine.

== Engines ==
Model	Year	Engine	Displacement	Power	Type
LV120-123	1940–49	Volvo EC: I6 sv	3,670 cc (224 cu in)	86 bhp (64 kW)	Petrol engine
LV125-138	1939–50	Volvo FC: I6 ohv	4,394 cc (268.1 cu in)	90 bhp (67 kW)	Petrol engine
LV125-138	1939–45	Volvo FCH: I6 ohv	4,394 cc (268.1 cu in)	90 bhp (67 kW)	Hesselman engine
LV140-148	1944–51	Volvo FE: I6 ohv	5,652 cc (344.9 cu in)	105 bhp (78 kW)	Petrol engine
LV151-154	1946–49	Volvo VDA: I6 ohv	6,126 cc (373.8 cu in)	95 bhp (71 kW)	Pre-chamber diesel
L221-224	1950–54	Volvo ED: I6 sv	3,670 cc (224 cu in)	90 bhp (67 kW)	Petrol engine
L231-234	1951–54	Volvo A6: I6 ohv	4,703 cc (287.0 cu in)	105 bhp (78 kW)	Petrol engine
L246-249	1950–53	Volvo VDC: I6 ohv	6,126 cc (373.8 cu in)	100 bhp (75 kW)	Direct injection diesel

== Gallery ==
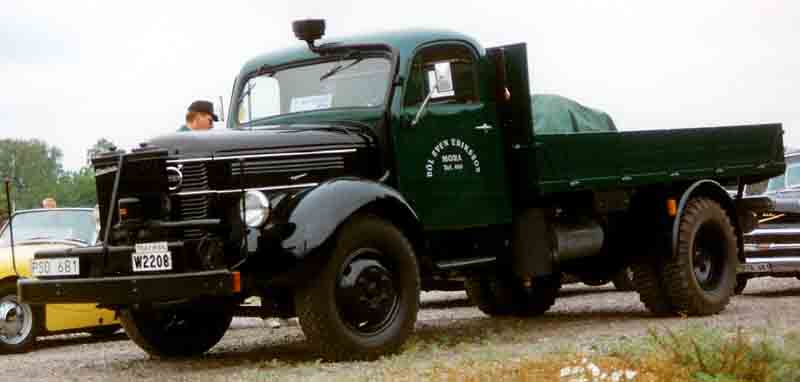
1946 Volvo LV142 with wood gas generator.

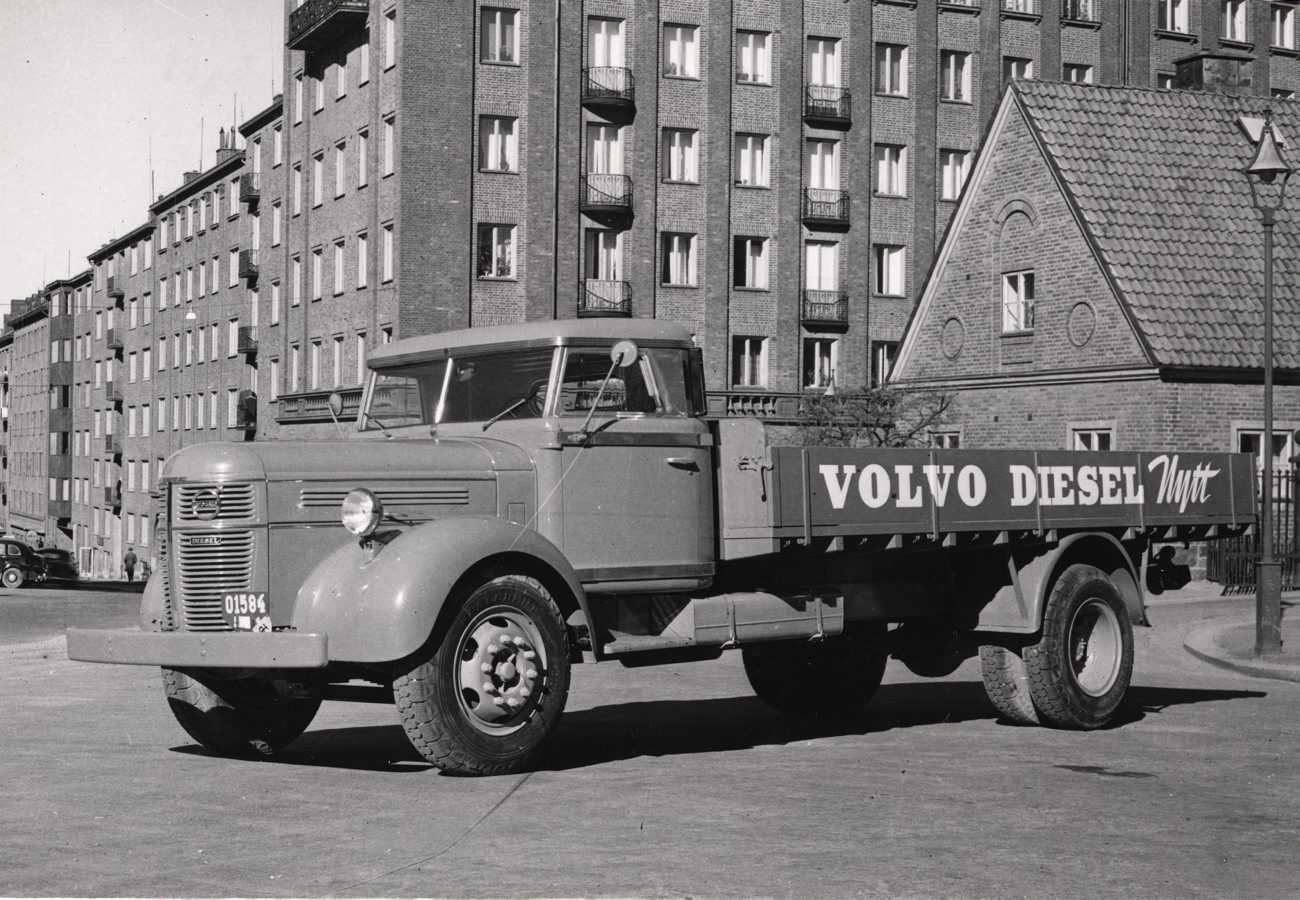
Circa 1950 Volvo L245

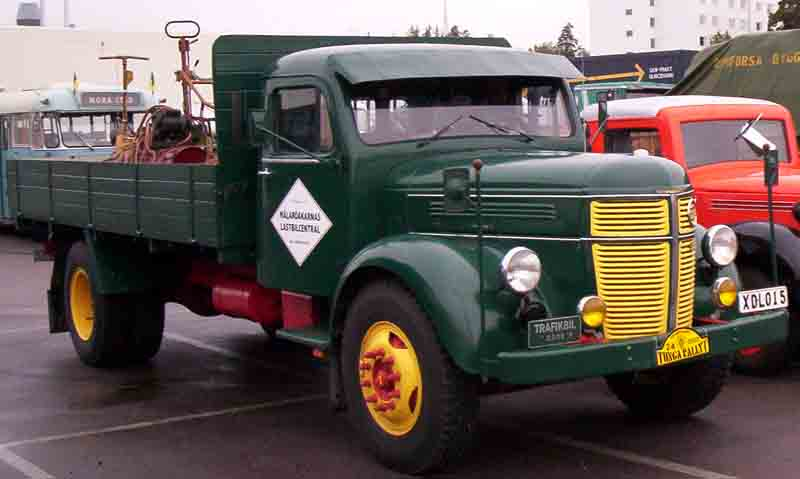
1953 Volvo L249.
