= Volvo Viking =

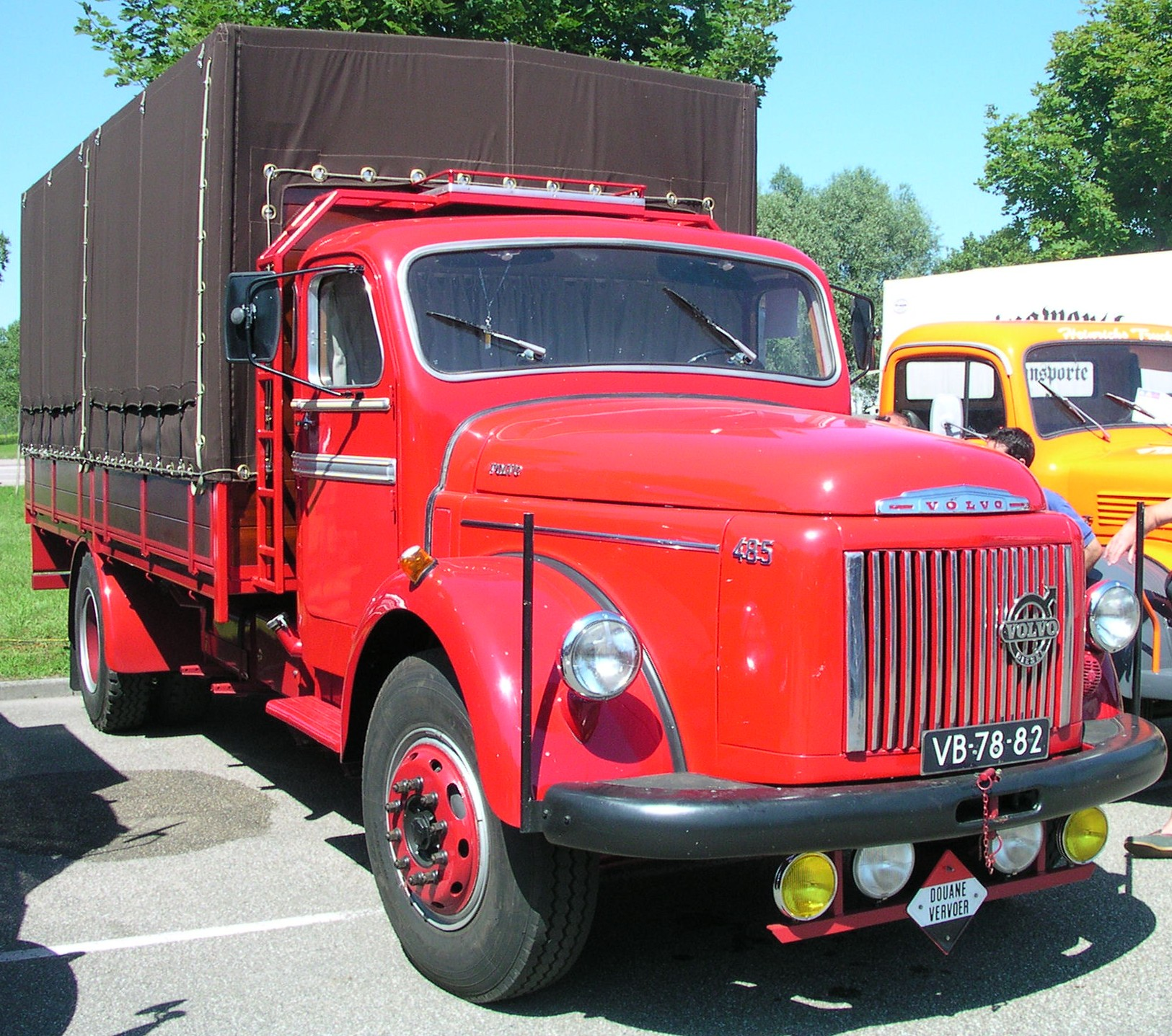

Overview
- Manufacturer: Volvo
- Also called: Volvo L385–485
- Production: 1953–1973, approx. 93,000 produced

Body and chassis
- Class: Medium/heavy duty truck

Powertrain
- Engine: Volvo ohv I6 diesel engine

Dimensions
- Curb weight: 10,000 kg (22,046.2 lb) – 22,000 kg (48,501.7 lb) (gross weight)

Chronology
- Predecessor: Volvo L245
- Successor: Volvo F85

The Volvo Viking was a truck produced by Swedish automaker Volvo between 1953 and 1973.

== Volvo Viking ==
Volvo introduced the L385 Viking in 1953. The truck had a payload capacity of up to 8 tonnes for the heaviest trailing axle versions. The Viking truck was very similar to the larger Titan model. For the first model years the Viking used the VDC motor from its predecessor L245, but it was soon replaced by the updated D67 engine.

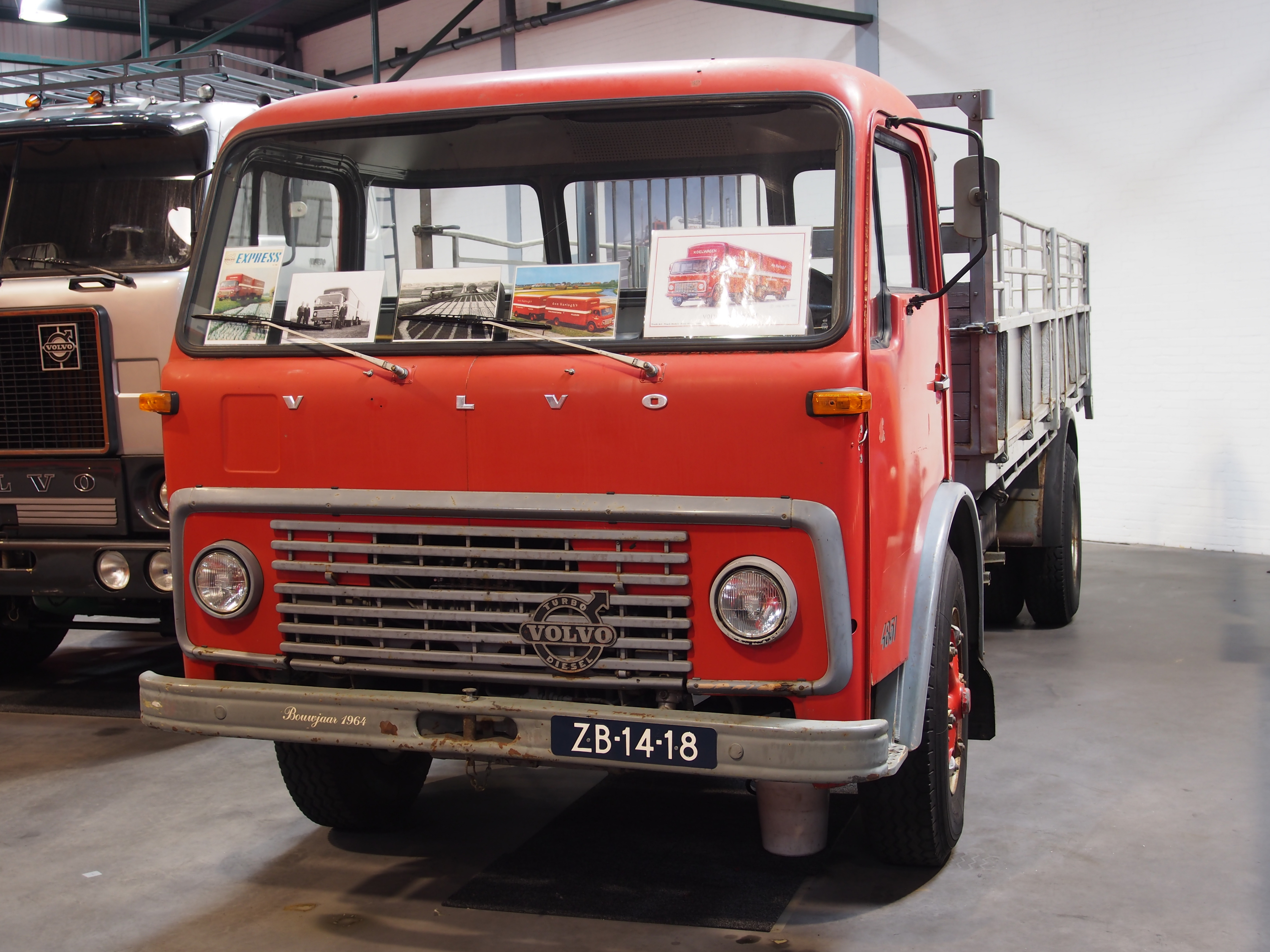
1964 Volvo Viking Tiptop (4851), predecessor to the F86.

1959 saw the introduction of the refined L485 Viking, including a stronger chassis. From 1961, the truck was available with a turbodiesel. In 1964 Volvo introduced the forward control L4851 Viking Tiptop with a tilting cab. This model only lasted a short time, being replaced by the F86 in the summer of 1965, similar in appearance but nearly all-new underneath the skin.

== Volvo N86 ==
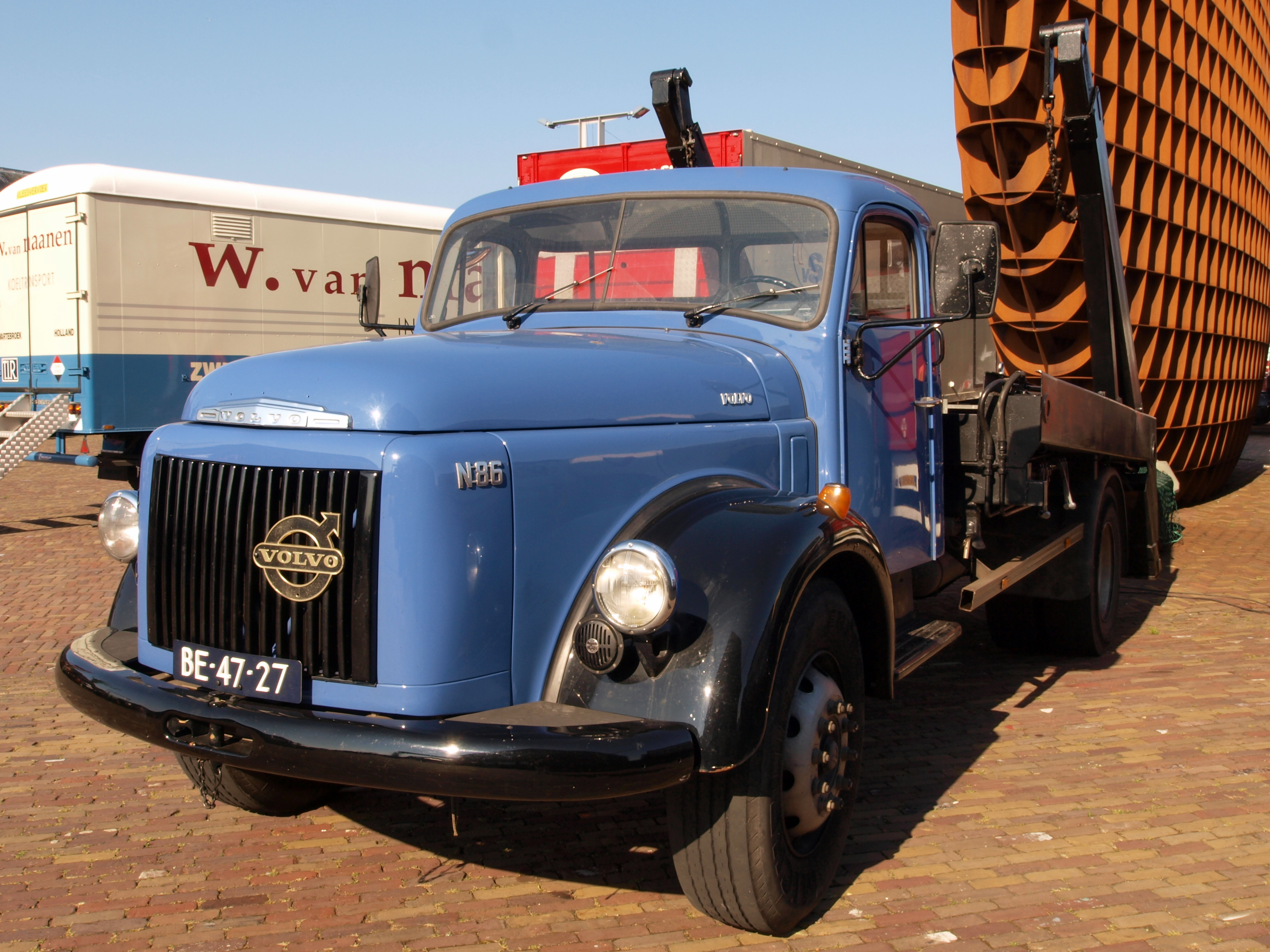
1968 Volvo N86

When Volvo introduced its "System 8" in 1965 the truck's name was changed to N86. Beneath the Viking cab Volvo conducted extensive changes including a new engine, a fully synchronized eight-speed gear box and a general updating of most components.

== Engines ==
Model	Year	Engine	Displacement	Power	Type
L385	1953–54	Volvo VDC: I6 ohv	6,126 cc (373.8 cu in)	100 hp (74 kW)	Diesel engine
L385-485	1955–65	Volvo D67: I6 ohv	6,724 cc (410.3 cu in)	125 hp (92 kW)	Diesel engine
L485	1961–65	Volvo TD67: I6 ohv	6,724 cc (410.3 cu in)	150 hp (110 kW)	Turbodiesel
N86	1965–73	Volvo D70: I6 ohv	6,724 cc (410.3 cu in)	150 hp (110 kW)	Diesel engine
N86	1965–73	Volvo TD70: I6 ohv	6,724 cc (410.3 cu in)	210 hp (154 kW)	Turbodiesel
