= Erik Gillberg =

Finnish engineer and businessman (1926–1999)

vuorineuvos Erik Paul Oskar Gillberg
- Born: 9 October 1926; Hämeenlinna, Finland
- Died: 21 February 1999 (aged 72); Espoo, Finland
- Citizenship: Finland
- Education: diplomi-insinööri
- Occupation: General Manager
- Employers: Kesko Oy 1950–1952; Oy Transporter Ab 1952–1959; Konetuote Oy 1960–1961; Sesamia Oy 1961–1964; Oy Fiskars Ab 1964–1971; Oy Suomen Autoteollisuus Ab (1981→ Oy Sisu-Auto Ab) 1971–1983
- Predecessor: SAT: Tor Nessling
- Successor: SAT: Jorma S. Jerkku
- Spouse: Aila Annikki née Viljanen (born 1929)
- Children: three daughters and one son; born between 1951–1962
- Parent(s): Oskar Rafael Gillberg and Hedwig née Heller
- Awards: vuorineuvos 1982; First Class Knight of the White Rose of Finland; Officer of the Most Excellent Order of the British Empire

Erik Paul Oskar Gillberg MSc (diplomi-insinööri) (9 October 1926 – 21 February 1999) was a Finnish engineer, businessman and vuorineuvos.

After graduating from Helsinki University of Technology, Gillberg worked in machine import business and then for Fiskars in different manager positions. He is best known as the General Manager of heavy vehicle producer Suomen Autoteollisuus, later Sisu-Auto, which he modernised thoroughly between 1971 and 1983. He was finally moved from office by the owner, state of Finland, because the company could not reach its financial targets.

The rest of his career Gillberg worked in various positions of trust and consulting younger managers.

Gillberg was married and he had four children.

== Studies and early career ==
Gillberg was born in Hämeenlinna, Southern Finland. His parents were engineer, sales manager Oskar Rafael Gillberg and Hedwig née Heller. He did his abitur at Helsinki Finnish Upper Secondary School in 1944 and continued his studies in Mechanical Engineering Faculty of the Helsinki University of Technology. After graduating diplomi-insinööri in 1950 Gillberg worked in tractor, transportation vehicle and engine import business first for Kesko, then as general manager for Transporter and after that as marketing manager for Konetuote. In 1961 Gillberg was appointed general manager of Sesamia, which developed equipment for geological researching. Gillberg moved to Fiskars in 1964, first to manage technical sales, and from 1967 he led the product development.

== General Manager of Suomen Autoteollisuus ==
In 1971 Gillberg was selected the General Manager of the Sisu vehicle producer Suomen Autoteollisuus to replace the owner-manager Tor Nessling, who had led the company patriarchally for nearly four decades. The board of SAT wanted to choose a such manager who would modernise the organisation and grow the company.

Gillberg began to lead the company to a modern, more delegating management culture. He gave more responsibility and decision-making power to the department managers and with his own example Gillberg started to democratise the organisation, that had been constructed strictly hierarchical during Nessling's era. At the beginning he astounded the older and most class conscious co-workers by walking into the company canteen casually in shirtsleeves.

With his own example and optimism Gillberg managed to motivate the SAT organisation to further efforts.

SAT became state-owned company in 1975 and was no more listed in the stock exchange. This brought Gillberg new challenges – in addition to the business environment, he also had to handle the political pressure.

=== Tripartite agreement ===
The annual production of Leyland is 80 000 lorries and Scania more than 20 000. It is hard to believe, that a such organisation could not sell a couple of thousand such Sisu's, for which Leyland or Scania does not have a corresponding model. The capacity extension, that our tripling production requires, will cost roughly 100 million marks and will create three hundred new jobs.

— Erik Gillberg, 1976,

A so-called tripartite agreement, that brought British Leyland and Saab-Scania partial owners of the company, was signed in October 1976.

However, the great expectations of the partnership failed because of the bankruptcy of British Leyland and rumours of a merger between Scania and Volvo.

=== Investment programme ===
Gillberg became also the chairman of SAT in 1977. The lorry, bus chassis and special vehicle producer went through an extensive product renewal under Gillberg's leadership. The company grew fast; its turnover was 119 million marks in 1971 and in 1983 it reached 609 million. Gillberg led the company through a massive investment program. The production was changed to order based principle which improved the small company's flexibility to answer the customer requirements.

==== Moni-Sisu bus chassis ====
In 1978 SAT presented the modulised Sisu SB "Moni-Sisu" ("Multi-Sisu") chassis on which could be built many different types of buses and special vehicles. The chassis consisted of five modules, of which each could be tailored according to the customer need without touching the other modules.

==== S-series lorries ====
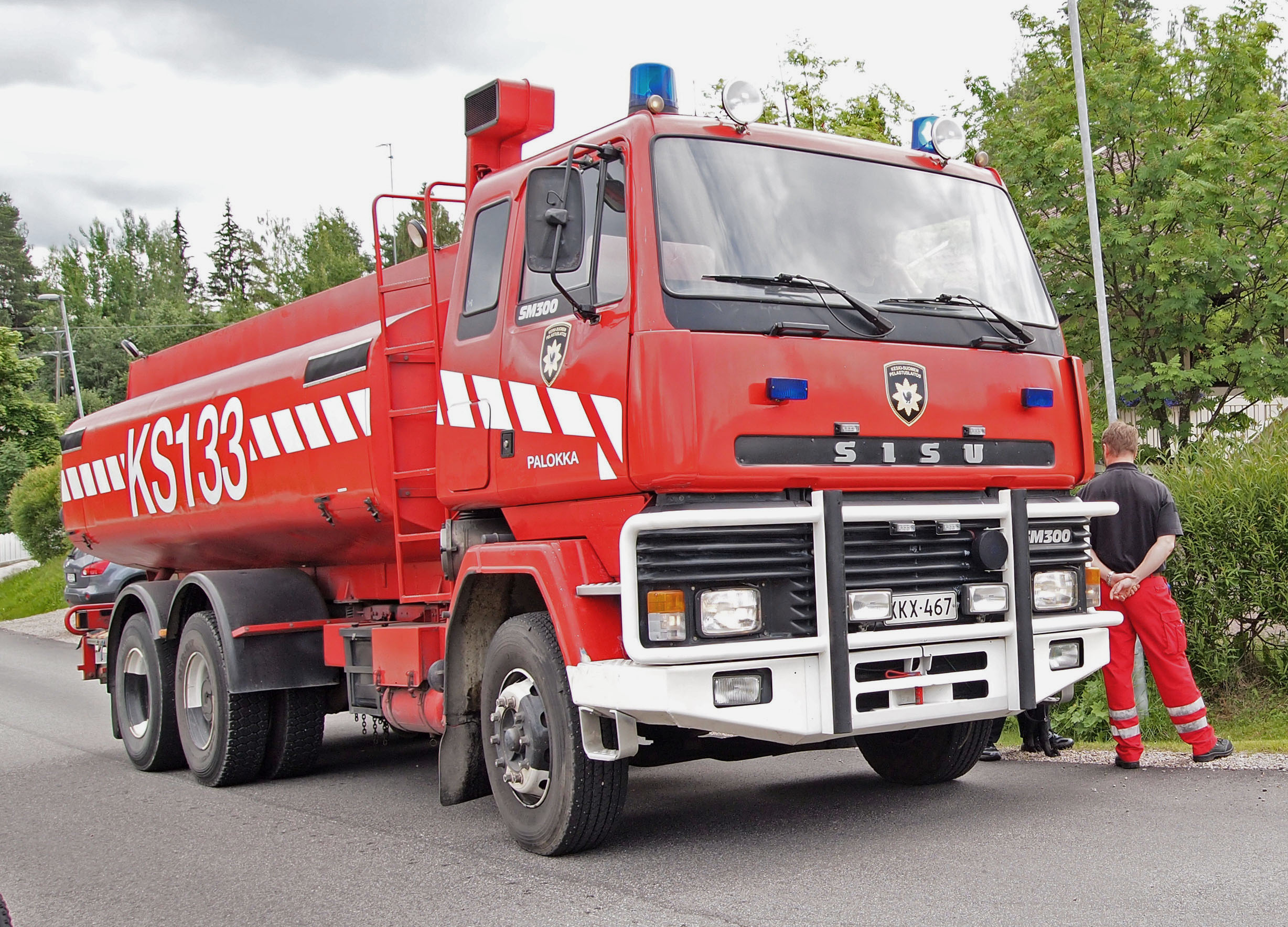
An example of the modulised S-series: Sisu SM 300 fire engine. Model SM is with a high forward control cabin.

In 1977 SAT started a project for modernising of lorries. The new range, S-series, was launched at the beginning of the 1980s. The first model was SK 150 which entered the market in 1980. A significant feature was modulised cabin that enabled use of the same structure in both conventional and forward control models with minor changes. Despite being a small producer, Sisu could offer a very large selection of lorries for various purposes because of highly modulised construction. The S-series was received well in the market and remained technically competitive over the whole decade.

==== Military vehicle production ====
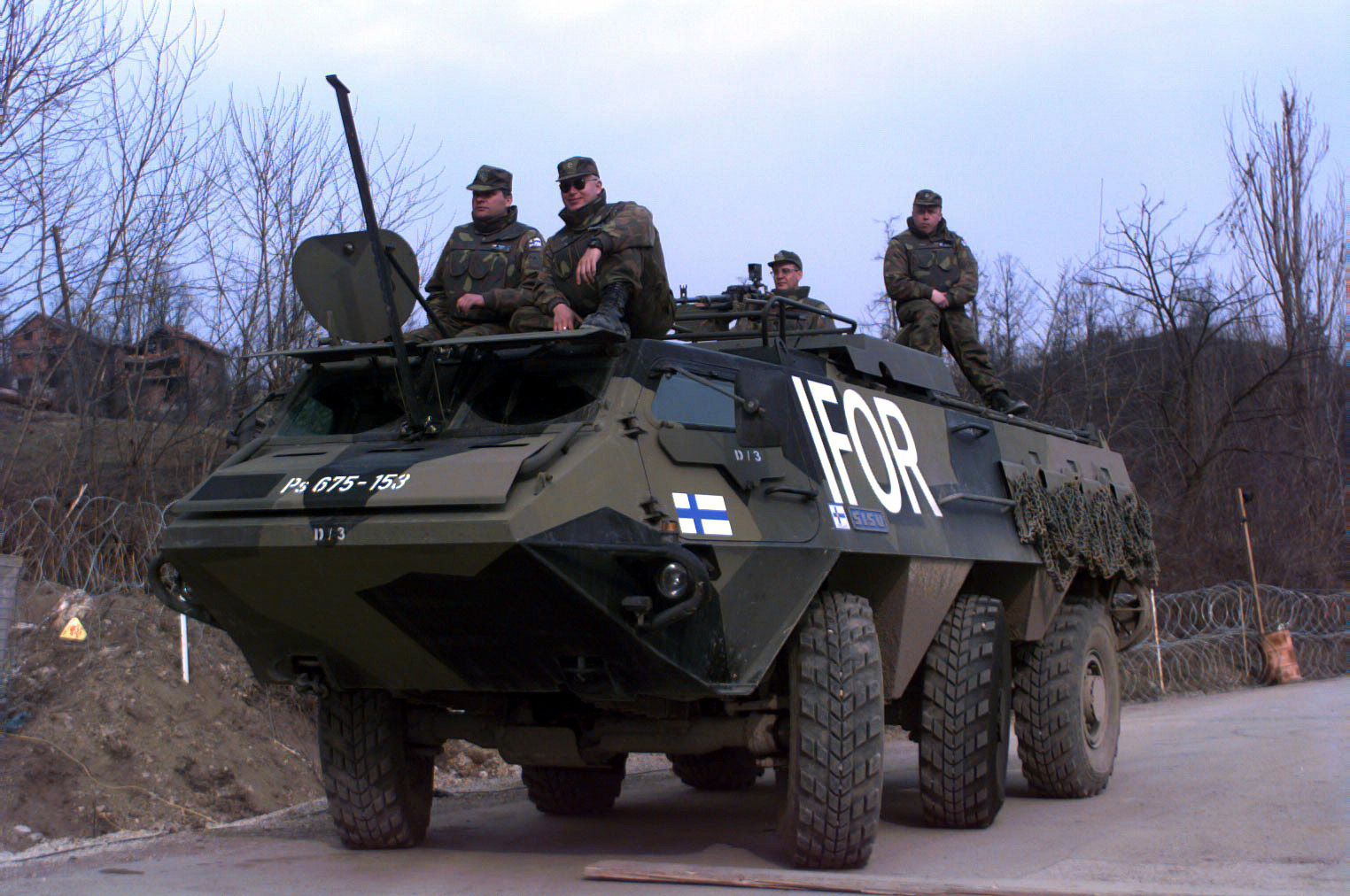
Sisu XA-180 "Pasi" armoured personnel carrier.

The company focused increasingly on military vehicles; in 1979 the military vehicle engineering was collected in one organisation. The department, which was later named Sisu Defence, developed many successful vehicles, such as SA-150, SA-240, and most important, the armoured XA-180.

==== Markets and facilities ====
The company name was changed Oy Sisu-Auto Ab in 1981. In the domestic market Sisu was the leading make among the heaviest vehicles, such as earthmoving, road maintenance and logging trucks. Share of exports reached 23% at its best. The major export articles were terminal tractors, in which Sisu-Auto became the leader in European market, and military vehicles, XA-180 in particular. Terrain capability was one of the core competences of the company. The assembly plants were located in Helsinki, Karis and Hämeenlinna. The company opened a new facility in Mäntyharju for plastic component production in 1977. The decision was influenced by political control; Finland was suffering of high unemployment rate and the government pressed the company board, which was appointed on political grounds, to move production to an area where the unemployment rate was high.

=== End of Gillberg's era ===
The state, which was the main owner of Sisu-Auto, was not satisfied with Gillberg's work because the renewal of the model range consumed quickly the savings which were reached before. Gillberg was removed from the office at the end of 1983 and replaced by Jorma S. Jerkku, who immediately started a heavy reorganisation programme.

Sampo Siiskonen, the former sales manager of Sisu-Auto and close colleague of Gillberg, has later criticised the way how Gillberg was treated by the main owner. He believed that Gillberg had potential to do much better but his leadership was too much affected by politicians and therefore his possibilities to develop the company on commercial basis were limited.

== Positions of trust ==
After Sisu-Auto Gillberg worked as board member for Nescor Partners which was a company that offered the know-how of senior managers for the younger generation. Gillberg wrote the 20-year history book of the company. He had positions of trust in business and industry organisations and insurance and banking companies.

== Political career ==
Gillberg was in Espoo municipality council between 1961 and 1968 as a National Coalition Party member. Education was one of the main areas of his interest.

== Family ==
Gillberg was married in 1950 with Aila Annikki née Viljanen (born 1929). The couple had three daughters and one boy born between 1951 and 1962.

== Sources ==
- Nygrén, Helge (1981). Sisu Suomen ja maailman maanteillä (in Finnish). Karis: Oy Suomen Autoteollisuus Ab. ISBN 951-99315-4-6.
- Blomberg, Olli (2006). Suomalaista Sisua vuodesta 1931 – Monialaosaajasta kuorma-autotehtaaksi (in Finnish). Karis: Oy Sisu Auto Ab. ISBN 952-91-4918-2.
- Mäkipirtti, Markku. Sisu. Ajoneuvot Suomessa (in Finnish). Vol. 4 (2. ed.). Tampere: Apali Oy. ISBN 978-952-5877-05-2.
