= Volvo LV81-series =

Volvo LV80/90-series
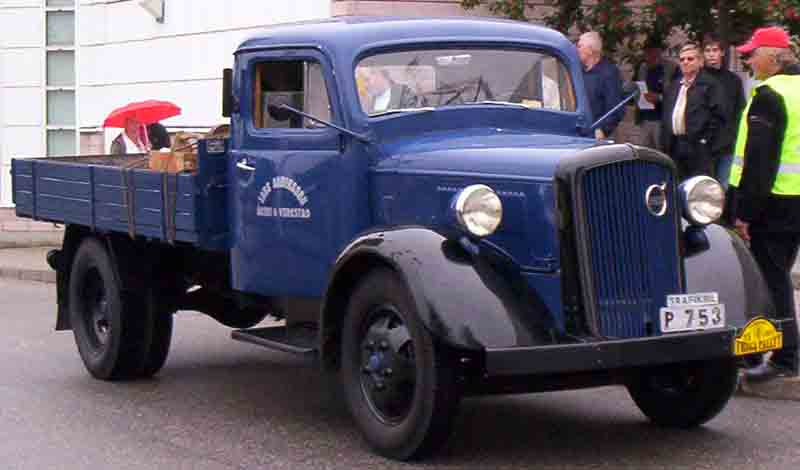

Overview
- Manufacturer: Volvo
- Production: 1935–1940, approx. 11,500 produced

Body and chassis
- Class: Medium size truck

Powertrain
- Engine: Volvo inline 6
- Transmission: 4 speed non-syncro manual

Dimensions
- Wheelbase: 3.4 m (133.9 in) – 4.7 m (185.0 in)
- Curb weight: 5,400 kg (11,905.0 lb) – 7,000 kg (15,432.4 lb) (gross weight)

Chronology
- Predecessor: Volvo LV71-series
- Successor: Volvo Roundnose

The Volvo LV80/90-series was a medium size truck produced by Swedish automaker Volvo between 1935 and 1940.

== History ==
Volvo presented a new medium-sized truck in 1935. The truck was available in two versions: the smaller LV80-series, with a side-valve engine and the larger LV90-series, with an overhead valve engine. On this generation of trucks the engine and cab was moved forward so that the engine was mounted above the front axle, not behind as before. This gives a better load distribution between the front and rear axle, resulting in reduced rear axle load.

After a year the older DC engine of the LV90-series was replaced by the bigger FC engine. Both engines were offered in Hesselman version.

== Engines ==
Model	Year	Engine	Displacement	Power	Type
LV81-86	1935–40	Volvo EC: I6 sv	3,670 cc (224 cu in)	75 bhp (56 kW)	Petrol engine
LV93-95	1935	Volvo DC: I6 ohv	4,097 cc (250.0 cu in)	75 bhp (56 kW)	Petrol engine
LV93-95	1935	Volvo HA: I6 ohv	4,097 cc (250.0 cu in)	75 bhp (56 kW)	Hesselman engine
LV93-95	1936–39	Volvo FC: I6 ohv	4,394 cc (268.1 cu in)	90 bhp (67 kW)	Petrol engine
LV93-95	1936–39	Volvo FCH: I6 ohv	4,394 cc (268.1 cu in)	90 bhp (67 kW)	Hesselman engine

== Gallery ==
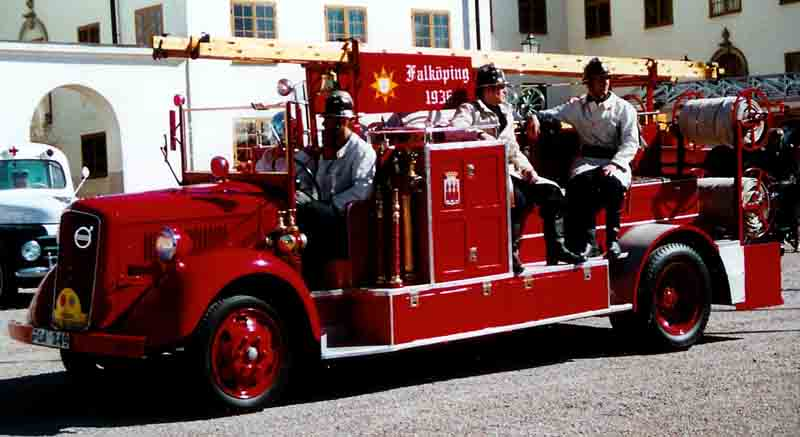
1936 Volvo LV84 fire engine.

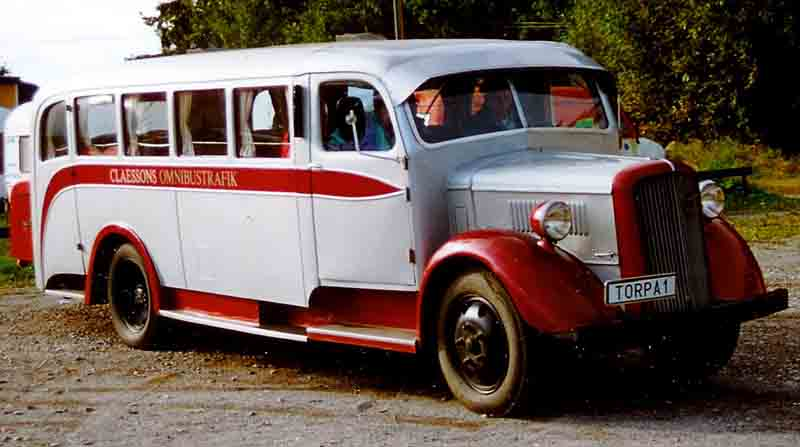
1938 Volvo LV84 bus.

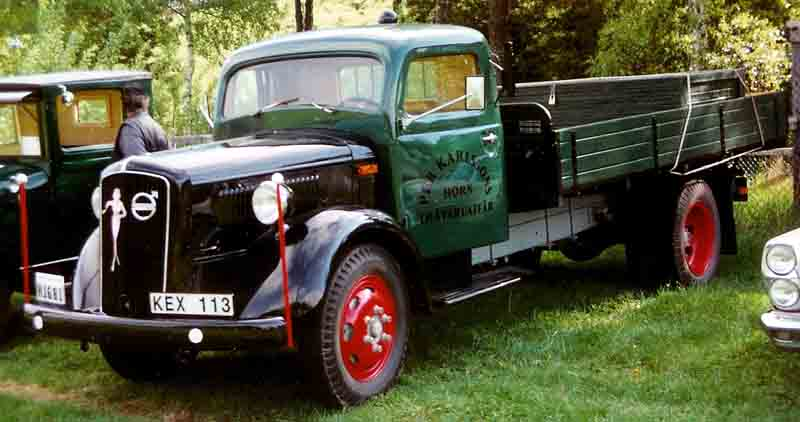
1937 Volvo LV94.
