= Lars Wilhelm Åberg =

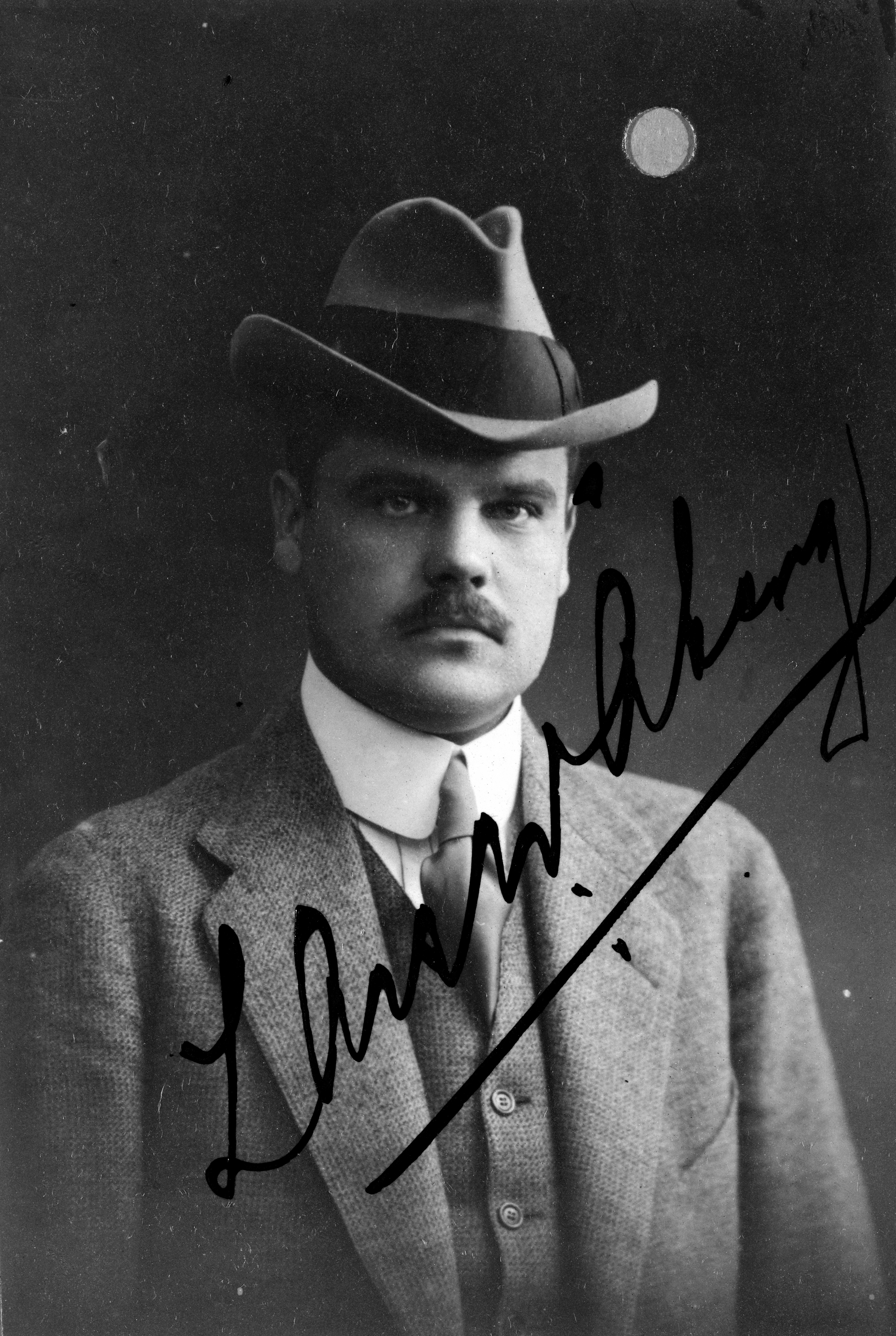
- Born: 19 December 1879; Hausjärvi, Finland
- Died: 21 January 1942 (aged 62); Helsinki, Finland
- Education: Helsinki Polytechnical Institute
- Occupation: General Manager
- Spouse: Sylvi Helena Antman

Manager of Helsinki City Electricity Works
- In office 1916–1918

Manager of Wärtsilä
- In office 1918–1928
- Succeeded by: Wilhelm Wahlforss

Lars Wilhelm Åberg (19 December 1879 – 21 January 1942) was a Finnish engineer and businessman. He was the General Manager of Wärtsilä and co-founder of Suomen Autoteollisuus (SAT).

== Early years ==
Lars Wilhelm Åberg was born in Hausjärvi to Senior Master Builder, Depot Manager Lars Erik Åberg and Mathilda Maria née Rosvall. He graduated in 1898 in Swedish speaking Helsingfors reallyceum in Helsinki, after which he studied engineering in Helsinki Polytechnical Institute. He graduated in 1902 after which he studied for one year in Dresden.

== Career ==
After his graduation Åberg worked for a number of companies. He became the manager of Helsinki City Electricity Works where he worked until 1918, when he was appointed General Manager of Wärtsilä iron works. Simultaneously, he managed Ab Hämekoski and Ab Karelia Wood.

Wärtsilä dived into financial trouble during Åberg's leadership. The annual result of 1925 showed losses of 1.6 million marks; the company debt reached 46 million marks when the sales were just 16 million. In March 1926 Åberg announced resignation, which came into force in 15. April. He was replaced by Wilhelm Wahlforss. Later it turned out that Åberg had also hidden a remarkable gap in the inventory.

Already starting from 13 March Åberg was appointed the board chairman of automobile coach builder Autokoritehdas. Despite its relatively good order book, the company was continuously in lack of cash reserves. The creditors pushed the company to join its operations with its competitor Autoteollisuus-Bilindustri. This took place on 20 March 1931, when Åberg together with Karl Arthur Nordgren and Emil Anton Winckelmann sent to the Ministry of Trade and Industry an application for starting a new company. This was the beginning of lorry and bus producer Suomen Autoteollisuus. Åberg became a minority shareholder in the new company.

== Personal life ==
Åberg was married to Sylvi Helena née Antman. The couple remained childless, and when Åberg died in 1942, he bequeathed a large sum of money to Swedish Academy of Engineering Sciences in Finland. The academy wrote a glowing obituary about him. When Åberg's successor in Wärtsilä, Wilhelm Wahlforss heard about this, he tried to prevent its publishing fiercely, referring to Åberg's neglectful leadership of the company. The obituary was eventually published, but it took place as late as in 1946.

== Sources ==
- Zilliacus, Benedict (1984). Wilhelm Wahlforss (in Finnish). Translated from Swedish by Riitta Valajärvi. Porvoo: Oy Wärtsilä Ab. ISBN 951-99541-8-X.
