= Volvo LV71-series =

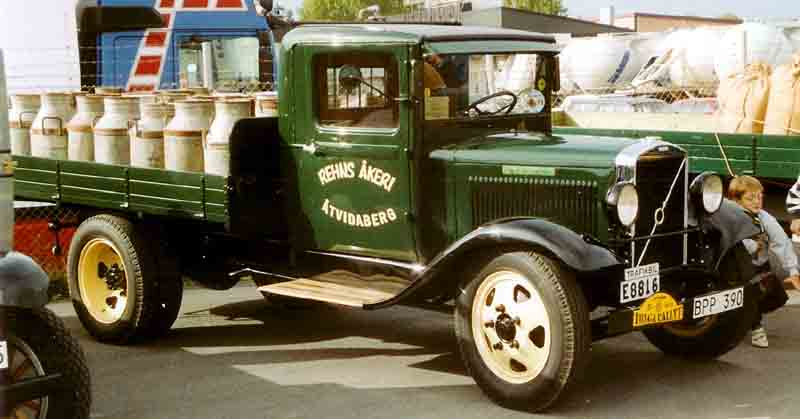

Overview
- Manufacturer: Volvo Trucks
- Production: 1932–1935; approx. 4,700 produced

Body and chassis
- Class: Medium size truck
- Body style: Conventional (LV71-74); Cab over (LV75)

Powertrain
- Engine: 3,366 cc (3.4 L) EB I6
- Transmission: 4 speed non-syncro manual

Dimensions
- Wheelbase: 3.4–4.1 m (133.9–161.4 in)
- Curb weight: 4,750–5,200 kg (10,472–11,464 lb) (gross weight)

Chronology
- Successor: Volvo LV81-series

The Volvo LV71-series was a medium size truck produced by Swedish automaker Volvo between 1932 and 1935.

== History ==
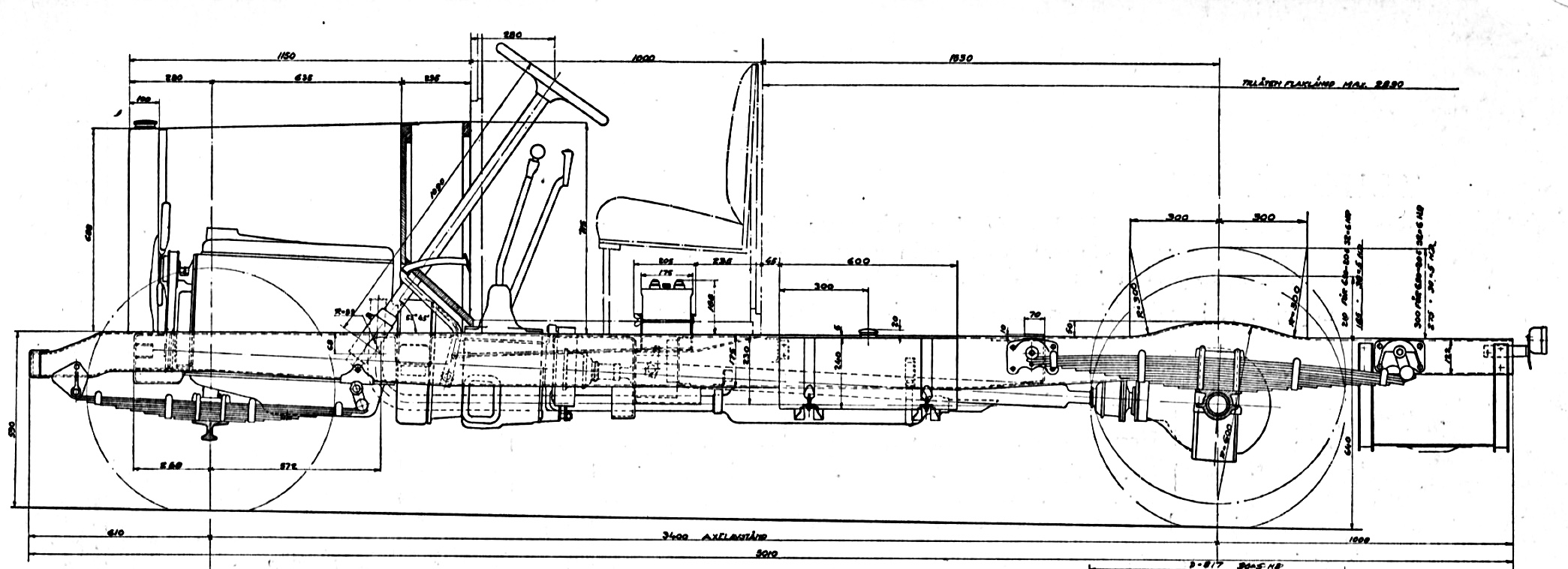
Volvo LV71 Side view.

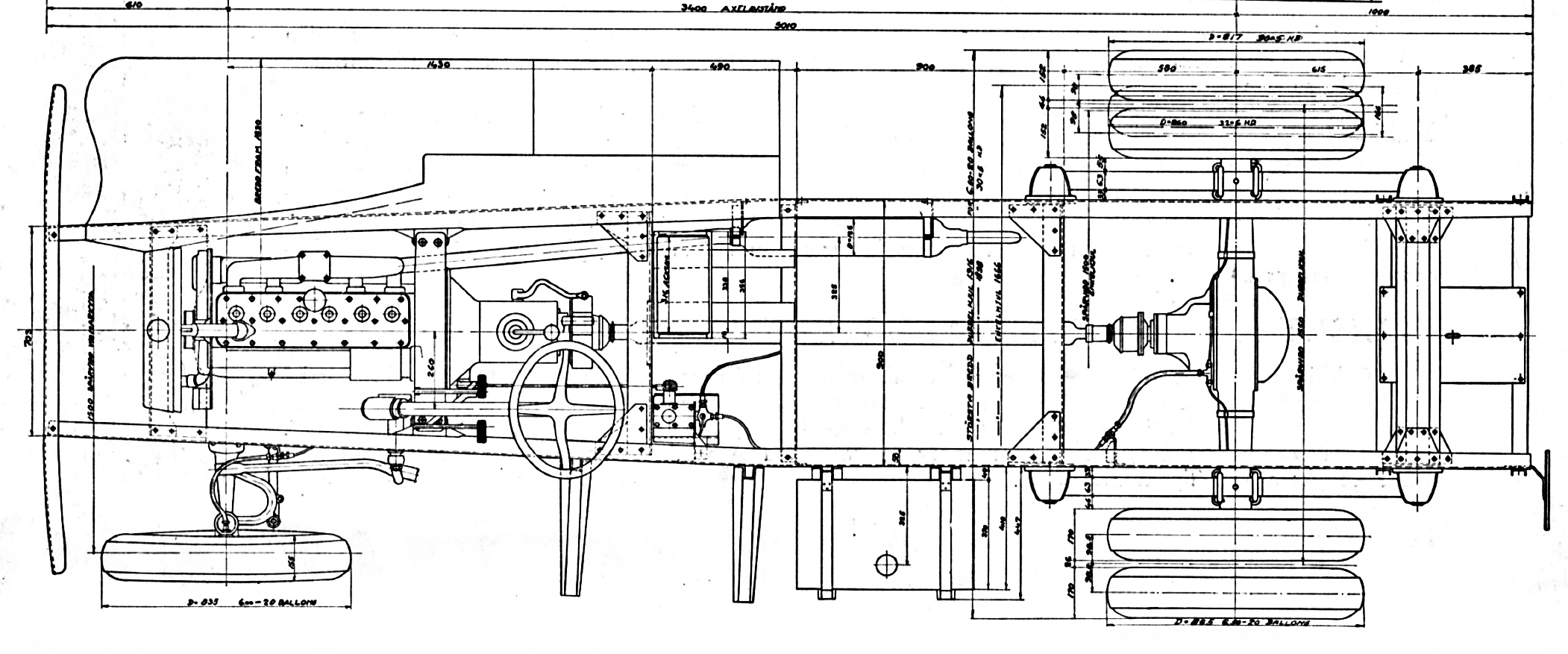
Volvo LV 71 top view.

Volvo introduced the LV71-series in the spring of 1932. The truck was built on two different wheelbases: 3.4 and 4.1 m. There were two weight classes: LV71 and LV72 with a payload of 2.5 tonnes and LV73 and LV74 with a payload of 3 tonnes. The six-cylinder engine had a displacement of 3268 cc. The bore was 79.4 mm and the stroke was 110 mm. The maximum power output was 65 hp. The LV 71 had a wheelbase of 3400 mm. The LV 72 had a wheelbase of 4100 mm. The frame length ( LV 71 ) was 5010 mm. The front track width was 1500 mm, and the rear track width was 1550 mm. The fuel tank had a capacity of 50 liters.

The medium-sized truck series also included Volvo's first forward control truck, LV75. The cab was moved forward so that the driver sat beside the engine instead of the gear box like a conventional truck. This gives a better weight distribution between the front and rear axle, resulting in reduced rear axle load.

== Gallery ==
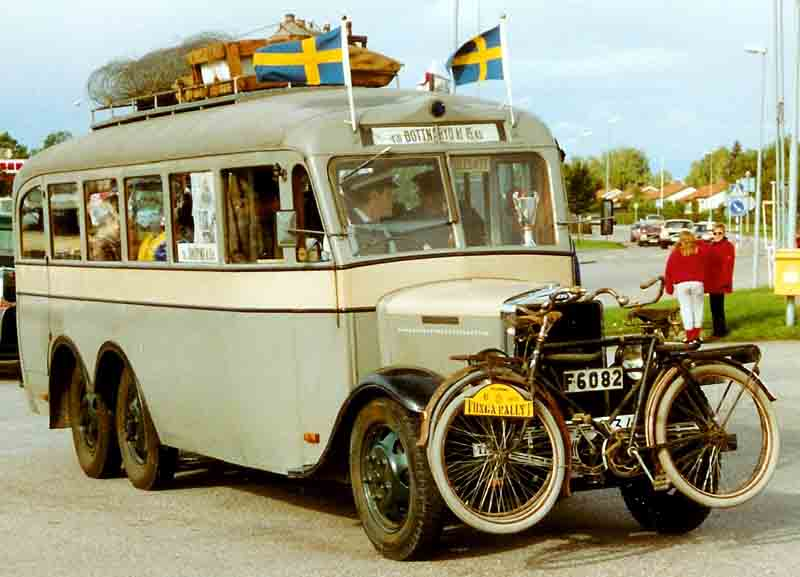
1935 Volvo LV72 bus.

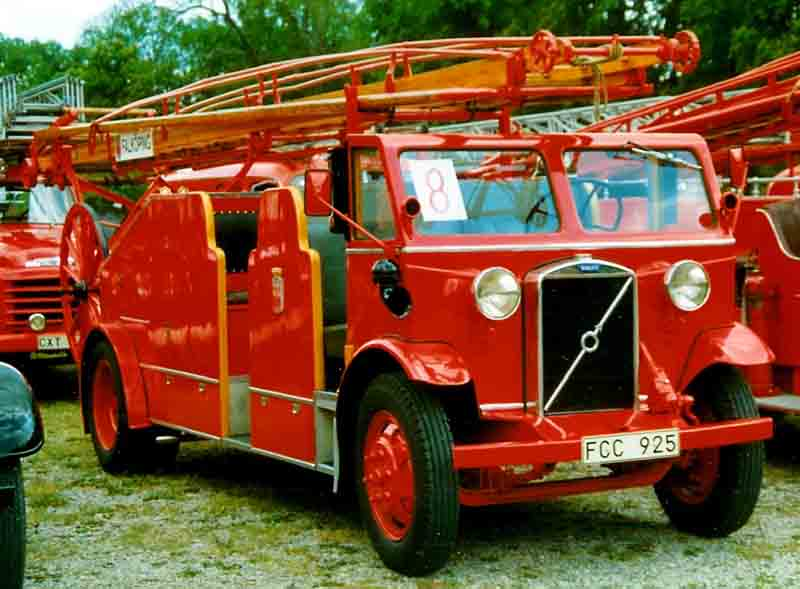
1934 Volvo LV75 fire engine.
