= Volvo LV66-series =

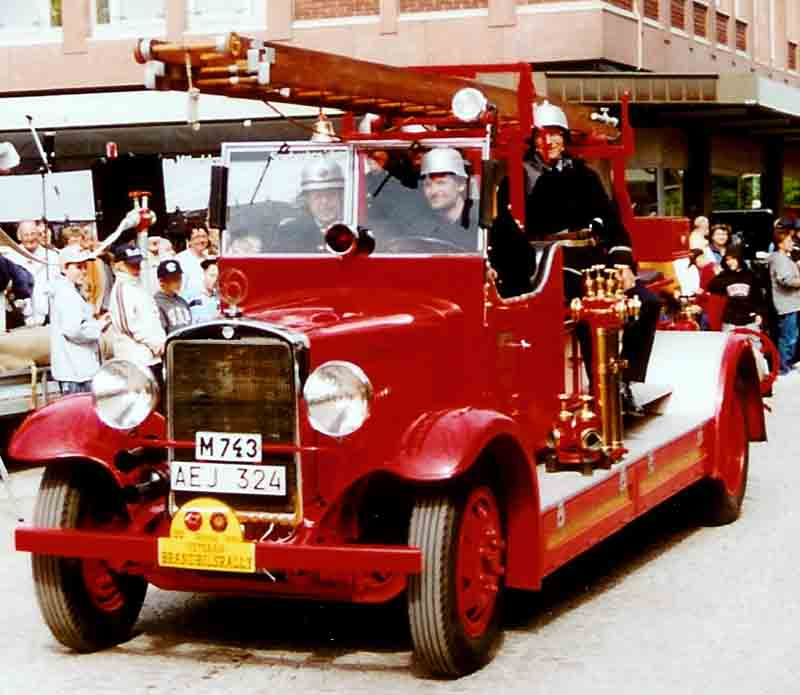

Overview
- Manufacturer: Volvo
- Production: 1931–1936, approx. 2,370 produced

Body and chassis
- Class: Medium/heavy duty truck

Powertrain
- Engine: Penta ohv inline 6
- Transmission: 4 speed non-syncro manual

Dimensions
- Wheelbase: 3.4 m (133.9 in) – 4.6 m (181.1 in)
- Curb weight: 6,000 kg (13,227.7 lb) – 9,500 kg (20,943.9 lb) (gross weight)

Chronology
- Successor: Volvo Longnose

The Volvo LV66-70 was a truck produced by Swedish automaker Volvo between 1931 and 1936.

== History ==
Volvo introduced its first heavy truck in 1931. Unlike its smaller sibling, who used some elements from Volvo's passenger cars, the LV66-series components were built exclusively for truck use. These included a new overhead valve engine, a heavy duty four-speed gear box, steel rims and four-wheel hydraulic brakes.

The truck was built in two weight classes: the smaller LV68 and LV69 with a payload of 3.25 tonnes and the heavier LV66 and LV67 with a payload of 3.5 tonnes. From 1933 the LV66 and LV67 could be delivered with a trailing axle which increased the payload to 5.25 tonnes. The long wheelbase LV70 was primarily equipped with bus bodies.

From 1933 the LV66-series were sold with a Hesselman engine as an alternative.

== Engines ==
Model	Year	Engine	Displacement	Power	Type
LV66-70	1931–36	Penta DC: I6 ohv	4,097 cc (250.0 cu in)	75 bhp (56 kW)	Petrol engine
LV66-70	1933–36	Penta HA: I6 ohv	4,097 cc (250.0 cu in)	75 bhp (56 kW)	Hesselman engine
