= Autoteollisuus-Bilindustri =

O.Y. Autoteollisuus – A.B. Bilindustri
- Company type: osakeyhtiö
- Industry: automotive
- Predecessor: Munkkisaaren Autotalli ja Konepaja
- Founded: 25 June 1928
- Founder: Mauritz Packalén
- Defunct: 20 October 1932
- Fate: discontinued after putting together its operations with O/Y Autokoritehdas
- Successor: O/Y Suomen Autoteollisuus A/B
- Headquarters: Helsinki, Finland
- Products: bus coaches and lorry cabins
- Owner: Mauritz Packalén; Birger Holmström; Arne Söderberg

O.Y. Autoteollisuus – A.B. Bilindustri was a bus coach and lorry cabin builder which operated in Helsinki, Finland in 1928–1932.

The company was founded by Mauritz Packalén and it built coaches and cabins mainly on Chevrolet and G.M.C. chassis. After falling into financial problems, the funding banks forced the company to put together its operations with the neighbouring competitor O/Y Autokoritehdas; this led to foundation of O/Y Suomen Autoteollisuus A/B.

== Background ==
Mauritz Packalén, a Helsinki businessman who had gained experience in automobile business, founded together with Gustaf Wrede, Birger Sourander and Birger Holmström a company called O.Y. Henry-Auto A.B. for automobile trading in 1924. At an early stage Henry-Auto and Metro-Auto Oy founded jointly Munkkisaaren Autotalli ja Konepaja, "Munkkisaari garage and engineering works". The line of business was officially "automobile coach production, automobile repairing and retail". However, it was soon discontinued, as Metro-Auto gave up with the business.

== Foundation ==
Packalén invested the funds which had remained from Munkkisaaren Autotalli ja Konepaja on new company, O.Y. Autoteollisuus – A.B. Bilindustri; the name means "automobile industry" both in Finnish and Swedish. A suitable location was found in Fleming Street in Kallio, Helsinki where were many workshops and also a plenty of skilled workers. The new company continued the operation of its predecessor.

== Ownership and management ==
At the initial stage the major owner was Packalén and other shareholders were Birger Holmström and Arne Söderberg. Later Söderberg sold his part and Gustaf Wrede became an owner with a minor share. At the beginning Packalén was both the chair and General Manager; Kosti Nieminen held the manager's post for some time until Packalén took it again. However, he was not willing to stay on the leadership, but gave it to young engineer Tor Nessling at the end of 1929. Nessling remained the manager until the company was discontinued.

== Operation ==
Autoteollisuus-Bilindustri built partnership with the Swedish subsidiary of General Motors; the initial plan was building coaches and cabins on Chevrolet and G.M.C. chassis for the Swedish market, but the Swedish operators preferred the domestically produced Scania-Vabis, Tidaholm and Volvo chassis; moreover, there was a strong local coachbuilding industry. Eventually the project lead to producing of vehicles for the Finnish market.

The company started negotiations with the Swedish Volvo about building of lorries in Finland from Volvo parts. Although Nessling's calculations showed the business to be profitable, the project led only to importing of a few Volvo chassis. Finally there were not capable domestic component suppliers, so Autoteollisuus-Bilindustri had to use more Volvo parts than originally planned.

== Creating Suomen Autoteollisuus ==
Autoteollisuus-Bilindustri, as well as its neighbouring competitor O/Y Autokoritehdas, had major financial problems. The banks, which were funding both companies, pressed them to put together their operations. This took place in April 1931, when O/Y Suomen Autoteollisuus A/B (SAT) was established by Lars Wilhelm Åberg, Karl Arthur Nordgren and Emil Anton Winckelmann. Unlike often thought, incorrectly, SAT was not created through a merger. It was founded jointly between the two companies and both Autoteollisuus-Bilindustri as well as Autokoritehdas moved their operations gradually under the new organisation thereafter. As soon as the process was completed, both companies were discontinued; for Autoteollisuus-Bilindustri this happened 20 October 1932.
