= Volvo Titan =

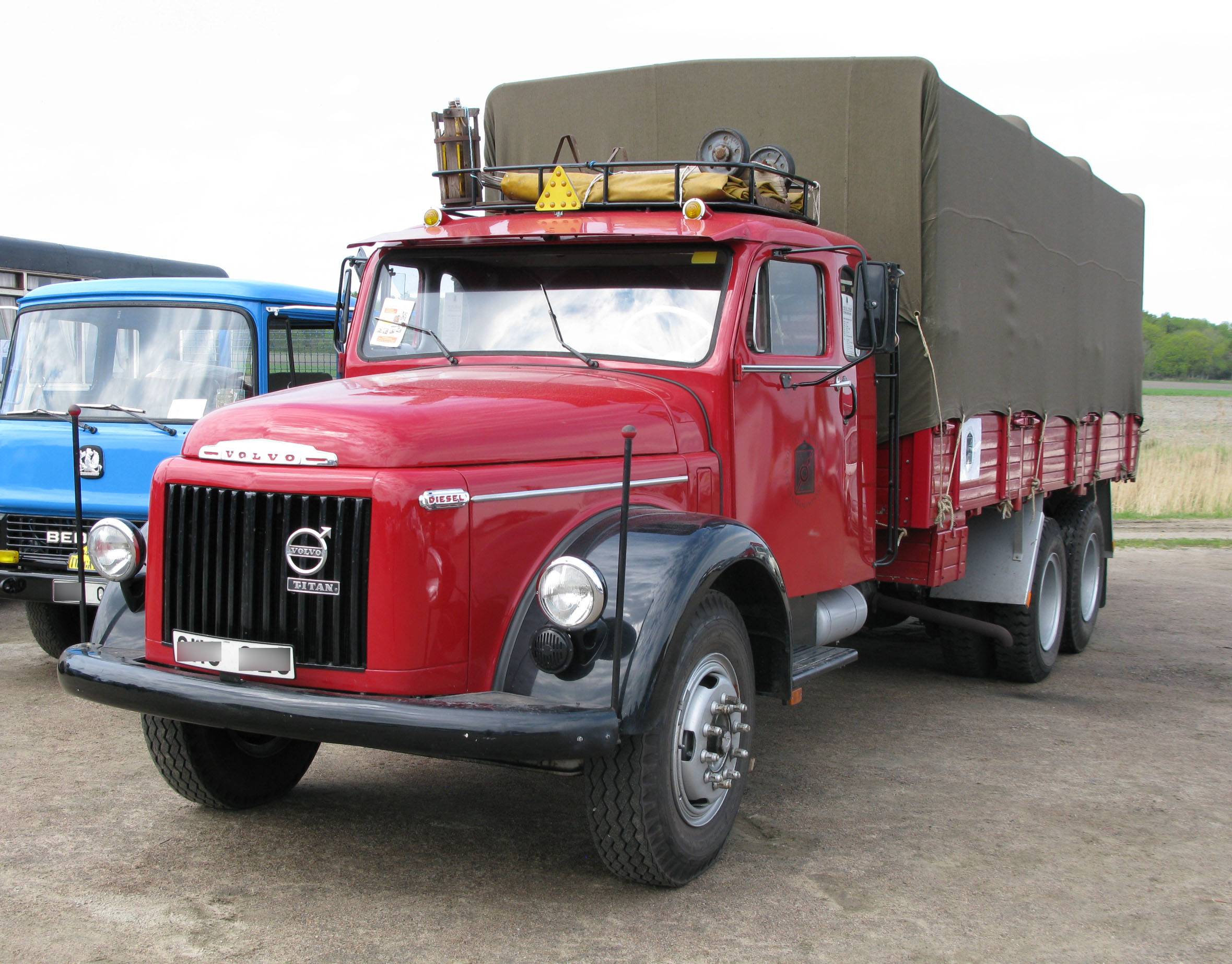

Overview
- Manufacturer: Volvo
- Also called: Volvo L395–495
- Production: 1951–1973 approx. 39,700 produced

Body and chassis
- Class: Heavy duty truck

Powertrain
- Engine: Volvo ohv I6 diesel engine

Dimensions
- Curb weight: 12,000–25,800 kg (26,500–56,900 lb) (gross weight)

Chronology
- Predecessor: Volvo Longnose
- Successor: Volvo N10

The Volvo Titan was a heavy duty truck produced by Swedish automaker Volvo between 1951 and 1973.

== Volvo Titan ==
In the autumn of 1951 Volvo introduced its largest truck L395 Titan, with a payload capacity of up to 10 tonnes. The large VDF engine was replaced in 1953 with the further developed D96 engine. The following year, the Titan became the first Volvo truck to be offered with a turbodiesel. In 1956 the truck was equipped with air brakes.

1959 saw the introduction of the refined L495 Titan. In 1964 Volvo introduced the forward control L4951 Titan Tiptop with a tilting cab.

== Volvo N88 ==
In 1965 Volvo introduced its "System 8". As part of the changes Volvo presented a successor to the Titan, called N88. The new truck retained the Titan's cab, but underneath it the conventional N88 sported all the new features of the forward control F88. These included a new engine, a fully synchronized eight-speed gear box and improved chassis and suspension.

== Engines ==
Model	Year	Engine	Displacement	Power	Type
L395	1951–52	Volvo VDF: I6 ohv	9,602 cc (585.9 cu in)	150 bhp (112 kW)	Diesel engine
L395-495	1953–65	Volvo D96: I6 ohv	9,602 cc (585.9 cu in)	150 bhp (112 kW)	Diesel engine
L395-495	1954–65	Volvo TD96: I6 ohv	9,602 cc (585.9 cu in)	185 bhp (138 kW)	Turbodiesel
N88	1965–73	Volvo D100: I6 ohv	9,602 cc (585.9 cu in)	200 bhp (149 kW)	Diesel engine
N88	1965–73	Volvo TD100: I6 ohv	9,602 cc (585.9 cu in)	260 bhp (194 kW)	Turbodiesel

== Gallery ==
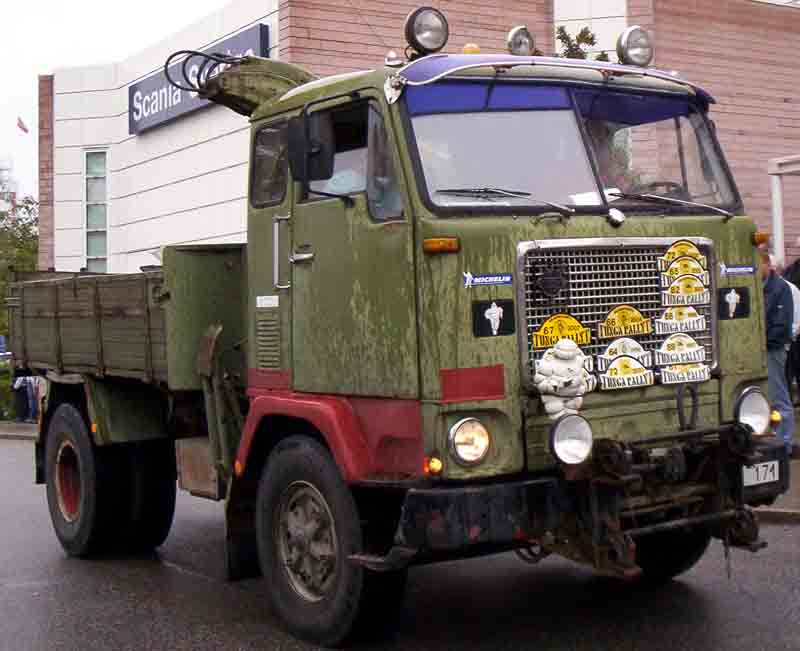
1965 Volvo Titan Tiptop

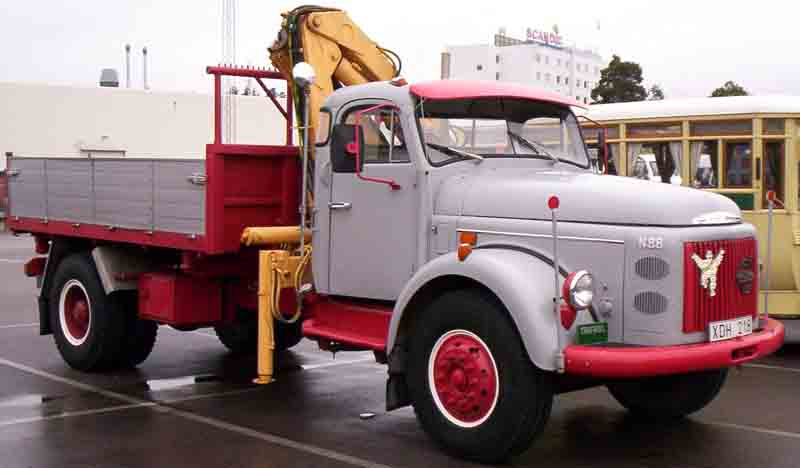
1973 Volvo N88
