= Autokoritehdas =

Finnish bus and lorry builder (1923–1933)

O/Y Autokoritehdas
- Company type: osakeyhtiö
- Industry: automotive
- Founded: 16 May 1923
- Founder: Urho Hammer
- Defunct: 21 March 1933
- Fate: discontinued after putting together its operations with O.Y. Autoteollisuus – A.B. Bilindustri
- Successor: O/Y Suomen Autoteollisuus A/B
- Headquarters: Helsinki, Finland
- Products: bus coaches and lorry cabins
- Services: automobile reparation
- Owner: Urho Hammer; Kusti Hagelin; Lauri Nordström

O/Y Autokoritehdas was a bus coach and lorry cabin builder which operated in Helsinki, Finland from 1923 to 1933.

The main founder of the company was Finnish American Urho Hammer, who returned from the US to his native Finland to start automotive industry. Autokoritehdas struggled in financially difficult circumstances, and in response joined activities with its competitor and neighbour O.Y. Autoteollisuus – A.B. Bilindustri, creating O/Y Suomen Autoteollisuus A/B in 1931.

== Foundation ==
The company founder was Urho Hammer, who had got automotive education and gained experience in coachbuilding in Michigan, USA in the 1910s. He returned to Finland in 1921, after which he presumably run some kind of coachbuilding activity before setting up the company Autokoritehdas, "automobile coach factory", in 1923 together with Kalle Kustaa Luoto and Kusti Jalo Hagelin. The company owners were Hammer, who owned 594 shares, Hagelin with four shares and Lauri Nordström, who had two shares. The General Manager was Yrjö Uotila.

The company was set up from virtually blank paper, as for the initial start was needed loans for total 160 000 marks. The line of business was officially "automotive industry, building of automobile bodies in particular". Uotila was removed from office in December 1925 and the new manager was appointed Einar Juho Emil Rinne starting from January 1926; in the same March the company got a new chair Lars Wilhelm Åberg.

== Financial troubles ==
After a couple of years the company suffered from lack of assets, despite a fairly good order book, and Autokoritehdas got loans from different banks to be able to run its operation. An obligatory insurance for workers was required from January 1928; to be able to pay it the company made a special arrangement, according to which the workers were insured, but in case of an accident the company would have to pay the costs itself. In the same August Autokoritehdas pledged its property in Fleming Street 34.

The company activities covered also vehicle repairs. The coachbuilding business was finally got to a good start at the end of 1928. A major setback came in 1930, when one of the main customers Pääkaupungin Auto Oy bankrupted. Autokoritehdas got office furniture as payment for the debts.

== Creation of Suomen Autoteollisuus ==
The banks, which had been funding the business, pressed Autokoritehdas to negotiate the neighbouring company, O.Y. Autoteollisuus – A.B. Bilindustri, which was suffering of the same problems, about putting together their operations. This took place on 1 April 1931 when Åberg, Karl Arthur Nordgren and Emil Anton Winckelmann left an application to Ministry of Trade and Industry to create a new company O/Y Suomen Autoteollisuus A/B (SAT).

Unlike sometimes incorrectly claimed, creation of SAT did not happen through a merger. SAT was set up jointly by Autokoritehdas and Autoteollisuus – Bilindustri and as soon the operations were transferred under SAT, both companies were discontinued; for Autokoritehdas this happened on 21 March 1933.
