= Turbo-diesel =

Diesel engine with a turbocharger

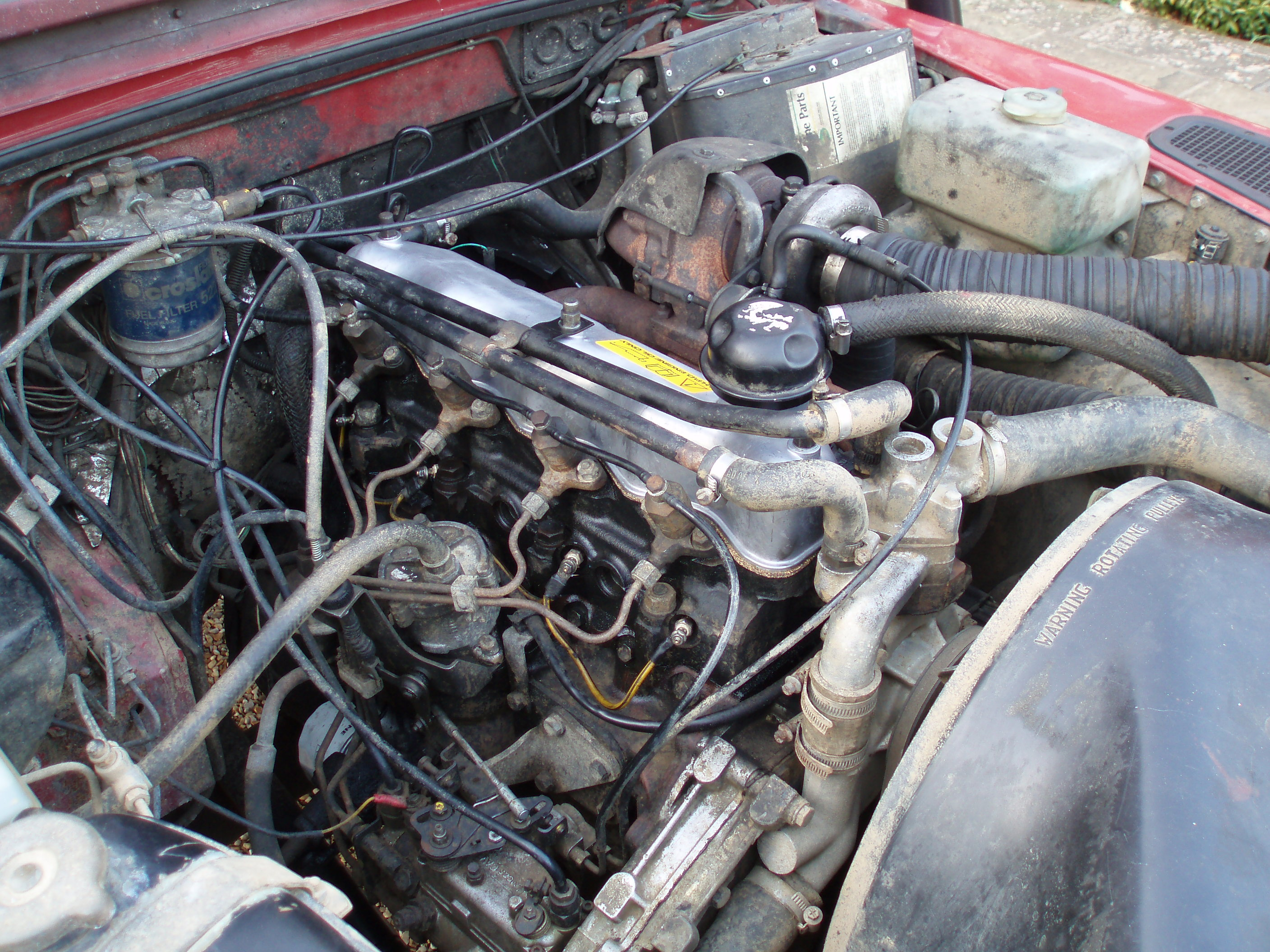
1990 Land Rover 19J engine (turbocharger is towards the top-right corner of image)

The term turbo-diesel, also written as turbodiesel and turbo diesel, refers to any diesel engine equipped with a turbocharger. As with other engine types, turbocharging a diesel engine can significantly increase its efficiency and power output, especially when used in combination with an intercooler.

Turbocharging of diesel engines began in the 1920s with large marine and stationary engines. Trucks became available with turbo-diesel engines in the mid-1950s, followed by passenger cars in the late 1970s. Since the 1990s, the compression ratio of turbo-diesel engines has been dropping.

== Principle ==
Diesel engines are typically well suited to turbocharging due to two factors:

- A "lean" air–fuel ratio, caused when the turbocharger supplies excess air into the engine, is not a problem for diesel engines, because the torque control is dependent on the mass of fuel that is injected into the combustion chamber (i.e. air-fuel ratio), rather than the quantity of the air-fuel mixture.
- The additional quantity of air in the cylinder due to turbocharging effectively increases the compression ratio, which, in a petrol engine, can cause pre-ignition and high exhaust gas temperatures. However, in a diesel engine, fuel is not present in the combustion chamber during the compression stroke, since it is only added to the combustion chamber shortly before the piston reaches top dead center. Thus, no pre-ignition can occur.

As per turbocharged petrol engines, an intercooler can be used to cool the intake air and therefore increase its density.

== History ==
The turbocharger was invented in the early 20th century by Alfred Büchi, a Swiss engineer and the head of diesel engine research at the Gebrüder Sulzer engine manufacturing company. The turbocharger was originally intended to be used on diesel engines, since Büchi's patent of 1905 noted the efficiency improvements that a turbocharger could bring to diesel engines. However, the first production turbocharged engines to be manufactured did not occur until 1925, 10-cylinder turbo-diesel marine engines used by the German passenger ships Preussen and Hansestadt Danzig. The turbocharger increased the power output from 1,750 PS (1,287 kW) to 2,500 PS (1,839 kW). In 1925, Büchi invented sequential turbocharging, which according to Helmut Pucher (2012) marks the beginning of modern turbocharging technology.

By the late 1920s, several manufacturers were producing large turbo-diesels for marine and stationary use, such as Sulzer Bros., MAN, Daimler-Benz, and Paxman. Subsequent improvements in technology made feasible the use of turbochargers on smaller engines that ran at higher engine speeds, so turbo-diesel locomotive engines began appearing in the late 1940s. In 1951, MAN built the K6V 30/45 m.H.A., 1 MW prototype engine, which had, for its time, an exceptionally low fuel consumption of just 135.8 g/PSh (184.6 g/kWh), equivalent to an efficiency of 45.7 per cent. This was possible because of the advanced turbocharger design, comprising a five-stage axial compressor combined with a nine-stage radial compressor and an intercooler.

Use of turbo-diesel engines in road-going vehicles began with trucks in the early 1950s. The prototype MAN MK26 truck was unveiled in 1951, followed by the production model MAN 750TL1 turbo-diesel in 1954. The Volvo Titan Turbo truck was also introduced in 1954. By the late 1960s, demand for increasingly powerful truck engines led to turbo-diesels being produced by Cummins, Detroit Diesel, Scania AB, and Caterpillar Inc.

In 1952, the Cummins Diesel Special became the first turbocharged car to compete at the Indianapolis 500 motor race and qualified on pole position. The car was powered by a 6.6 L (403 cu in) inline-six engine producing 283 kW (380 hp).

Research into smaller turbo-diesel engines for passenger cars was undertaken by several companies through the 1960s and 1970s. Rover built a prototype 2.5 L four-cylinder turbo-diesel in 1963, and Mercedes-Benz used a five-cylinder intercooled turbo-diesel engine in the 1976 Mercedes-Benz C111-IID experimental vehicle.

The first turbo-diesel production car was the Mercedes-Benz 300SD (W116) saloon, which was sold in the United States from mid-1978 and powered by the OM617 five-cylinder engine. A year later, the Peugeot 604 D Turbo became the first turbo-diesel car to be sold in Europe. Turbo-diesel cars began to be widely built and sold in Europe during the late 1980s and early 1990s, a trend that has continued to the present day.

Since the 1990s, the compression ratio of turbo-diesel engines has been dropping, due to better specific power and better exhaust-emission behaviour of turbocharged engines with a lower compression ratio. Indirect injected engines used to have compression ratios of 18.5 or higher. Following the introduction of common rail engines in the late 1990s, compression ratios decreased to the range of 16.5 to 18.5. Some diesel engines built since 2016 to comply with the Euro 6 exhaust emissions regulations have a compression ratio of 14.0.

== Characteristics ==
Turbocharging can greatly increase the power output of a diesel engine, bringing the peak power-to-weight ratio closer to that of an equivalent petrol engine.

Improvements in power, fuel economy, and noise, vibration, and harshness in both small and large-capacity turbodiesels over the last decade have spurred their widespread adoption in certain markets, notably in Europe where they (as of 2014) make up over 50% of new car registrations. Turbodiesels are generally considered more flexible for automotive uses than naturally aspirated diesel engines. Turbodiesels can be designed to have a more acceptable spread of torque over their speed range or, if being built for commercial use, can be designed to improve torque output at a given speed depending on the exact use. Naturally aspirated diesel engines, almost without exception, have a lower power output than a petrol engine of the same capacity whilst the same time requiring stronger (and thus heavier) internal components such as the pistons and crankshaft to withstand the greater stresses of the diesel engine's much higher compression ratio. These factors give naturally aspirated diesels a poor power-to-weight ratio. Turbocharger units weigh very little but can offer significant power, torque, and efficiency improvements. Fitting a turbocharger can bring a diesel engine's power-to-weight ratio up to the same level as an equivalent petrol unit, making turbodiesels desirable for automotive use, where manufacturers aim for comparable power outputs and handling qualities across their range, regardless of the type of power unit chosen.

== See also ==
- Injection pump
- Turbocharged petrol engines
- Variable geometry turbocharger
