= FM7 =

FM7 may refer to:

- FM-7, a home computer by Fujitsu
- Farm to Market Road 7
- Minor seventh chord in the key of F
- Volvo FM7, a heavy truck
- Forza Motorsport 7, a video game
- The virtual instrument plug-in by Native Instruments
