= Volvo FMX =

Motor vehicle

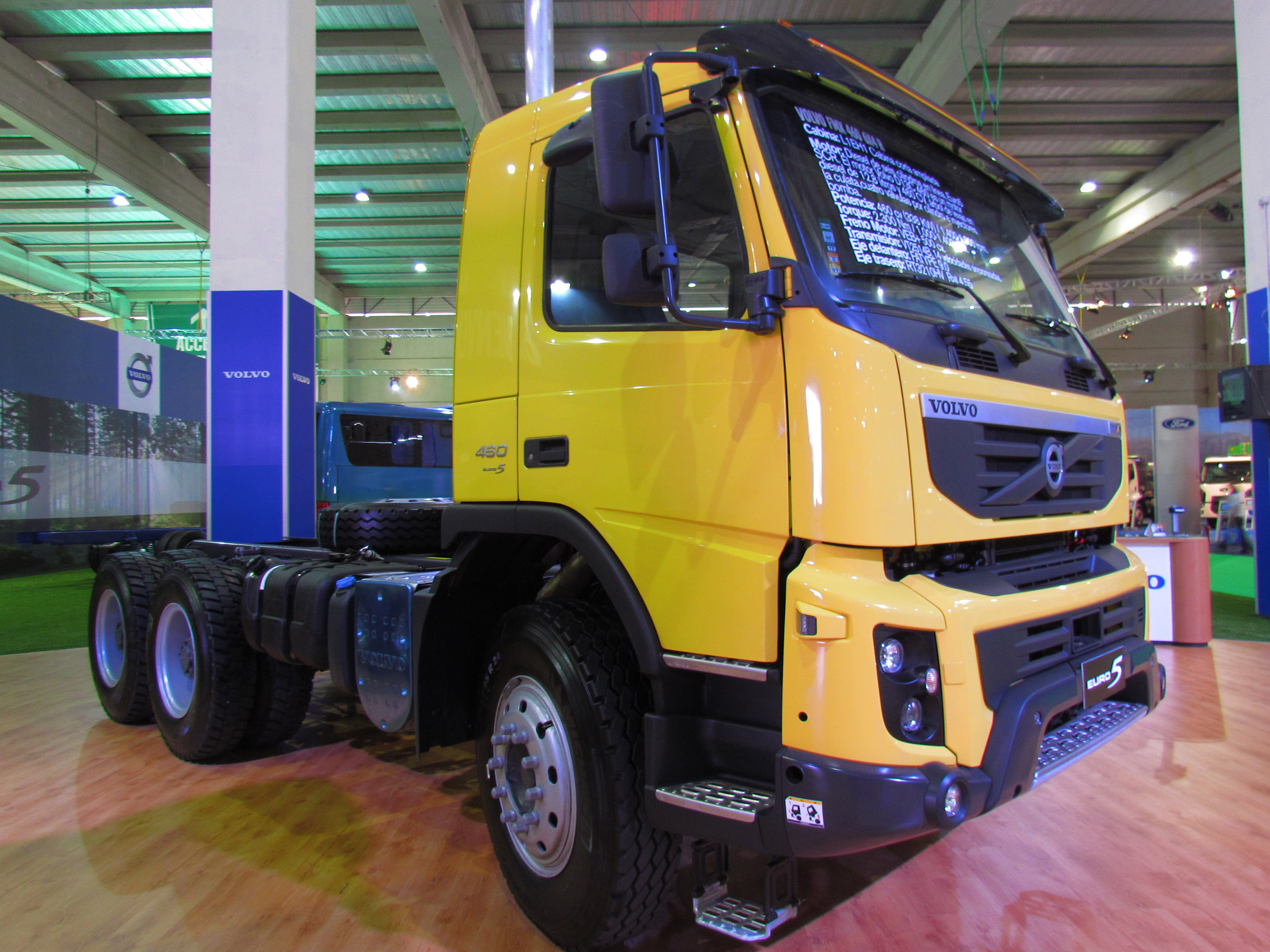
- Volvo FMX 460

Overview
- Manufacturer: Volvo Trucks Corporation
- Production: 2010–present
- Assembly: Sweden: Gothenburg; Iran: Tehran (Saipa Diesel); Belgium: Ghent; Australia: Brisbane; Russia: Kaluga; South Africa: Durban; India: Bangalore; Brazil: Curitiba; Egypt: Cairo

Body and chassis
- Class: Heavy truck
- Body style: COE: Day cab; Sleeper cab; Globetrotter High cab
- Related: FM

Powertrain
- Engine: Inline 6-cylinder turbo-charged & intercooled Volvo D13 truck (12.7 L)
- Transmission: Truck manual

The Volvo FMX (FMX meaning "Forward control Medium Xtreme") is a heavy-duty truck produced by Volvo Truck Corporation. It was introduced in 2010. Based on the standard Volvo FM which is related, the FMX range is a multipurpose truck range for distribution, construction and on highway/off highway transport duties. As of 2011 the engine size is no longer added to the model denomination. The refreshed model based on the first-generation FMX introduced in 2013 and then the second generation, which is a completely makeover, from 27 February 2020.

== First generation (2010–2020) ==
Original
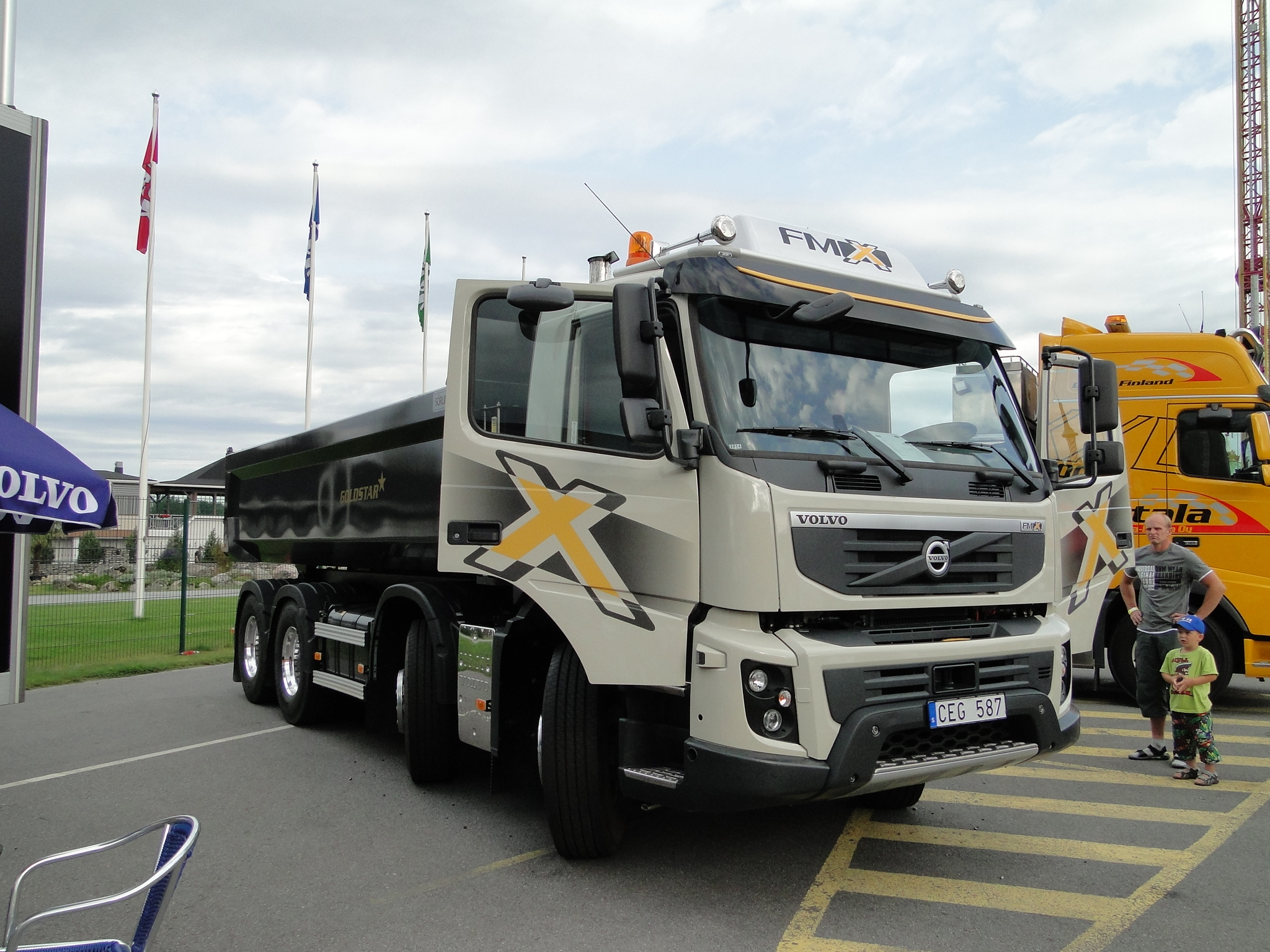

Overview
- Production: 2010–2020
- Designer: Volvo Truck Design Center

Body and chassis
- Related: FH; FM

Powertrain
- Engine: Volvo D11-litre, Volvo D13-litre (Euro 5)

The original first-generation FMX was introduced in 2010 and shared its platform and components with the FM. All FMX have been available with the choice of 11-litre and 13-litre Euro-5 engines, The D11 and D13 models. The production version went on sale in Europe in autumn 2010 and worldwide in 2011.

=== Facelift ===
Facelift
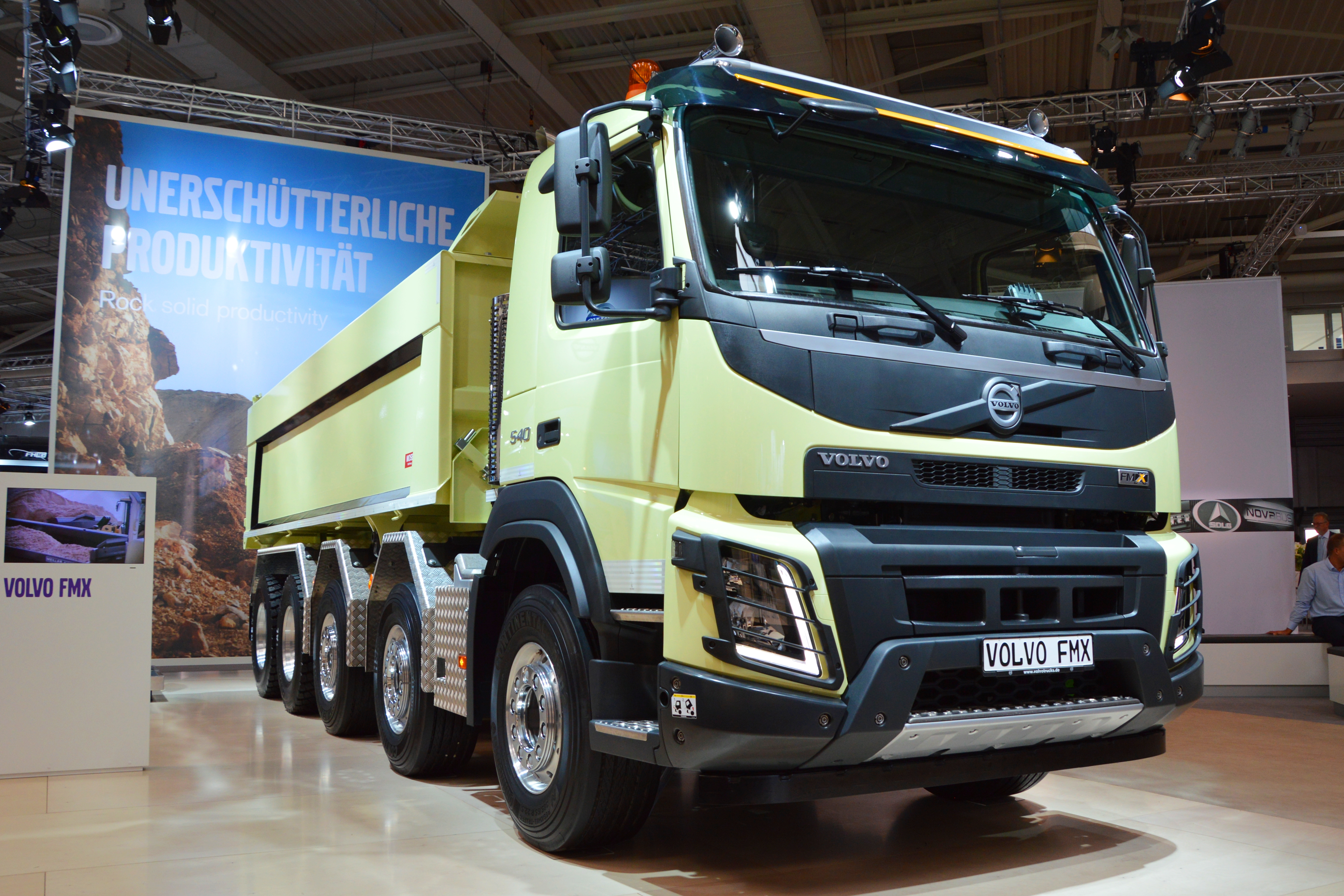

Overview
- Production: 2013–2020
- Designer: Volvo Truck Design Center

Body and chassis
- Layout: Front-engine 4x2, 4x4, 6x2, 6x4, 6x6, 8x2, 8x4, 8x6 10x4, 10x8
- Related: FH; FM

Powertrain
- Engine: Volvo D11C; Volvo D13C
- Transmission: 9 speed manual 14 speed manual 6 speed automatic (powertronic); 12 speed automatic (ishift)

The facelift version based on the FMX was unveiled in April 2013, with sales began in September 2013. It features a darken halogen HID headlights borrowed from the some base equipment of the FH16, a refreshed grille, and a redesigned dashboard with a choice of two digital dials and two analogue gauges, as well as a new steering wheel and an infotainment system. It also comes standard with the Volvo Dynamic Steering System. It is available with a choice of carry-over engines with Euro-VI.

== Second generation (since 2020) ==
Unveiled on 27 February 2020, the second-generation FMX which is a rugged only, compared to the standard FM. It is the first new models launched under the brand's recently President Roger Alm.

Some of the equipment features include a darken halogen LED headlights, a steel-and-polypropylene bumper, an energy-absorbing box construction a 3 mm skid plate. It also retains a new-generation steering wheel, a fully digital instrument cluster, and a large touchscreen infotainment system.

The second-generation FMX finally began sales later in 2020.
