= Saipa Diesel =

Iranian manufacturing company

SAIPA Diesel
- Type: Public limited company
- Industry: Manufacturing
- Founded: 1963; 63 years ago
- Headquarters: Tehran, Iran
- Area served: Worldwide
- Products: Heavy commercial vehicles, medium commercial vehicles, light commercial vehicles, quarry/construction site vehicles, special vehicles, city and intercity buses, firefighting vehicles, defence vehicles
- Parent: SAIPA
- Website: www.saipadiesel.ir www.saipadiesel.com

SAIPA Diesel Company, originally branded Iran Kaveh, is an Iranian-based manufacturer of trucks and trailers.

== Beginnings ==
The company began operations in 1963 under an exclusive agreement with Mack Trucks to assemble their trucks and various types of trailers. By 1978, the factory was producing a total of 7,512 units.

== Since 2000 ==
=== Environmental standards ===
Beginning in 2000, Iranian truck fleets running on international roads were being stopped at European frontiers due to their non-conformity to European environmental standards. SAIPA Diesel committed itself to helping international transportation companies out of their plight by introducing Volvo FH12 and NH12 trucks.

=== Updating technology ===
SAIPA Diesel has also taken on the responsibility of updating the Iranian truck fleets.

=== Present & future ===
At present, SAIPA Diesel's annual production capacity is 20,000 units of different types of trucks and 6,000 units of various types of trailers and truck bodies. Several actions have contributed to the company's current position.

- Investment and development of production and technology sections.
- Expanding subsidiary companies.
- Renovation of the domestic transportation fleets.
- Establishment of an Integrated Workplace Management System.
- Introducing state-of-the-art midibuses and minibuses.

== Products ==
=== Truck ===
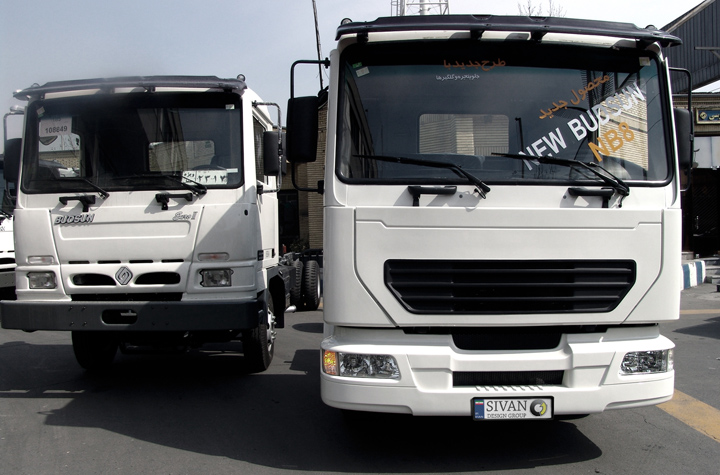
SAIPA Diesel New Budsun NB8(right) vs. SAIPA Diesel Budsun(left) designed by Sivan design group

- Volvo FH
- Volvo FM
- Volvo FMX
- Dongfeng Tianlong
- Budsun NB8
- Budsun
- Renault Midlum
- Foton
- Renault D WIDE 6X2
- Dongfeng KX480
- Mack R Model

=== Minibus ===
- Mahsun T18, Y21

=== Superstructures ===
- Tripper
- Firefighting
- Garbage Compactor
- Mixer
- Crane

=== Previous ===
- Renault R
- Renault B
- Renault FR1
- Renault PR100
- Renault R312

== See also ==
- SAIPA
- Iranian cars
