= Volvo FM =

Volvo FM series
- Volvo FM (Third Generation)

Overview
- Manufacturer: Volvo Trucks Corporation
- Also called: AMW GenNext Trucks (India)
- Production: 1998–present
- Assembly: Sweden: Gothenburg; Iran: Tehran (Saipa Diesel); Australia: Brisbane; Belgium: Ghent; Brazil: Curitiba; Egypt: Cairo (Ghabbour Group); India: Bangalore; Philippines: Manila (Volvo Philippines); Russia: Kaluga (Kaluga Truck Plant); South Africa: Durban (GTO Durban Plant); Thailand: Samut Prakan (TSA)

Body and chassis
- Class: Heavy truck
- Body style: COE: Day cab; Sleeper cab; Globetrotter High cab
- Related: Volvo FH; Volvo FMX

Powertrain
- Engine: Inline 6-cylinder turbo-charged & intercooled: Volvo engines; D7C (7.3 L)1998–2001; D10B (9.6 L)1998–2001; D9A,B (9.4 L)2002-present; D12C,D (12.1 L)1998–2005; D13A,B (12.7 L)2005-present
- Transmission: 14 speed synchro manual; SR1900 (1998–2001); VT2014 (1998–2001); VT2514 (OD); VT2214AGS(1998–2002); 12 speed semi-auto I-Shift; V2412AT (2001-present); V2512AT (2005-present); 6-speed auto Powertronic; VT1605PT; VT1706PT; VT1906 PT; VT2206PT; V2006PT & V2506PT

Chronology
- Predecessor: FL7/FL10/FL12 series

The Volvo FM is a heavy truck range produced by the Swedish company Volvo Trucks. It was originally introduced as FM7, FM10 and FM12 in 1998. FM stands for forward control medium height cab, where the numbers denominate an engine capacity in litres. As of 2005 the engine size is no longer added to the model denomination. The FM range is a multipurpose truck range for distribution, construction and on highway/off highway transport duties. In 2013, Volvo Trucks announced an updated, Euro VI version of the Volvo FM.

== Introduction ==
The FM introduction continued to build on successful line of F7, FL7 and FL10 trucks and it was also a part of Volvo Trucks Corporation planning strategy for "The Global Family Of Trucks" where FM would be complementing FH and NH/VN truck range. Released in conjunction with face-lifted FH range the FM7,10,12 included Volvo electronic architecture and upgraded D12 engine whilst carrying over the older D7 and D10 engines which traced their origins to the early push-rods TD70 and TD100 power plants but with modern electronic controls implants to increase power outputs and improve fuel efficiency and emissions.

== Design and technology ==
The FM range is closely related to the FH range where models share the numbers of components further decreasing production and development costs while improving built efficiency and quality of the products. In principle the FM and the FH and to a degree the NH cabs have a same layout with driver and passenger area, dashboard and seats as the common feature. The lower position of FM cabs is the primary difference between the FM and FH ranges.

== First generation (1998–2001) ==
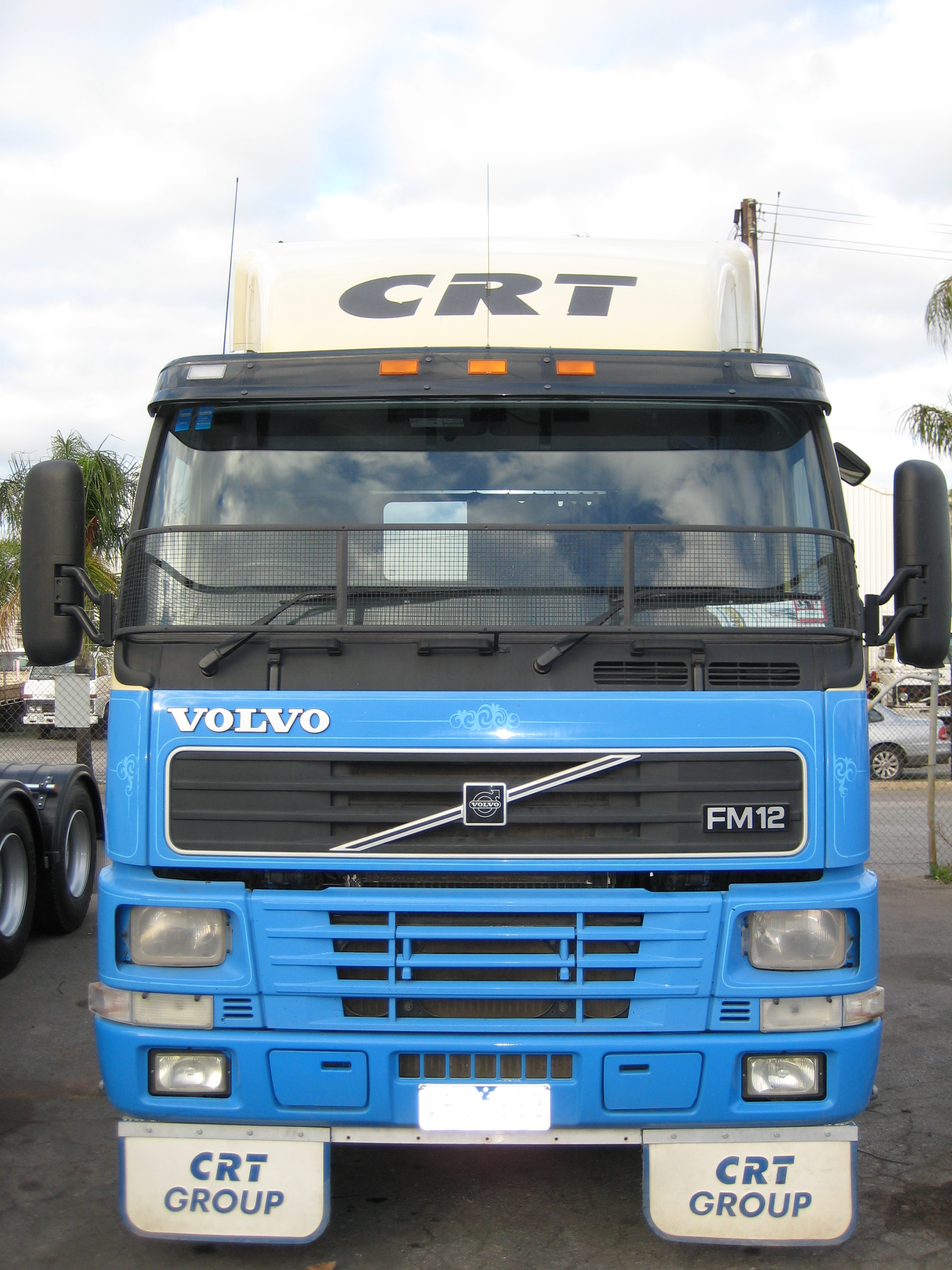
FM12 first generation

=== Cabs ===
What appeared to be scaled down FH cabs were initially available in three basic sizes, short day cab, sleeper cab, and globetrotter cab. Various trims and color option were available. Electric cab tilt was an option.

=== Electric and electronics ===
The electrical and electronic system shared with the FH series was based on electronic control units and data bus technology. The communication among the different control units run via two data links SAE J1939 and SAE J1708 allowed possibility of diagnostics, analysis and follow up of the vehicle's system via instrument cluster display.

=== Engines ===
The engines power rating span from 250 PS (184 kW) to 420 PS (309 kW) in the initial release.

- D7A -> 203 PS (149 kW)
- D7C -> 250–290 PS (184–213 kW)
- D10B -> 320–360 PS (235–265 kW)
- D12C -> 380–420 PS (279–309 kW)

D7C is a further development of D7 generation of engines, however major difference between the latter is the increase of engine capacity from 6.7 litres to 7.3 litres due to an increase in stroke and cylinder diameter. Engine management EDC also received the upgrade to bring it inline with the rest of the "family" and be TEA 98 compliant. Introduction of D12C engine had created all new beast in its class thanks to its extra power and powerful engine brake which were only available previously in the FH class saw operators with an option of smaller cab but still capable long haul unit particularly with globetrotter cab and indeed FM12 did steal some sales from its bigger brother the FH12.

=== Driveline ===
The FM7, FM10 and FM12 were available in variety of configurations with manual and automatic transmissions as 4x2 and 6x4 tractor and rigid, 8x2 and 8x4 rigid and 6x6 special construction models with hub reductions or single final drives.

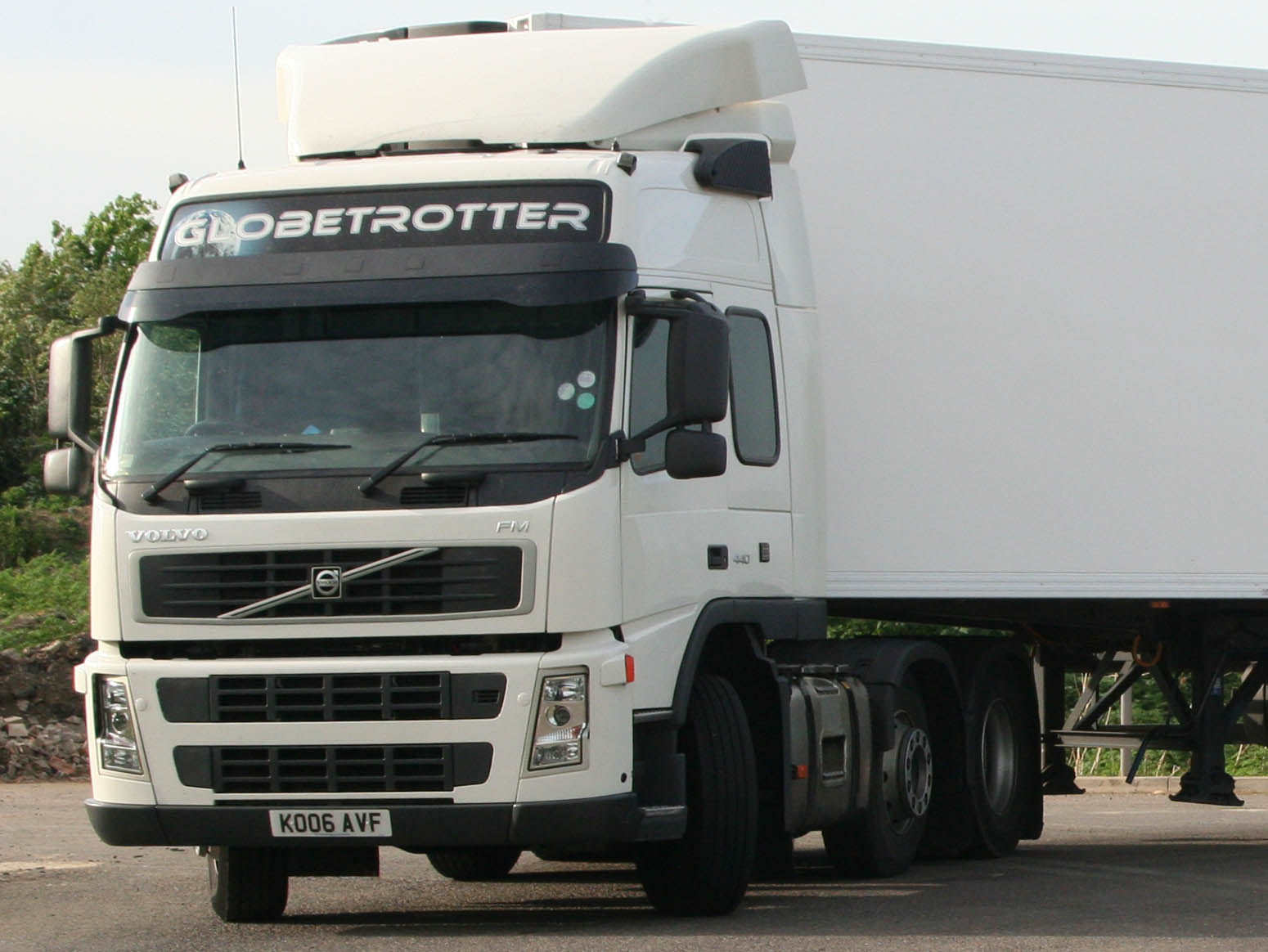
Volvo FM with Globetrotter cab

== Second generation (2001–2020) ==
In 2001 FM series underwent major revision in conjunction with FH series. Among changes resulted were 7- and 10-litre engines being dropped and replaced by an all-new 9-litre D9A engine and introduction of a new automated gear-change transmission I-Shift and new passive safety feature FUPS (front underrun protection system), designed to prevent smaller vehicles from being "under run" or wedged under front of the truck in an event of frontal collision.

=== Engine and transmission ===
The new D9A engine developed on the basis of D12 with single overhead camshaft and four valves per cylinder and electronic unit injectors followed with a new design feature for Volvo, timing gears at the flywheel side (rear) of the engine, design which will later become standard across entire Volvo truck engine range. D9A power output varies from 300–380 PS (221–279 kW) and torque of 1400-1700 Nm respectively. Introduction of I-Shift was the end for the Geartronic (AGS) and its shortcomings, however the I-Shift was designed to be what it was, whereas the Geartronic was a modification to an existing manual transmission. In 2003, the FM12 with 460 PS (338 kW) D12D was launched as a new version of the Powertronic automatic transmission.

=== 2005 upgrade ===
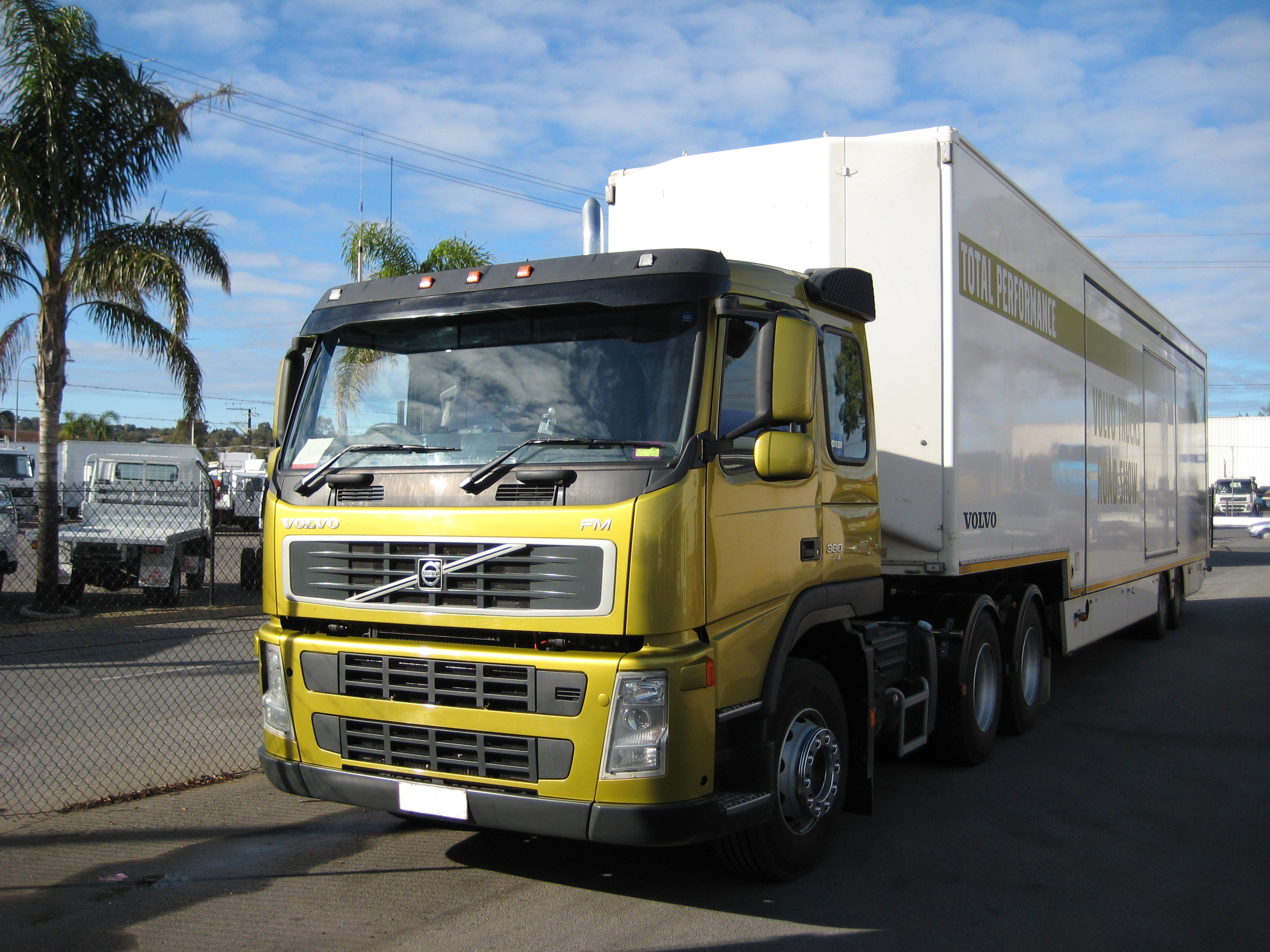
Volvo FM with 6X4

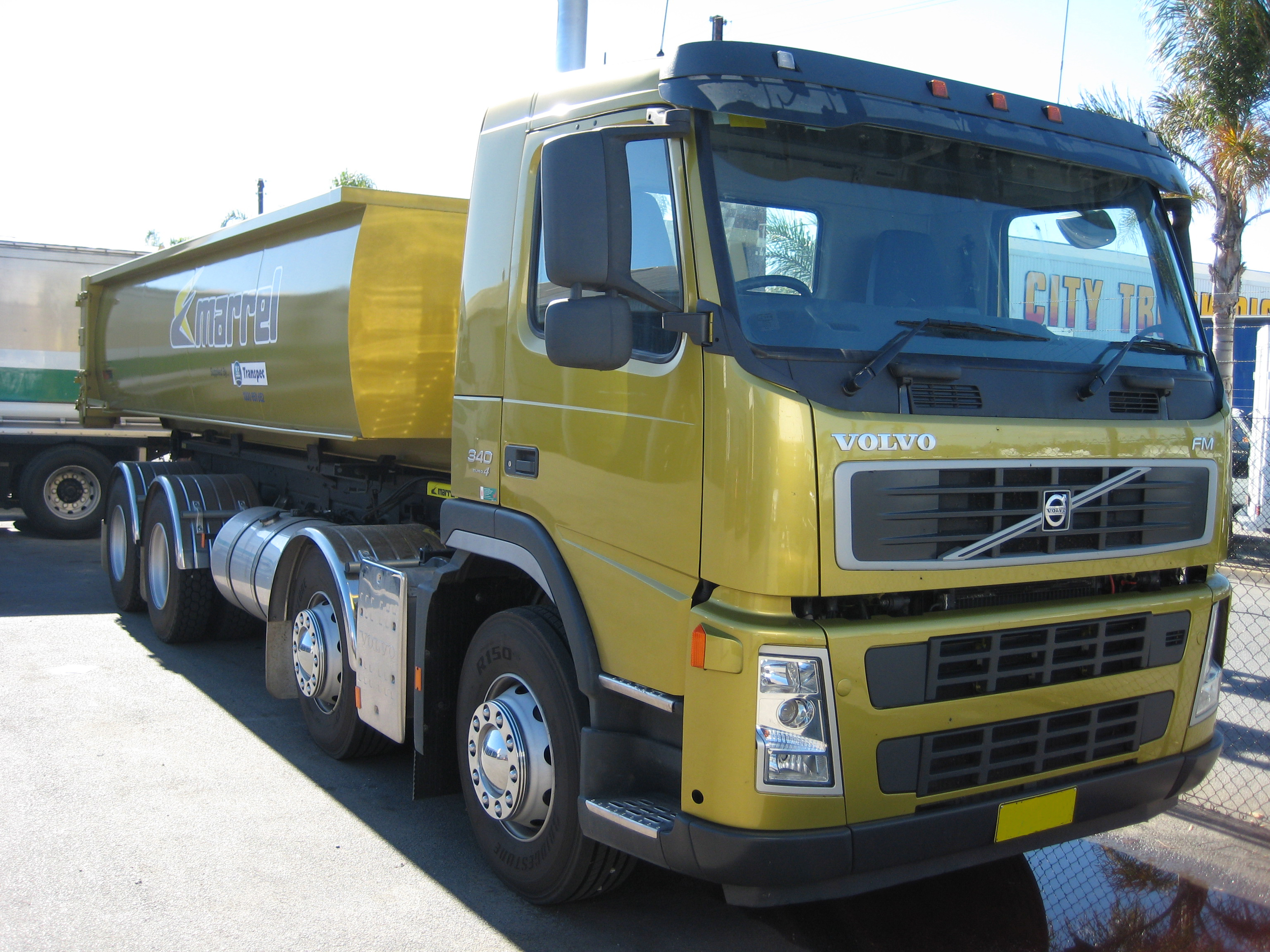
FM 8x4

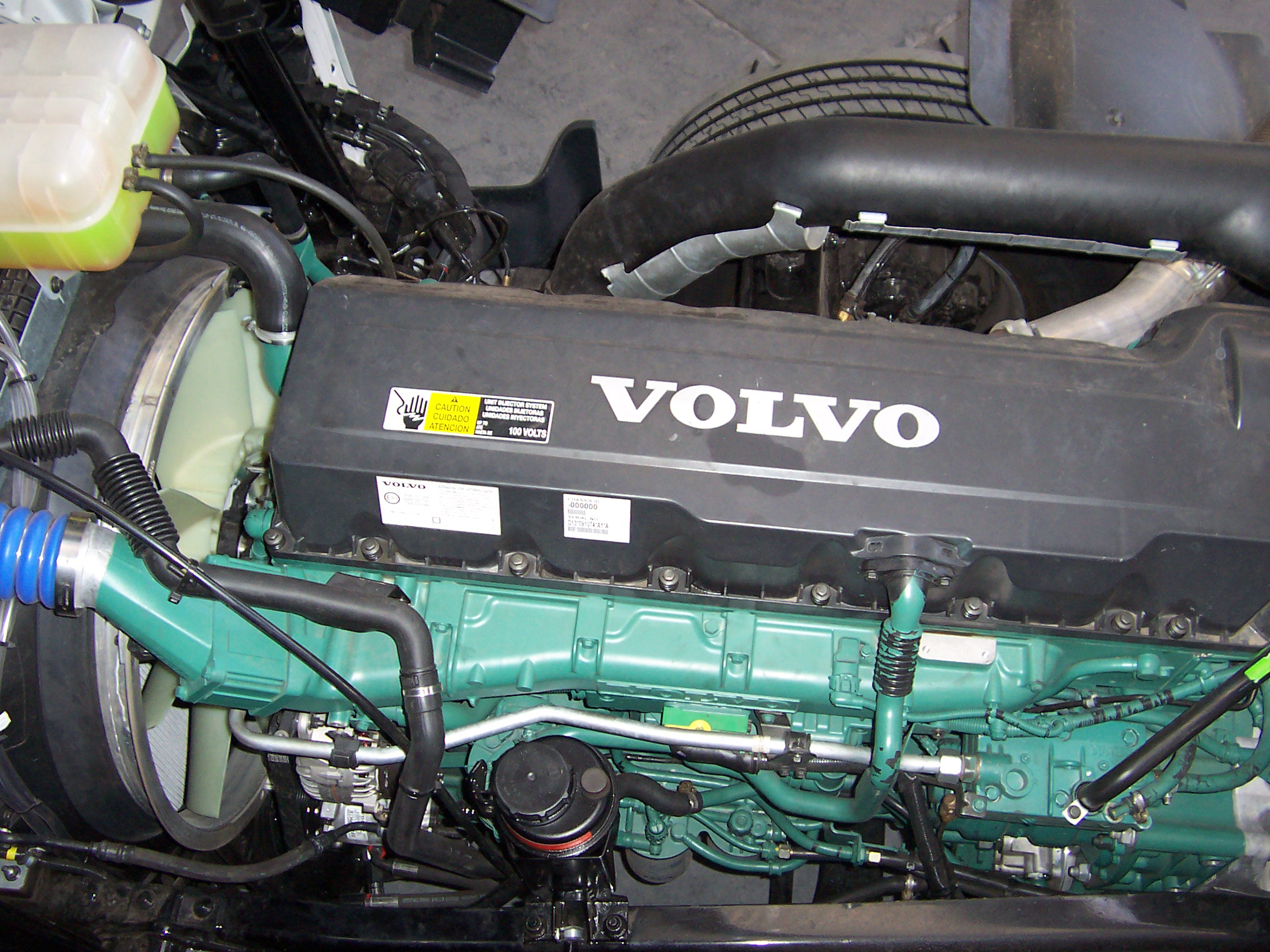
D13A engine

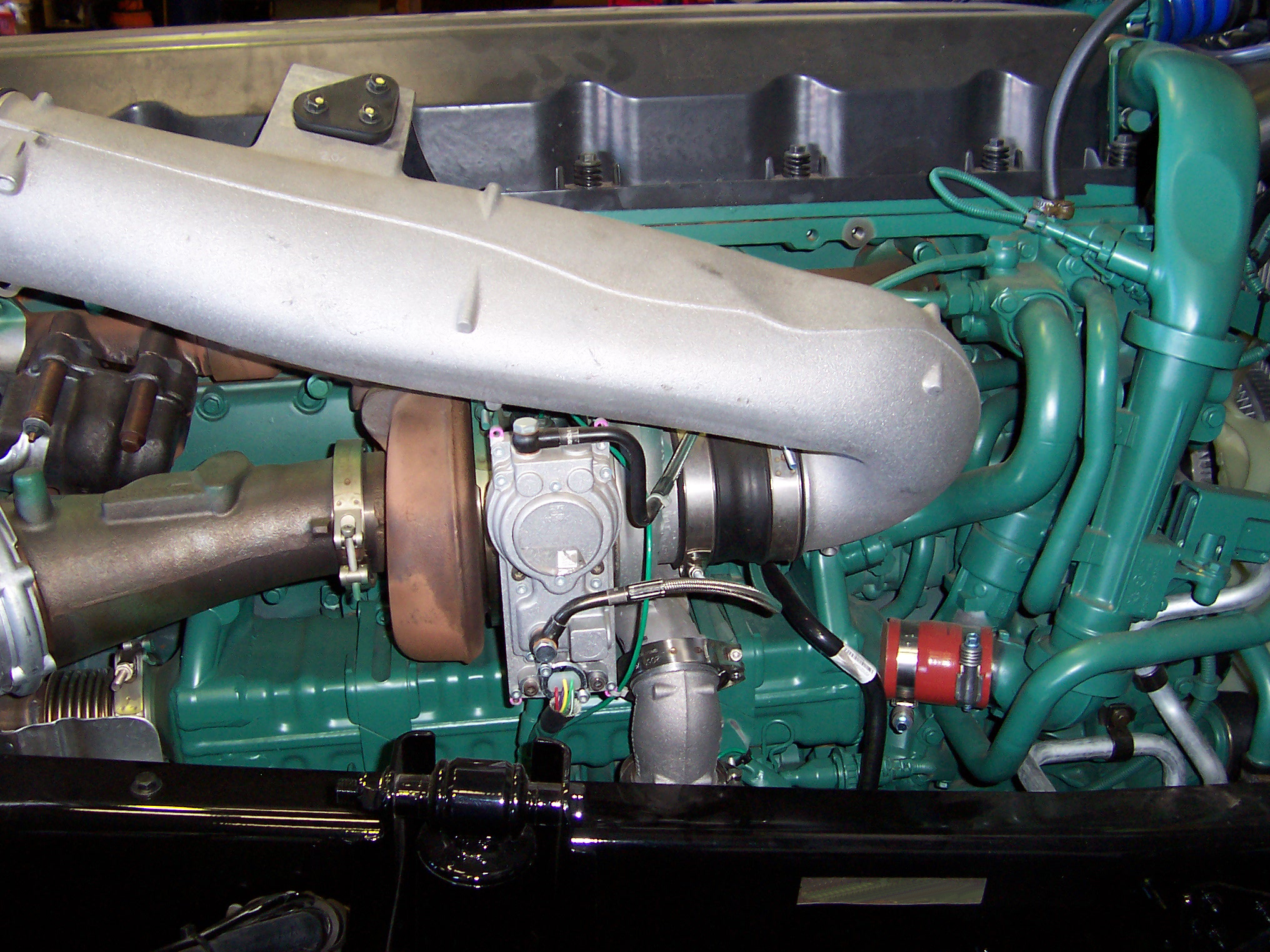
D13B engine

The evolution of Volvo FM series continued in 2005 with the release of a new generation of FM trucks powered by an all-new 13-litre D13A engine and improved 9-litre D9B unit and the second-generation I-Shift transmission. The naming of the series had also changed: engine size in litres is no longer used in the FM name. The new engines were available in Euro IV emissions standard in both Selective Catalytic Reduction. Volvo had also introduced on D13A engine with SCR an improved version of its engine compression brake the "VEB+" featuring additional helper rocker arm and fourth cam lobe per cylinder. Power outputs available from 360 PS (265 kW), 400 PS (294 kW), 440 PS (324 kW) and 480 PS (353 kW). In 2007 Volvo introduced D13B with Exhaust Gas Recirculation configuration and VGT turbocharger but without exhaust particle filter and is the only manufacturer to offer this solution thus far. The engines are available in slightly reduced power output ranging from 360 PS (265 kW), 400 PS (294 kW), 440 PS (324 kW) and 500 PS (368 kW) however 500 PS (368 kW) option is only available for FH series.

Volvo Truck Corporation had announced a new version of an engine the D11B available in two power outputs 390 PS (287 kW) and 430 PS (316 kW) as well as new safety features such as Driver Alert Support monitor, Electronic Stability Program (ESP), Lane Changing Support, Cornering lights and Rain detection windscreen wipers.

=== Facelifts ===
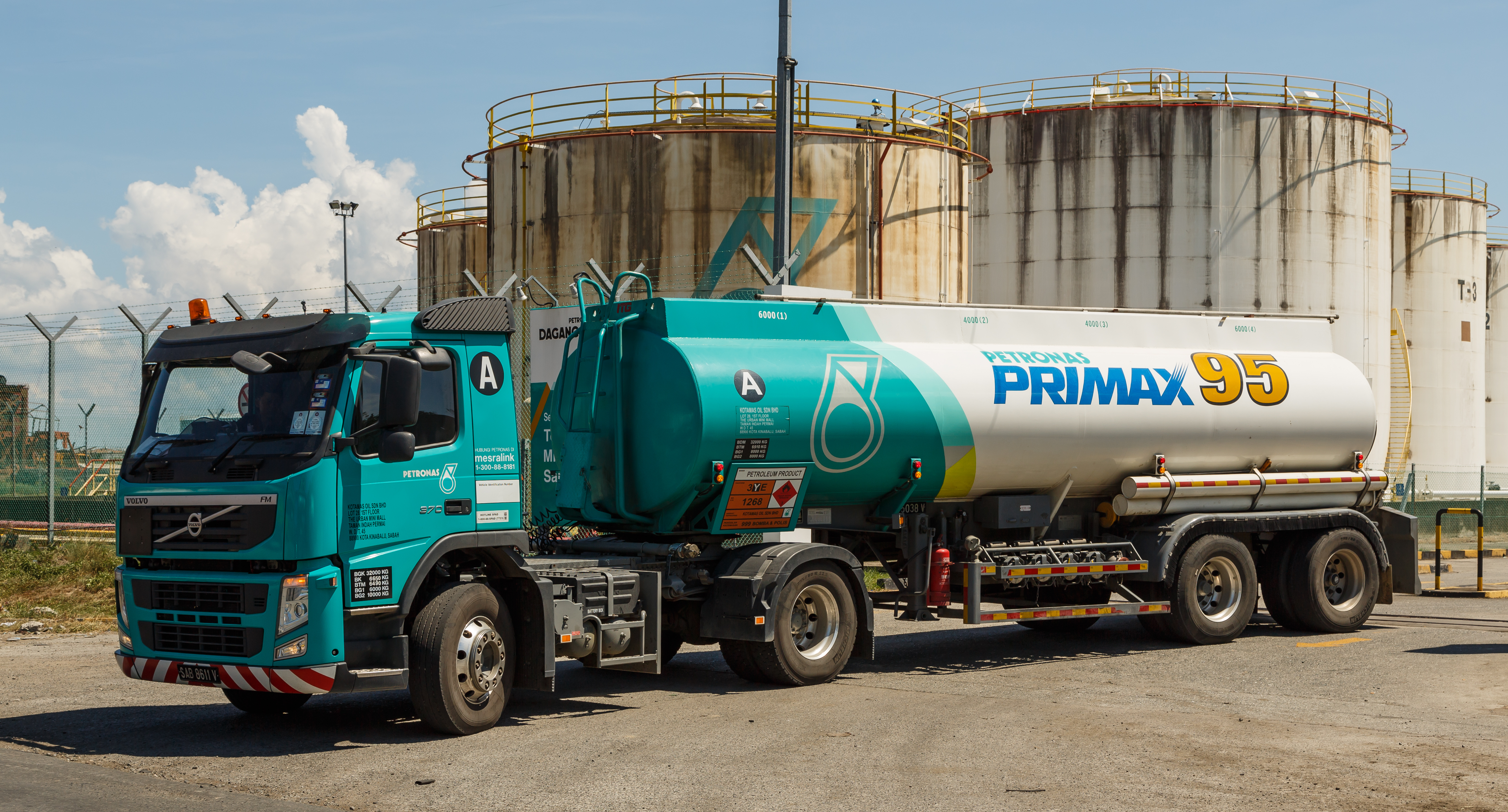
Volvo FM Petronas tanker truck at Sandakan port, Malaysia.

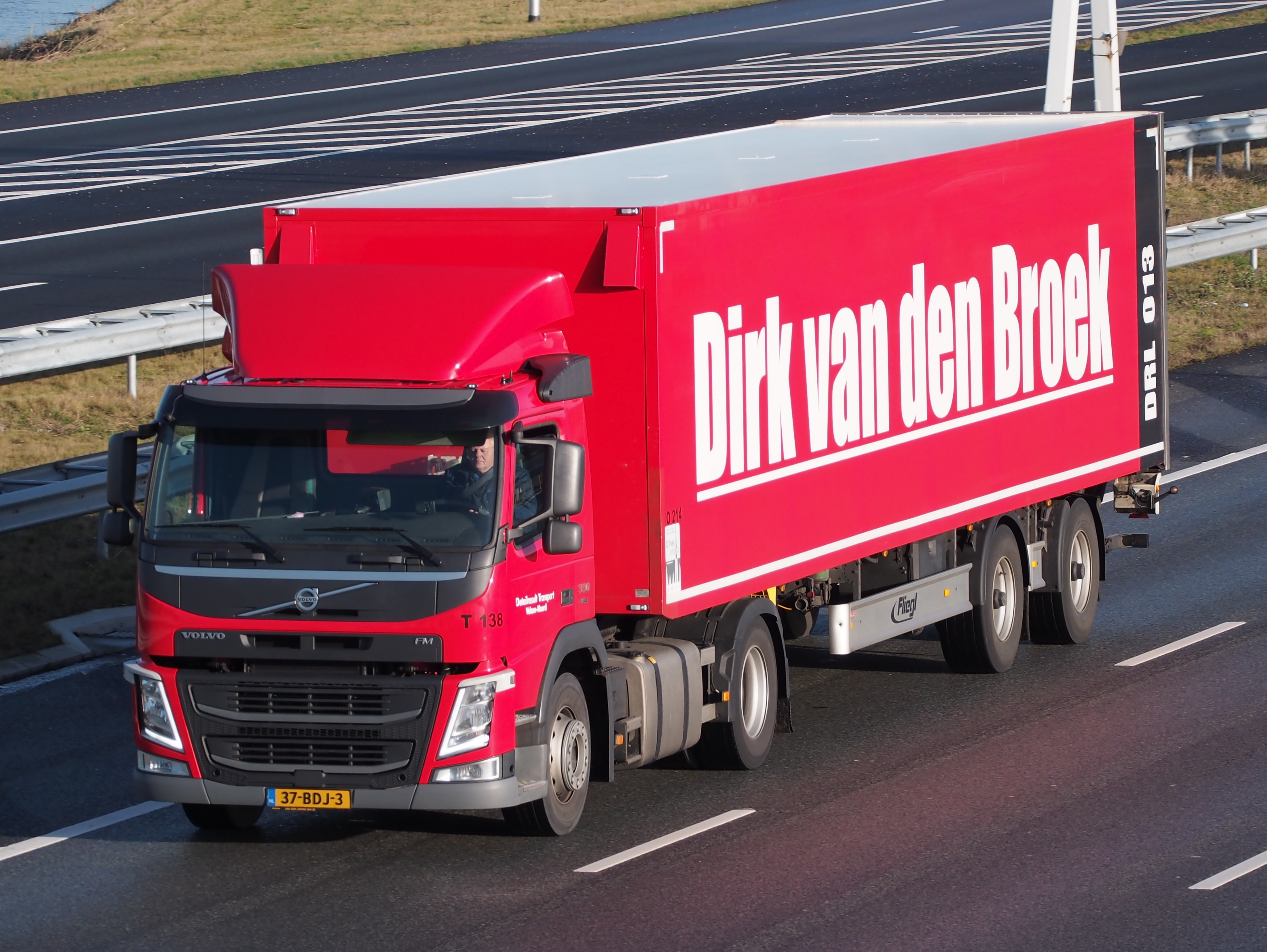
Volvo FM day cab on the A4 near Hoofddorp, the Netherlands.

In 2010, Volvo released the completely facelifted FM. The facelift which adds the new styling and added engines. It was the first time fitted with LED daytime running lights. Also, Volvo launched its related to the FM, the FMX.

The facelift version based on the FM was unveiled on 19 March 2013, and made its first public appearance was in April at the 2013 Commercial Vehicle Show in the UK. It also comes standard with the Volvo Dynamic Steering System. It features a choice of two headlights (a halogen HID and a projector HID) both borrowed from the current generation FH. It also adopts a refreshed grille, and the redesigned dashboard with a choice of two digital dials and two analogue gauges, as well as a new steering wheel and an infotainment system. It is available with a choice of carry-over engines with Euro-VI. Sales began in September 2013. As of 2020, the previous facelift model continues to be offered in selected markets when the third generation FM unveiled, now marketed as Volvo FM Classic.

In 2017 Volvo introduced FM440 and FH520 ballast tractors with company fitted ballast box as per the new Automotive Research Association of India regulations to register N3 category vehicles with ballast weights to tow hydraulic modular trailers for oversize load transport only Volvo and Scania provided heavy-duty tractors with company fitted ballast box.

== Third generation (2020–present) ==
Third generation
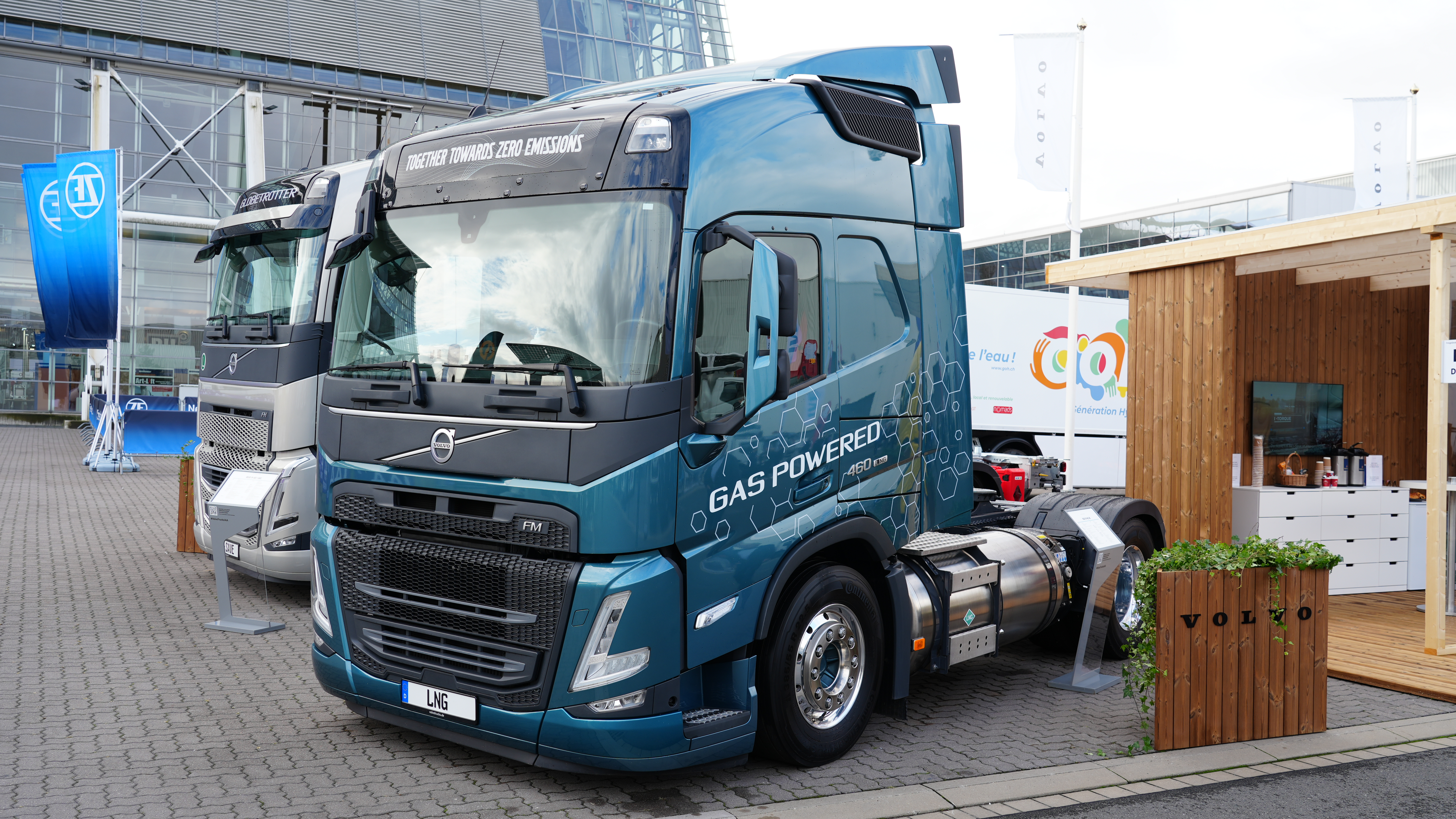
- 2022 Volvo FM 460

Overview
- Production: 2020-present; 2021-present (India)

Powertrain
- Battery: 540 kW (734 PS; 724 hp) (FM Electric)
- Electric range: 450 km (280 mi) (FM Electric)

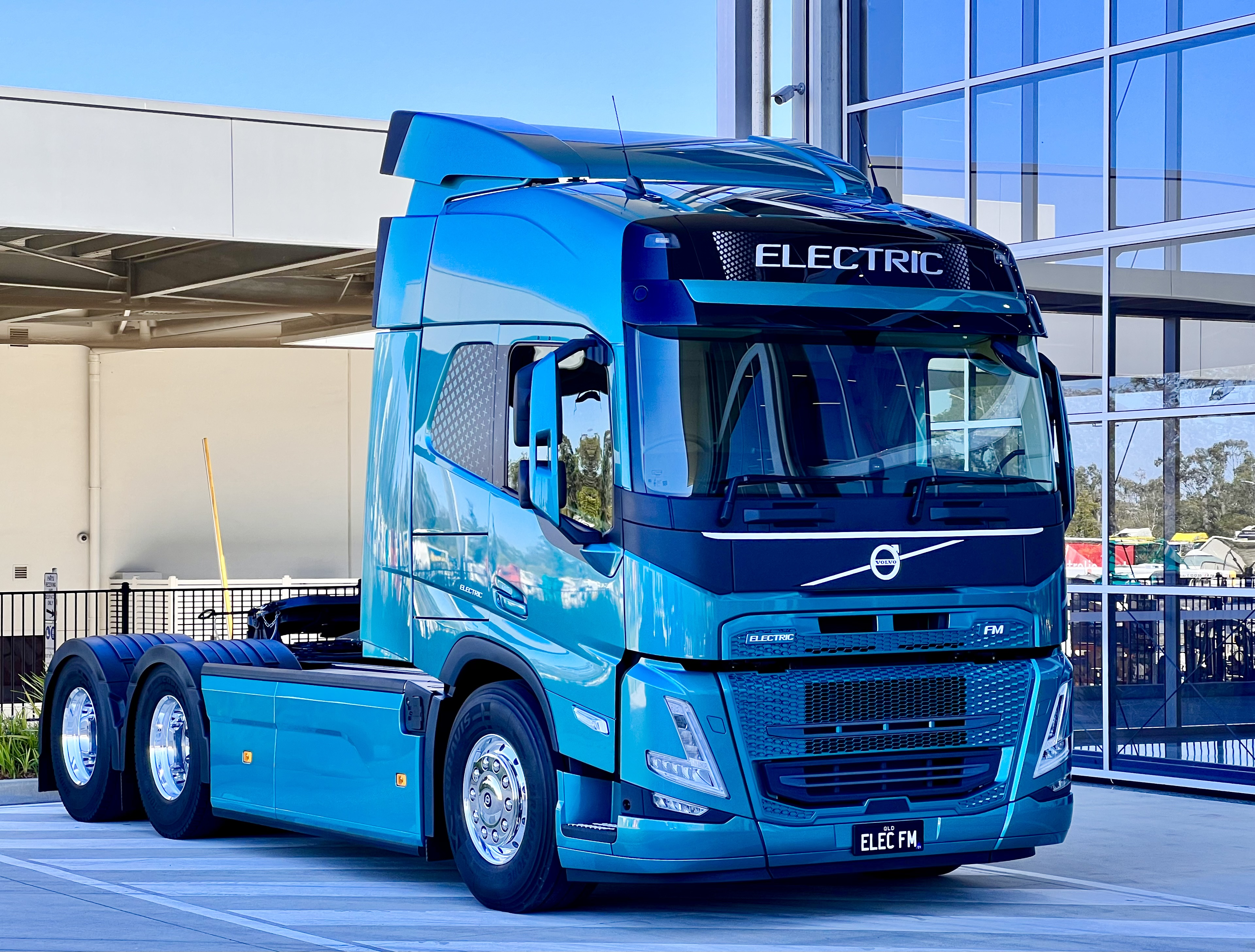
2023 FM Electric (Australia)

The third generation FM, which made its debut on 27 February 2020. It is the first new models launched under the brand's recently President, Roger Alm. It is available in each configuration, including a Globetrotter high roof version.

The third generation FM features a new LED headlights, combined with halogen and projector units borrowed from the refreshed FH. It also retains a new generation steering wheel, a fully-digital instrument cluster, and a large touchscreen infotainment system.

There is an electric version that has a range of 450 km (280 mi), that is sold along with the new FH electric. The EV version has a more closed-up grille compared to the conventional internal combustion version.

In India, new generations of the FM trucks were launched in 2021 with FM and FMX line up. FMX available in off road and on road tipper trucks and FM available in tractor as FM420 4x2 and FM500 Puller 6x4 as ballast tractor, replacing the outgoing FH520 Puller 6x4 in the nation.

=== Safety ===
Euro NCAP test results Volvo FM 4x2 Tractor Unit (2024)
| Test | Score |
|---|---|
| Overall: | 5 /5 stars |
| Safe driving | 90% |
| Crash avoidance | 89% |
| Post crash | 80% |

Euro NCAP test results Volvo FM 6x2 Rigid (2025)
| Test | Score |
|---|---|
| Overall: | 5 /5 stars |
| Safe driving | 90% |
| Crash avoidance | 85% |
| Post crash | 80% |

Euro NCAP test results Volvo FM 4x2 Rigid (2026)
| Test | Score |
|---|---|
| Overall: | 5 /5 stars |
| Safe driving | 89% |
| Crash avoidance | 86% |
| Post crash | 80% |

== Marketing ==
In November 2013, Volvo released the "Epic Split" viral advertisement on YouTube to promote the FM's dynamic steering system. In the video, Jean-Claude Van Damme performs his splits while standing on the side mirrors of two FMs running in reverse.
