= Volvo FH =

Volvo FH Series
- 2024 Volvo FH16 780

Overview
- Manufacturer: Volvo Trucks
- Also called: Volvo FH Bitren (Argentina, until 2021); Volvo FH13 (Philippines); Volvo FH12; Volvo FH16
- Production: 1993–present
- Assembly: Sweden: Gothenburg; Iran: Tehran (Saipa Diesel); Australia: Wacol; Belgium: Ghent; Brazil: Curitiba; Egypt: Cairo (Ghabbour Group); India: Bangalore; Russia: Kaluga; South Africa: Durban; Indonesia: Jakarta; Philippines: Quezon City; Malaysia: Kuala Lumpur; Japan: Fukushima (UD Trucks); Thailand: Samut Prakan (TSA)

Body and chassis
- Class: Heavy truck
- Body style: COE: Sleeper; Globetrotter; Globetrotter XL; Globetrotter XXL

Powertrain
- Engine: Inline 6 turbodiesel intercooled: Volvo; D12A (12.1 L) 420 309kW (1993–1998); D12C (12.1 L) 420 309kW, 460 340kW (1998–2001); D12D (12.1 L) 420 309kW, 460 340kW (2001–2005); D12F (12,1 L) 420 309kW, 460 340kW (2004–2006; EGR); D13A, B, C (12.7 L) (2005–present); D13K (12.9 L) (2012–present); D16A, B (16.1 L) (1993–2001); D16C, E, G (16.1 L) (2006–present); D16K (16.1 L) (2015–present); D17A (17.3 L) (2024–present); Cummins; ISX600 (14.91 L) (1998–2006; Australia)
- Transmission: 14 speed synchro-manual; SR1900 (1993–1998); SR(O)2400 (1993–1998); VT2514(OD) (1998–present); VT2814(OD) (2006–present); VT(O)2214B (2012–present); VT(O)2514B (2012–present); VT(O)2814B (2012–present); 16 speed synchro-manual (ZF); ZT1816; 12 speed automated manual (I-Shift); V2512AT (2007–present); V(O)2812AT (2007–present); VO3112AT (2008–present); AT2412D (2012–present); AT(O)2612D (2012–present); AT2812D (2012–present); SPO2812 Dual clutch (2016–present); ATO3112D (2012–present); ATO3512D (2012–present); ATO3812G (2024–present); 6 speed automatic (Powertronic); VT1706PT; VT1906PT

Chronology
- Predecessor: Volvo F series

The Volvo FH is a heavy truck range manufactured by the Swedish company Volvo Trucks. It was originally introduced in late 1993 as the FH12 and FH16. FH stands for forward control high entry, where numbers denominate engine capacity in litres. The FH range is one of the most successful truck series ever having sold more than 400,000 units worldwide.

In September 2012, Volvo Trucks re-launched the Volvo FH with significant technology upgrades.

== History ==
On September 1, 1993, Volvo unveiled its replacement for the F cabover series, which had been in production for almost 15 years. The development of the Volvo FH took seven years. The development of the all-new 12-litre engine with its overhead camshaft and electronic unit injector technology placed Volvo among the world's leading engine designers.

The launch of the FH12 and FH16 marked the concomitant beginning of Volvo's new Global programme. One expressed goal of the FH and its new engine was moving towards the meeting of the Euro 6 Emission Standard. It is believed that one feature that set the FH apart from the competition at launch was the comfort; the FH met the standards of the time for engine power and wheel layouts, and paired with a level of comfort still appreciated today.

== First generation (1993–2002) ==
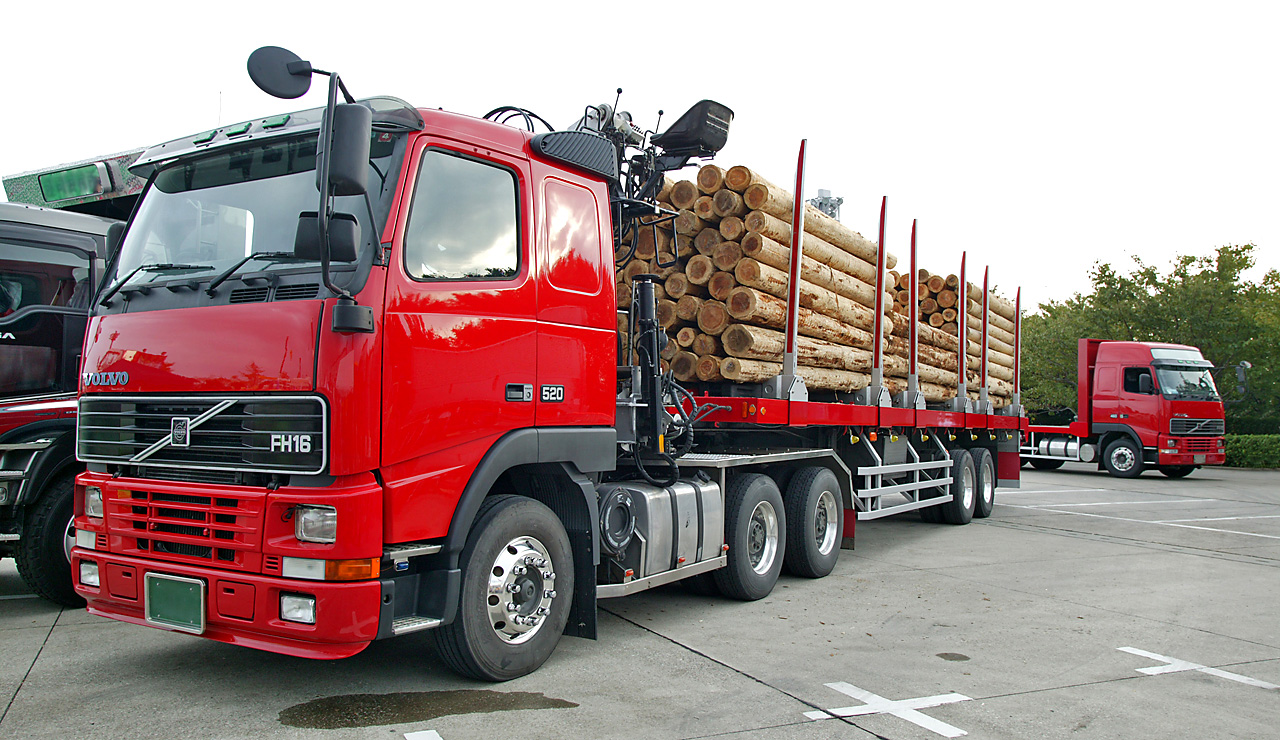
A first generation FH16 prime mover

There were two models, FH12 and FH16 which shared common cabs and chassis. The FH12 won "Truck of the year" award in 1994. The 16-litre engine, gearboxes, and the driveline were carried over from the previous generation, albeit with improvements and additional features including all-new Volvo engine management and its diagnostics for the D12A engine.

=== Design and technology ===
==== Cab ====
The cab produced at Umeå from hot-dip galvanized, high tensile steel allowed for greater strength at thinner panels and box sections while reducing overall weight. The new FH cab was more aerodynamically efficient, with improved ergonomics and seating while reducing the overall weight of the cab by almost 30%. The cabin was extensively tested in a wind tunnel to confirm shape aerodynamics properties to reduce air-drag thus improving fuel efficiency. The cab featured a more sharply raked windscreen while wedge-shaped sides rounded into the front panel at much wider radius corners and the rear vision mirrors were also streamlined. The cabin was subject to the toughest cab impact test where procedure involved placing a 15-tonne static weight on the roof and one-tonne pendulum striking at the cab rear wall and at the windscreen pillars, at the end of which the cab doors must be able to be opened. In 1995 Volvo FH series became first heavy-duty truck to be fitted with an SRS airbag to further improve passive safety.

==== D12 engine ====
From the design angle, the new D12A engine was one of the largest engine projects from Volvo Trucks since the 1950s at the time. The basic design was still based on direct injection in-line six diesel engines around 12 litres displacement but with entirely different fuel and valve systems when compared with previous Volvo engines. Built at the purpose-built facility at Skövde on a fully automated line where the bulk of the engine assembly is done by robots and the final engine dressing is carried out manually. The D12A was designed as a "world engine" to be able to meet the latest demands in high power output, low fuel consumption and lower emissions with its single OHC (overhead camshaft) design, four valves per cylinder, and one centrally located electronic unit injector, integrated engine compression brake and two-piece, steel and aluminium pistons. The engine design left the door open for future upgrades in both power output and emission technologies.

==== VEB ====
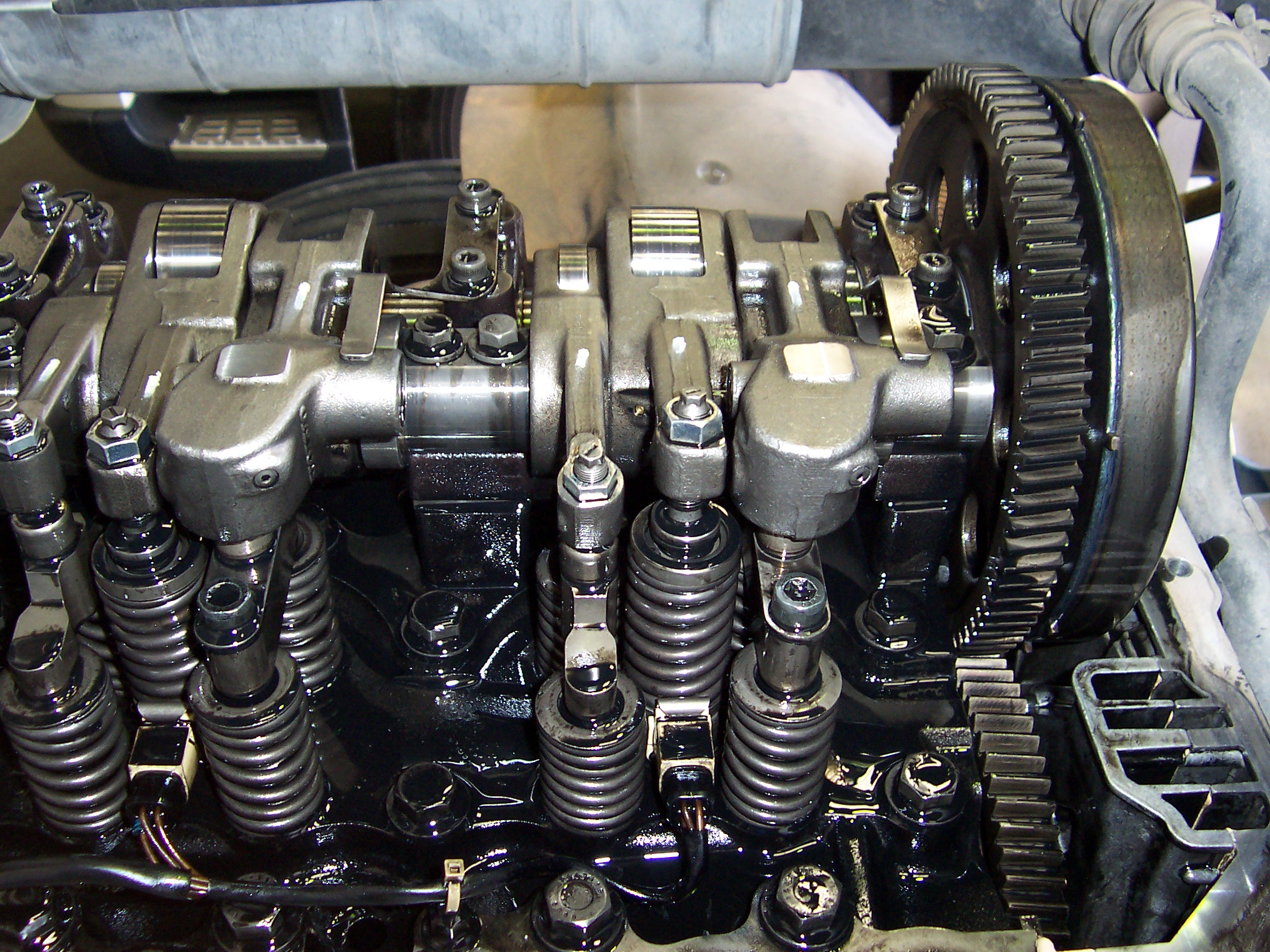
A view of VEB rocker arms

The Volvo engine brake (VEB) is a compression type engine brake first introduced on D12A and since used on later designed OHC engines from 9 to 16 litre displacement. The brake operates on a principle where exhaust valve cam followers act on a secondary cam profile when engine brake is activated. Engine oil pressure is used to eliminate extra valve clearance thus this action forces the follower against secondary lobes and unseating exhaust valves temporarily to achieve so-called compression bleeding as employed by similar systems from Jacobs, Cummins and Mack however Volvo system has an extra cam lobe thus giving two openings of the exhaust valves and is designed to work in conjunction with an exhaust brake so two of the engine's four strokes are used to raise engine braking effect - Exhaust and Compression strokes.

- Operation description
  - The exhaust stroke is used when exhaust brake shutter closes exhaust manifold after turbocharger opening as a result exhaust back pressure is raised creating the braking effect.
  - The compression stroke is used next to utilise the backpressure in exhaust where at the piston's Bottom Dead Centre the exhaust valve is opened briefly and high pressure in the exhaust manifold is then let in acting against the piston moving upwards on its compression stroke thus slowing it even more [further explanation needed, exhaust braking functions in relation to cylinder pressure, not piston speed] and increasing the engine braking effect.
  - At the end of the compression stroke just before piston's Top Dead Centre exhaust valves are open briefly again to release "bleed" compression thus again slowing the piston on its subsequent downwards movement and consequently achieving engine braking effect while also storing the pressure in the exhaust manifold again using the exhaust brake shutter ready for the next repeat of the cycle.

=== Version 98 (1998–2002) ===
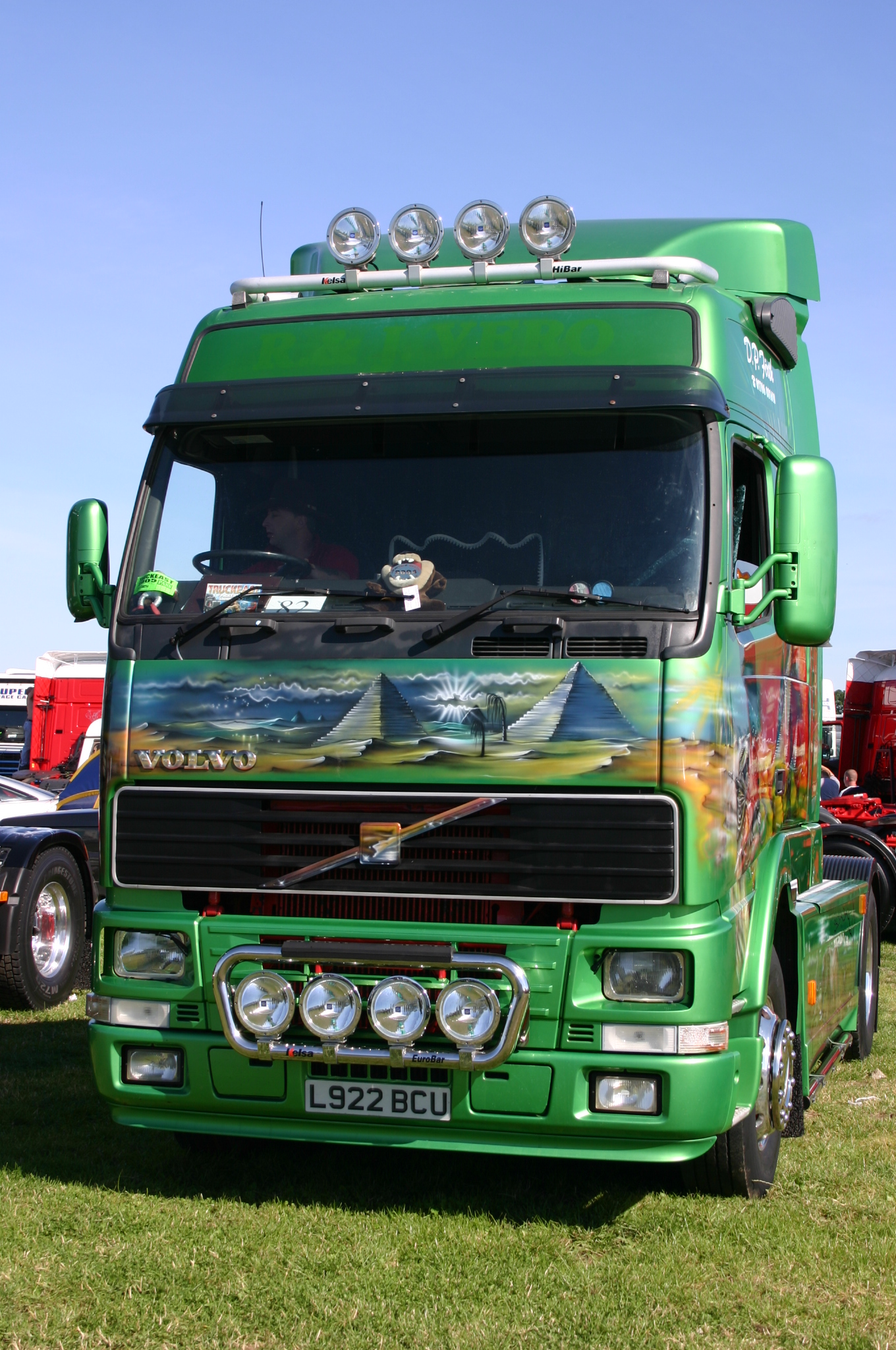
FH12

In conjunction with the introduction of the FM series in 1998, Volvo facelifted the existing FH series with minor modifications to the cab, accompanied by major upgrades to the electrical system, engine, and gearbox. The so-called truck electronic architecture (TEA) introduced a technical solution to possibility of various electronic control units to work and communicate with one another. The systems have been linked using two data buses or data links which allowed control units to exchange relevant information over the data network.

==== Electronics ====
TEA is a computerized control and monitoring system which is used to control and coordinate the various functions of the vehicle main components. The control units communicate over what is known as CAN at two speeds SAEJ1587/1708 @9600 bit/s and SAEJ1939 at 250 000 bit/s where up to eight Electronic Control Units were used to control various functions. A J1939 data link is used for mission-critical rapid communication among ECUs and J1587/1808 is used for diagnostic and programming links as well as "slow" communication e.g. for backup purposes. The new instrument cluster included an LCD panel to show information or diagnostic messages from the systems broadcast via the J1708 data link.

==== D12 facelift ====
The original D12A engine was considered as a rather conservatively power rated and expectations of higher power output from such an engine design were always at the mind of not only the designer but customers alike. The D12C differs from an earlier version substantially with a completely redesigned engine head, timing gears, and addition of bottom end of reinforcement with a stiffening subframe to cope with increased power output to 460 hp (340 kW).

==== Gearbox ====
The gearboxes were based on the previous SR1900 series and shared the same number of gears and gear change pattern. The SR2400 series gearbox was discontinued and replaced with the now same model shared across the entire FH and FM range. Torque increases from 1900 Nm to 2500 Nm were due to changes to the machining of the gears as well as the use of the new type of narrower synchromesh mechanism allowing increased gear width. The single control housing and the synchro-mechanism reduced the gearchange effort by about 50%. The control housing was also identical for left and right-hand drive versions reducing overall production cost and assembly.

== Second generation (2002–2012) ==
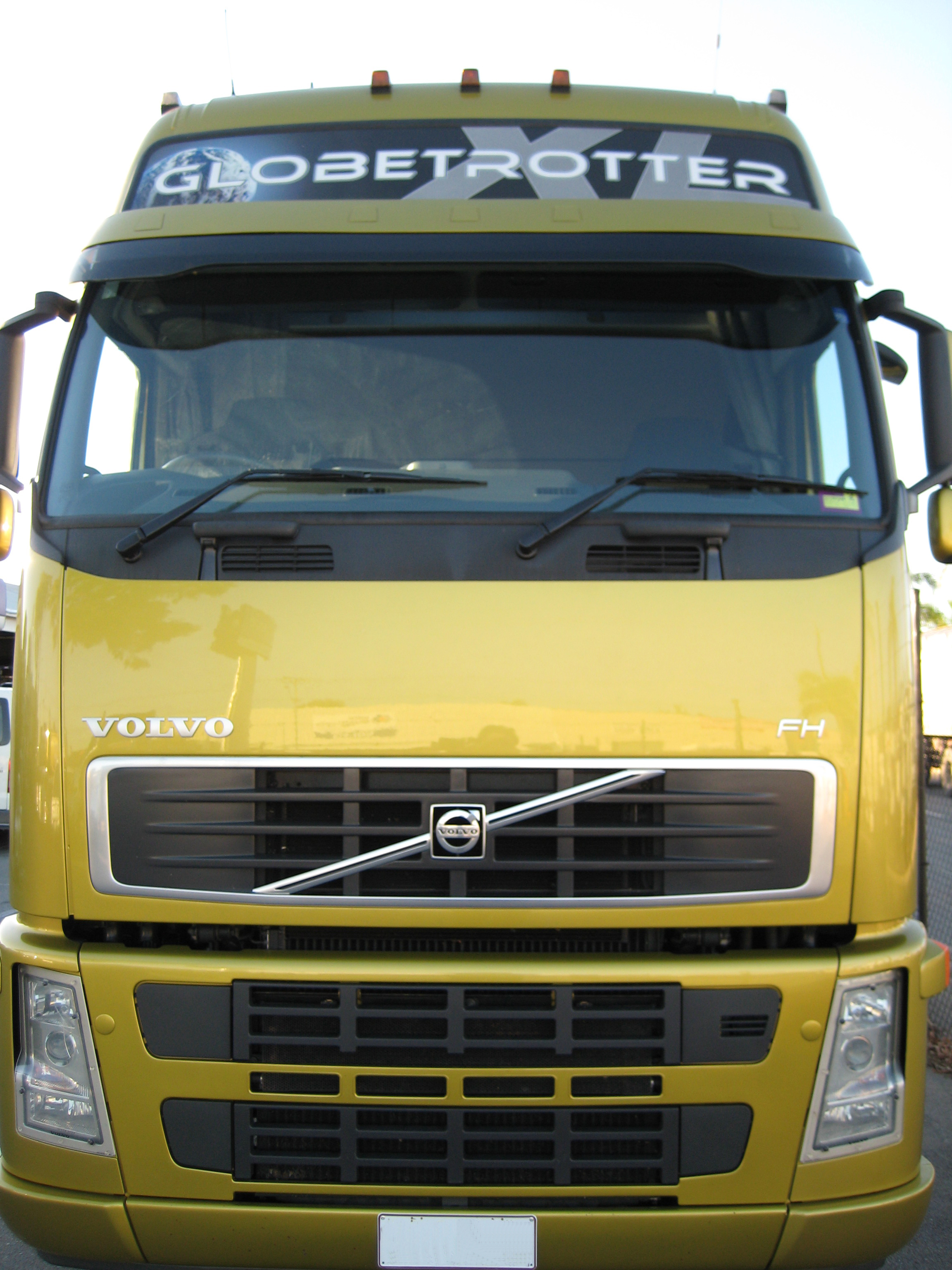
FH version 2

In 2001 Volvo introduced the second generation of the FH and FM series with the cab and driveline given a major makeover. with an investment cost of €600 million Major changes included a redesign of the cab to improve aerodynamics, the new automatic gearchange transmission, I shift, new electronics system and engine improvements.

=== Cab ===
The changes to the cab included a new day cab, which is 150 mm longer with a redesigned air intake and flat floor. New rearview mirrors were introduced to reduce blind spots and improve airflow, new headlights, and front side marker lights, a new split sun visor, and new wider front steps complemented the external modifications. The interior was redesigned with more rounded edges around the dashboard and new seats with integrated seatbelts. Integrated telephone speaker and microphone with steering wheel controls for the radio and inbuilt GSM phones were an option.

As a standard equipment FH models also included front underrun protection system (FUPS) to further enhance safety by preventing smaller vehicles from being "underrun" or wedged under front of the truck in an event of frontal collision.

=== TC and I-Shift ===
- D12D's further development of venerable D12C resulted in increased power output to 500 hp (370 kW) equipped with turbo compound (TC) technology which utilise more energy from exhaust gases after the turbocharger using an extra turbine to drive the engine crankshaft via hydraulic clutch and reduction gearing. The cooling system changes coincided with more advanced electronics for engine management systems= (EMS) with an electronically controlled cooling fan which was now fully controlled by the Engine ECU (EECU) and as a result fuel consumption is also reduced.
- I-Shift transmissions is a concept of manual transmission with computerized gear change control transmission management system (TMS) which contains two ECU's the transmission control unit (TECU) and the gear selector control unit (GECU). I-Shift borrowed from old transmission technologies like non-synchronised main gears which allowed a reduction in size and weight and a countershaft brake to achieve more precise shift control while matching engine rpm to transmissions rpm e.g. TECU requests the EECU to correct engine rpm so as to synchronise the rpm to effect a smooth gear change, similar to double-clutching.
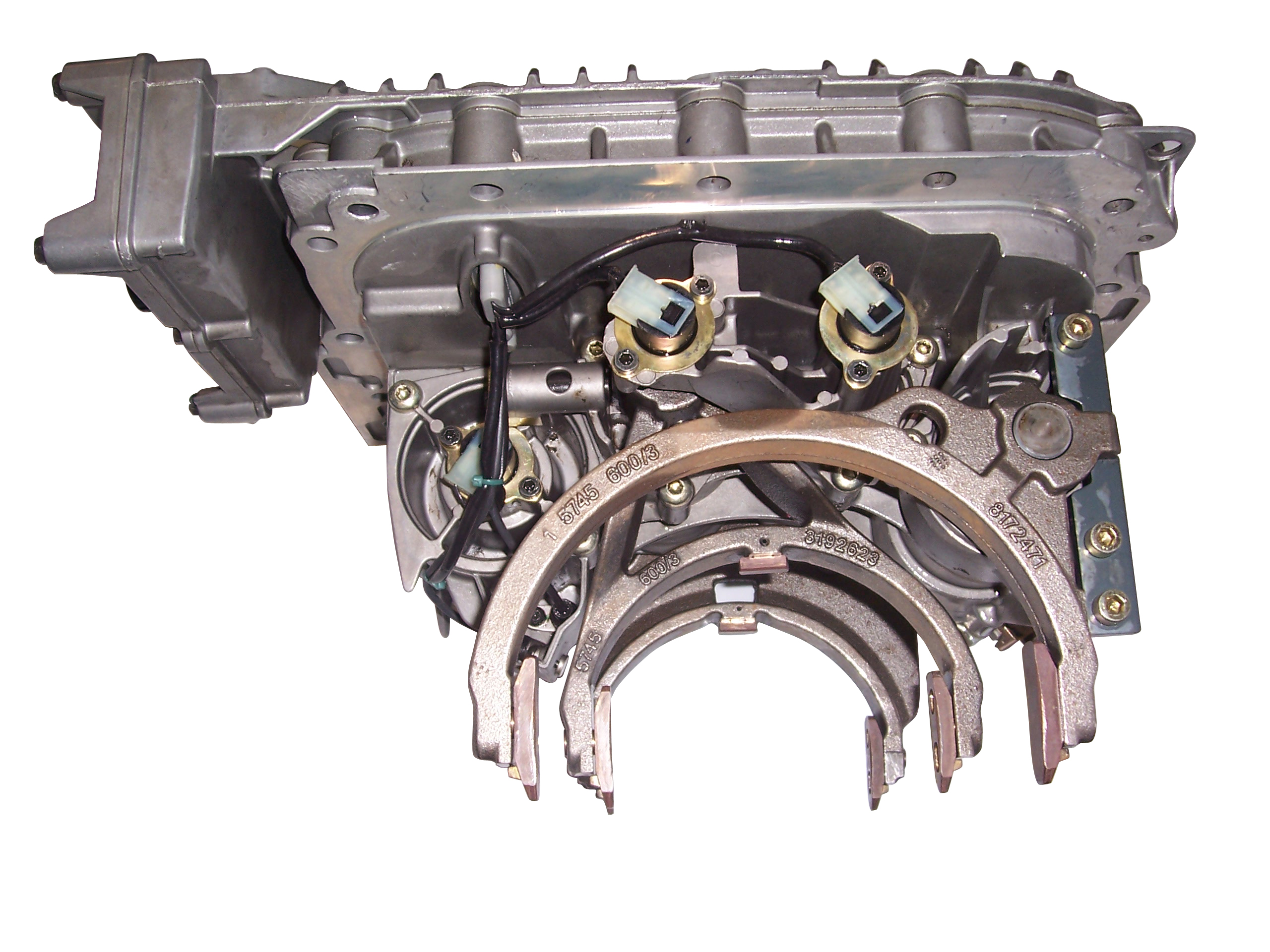
I-Shift control housing

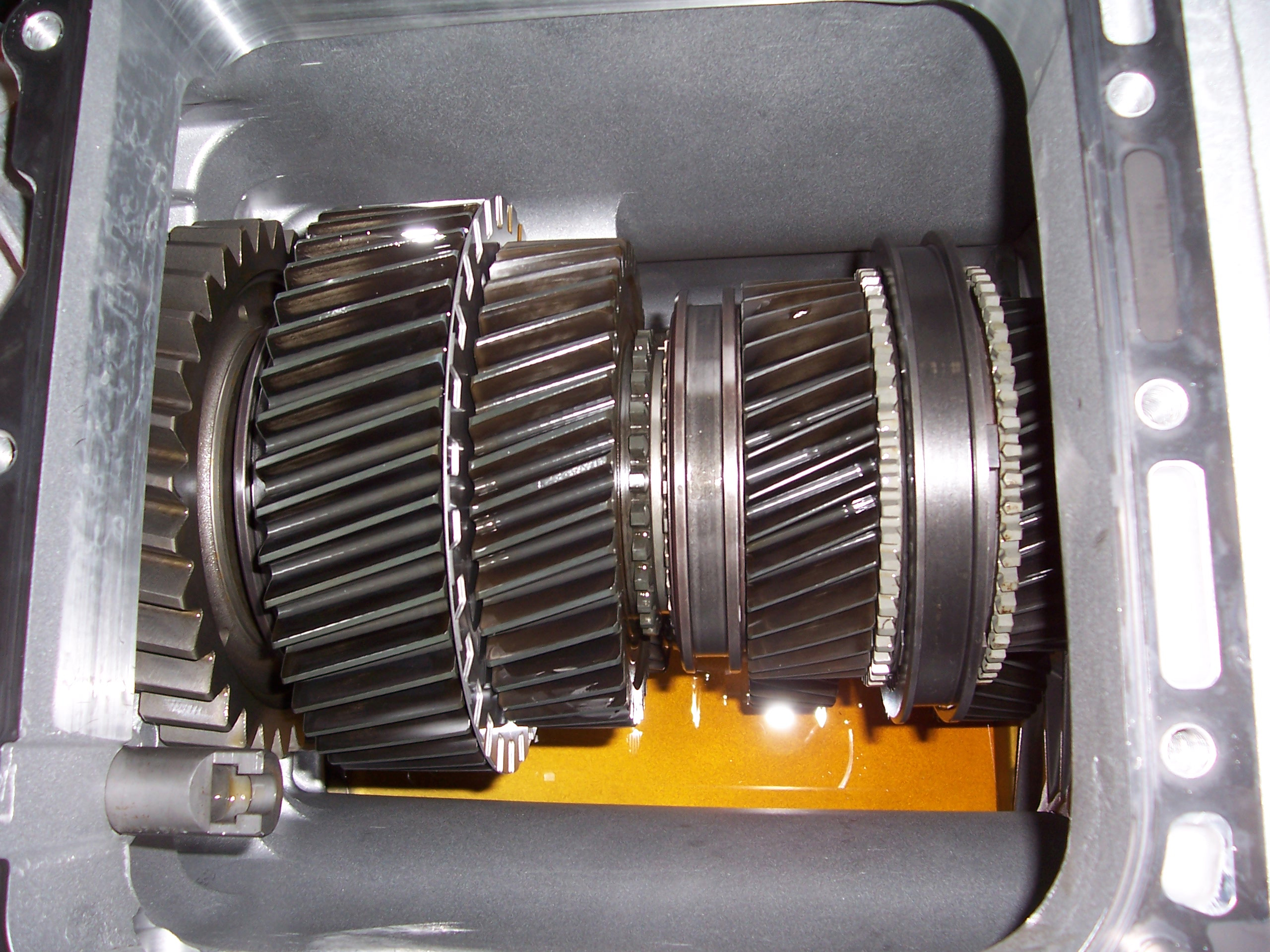
Inside an I-Shift

=== 2003 FH16 Intelligent Power ===
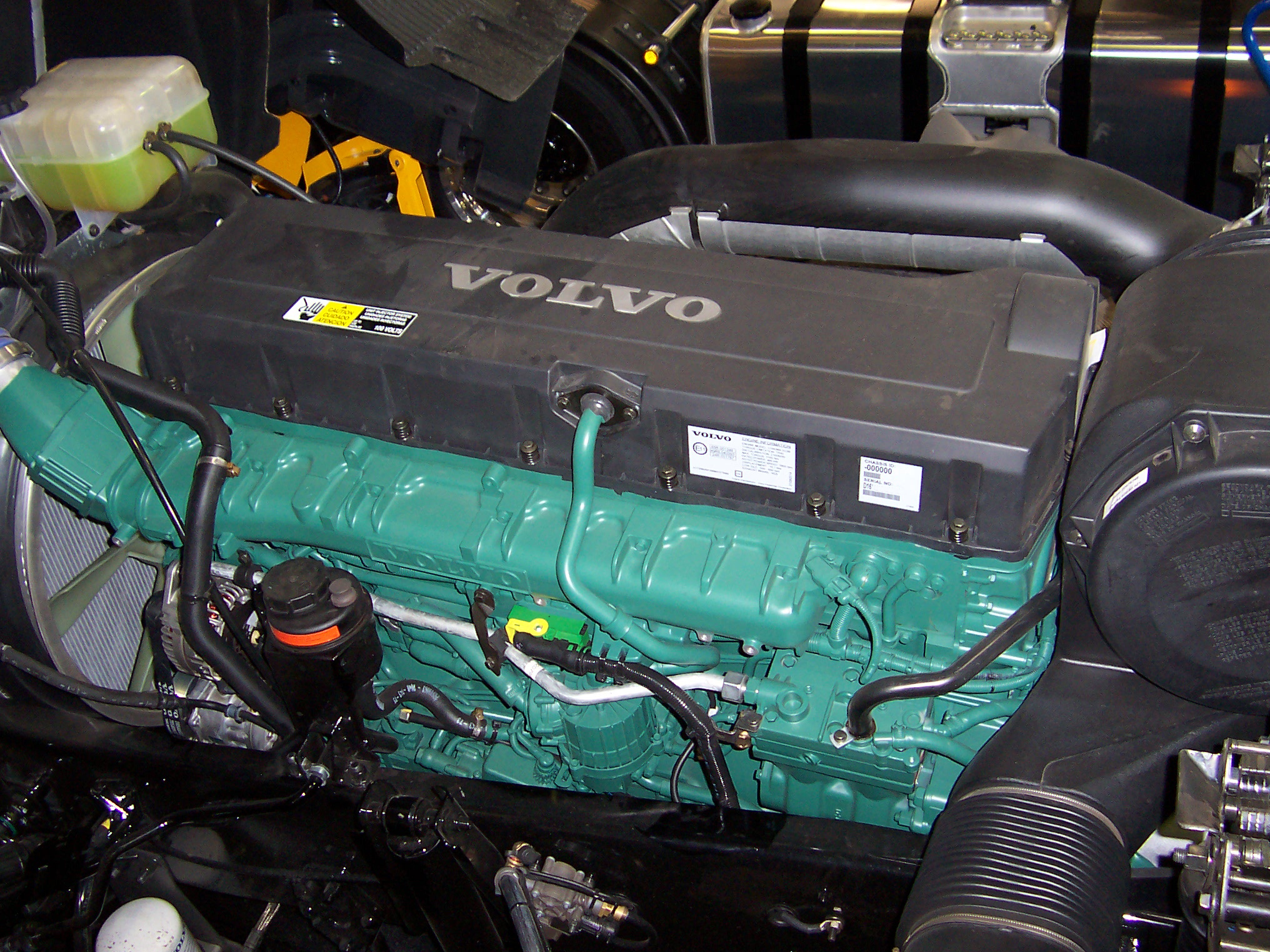
D16E engine

After delaying introduction of new 16 litre engine for 2 years in 2003 Volvo introduced one of the most powerful trucks ever built. The D16C engine was available in two power outputs configurations 550 hp (410 kW) and 610 hp (450 kW) and it was a completely new design similar in the lines of D9 engine introduced a couple of years earlier for FM series. The notable design changes included timing gears being on the flywheel side of the engine (rear-mounted), a design which allows for increased airflow around the engine, more precise injection and valve operation, noise reduction, and manufacturing cost due to flywheel casing being used to house timing gears as well. In 2005 Volvo had increased the available power of D16C to 660 hp (490 kW) respectively making in it one of the most powerful production truck available. Currently D16E engines are available in Selective Catalytic Reduction at power output 580 hp 640 hp 700 hp (520 kW).

=== 2005–2008 FH ===
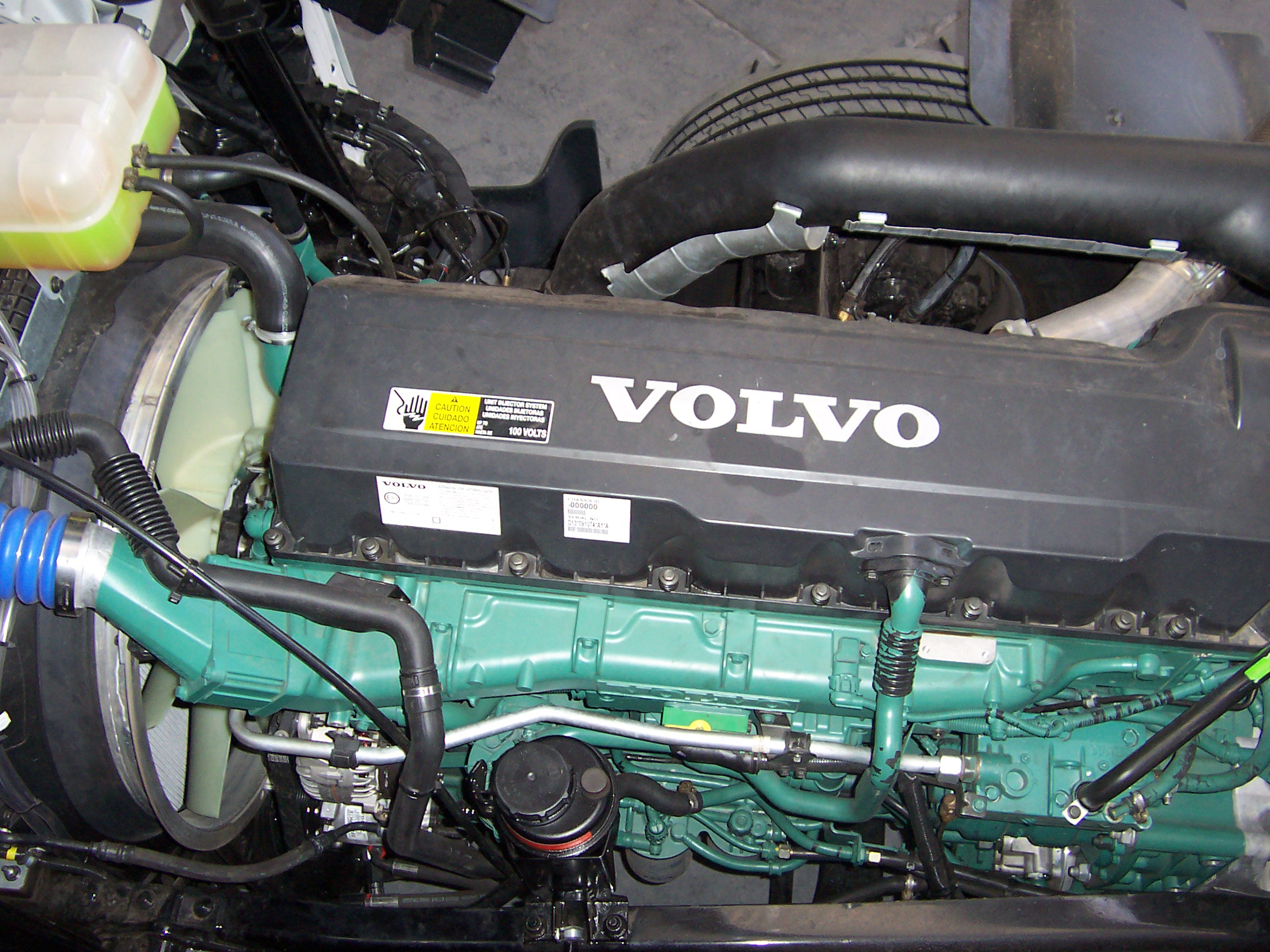
D13A engine

In 2005 Volvo introduced new design 13 litre unit D13A incorporating the same design features as its 9 and 16 litre engines and available in various power output variants from 360 hp (270 kW), 400 hp, 440 hp, 480 hp (360 kW) to 520 hp (390 kW). Initially available to meet Euro III emissions requirements, further improvements will enable the engine to meet or exceed Euro IV and possibly Euro V emissions targets. D13A featured closed-crankcase ventilation and also included a new type of unit injector (UI) E3 from Delphi. As a part of makeover Volvo has also removed its naming scheme and decided to drop engine size in the model name so the models are known from now as FH only. Volvo had also introduced on D13A engine with Selective Catalytic Reduction an improved version of its engine compression brake the "VEB+" featuring additional helper rocker arm and a fourth cam lobe per cylinder. Power outputs available from 360 hp, 400 hp, 440 hp (330 kW) and 480 hp (360 kW).

In 2007 Volvo introduced D13B with Exhaust Gas Recirculation configuration and VGT turbocharger but without exhaust particle filter and is the only manufacturer to offer this solution thus far. The engines are available in slightly reduced power output ranging from 360 hp, 400 hp, 440 hp (330 kW) and 500 hp (370 kW) and being shared with FM series however 500 hp (370 kW) option is only available for FH series.

=== 2008–2012 FH and FH16 Mk.III ===
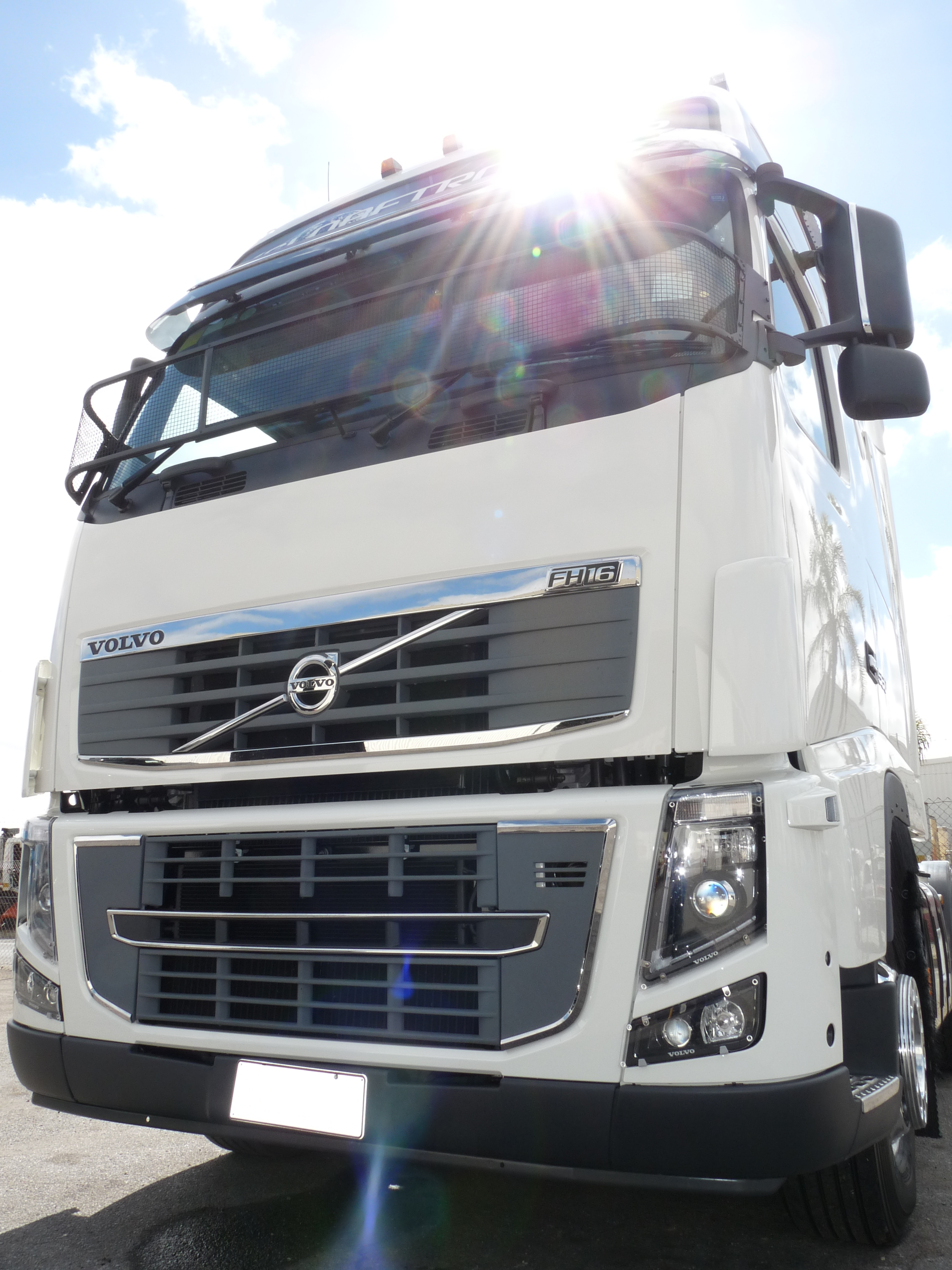
FH16 Mk.II

In August 2008, Volvo launched an upgrade to the FH series with the main emphasis on driver comfort and usability, among features listed are windscreen wipers controlled by a rain sensor, cornering lights for better visibility when turning, powerful audio system with USB aux and MP3 inputs as well as a swiveling passenger seat. Completely redesigned grill, steps, sun visor, and headlamps combination were the most obvious visible changes over previous models. Only 6 months later Volvo once again claimed a first with the FH16 and 700 hp (520 kW) on tap introducing one of the world's most powerful production series truck. Continuing on its Euro V theme upgrades to 13 Litre engines and introduction of the new 11 Litre engine followed a few months later.

As a part of an ongoing commitment to road safety, a number of safety features were also improved like advanced radar-controlled cruise control, Driver Alert System (DAS) which keeps a tab on the driver's time behind the wheel with ongoing monitoring of the driver's responses, Lane Keeping Support (LKS) which alerts the driver when crossing over the lines and Lane Change Support (LCS) system responsible for alerting the driver when another vehicle is in the "blind spot" when attempting to change lanes.

In 2011 the new 750 hp version of the D16 was presented to the market. This engine will be delivered to customers around the new year 2012, celebrating 25 years of Volvo 16-litre truck engines.

== Third generation (2012–present) ==
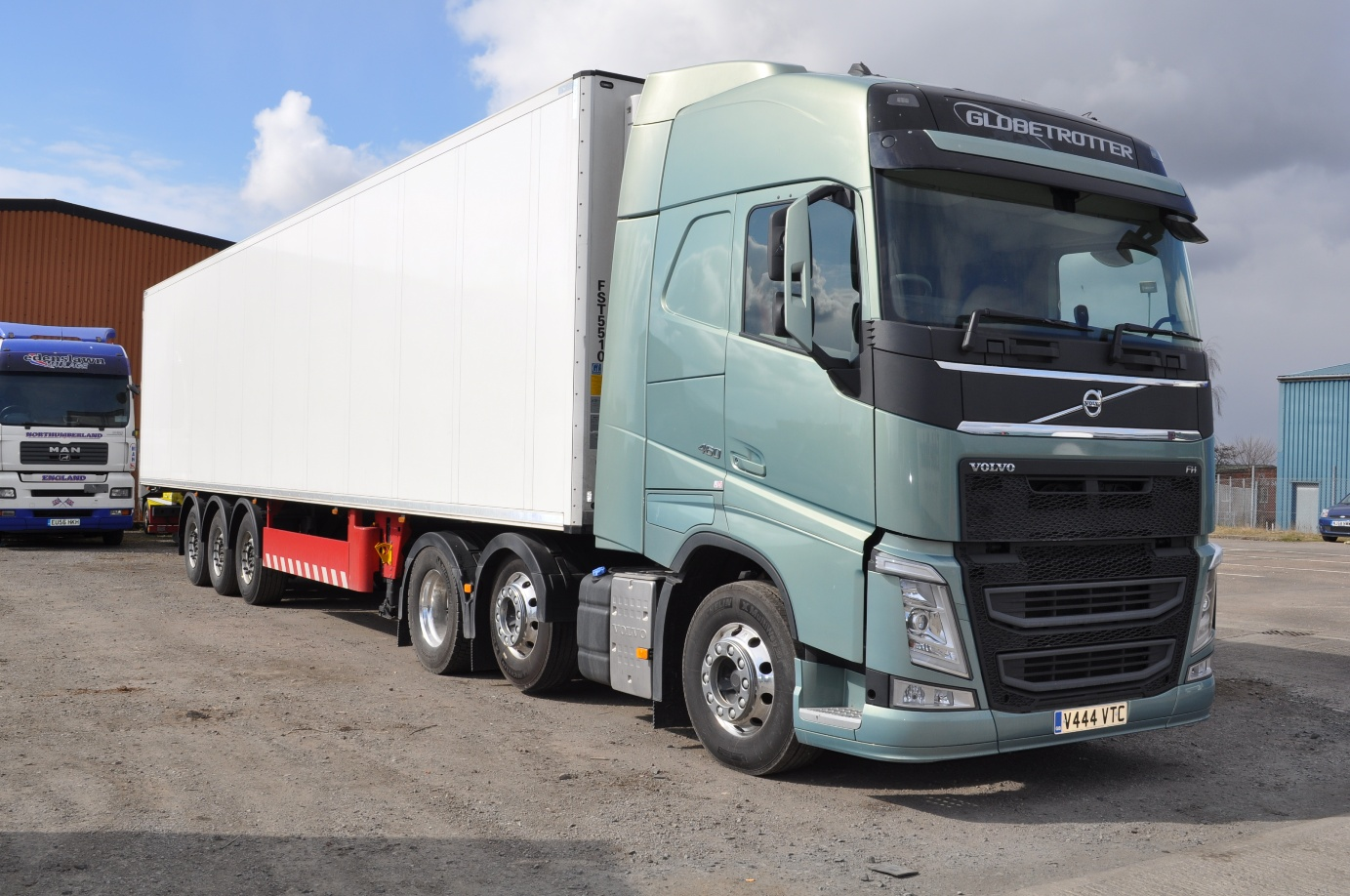
The 2012 model of Volvo FH

In September 2012, Volvo Trucks re-launched the Volvo FH with major technology upgrades, a new design, and more. The company also introduced the first of its Euro VI engines, the D13K which is available as an option on the new Volvo FH and compulsory for new trucks in Europe from January 2014. Other quotable new features are the I-torque driveline and the I-see fuel-saving technology. With the new thirteen-litre engine, the name has changed to FH13.

In India Volvo FH was introduced as FH520 Puller 6x4 with a company fitted ballast box due to new Automotive Research Association of India regulations for ballast tractors used to tow hydraulic modular trailers. Later in 2021 FH520 was discontinued in India replaced by FM500 Puller 6x4 which is also sold with a company fitted ballast box.

=== Autonomous Emergency Braking ===
Volvo Trucks has demonstrated the new Autonomous Emergency Braking system that combines radar and a camera that works together to identify and monitor vehicles in front. The system is designed to deal with both stationary and moving vehicles and can prevent a collision with a moving target at relative speeds of up to 70 km/h. When the system detects a vehicle that the truck will hit at its current speed, the warning system activates a constant red light in the windscreen in order to bring the driver's attention back to the road.

=== 2020 facelift ===
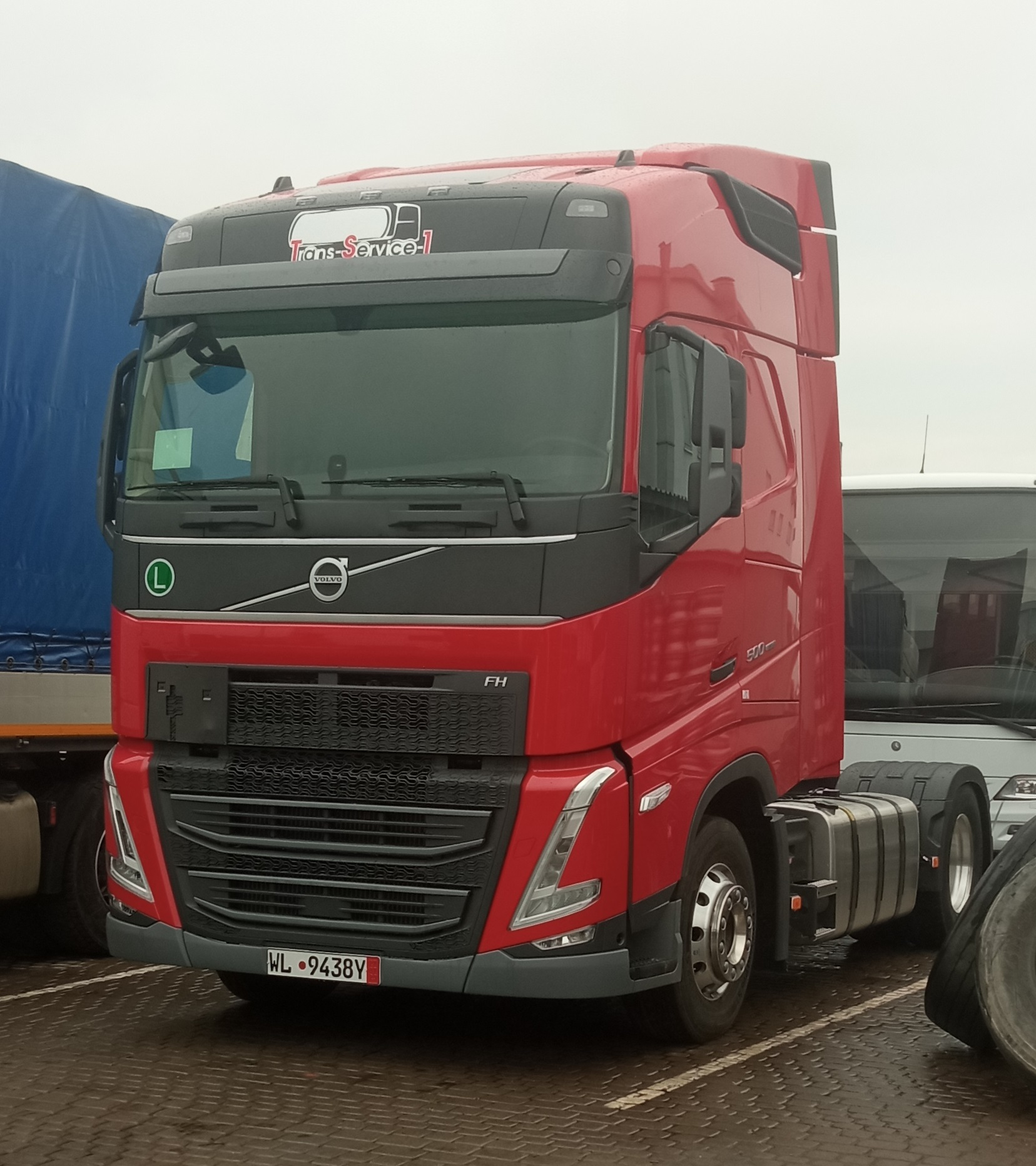
Volvo FH (2020 facelift)

The truck received a facelift in 2020, with most notably a new headlight design, an updated interior, new safety features, and efficiency improvements. The pre-facelift model continues to be offered in selected markets where the facelifted model was introduced, now marketed as Volvo FH Classic for models with 13-litre engines and Volvo FH16 Classic for models with 16-litre engines. Volvo also launched an electric truck in 2021.

The FH received a minor update in 2024, featuring new LED roof lights, revised logo and badging, updated I-See, updated aerodynamics, updated infotainment, new Volvo Camera Monitoring System, the replacement of the D16K with the D17 with 3 outputs (600 PS and 3,000 Nm, 700 PS and 3,400 Nm, and 780 PS and 3,800 Nm), and improved efficiency.

=== Safety ===
Euro NCAP test results Volvo FH 4x2 Tractor Unit (2026)
Test	Score
Overall:	5 /5 stars
Safe driving	77%
Crash avoidance	85%
Post crash	80%

Euro NCAP test results Volvo FH 6x2 Rigid (2026)
Test	Score
Overall:	5 /5 stars
Safe driving	77%
Crash avoidance	85%
Post crash	80%

== FH Aero (2024–present) ==
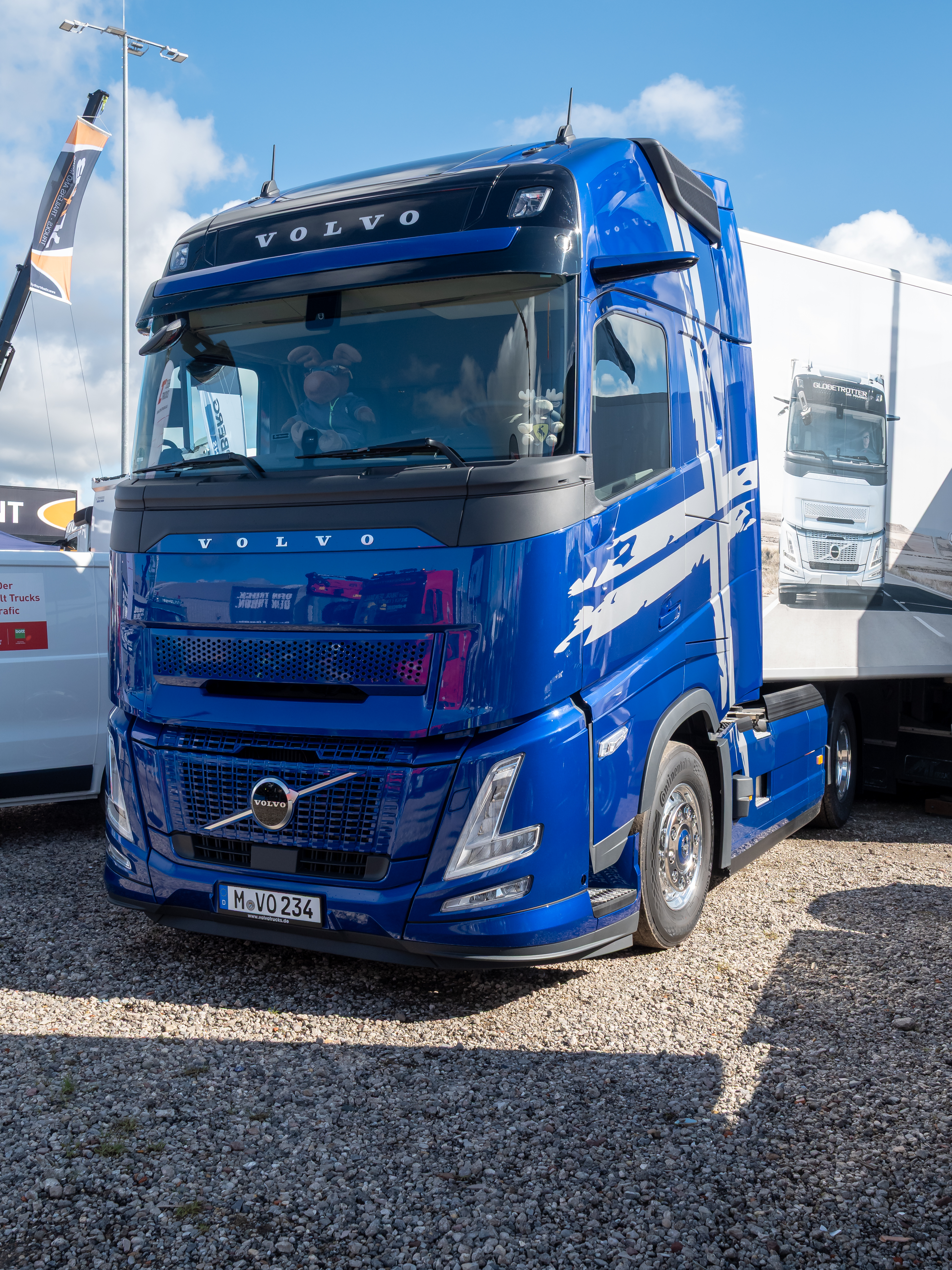
Volvo FH Aero front

Volvo Trucks introduced the FH Aero in 2024, which has an extended and sleeker cab design, equipped with digital mirrors and a more powerful, new 17.3-litre engine, producing up to 780 PS (574 kW) and 3,800 N⋅m (2,803 lb⋅ft) of torque. This model will be gradually introduced to markets between 2024 and 2025, and offered in four variants: FH Aero, FH Aero Electric, FH Aero gas-powered, and FH16 Aero.

=== Safety ===
Euro NCAP test results Volvo FH Aero 4x2 Tractor Unit (2024)
Test	Score
Overall:	5 /5 stars
Safe driving	80%
Crash avoidance	89%
Post crash	80%

Euro NCAP test results Volvo FH Aero 6x2 Rigid (2025)
Test	Score
Overall:	5 /5 stars
Safe driving	80%
Crash avoidance	85%
Post crash	80%

== Gallery ==
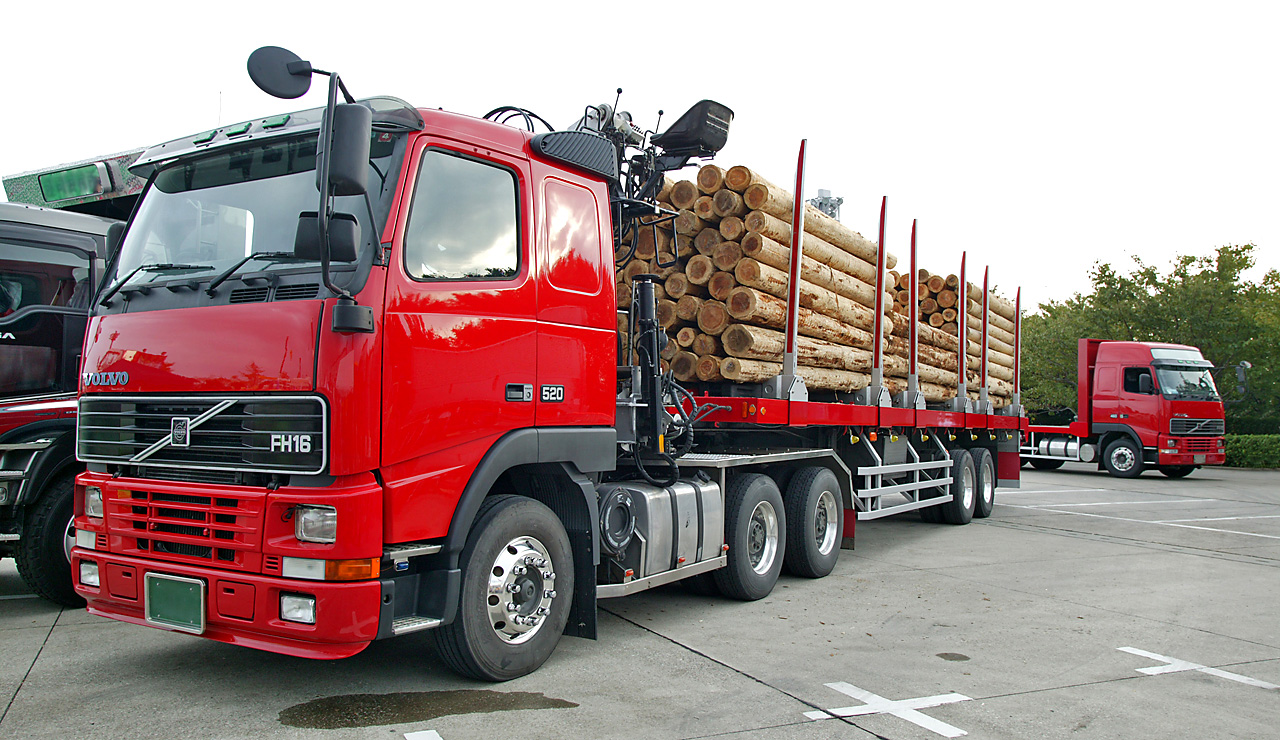
Volvo FH16 520 in Japan

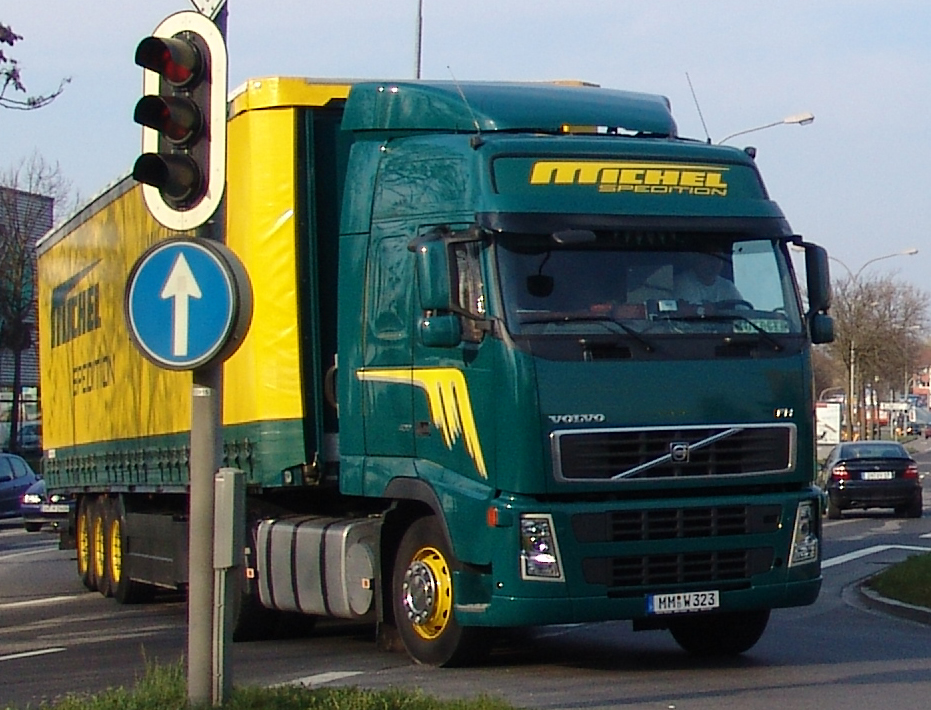
Volvo FH 400 with the 13-liter D13A Euro 4 engine

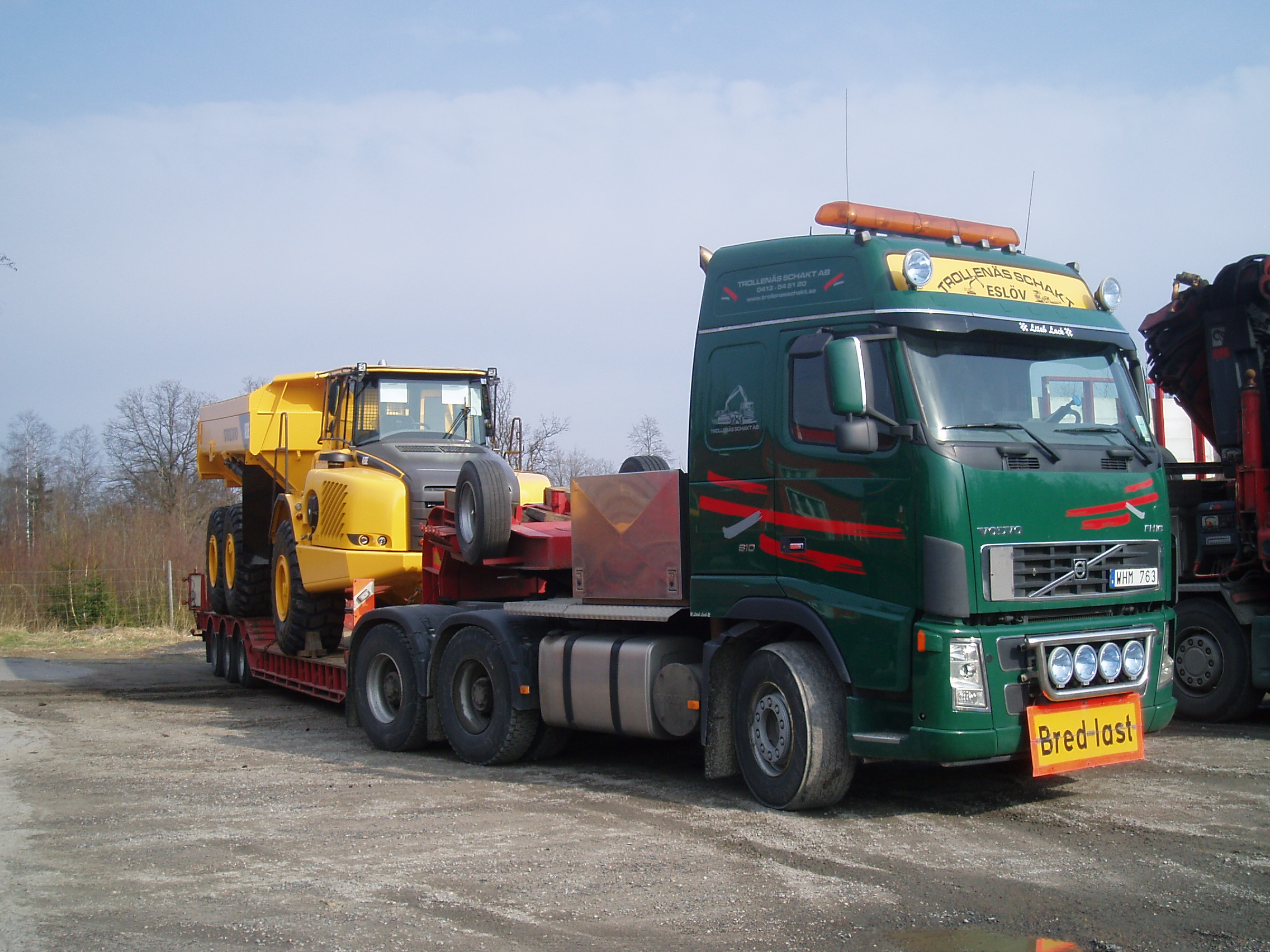
Volvo FH16 for heavy loads

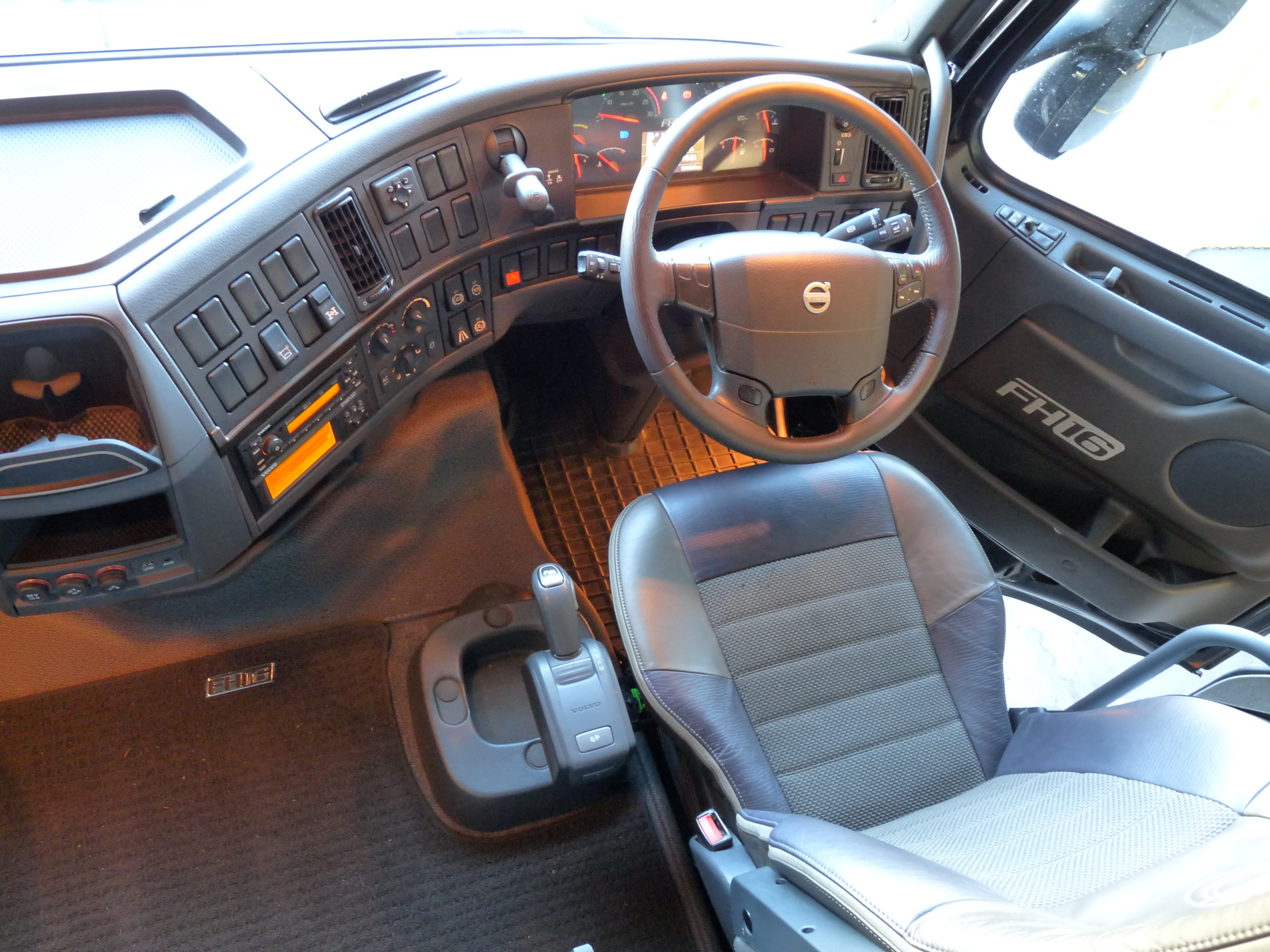
Inside Mk2 2009 Australian model

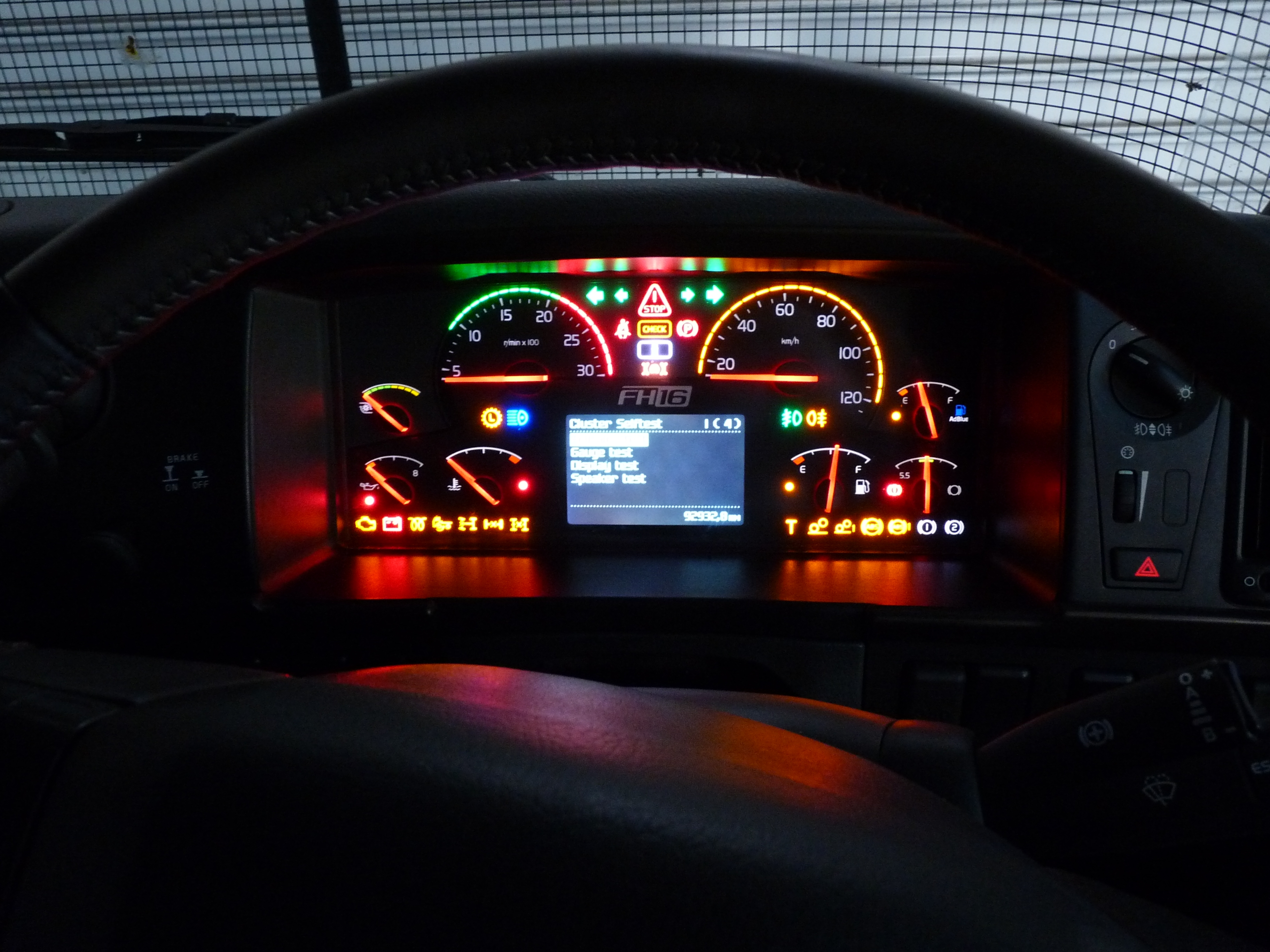
Mk2 instrument cluster

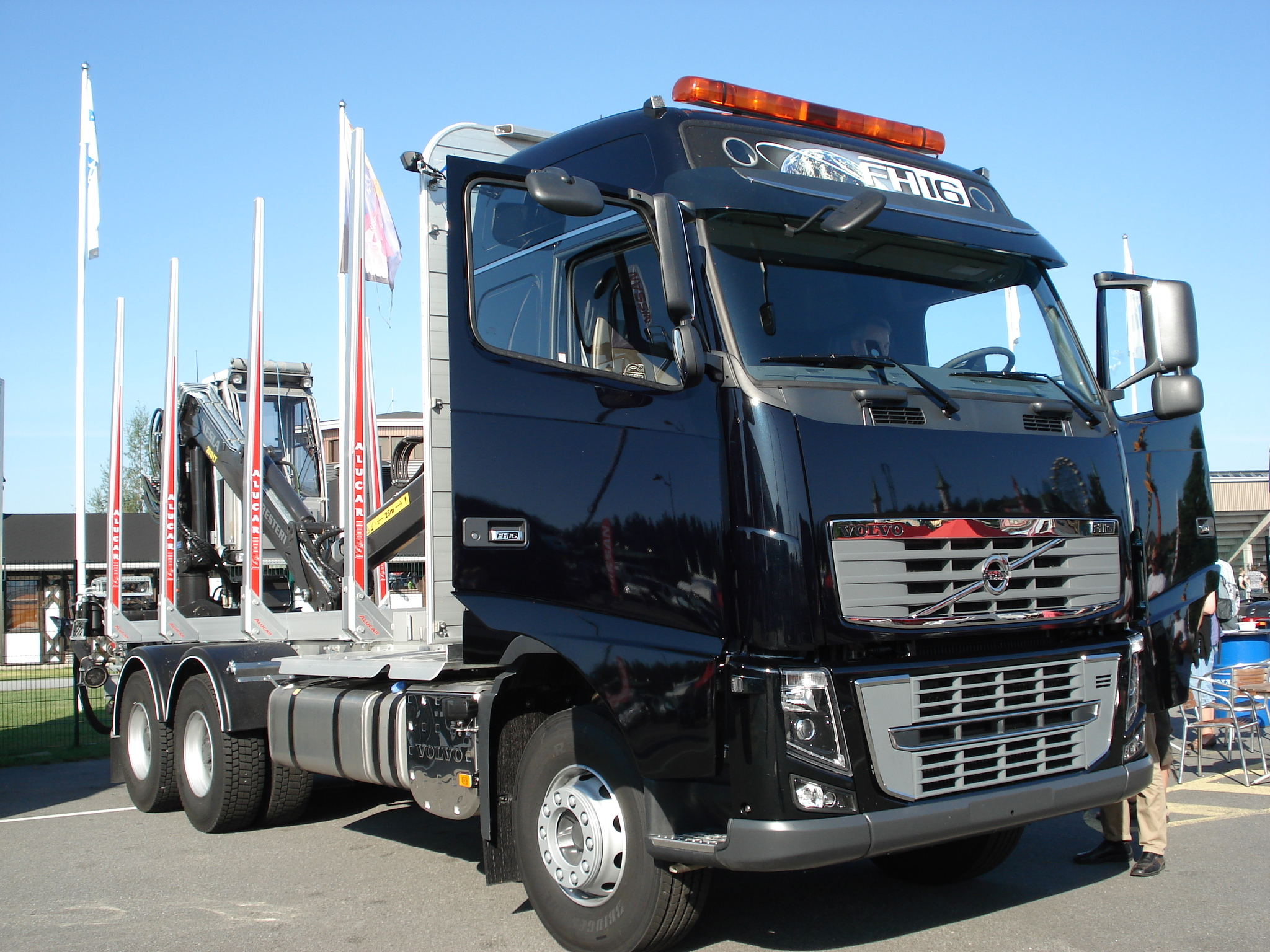
Volvo FH16 700

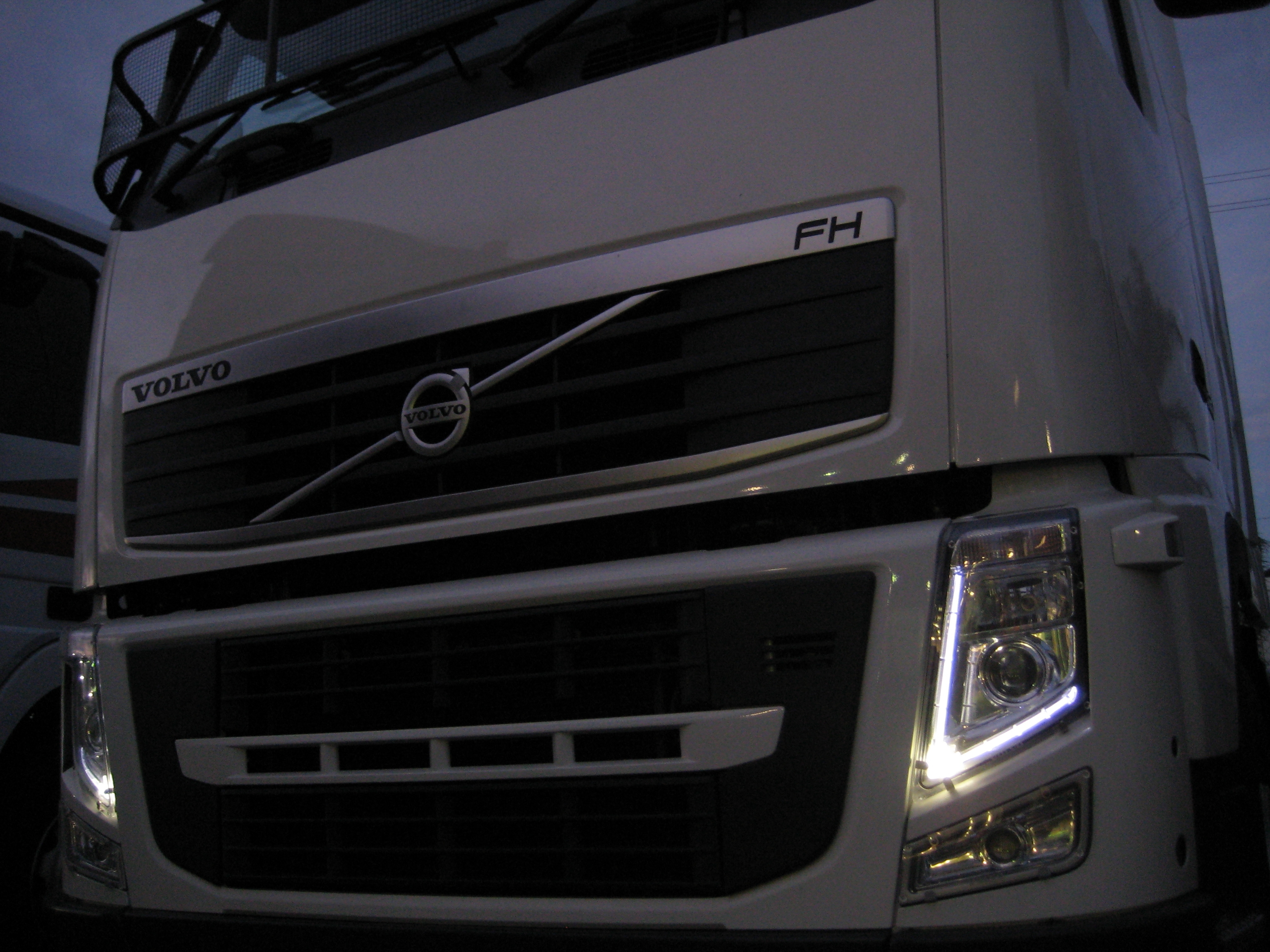
Volvo FH close up with its LED parker lights on
