= Volvo FL =

Volvo FL series
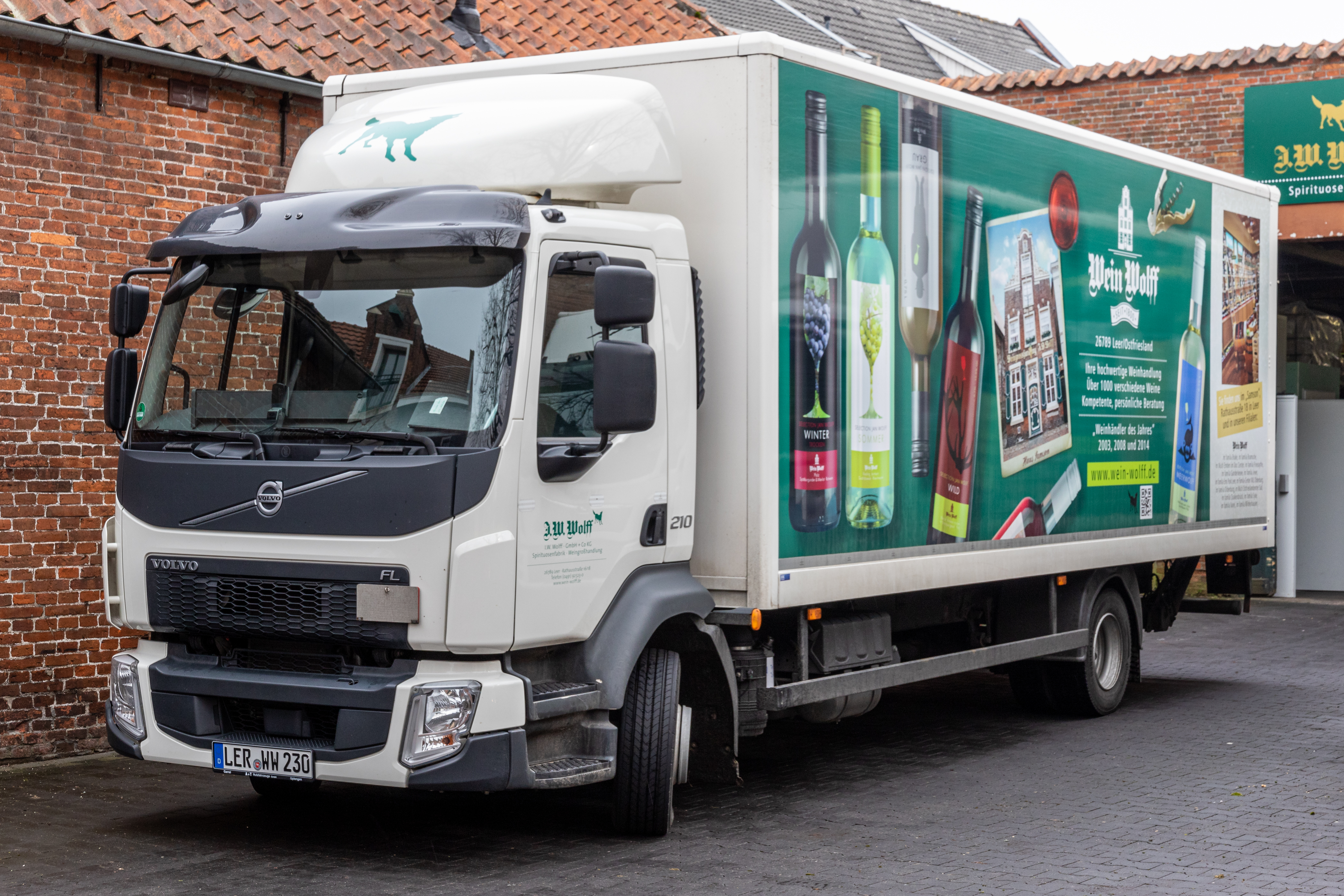
- Volvo FL Second Generation (Facelift)

Overview
- Manufacturer: Volvo Trucks
- Production: 1985–present

Body and chassis
- Class: Light truck
- Body style: COE: Day cab; Crew cab

Powertrain
- Power output: 180 kW (FL Electric)
- Battery: 565 kWh (FL Electric)

Chronology
- Predecessor: Volvo F6

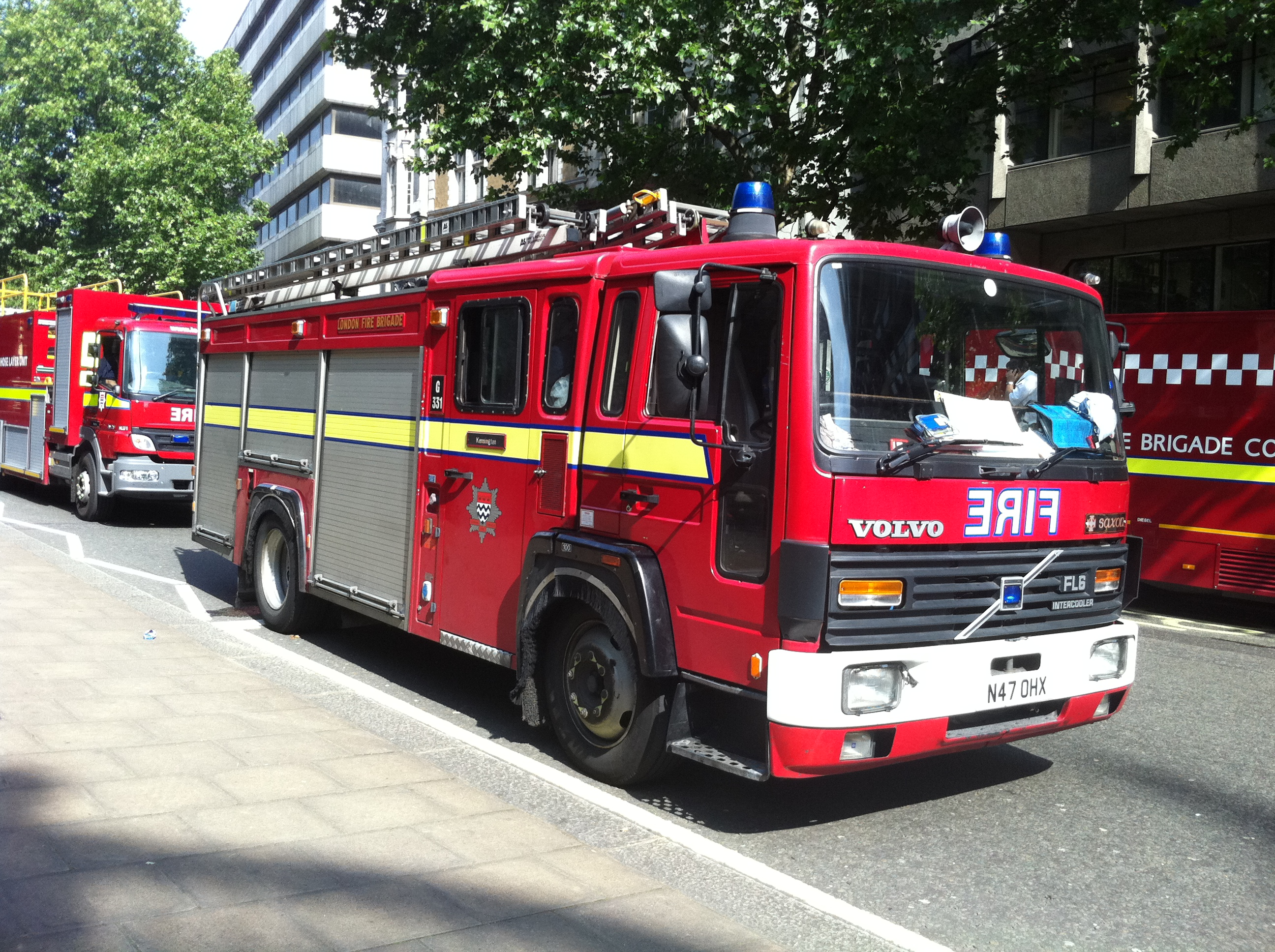
1995 Volvo FL double cab fire engine of the London Fire Brigade

The Volvo FL is a series of trucks manufactured by Volvo Trucks. It was introduced in 1985 and has remained in production ever since, in a variety of different models of different weight ratings. It has been used in a variety of different roles aside from a truck, including as a fire engine.

== First generation ==
"FL" stands for "Forward Control" and "Low-level Cab". The FL6 and the larger FL7 and FL10 appeared in the summer of 1985. In 1986 the smaller FL4 also appeared, with a 4-litre TD41 turbodiesel engine. The FL was developed after Volvo had lost much of its global market share in the medium weight segment by the 1970s, prompting the development of an entirely new model to replace the previous Volvo F series.

Beginning in 1995 some of the FL6 models were equipped with the D6A250 engine, which utilized a turbocharger as well as a supercharger. This allowed for an unusually high power-to-weight ratio and plentiful low-end torque. Volvo's larger D7A engine, as fitted to the FL7, could have been easily made to produce the same power but was considerably heavier as it was the same size as the ten-litre D10.

The FL4 and FL6 have a cabin 2.3 m (7.5 ft) wide, to allow for city use. The FL7 and FL10's cabins are 2.5 m (8.2 ft) wide. The heavier FL7 and FL10 was available in a variety of configurations, ranging from 4x2 to 8x6. In 1997 the Volvo FLC arrived, a lighter model rated for 7.5 tonnes (16,500 lb) rather than the 10 t (22,000 lb) of the regular FL. The FLC has Volvo's D4A 3989 cc turbodiesel with 135 PS (99 kW), a five-speed manual, and an air sprung rear axle.

=== FE6/7 (North America) ===
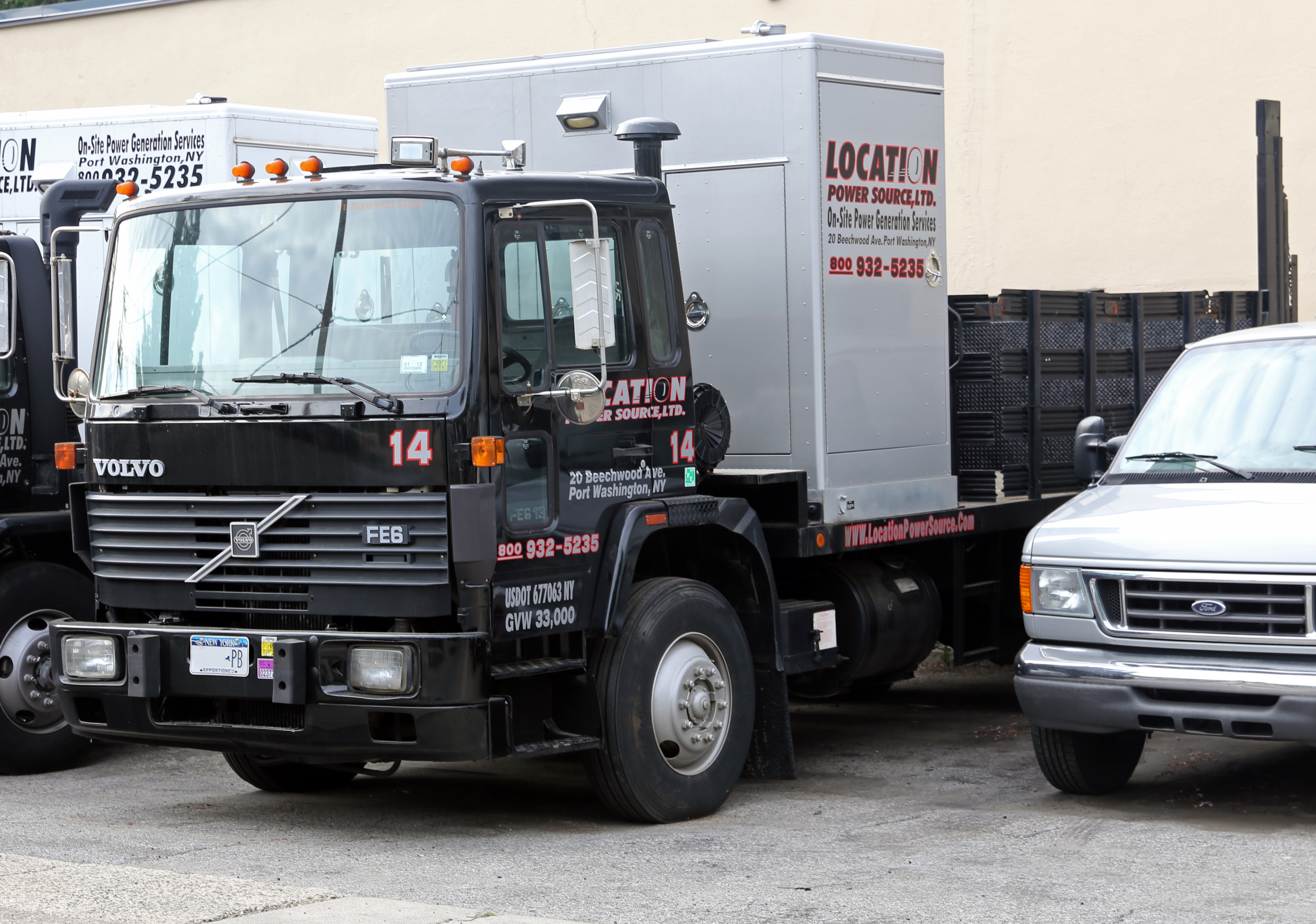
1992 Volvo FE6 (North America)

For North America, a version called the FE6 was introduced in 1986. There was also a heavier duty seven-litre version called the FE7 - this combines the narrow FL6 cabin with the engine of the FL7. Aside from Volvo's own engines, Caterpillar's 6.6 litre 3116 engine was also offered at a lower price. In 1990 the FE6/FE7 was gradually replaced by the FE42. This sturdy model used the Swedish-built FL/FE cab placed atop the chassis of the 1988 medium bonneted Volvo WG range. The name stood for "Forward control", "Economy", 4x2 configuration. Later the 6x4 FE64 was added to the lineup. In the mid-nineties sales of the FE42/64 series began shrinking as American truck buyers gradually changed back to conventional models. A tractor version was called the FE42T. The last model year for the American range was 1998.

=== FS7 ===
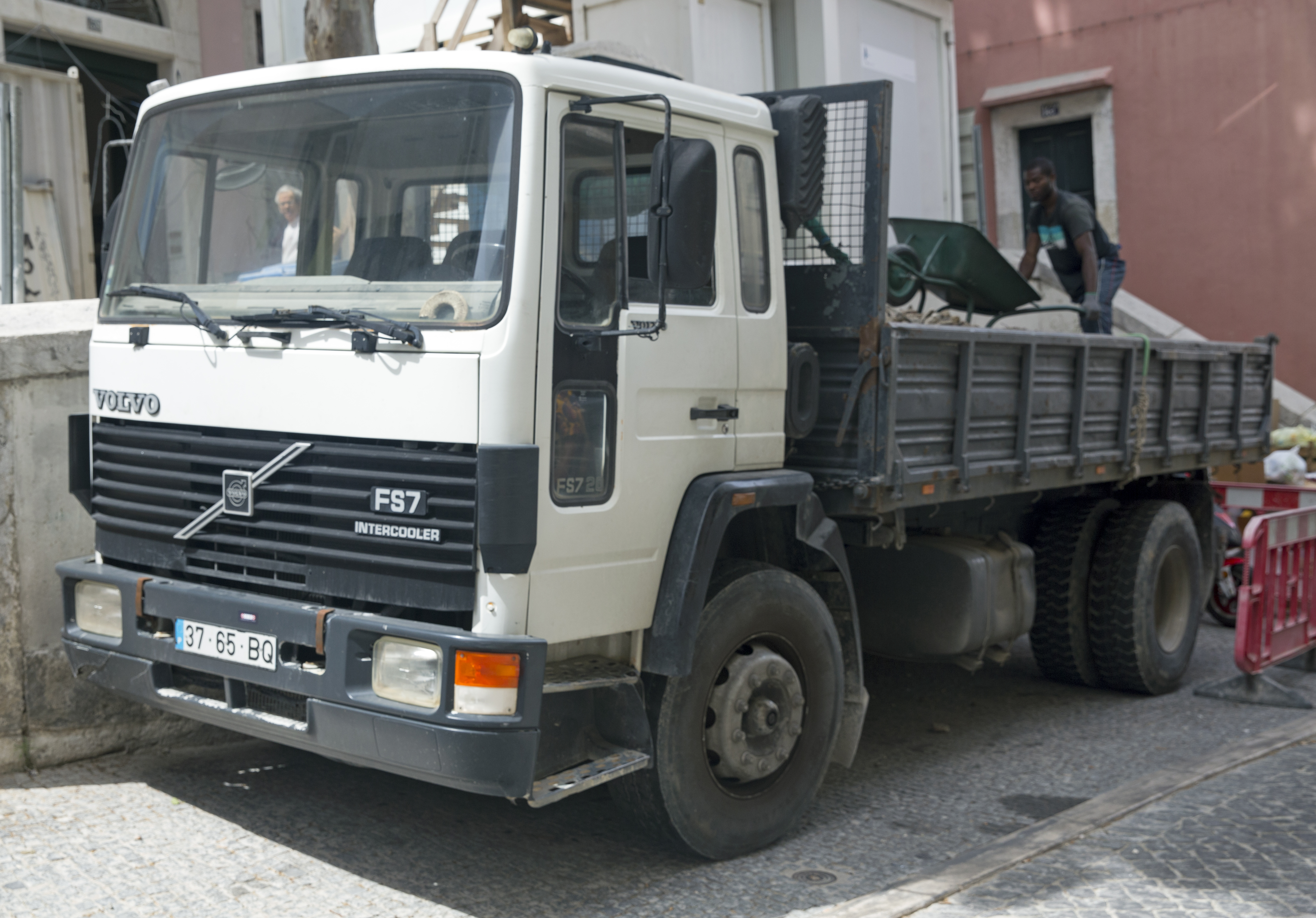
Volvo FS7 20 (Portugal)

For customers needing a compact truck with high maximum loads, the FS7 was presented in 1987. Very similar in execution to the US market FE7, it combined the FL6 cabin and chassis with the bigger 7-litre TD73 engine from the FL7. The FS7 was mainly intended for inner-city distribution roles and was manufactured until 1996, when the more powerful and even lighter FL6 Supercharged made the FS7 redundant.

=== Facelift ===
In 2000 the FL series received a facelift, which included a new front clip. The doors and cab structure remained mostly the same.

==== Engine (FL6) ====
The Volvo FL6 is powered by a Volvo D6B 180-250 hp, six-cylinder turbocharged and intercooled diesel engine. The control system had a major update, with Volvo's TEA electronics architecture to bring it to line with the rest of its bigger cousins. Inline fuel injection pump was replaced with the EDC rotary distributor pump from Bosch with the identical horsepower; despite the loss of supercharger from the previous D6A engine. The cruise control, automatic exhaust brake and accelerator now became the so-called fly by wire as standard. Full integration with the rest of the vehicle system such as Electronic Suspension Control and ABS made it much more efficient and user friendly.

==== Transmissions ====
The Volvo FL transmission is offered as a manual or as an automatic. The manual gearbox made by ZF Friedrichshafen AG for the Volvo FL has full synchromesh, 9-speed and a wide range of gear ratios. The manual gearbox also features an easy-changing gear selector that requires little pressure to operate.

The Automatic gearboxes made by Allison for the Volvo FL are available in several variants adapted to different engine models in 5-speed versions. Volvo FL gearboxes are fitted with a hydraulic torque converter to give superior starting traction and offer a high level of performance and excellent ergonomics.

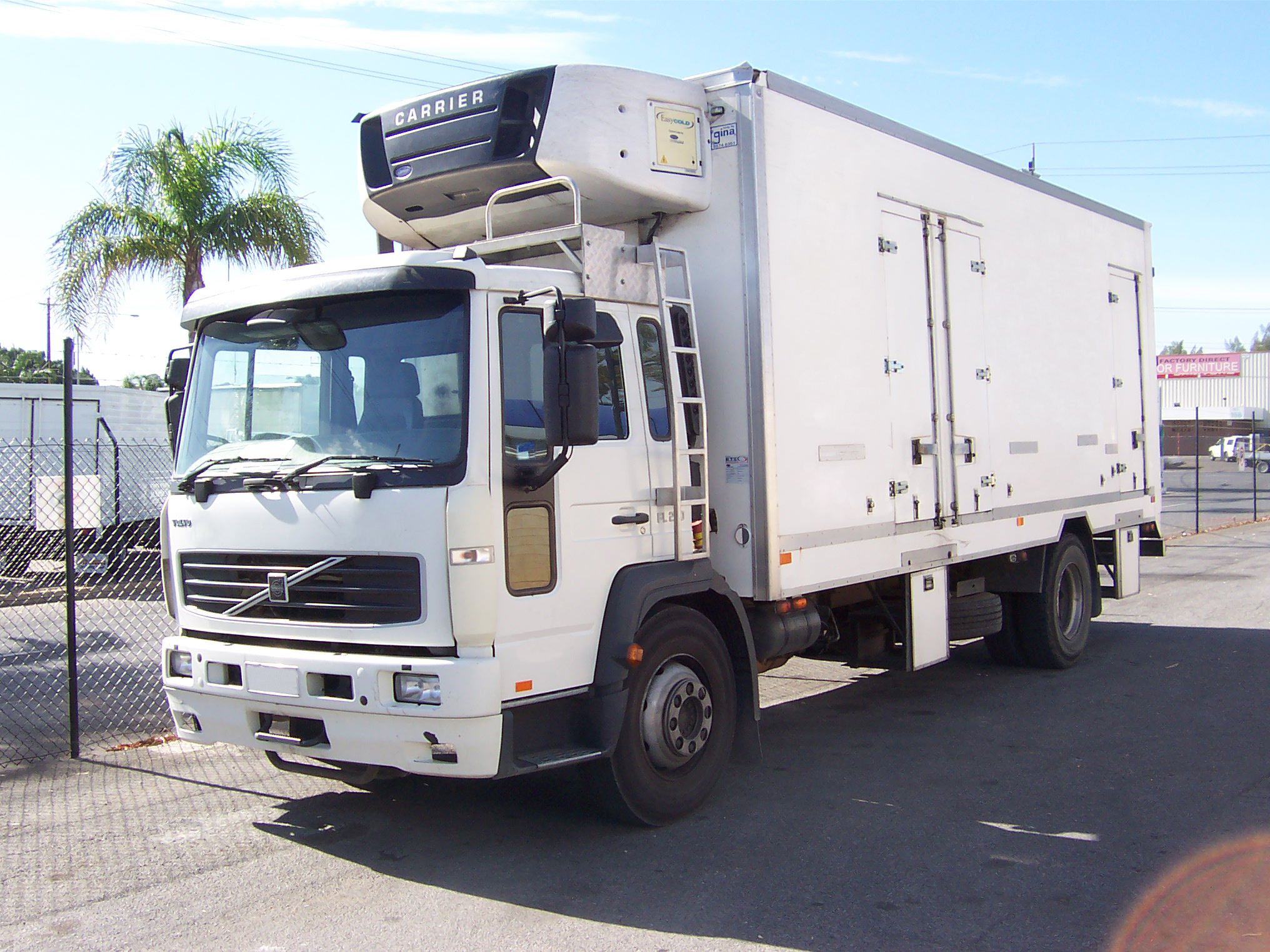
Volvo FL 250

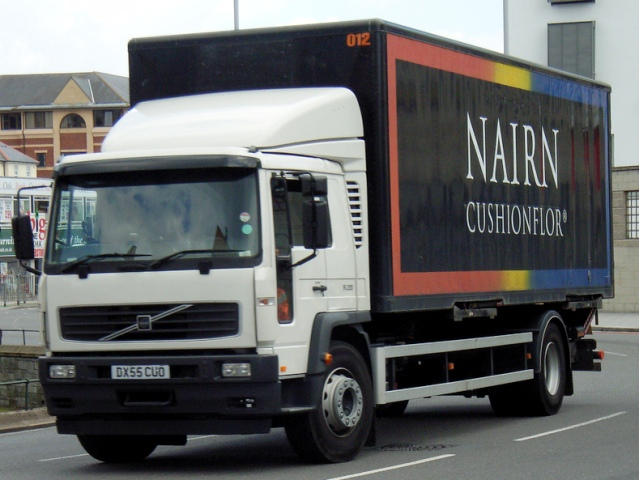
Volvo FL 4x2

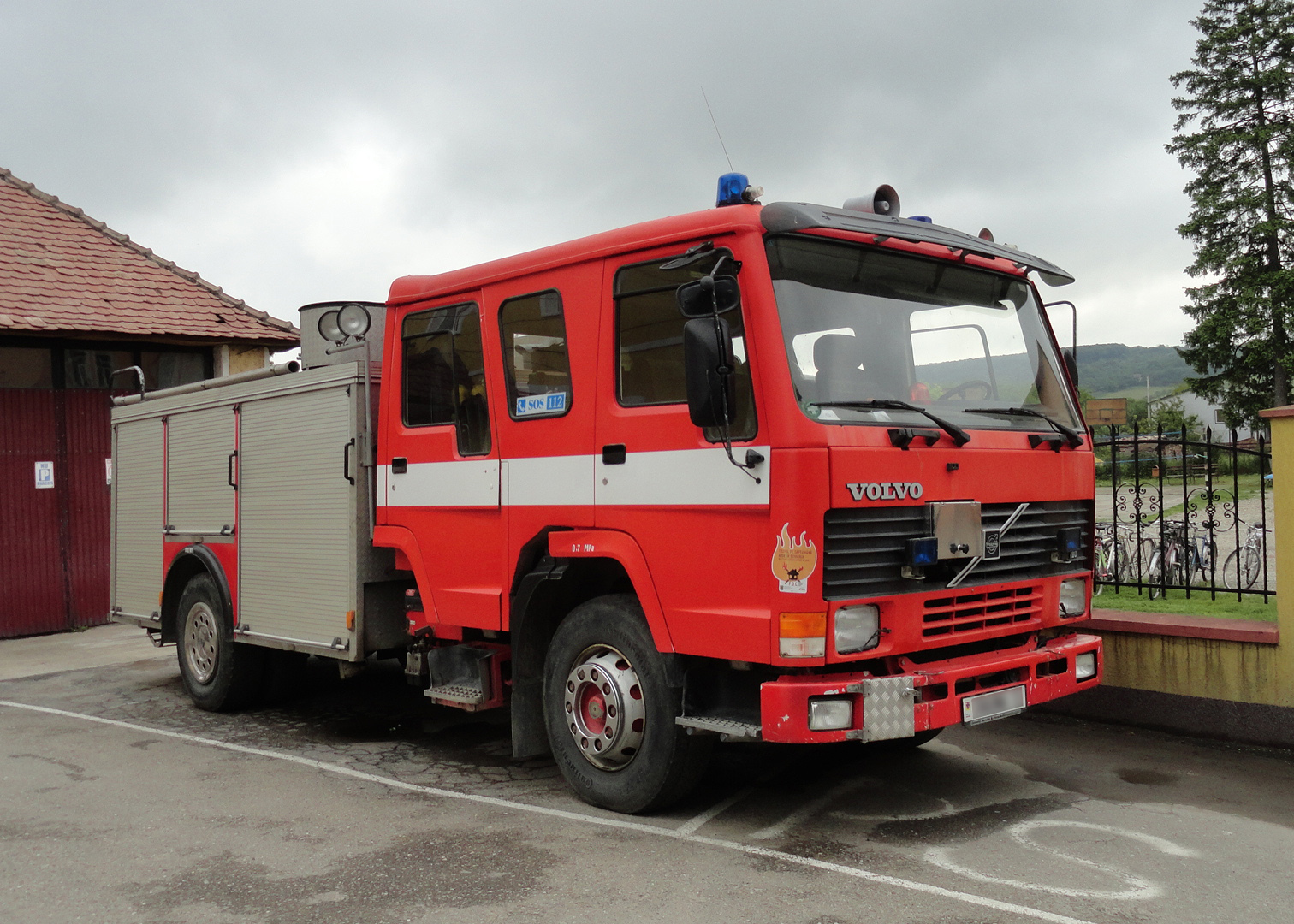
Volvo FL10 fire engine

== Second generation (2006) ==
=== Engine (D7E) ===
The 2006 Volvo FL is powered by Deutz's newly developed D7E 6-cylinder turbocharged intercooled diesel engine with a displacement of 7.2 litres.

=== Transmission ===
The 2006 Volvo FL transmission is offered as a Manual made by ZF from its Eco Mid series or Automatic by Allison. The Volvo FL is available with two overdrive manual gearboxes, one with six gears and the other with nine. The gearboxes are servo-assisted and light in operation, with a short gear lever. The lever is vibration-free and has a short throw and a very well-defined shift pattern.

The automatic transmission with its six speeds is operated smoothly and conveniently with push-buttons on the instrument panel. The automatic transmission is easy on the truck since the engine always operates within its optimum rev. range. This also results in fuel savings. Thanks to a hydraulic torque converter, the transmission provides considerable pulling power when starting off.

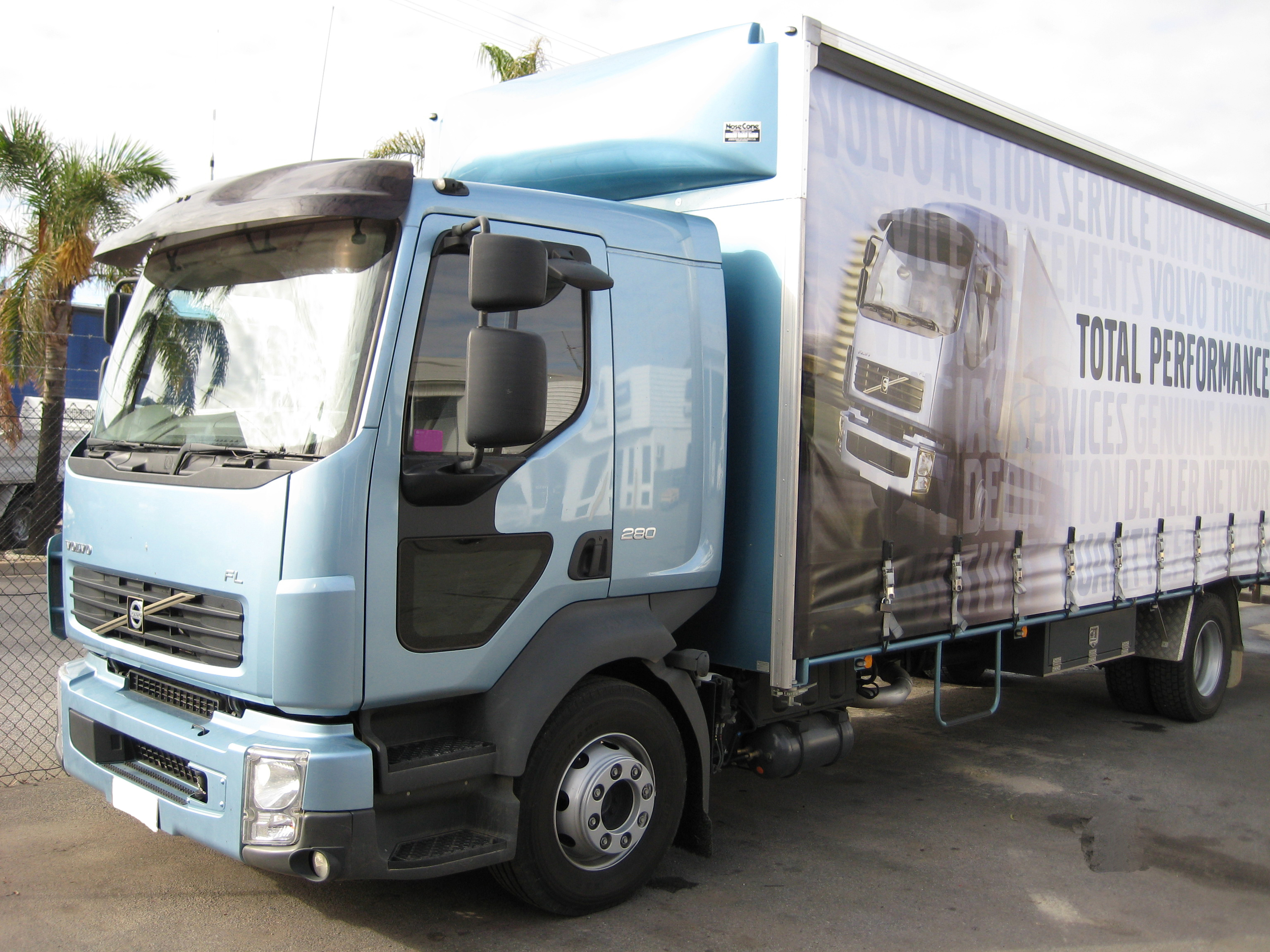
Volvo FL 280 4x2 2008 model

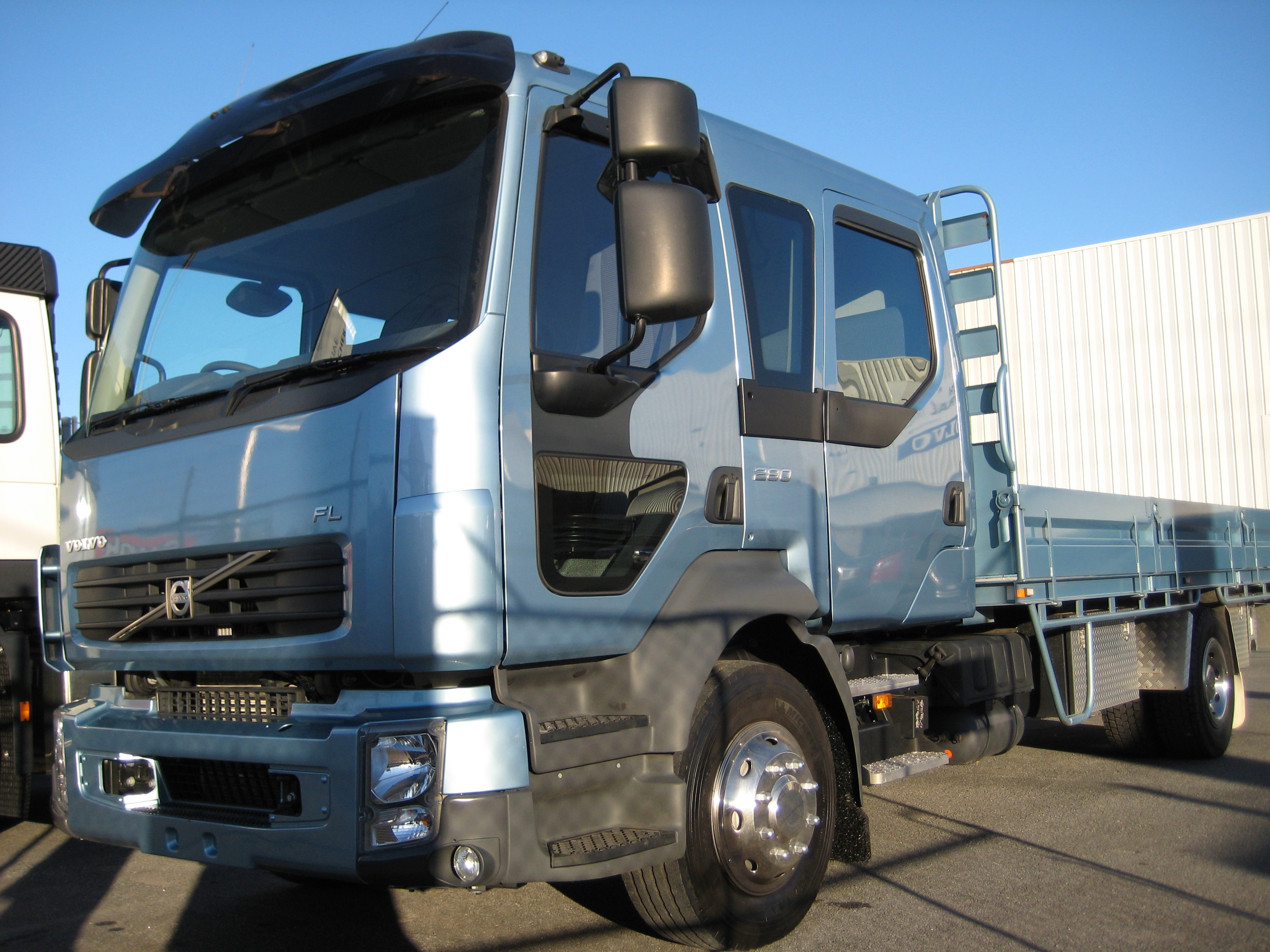
Volvo FL 4x2 Crew cab

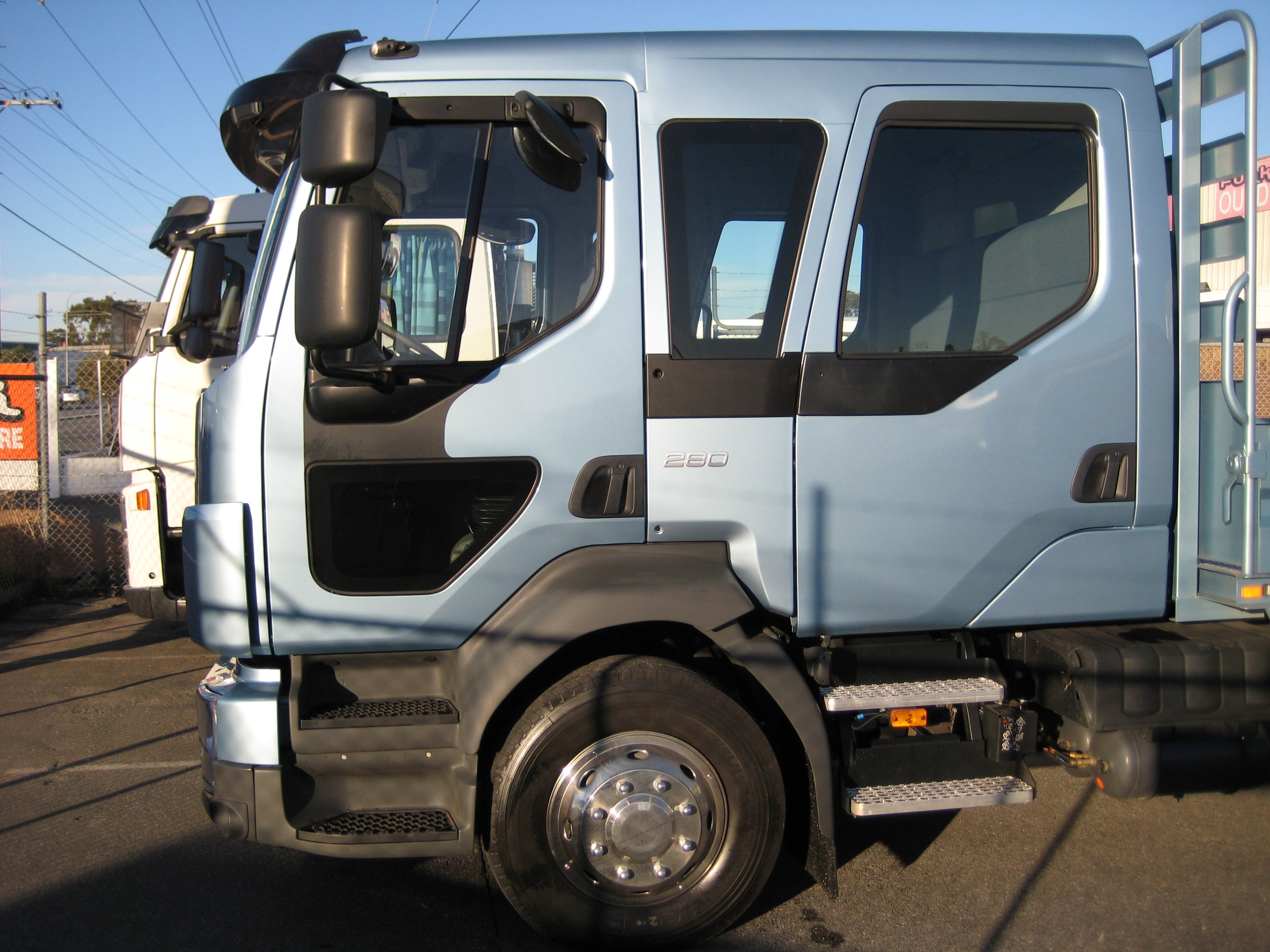
Crew cab

=== Facelift (2013) ===
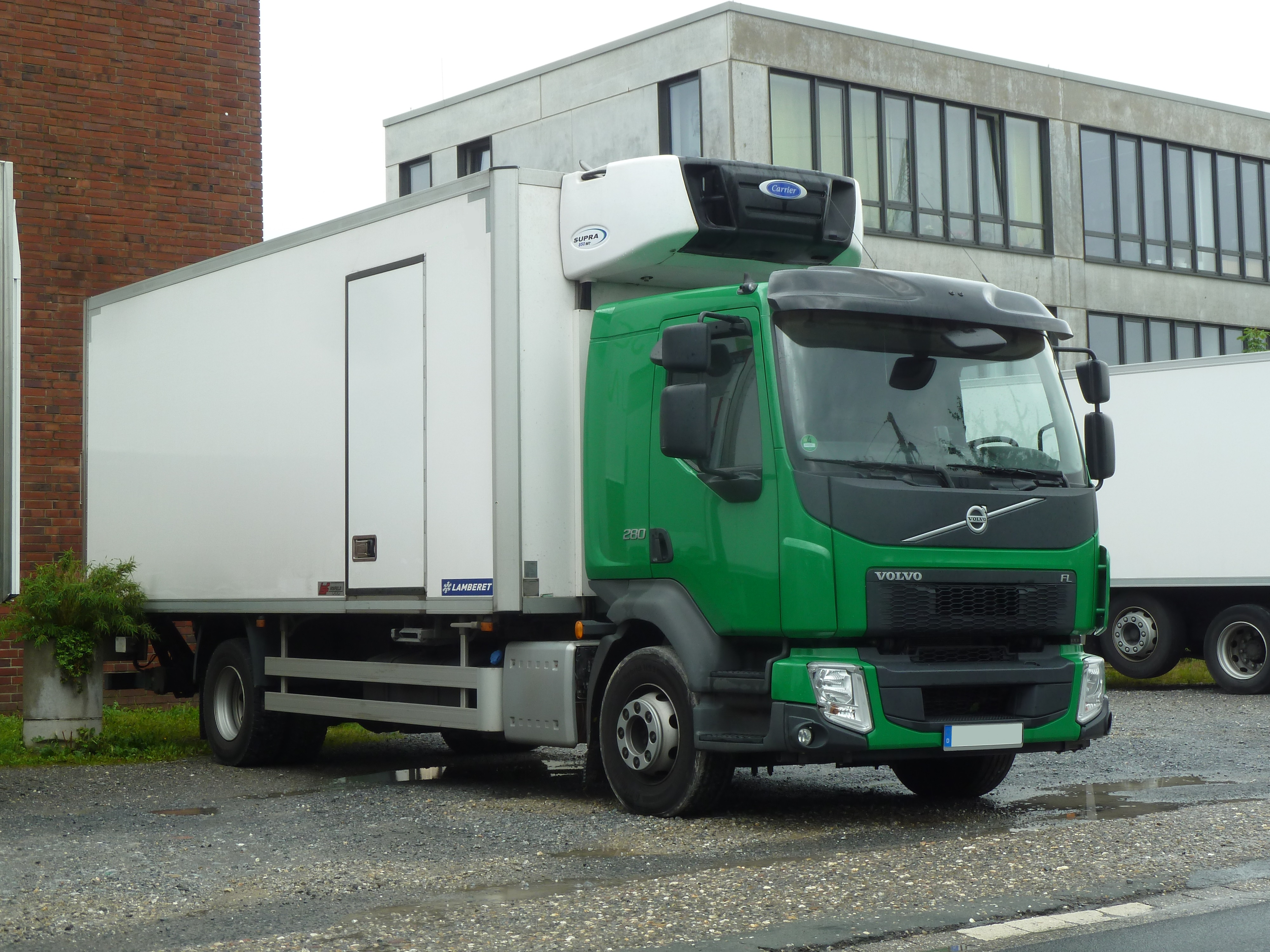
Volvo FL280 2013

The latest version of the Volvo FL was launched in May 2013. It's available with either a 6-cylinder D8 engine or a compact 4-cylinder D5 engine. The engines meet the new Euro 6 environment requirements. This was a rather thorough facelift, with a new grille and much black plastic cladding up front. The corners are also new, as is the front bumper. The interior is also improved, with particular concern for entry and exit.

As a part of the Euro 6 renewal of the FL, a 12-tonne version was also launched. It is a lighter and lower truck compared to the 2006 Volvo FL. It uses a four-cylinder D4 with 240 horsepower.

=== Safety ===
Euro NCAP test results Volvo FL 4x2 Rigid (2026)
Test	Score
Overall:	4 /5 stars
Safe driving	78%
Crash avoidance	62%
Post crash	80%

== Latin American derivative ==
A similar model made by Volvo's Brazilian branch, named Volvo VM, is similar in concept and appearance to the second generation of the Volvo FL. A major difference is the VM being only fitted with MWM-International/Maxxforce inline-6 engines, and with the option for either manual or automated-manual transmissions as standard equipment. Other variations besides the 4X2 and 6X4 include the 8X4 rigid and a 4X2 tractorhead. Cabin options are limited to daycab and sleeper, even though crew-cab third-party conversions are available in Brazil.
