= Volvo Trucks =

Swedish truck manufacturer

- Type: Division
- Industry: Automotive
- Founded: 1928
- Headquarters: Gothenburg, Sweden
- Areas served: Worldwide
- Key people: Roger Alm (President)
- Products: Heavy duty trucks
- Parent: Volvo
- Website: volvotrucks.com

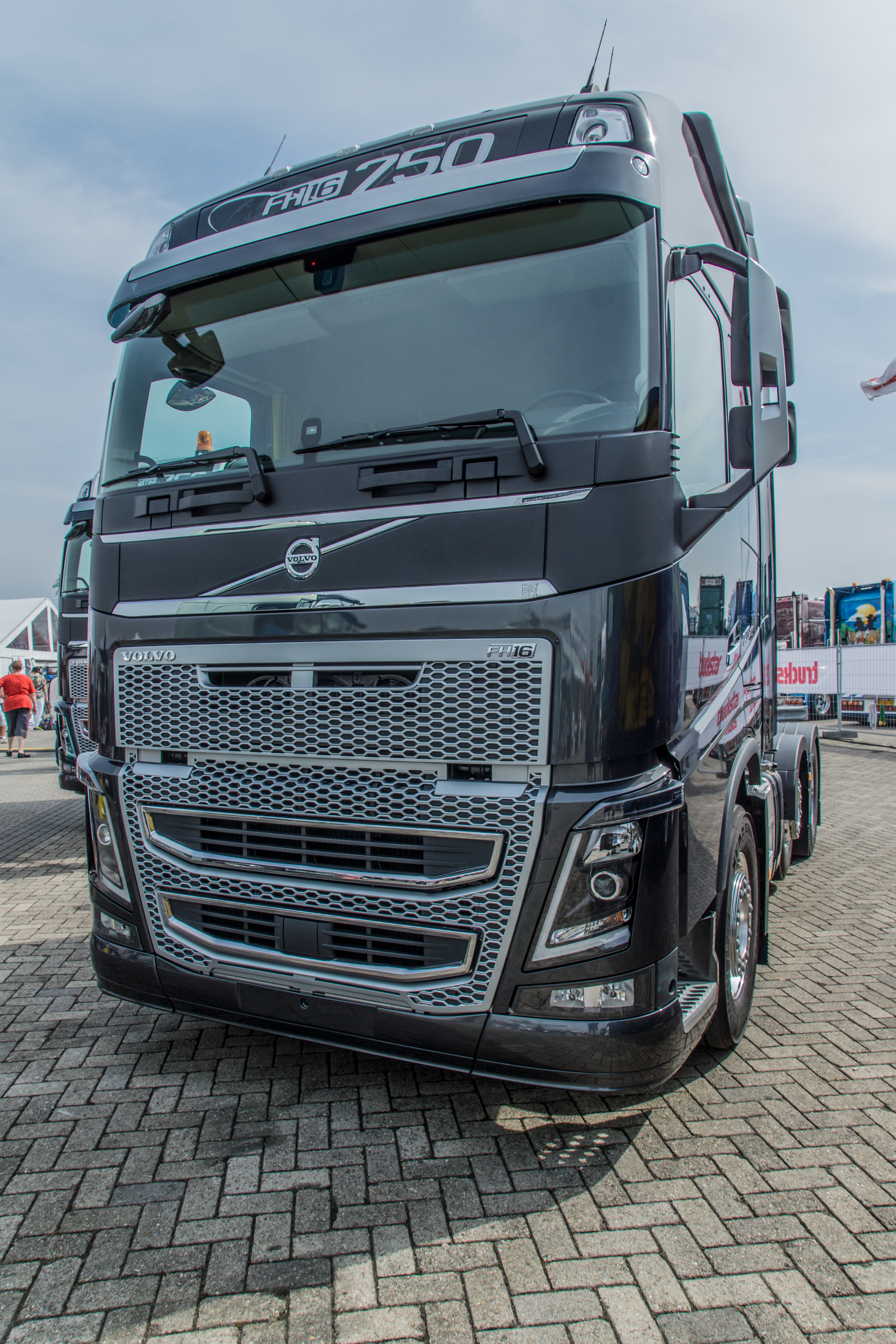
A 2013 model Volvo FH16. The Volvo FH series was introduced in 1993 and is Volvo Trucks' most commercially successful truck.

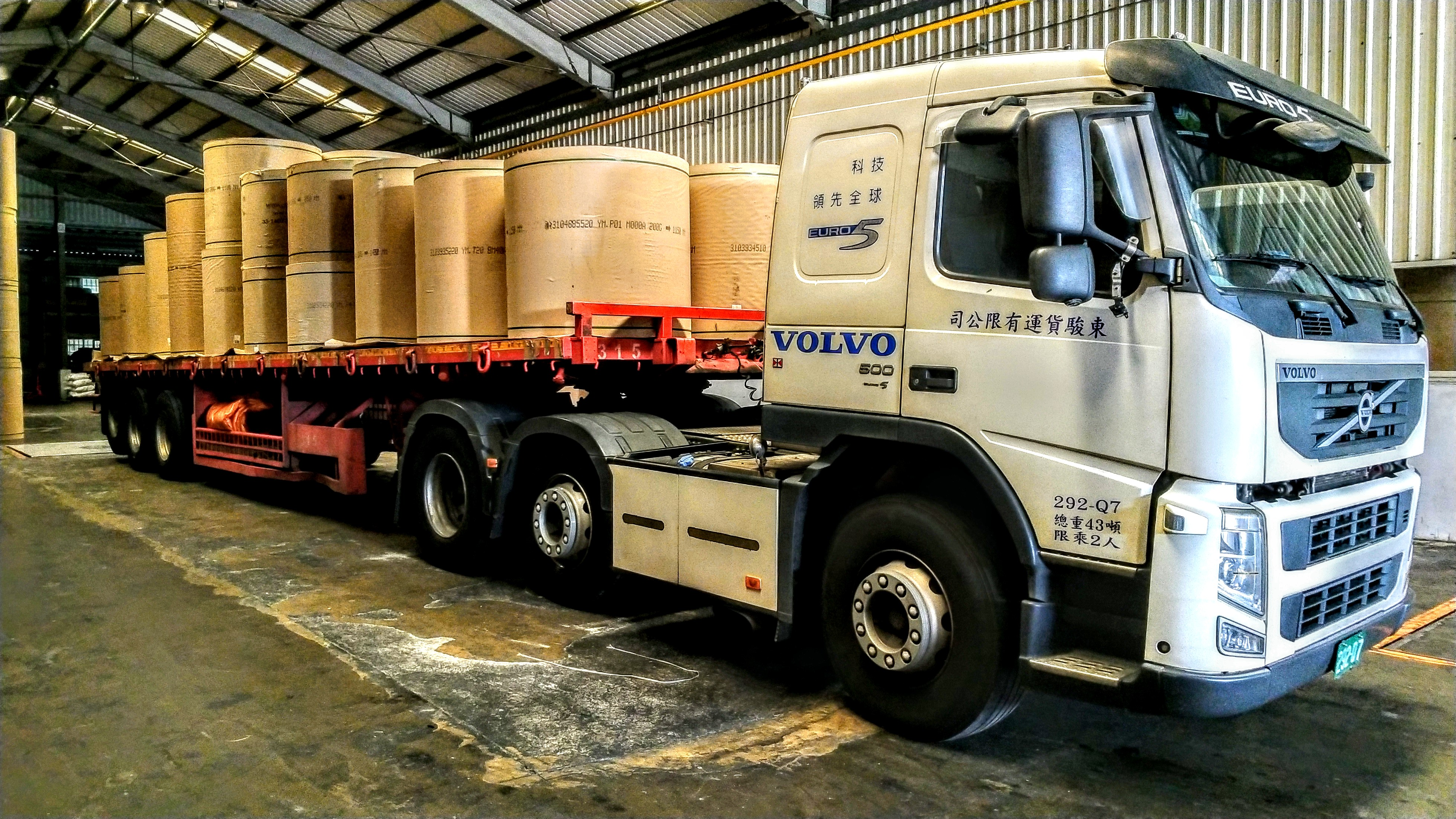
Volvo FM500 in Taiwan

Volvo Trucks (Swedish: Volvo Lastvagnar, pronounced [ˈvɔlːvʊ ˈlastˌvɑŋːnar]) is a truck manufacturing division of Volvo based in Gothenburg, Sweden.

Volvo Trucks was a separate company within Volvo. The Volvo Group was reorganised on 1 January 2012 and as a part of the process, Volvo Trucks ceased to be a separate company and was instead incorporated into Volvo Group Trucks along Volvo's other truck operations, as Renault Trucks and Mack Trucks.

The first Volvo truck rolled off the production lines in 1928, and in 2016 Volvo Trucks employed more than 52,000 people around the world. With global headquarters in Gothenburg, Sweden, Volvo manufactures and assembles its trucks in eight wholly owned assembly plants and nine factories owned by local interests. Volvo Trucks produces and sells over 190,000 units annually.

== History ==
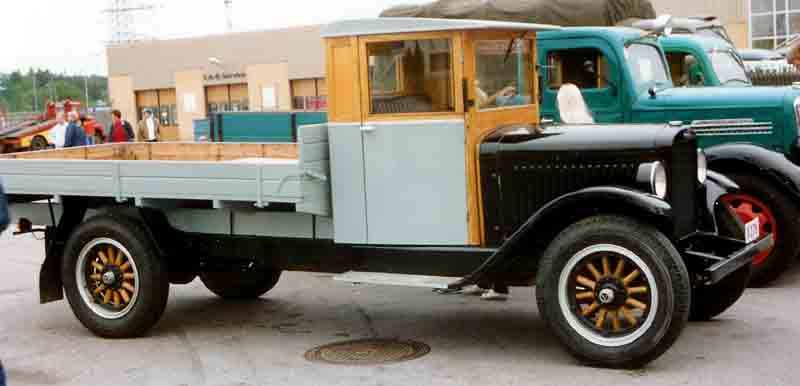
Volvo LV63 Truck 1929

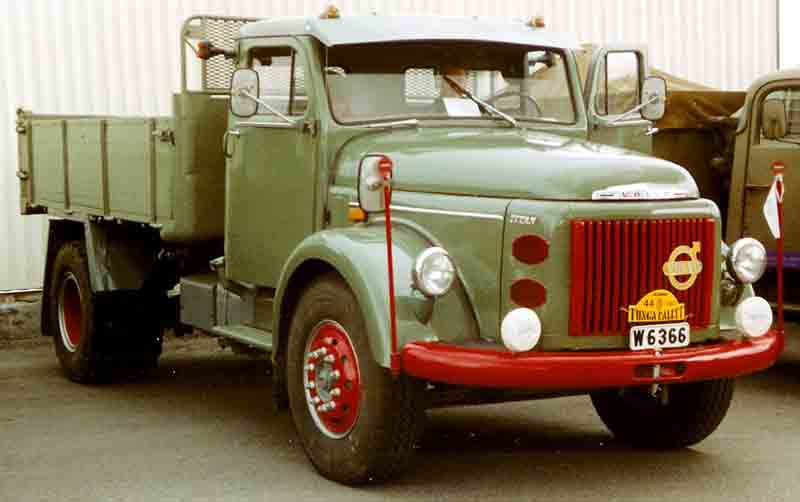
Volvo L495 Titan Truck 1965

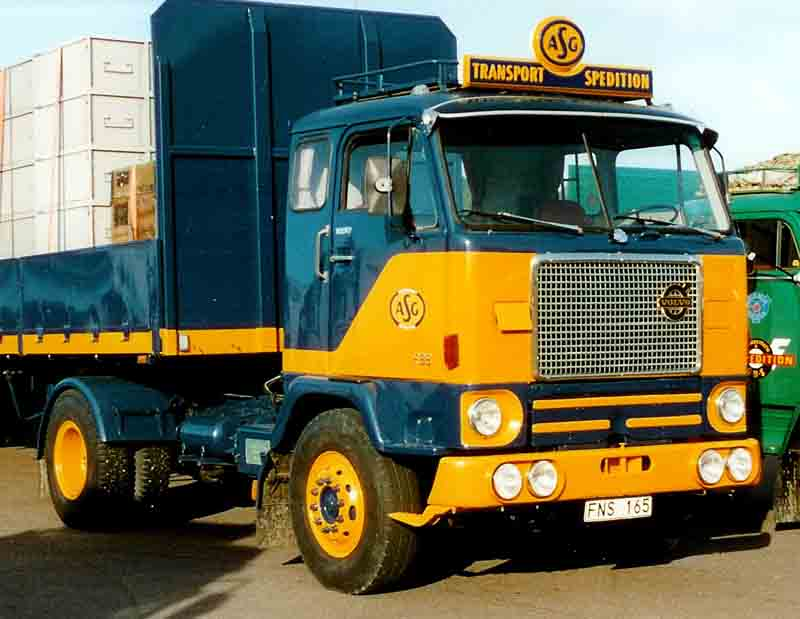
Volvo F88-49T Truck 1970

When Volvo manufactured its first vehicles in 1927, plans for the first truck was already on the drawing table. In early 1928, the LV series 1 was presented to the public. It was an immediate success and 500 units were sold before the summer. It had a 2.0 L 4-cylinder engine rated at 28 hp (21 kW).

== Volvo Trucks worldwide ==
Volvo cabs are manufactured in the north of Sweden in Umeå and in Ghent, Belgium, while the engines are made in the central town of Skövde. Among some smaller facilities, Volvo has assembly plants in Sweden (Gothenburg – also the Head Office), Belgium, USA, Brazil, South Africa, Australia, China and India. Some of the smaller factories are jointly owned. Its main parts distribution centre is located in Ghent, Belgium. The sales side, with their corresponding offices and dealers, is split into seven sales areas – Latin America, North America, Europe North, Europe South, Africa/Middle East, and Asia/Oceania.

=== Production facilities ===
Plants where Volvo trucks are manufactured:

- New River Valley, Dublin, Virginia, USA
- Curitiba, Brazil
- Umeå, Sweden
- Gothenburg, Sweden
- Ghent, Belgium
- Durban, South Africa
- Bangalore, India
- Bangkok, Thailand
- Brisbane, Australia

=== North America ===
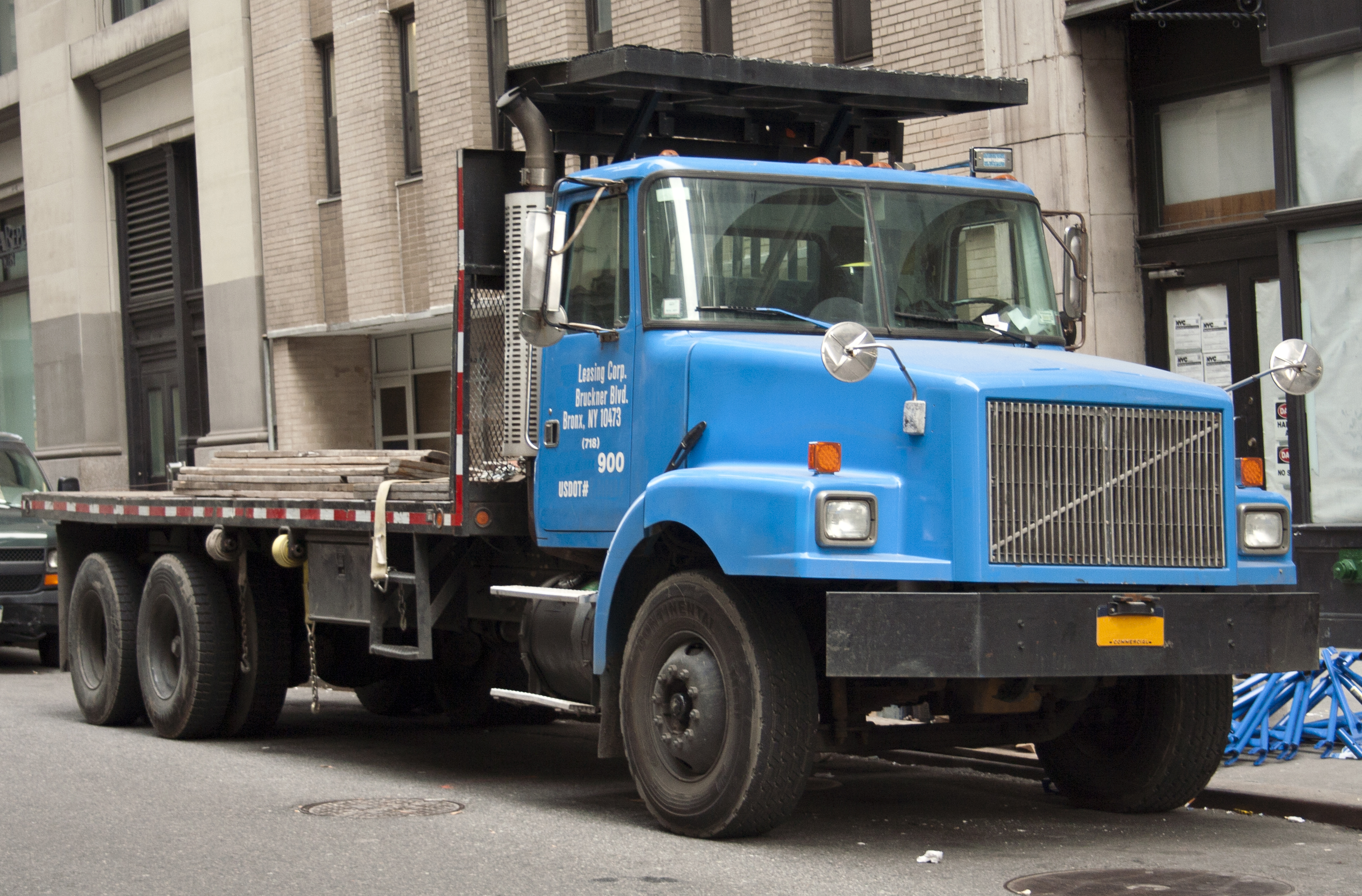
1995 Volvo WG, the first year that this old White GMC truck was marketed as a Volvo

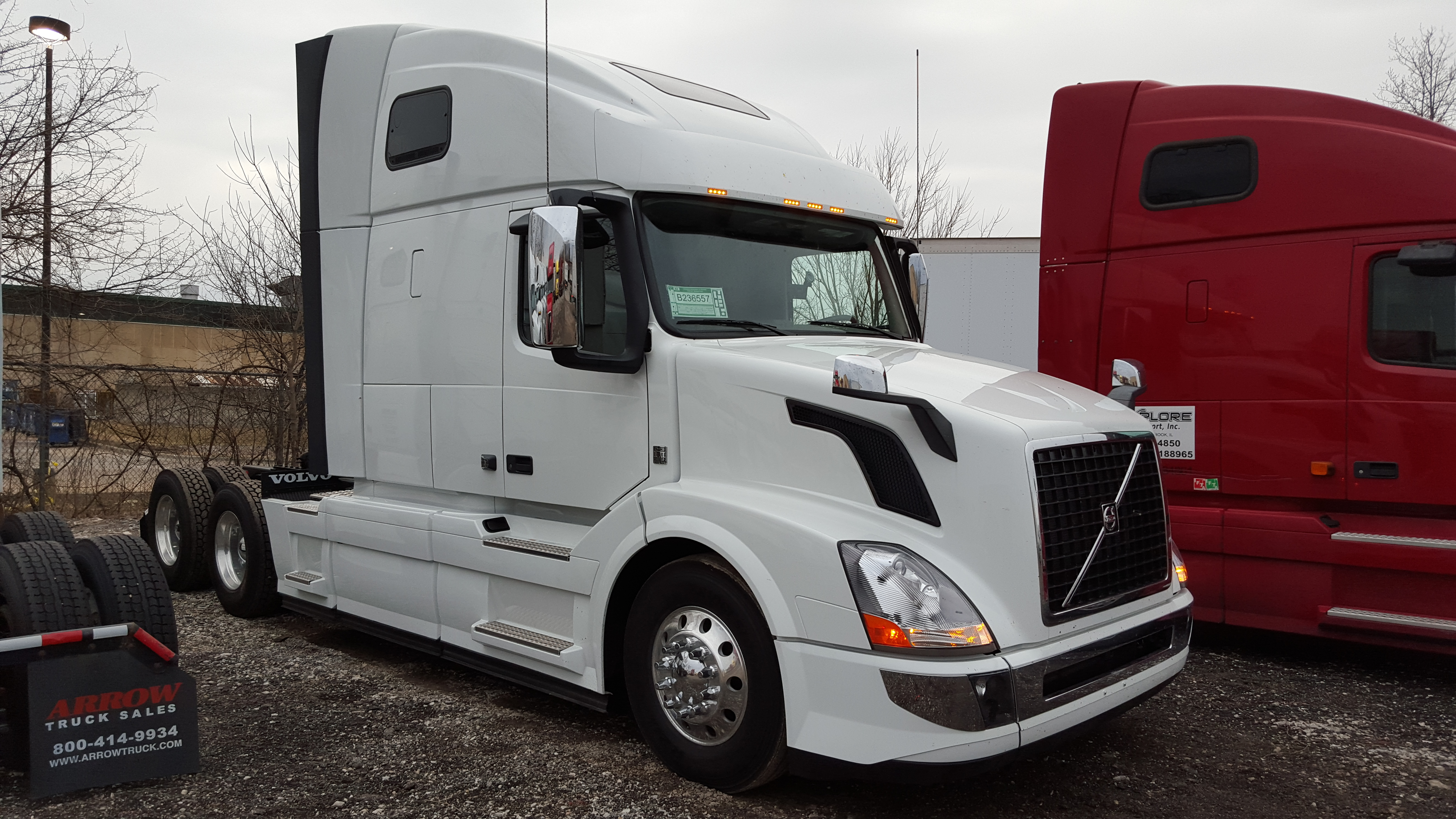
2016 Volvo VNL 670

In 1981, AB Volvo acquired the assets of White Trucks, forming Volvo White Truck Corporation in Greensboro, North Carolina. As part of the acquisition, Volvo acquired the White, Autocar, and the dormant Sterling brands; the Canadian Western Star truck brand was spun off into an independent company. Alongside the truck assets of White, Volvo acquired a nationwide distribution network (as White had served as the distributor of Freightliner until 1977). Prior to the acquisition, White's products included the White Road Boss conventional, the White Road Commander 2 (COE), the Road Xpeditor 2 (low-COE), the Autocar A-series (tractors with extensive use of aluminium), Autocar DC-series (heavy-duty/severe service), the Autocar Construcktor 2 (heavy-duty/severe-service with a White cab), and Western Star conventional/COE trucks. White also operated plants in Utah, Ohio, and Virginia.

Following the 1981 acquisition, Volvo upgraded the designs of White and Autocar product lines. In 1982, the White Integral Sleeper was introduced, joining the sleeper and passenger cab seamlessly. In 1983, the Road Boss was replaced by the White Conventional; while retaining the same cab, the hoodline was lowered with a redesigned grille. In 1985, the Integral Tall Sleeper was developed (the "Globetrotter" sleeper of America) as a raised-roof variant of the Integral Sleeper. In 1987, the White 'Aero' truck was introduced, adopting a lowered hoodline, composite headlamps (shared with the Volvo 240), and a flush-mounted grille. In 1988, the WG was introduced, marking the return of a short-hood conventional. The Autocar DK severe-duty line was launched in 1983 and supplemented by the widely admired Autocar AT64F long-haul tractor. In 1988, the DK was replaced by the Autocar ACL and ACM models. While the AC-series trucks were tough and reliable, they incorporated a number of Volvo components and, for some Autocar loyalists, marked a dilution of the Autocar brand.

In 1986, Volvo commenced sales of trucks under its own brand in North America, introducing the FE-series low-cab COEs. While Western Star was spun off in 1981, its cabover model line continued to be produced by White and rebadged as a Western Star.

On 16 August 1986, General Motors announced the formation of a joint venture with AB Volvo, with the latter holding an 85% stake. Named Volvo GM Heavy Truck Corporation, Volvo would take responsibility for development, design, and production of heavy trucks of the joint venture, named WhiteGMC. All General Motors heavy product lines were discontinued (with the exception of the GMC Brigadier, ending production as a WhiteGMC in 1988); the joint venture rebadged the White product line as WhiteGMCs while Autocars remained in production. In 1995, Volvo GM ended the use of the WhiteGMC name, with all non-Autocar models adopting the Volvo name. In 1997, Volvo AB purchased the rest of its stake in Volvo GM, renaming it Volvo Trucks North America.

In 1996, Volvo released the Volvo VN-series, the first Volvo truck developed outside of White or General Motors. Designed specifically for North America, the VN was more aerodynamic than its WIA predecessor. The previous-generation WG remained in production, with Autocar dropped as a separate brand name, becoming a sub-model of Volvo severe-service trucks.

On 25 April 2000, Volvo acquired Renault Véhicules Industriels through a merger, making it the owner of Mack Trucks. Following the merger, Volvo became the largest European truck manufacturer and the second-largest truck manufacturer in the world. To secure approval of the merger (by avoiding potential antitrust issues), Volvo agreed to divest its low-cabover range (known as the Xpeditor); alongside the Mack MR/LE, the two vehicles held a predominant share of the refuse market.

In 2006, Volvo purchased a 13% shareholding in Nissan Diesel with an option to acquire Nissan's remaining 6%. In 2007, Volvo increased it shareholding to 96%. Alongside the Xpeditor product range, the Autocar trademark was sold in 2001 to Grand Vehicle Works LLC, a Chicago-based private holding company that owned body manufacturer Union City Body Company (founded in 1898) and Workhorse Custom Chassis. Shortly before Autocar was acquired by GVW Group, Autocar conventionals were retired.

In 2000, Volvo introduced the VHD severe-service conventional, largely as a replacement for Autocar conventional vehicles. While using the cab of the VN, the VHD used a heavier-duty chassis and suspension, along with sealed-beam headlamps. In 2002, the second-generation VN, the VNL, was introduced.

In 2009, Volvo began to relocate the operations of its Mack Trucks subsidiary to Greensboro, where the North American operations of Volvo Trucks have been headquartered. Today, Volvo produces Class 8 Volvo trucks at its Dublin, Virginia plant and Class 8 Mack truck models in Macungie, Pennsylvania. Affiliate Volvo Powertrain produces engines and transmissions at its Hagerstown, Maryland, facility, for use exclusively in the North American market.

The Volvo Trucks North America Dublin plant began manufacturing a battery-powered VNR Electric truck model starting in early 2021. It was the largest Volvo truck plant in the world, employing close to 3,000 people building multiple models of heavy-duty trucks. On 20 June 2022, Volvo announced that "in the second part of this decade" it would begin making trucks using hydrogen fuel cells with a range of 600 miles, compared to 275 miles for the existing VNR trucks.

In May 2024, Volvo Trucks North America announced a partnership with Aurora Innovation on the Volvo VNL Autonomous at ACT Expo. The VNL is a Class 8 truck equipped with Aurora Driver for autonomous commercial freight operations.

In September 2024, Volvo Trucks announced a long-range variant of its FH Electric truck, capable of covering up to 600 km on a single charge. It is expected to arrive on the market in the second half of 2025.

=== China ===
AB Volvo struck a deal in August 2021 to buy a heavy duty truck subsidiary of Jiangling Motors Corp (JMC) for about $125.7 million to make trucks in the world's biggest vehicle market. The acquired business includes a manufacturing site in China's northern city of Taiyuan. Volvo aims to start production of its new heavy duty Volvo FH, Volvo FM and Volvo FMX trucks there at the end of 2022.

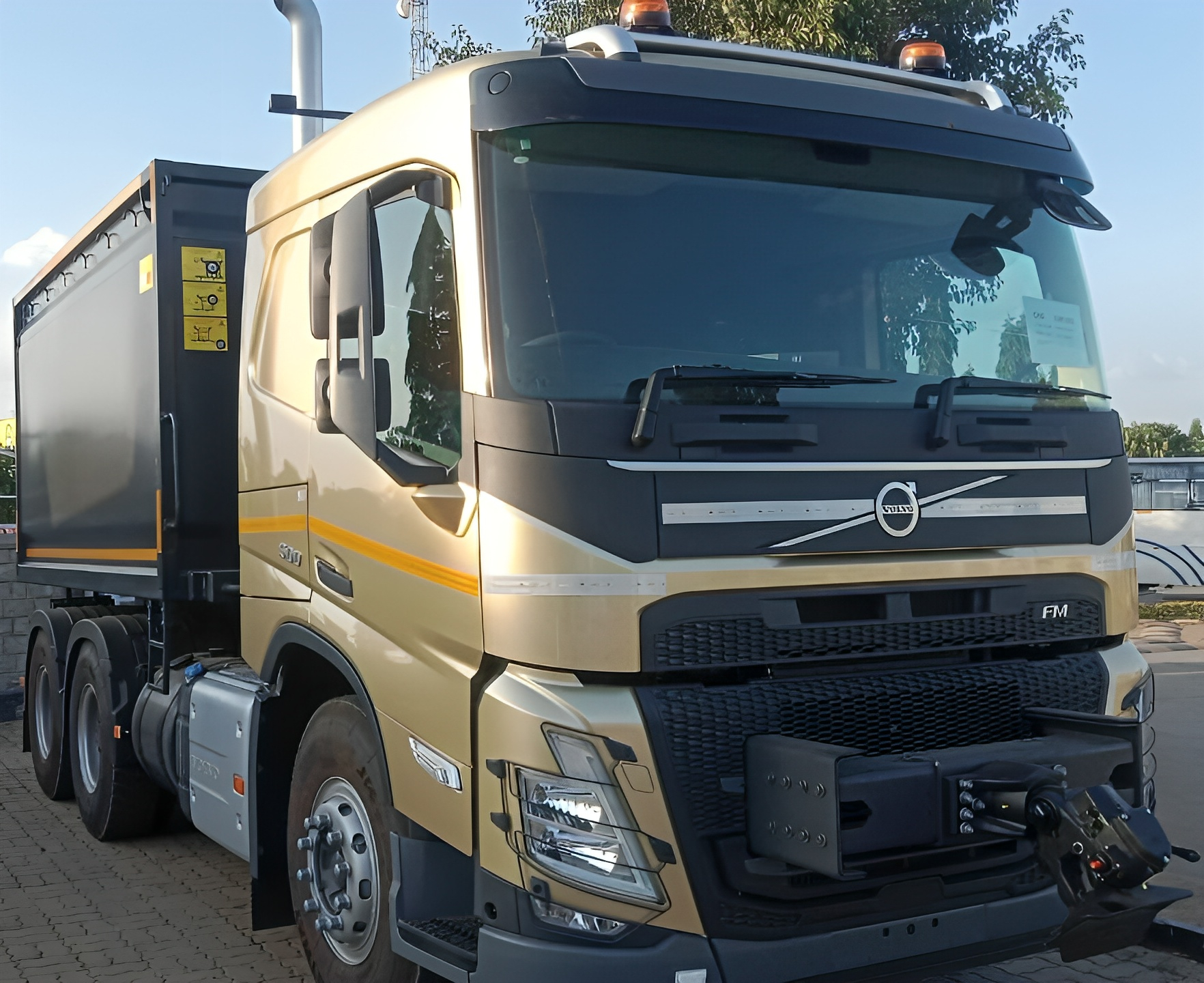
2024 Volvo FM500 6x4 Puller Ballast Tractor with factory fitted ballast box and drawbar coupling in Hoskote, Bengaluru, India.

=== India ===
Volvo trucks set foot in Indian HCV market as a wholly owned subsidiary of Volvo Group with its FH12 tractor truck also the first ever Volvo truck produced in India at Hoskote plant in Karnataka state of India. Later on the company induced FM7 tippers for construction and mining segment which were well received. In 2002 company introduced FH and FM lineup for the region in various configurations and specifications. Later in 2008 Volvo Group and Eicher motors an Indian automotive group known for producing commercial vehicles and motorcycles came together to form a new company VE Commercial Vehicles (VECV) with 50% share in the newly formed company. All future offering of volvo trucks came under the wing of VECV since then. Today's volvo trucks lineup consist of FM available in tipper, tractor truck, ballast tractor variants and FMX available in tipper variant only.

=== Export markets ===
Volvo Trucks are exported to and sold by more than 1,800 dealers in more than 75 countries.

== Failed entry to Argentine market ==
Volvo tried to settle in Argentina on two different occasions: the first, in 1959 would be carried out in partnership with the local company Conarg. The truck production was a failure, but some models of motor graders with Volvo engine was made by Conarg (under licence of Bolinder Munktell). The second, in 1972, Volvo Sudamericana SACI elevated to the consideration of the highest authority of the Ministry of Industry and Mining its project of installation of an industrial complex, consisting of an automotive terminal plant for chassis of heavy trucks with cab and chassis for long-distance buses; a plant for trailers and a third plant for coaches. Eventually, Volvo lost the tender, which was in the hands of Scania.

== Focus on alternative fuels ==
Volvo is currently focusing on such alternative fuels such as HVO, (Bio-)DME, LNG and methane.

== Volvo product range ==
As a part of adapting to the new European Union Euro 6 engine environment requirements, Volvo Trucks renewed their truck range in 2012 and 2013. The biggest launch was the new Volvo FH in September 2012 The rest of the range were renewed in the spring of 2013.

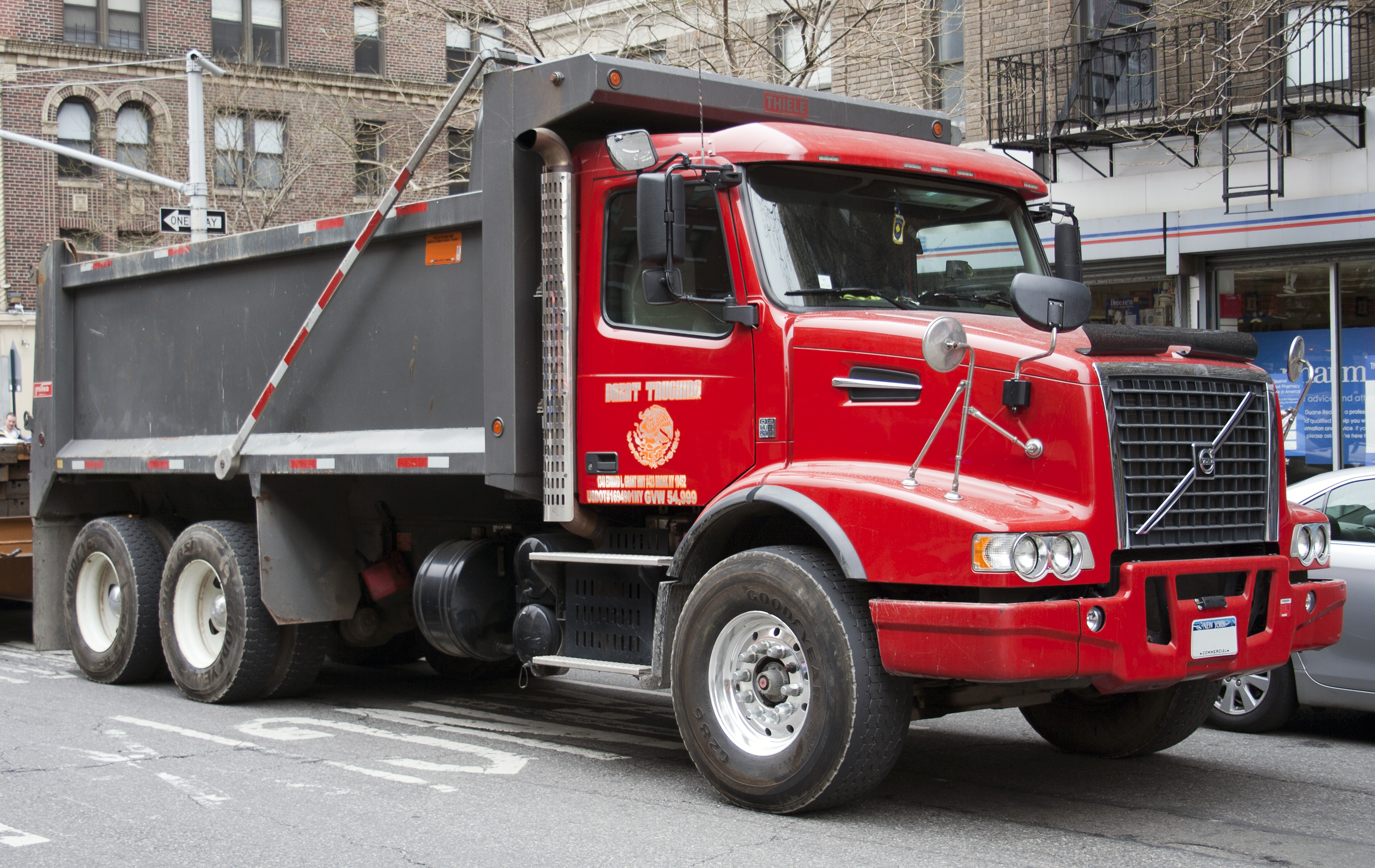
Volvo VHD dump truck (US)

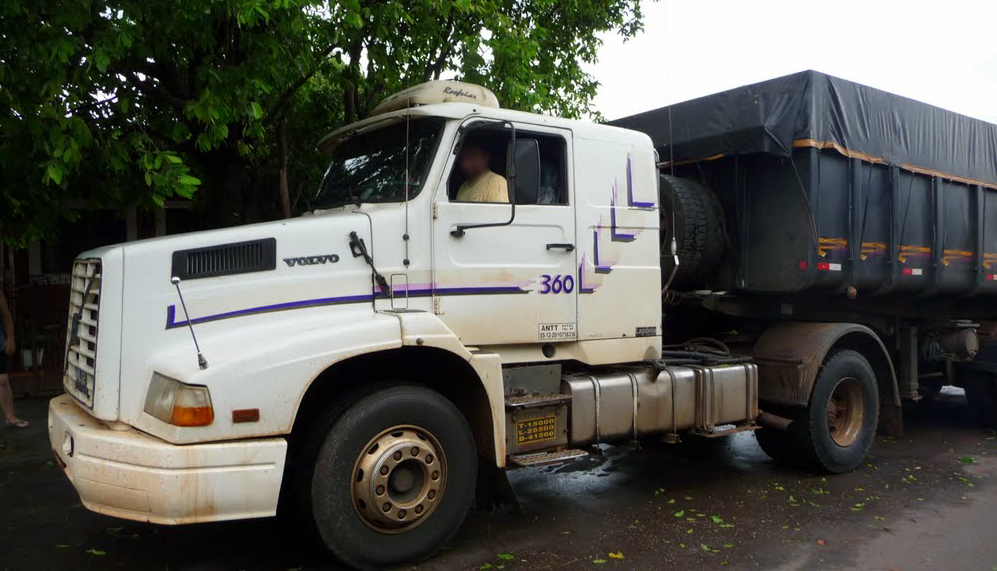
Volvo NL12 tractor truck in Porto Alegre, Brazil

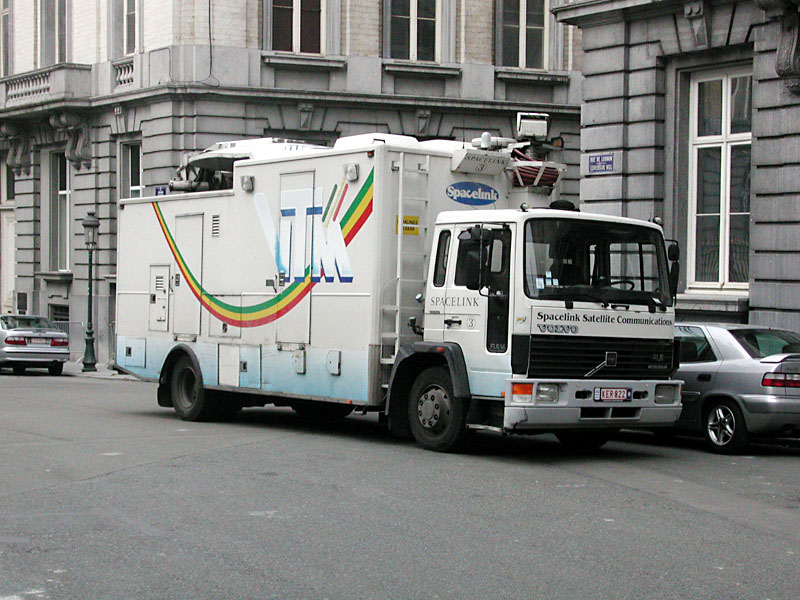
Volvo FL 6 from the mid-1990s

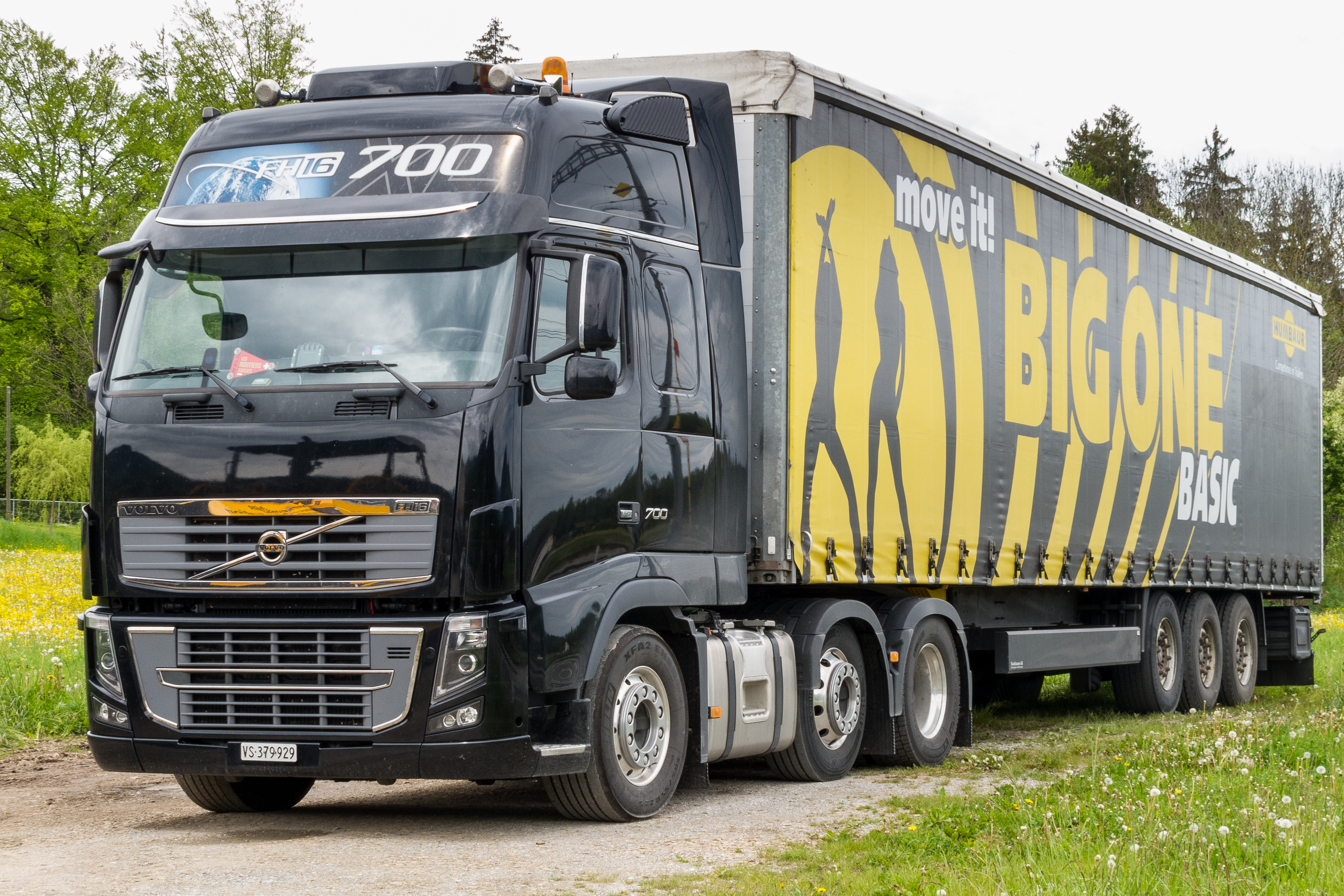
Volvo FH16 700

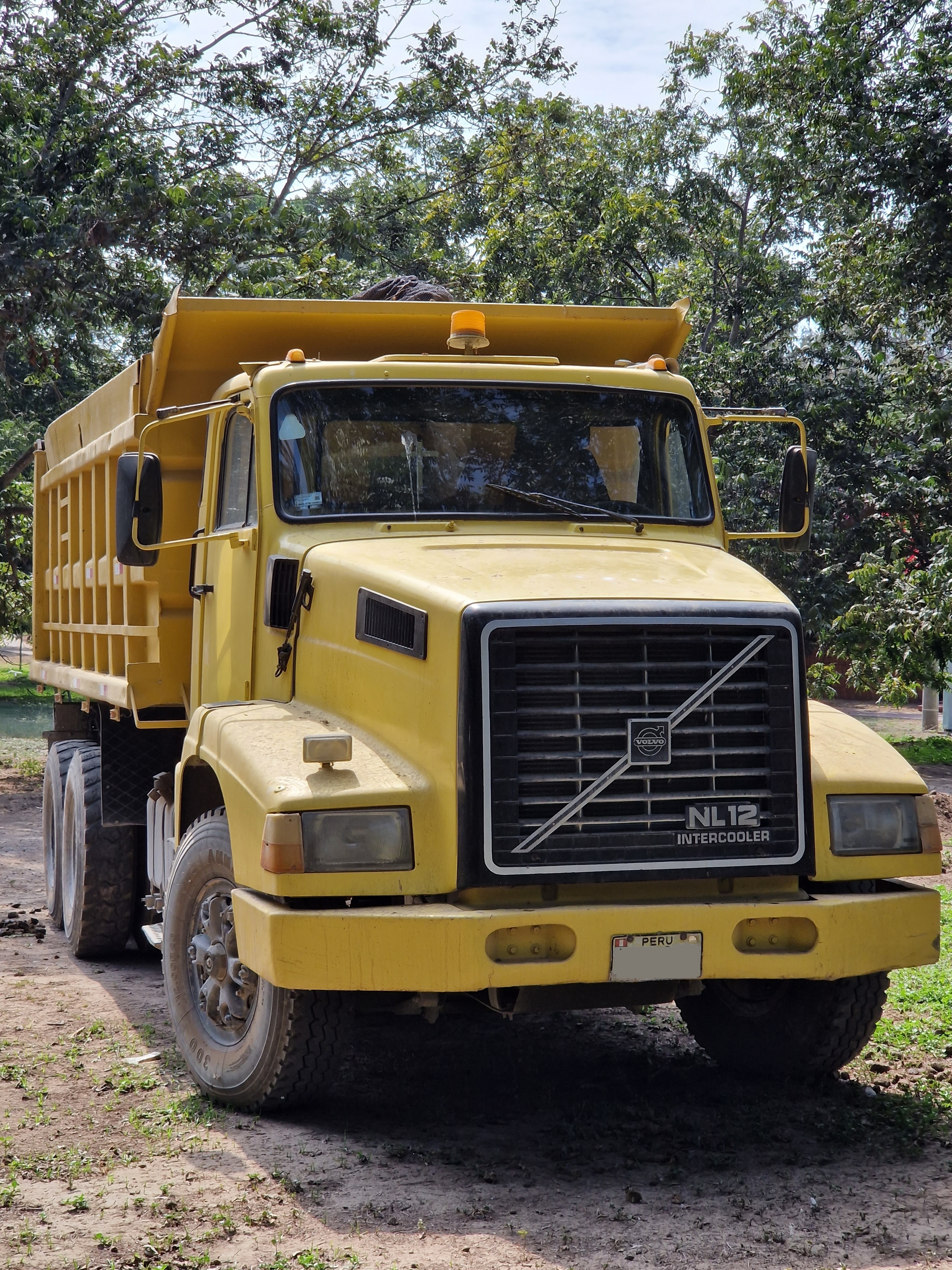
Volvo NL12 dump truck in Peru

=== Product line-up ===
As of 2013, Volvo Trucks products are:

- Volvo FL
  - markets – Europe, Middle East
- Volvo FE
  - markets – Europe, Middle East, Australia
- Volvo FM, classic and new (launched April 2013)
  - markets – Europe, Africa, Asia, South America, Oceania
- Volvo FH, classic and new (launched September 2012)
  - markets – Europe, Africa, Asia, South America, Oceania
- Volvo FH16, classic and new (launched September 2012)
  - markets – Europe, Africa, Asia, South America, Oceania
- Volvo FMX, classic and new (launched April 2013)
  - markets – Europe, Africa, Asia, South America, Oceania
- Volvo VHD
  - markets – North America, Mexico
- Volvo VNL
  - markets – North America, Mexico
- Volvo VNM
  - markets – North America, Mexico
- Volvo VNR
  - markets – North America, Mexico
- Volvo VNX (announced March 2013)
  - markets – North America
- Volvo VM
  - markets – South America

=== Past products ===
==== 1920s ====
- LV4
- LV60-series

==== 1930s ====
- LV66-series
- LV71-series
- LV76-series
- LV81-series
- The "Longnose"
- The "Sharpnose"
- TVA and TVB

==== 1940s ====
- L29C & V
- LV11
- LV15 & LV24
- The "Roundnose"
- TVC

==== 1950s ====
- L34
- L36 and L37 Brage
- L38 and L48 Viking
- The "Laplander"
- TL11, TL12 and TL22
- TL31
- L42 Snabbe & L43 Trygge
- L39 and L49 Titan

==== 1960s ====
- F82/F83
- L47 Raske
- F84
- F85/F86
- F88/G88
- N86
- N88

==== 1970s ====
- C3
- F10 and F12
- F4 and F6
- F6S
- F7
- F82S/F83S
- F89/G89
- Globetrotter
- N7, N10 and N12

==== 1980s ====
- CH230
- White
- FL4 and FL6
- FL7 and FL10
- FS10
- F10, F12 and F16
- Volvo NL10 and NL12
- N12
- FE6 & FE7 (North America)

==== 1990s ====
- FS7
- FH12 and FH16
- FL12
- ECT and FL6 Hybrid
- VN and NH
- FLC
- FM7, FM10 and FM12

==== 2000s ====
- FH12 and FH16
- Volvo 80th Anniversary FH & FH16
- Volvo VN and NH
- Volvo FM9 and FM12
- Volvo FL6
- Volvo VT (based on the VN)
- Volvo VHD

== Marketing ==
=== Sponsorships ===
In Formula One, Volvo Trucks sponsored the British team McLaren from the 2016 to the 2021 seasons. As part of their agreement, McLaren was supplied with Volvo FH trucks.

=== Commercials ===
Volvo Trucks has released the Live Test series of commercials, which included The Epic Split.

== See also ==
- Autocar Company, former Volvo truck business
- Dynafleet, transport information system
