= White Road Commander =

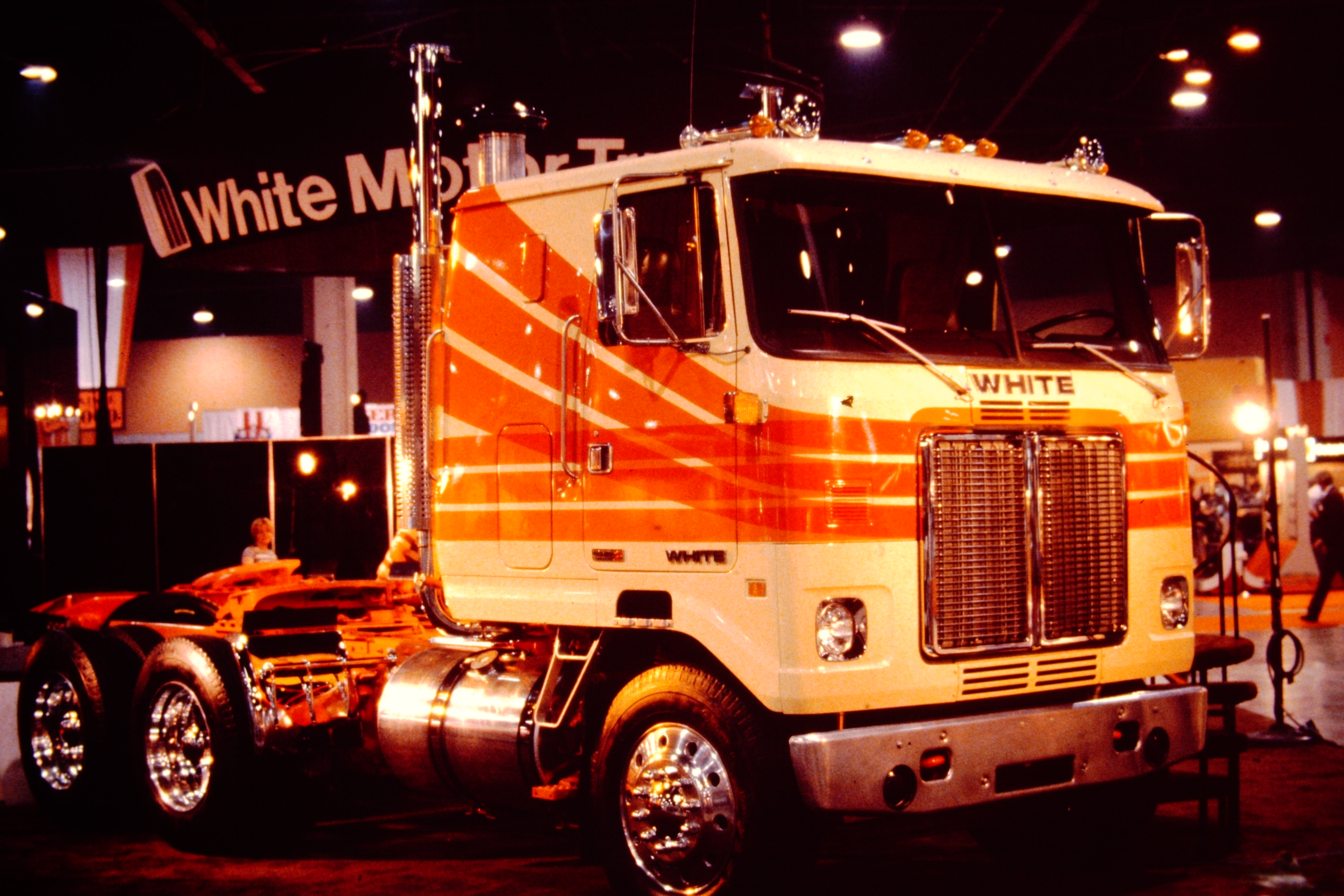
- 1979 model year White Road Commander 2

Overview
- Manufacturer: White Motor Corporation, later Volvo Trucks
- Also called: White High Cabover; Western Star Cabover
- Production: 1972-1983; New River Valley, VA

Body and chassis
- Class: Class 7-8
- Body style: Cabover truck
- Layout: 4x2, 6X4

Powertrain
- Engine: Cummins NTC; Detroit Diesel 8V71; Detroit Diesel 8V92; Detroit Diesel 6V92; Caterpillar 3406
- Transmission: Eaton-Fuller RT-910; Eaton Fuller R—915; Eaton-Fuller RTO-9513; Eaton-Fuller RTO-12513; Eaton-Fuller RTO-12515; Eaton-Fuller RT-11609; Allison HT-Series

Chronology
- Predecessor: GMC Astro

The White Road Commander was a series of heavy-duty cab-over trucks built by the White Motor Corporation and later Volvo Trucks from 1972 until 1983. Then the model was sold as the White High Cabover.

== Design ==
In 1975 the modernized Road Commander 2 was introduced, with a split wraparound windshield and redesigned cabin using the "tapered" doors seen across the White lineup (many "2" version Autocars, and other classic White-owned Autocar and Western Star trucks sharing the White classic cab). Originally fitted with single round headlights, in the 1980s twin rectangular units also became available.

The Road Commander 2 has a bolted frame made of high tensile steel, while the all-aluminum cabin is hydraulically tilted. This allows access to a wide range of available diesel engines from Cummins, Caterpillar, and other manufacturers. The available range in 1977 was from 190 to 450 hp (142 to 336 kW). An unusual feature for the time was the RC2's pull-out drawer containing all electrical fuses and connections, located inside the cab.

The later White High Cabover was available in WHS ("White High-cab Short"), WHL ("White High-cab Long"), WHE ("Extended") and WHM ("Medium") versions.

After the White nameplate was combined with that of GMC in 1988 the design continued to be built as a White GMC.

== Foreign sales ==
The RC2 was also sold in many export markets, as such models met all period EEC and ECE regulations. It was sold in several European markets such as Switzerland and the United Kingdom.

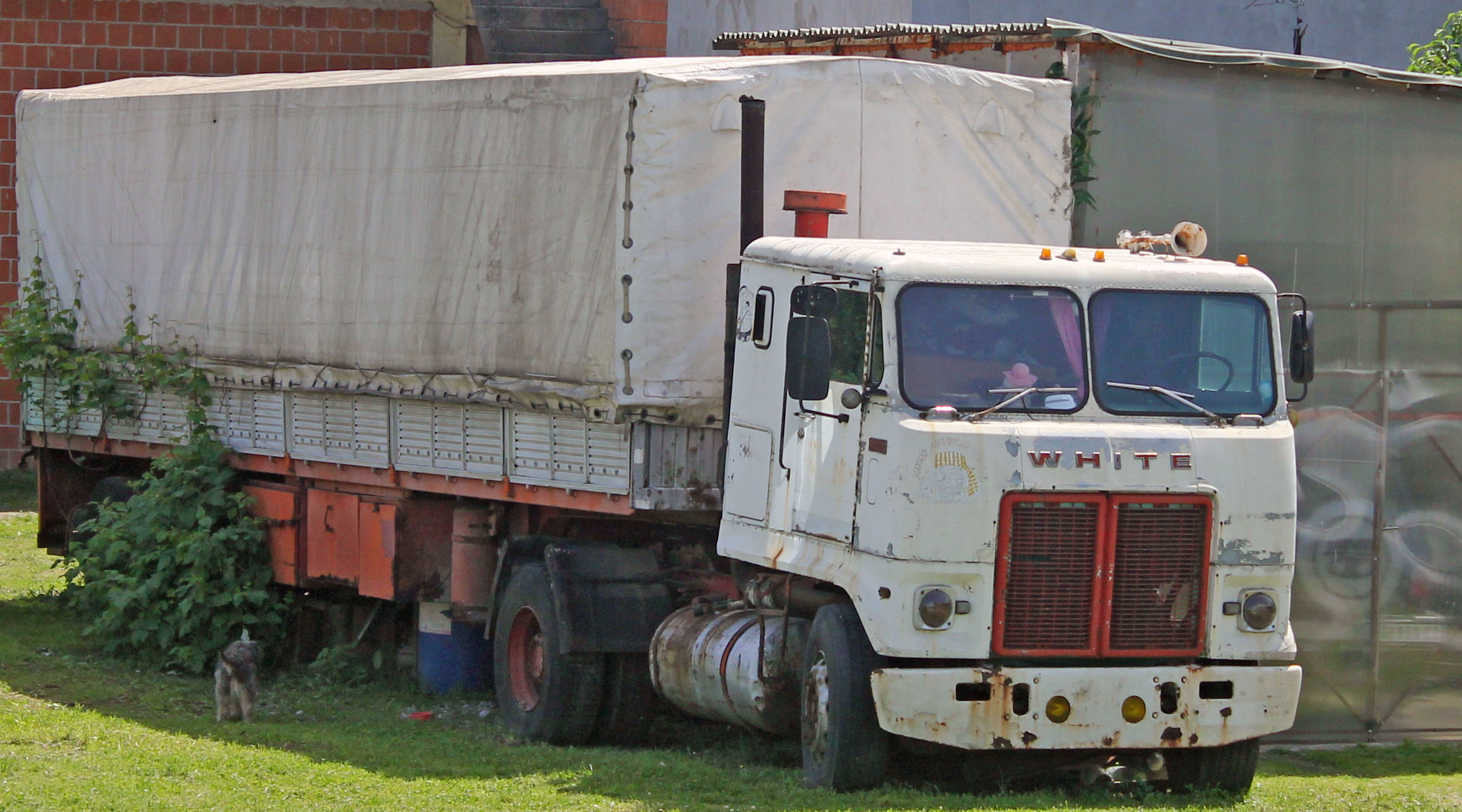
An old White Commander in Belgrade

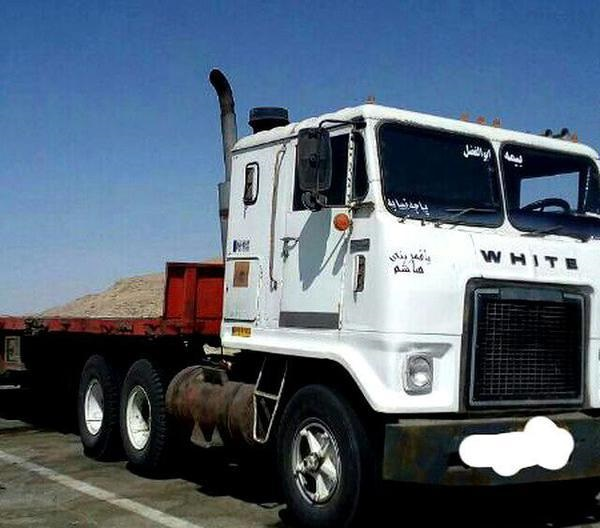
A White Commander in Iran

== Western Star ==
Western Star had originally been created by White in 1967, specifically to target the west coast trucking markets dominated by west coast makers Peterbilt and Kenworth. After White was purchased by Volvo in 1980, Western Star went its separate way — but the White-built cabovers continued to be available in Canada and in some western states with Western Star badging. The Western Star model never received the diagonal crossbar logo that other Volvo-built White trucks had. The Western Star Cabover also has a riveted on shield beneath the front windshield, helping to alter its appearance.
