= Dynafleet =

Volvo Trucks

Dynafleet is a transport information system offered by Volvo Trucks. The system enables the user to view a number of parameters in real time, including current vehicle location, vehicle fuel consumption, driver times, vehicle emissions, and service intervals. The service was introduced in 1994.

== How it works ==
Dynafleet is a web-based package that communicates with mobile tracking hardware installed on delivery vehicles. GPS devices and associated hardware communicate detailed data to the Dynafleet main database, which can be accessed via internet from any PC. A communication screen in the vehicle allows for two-way communication between the driver and the home office.

In addition to fuel consumption, the hardware is capable of logging how many times the vehicle stops, its load during each stage of its trip, and its AdBlue consumption.

== Packages ==
Dynafleet offers several different packages, depending on the client's needs. The three services provided by the system include:

- Fuel & Environment: provides access to a number of reports, including fuel consumption, environmental reports, and vehicle service intervals.
- Driver Times: offers remote tachograph download, activity reports etc.
- Positioning: provides detailed maps, showing the location of individual delivery vehicles.
- Messaging: provides the capacity to send text messages between drivers and their home office.

== Increased efficiency ==
Dynafleet gives everyone in the transport chain important information. This in turn increases understanding of the entire operation, and costly mistakes can be avoided. The assignments are carried out more efficiently and planning is easier.

The driver receives rapid and accurate information in clear text. The driver's environment is safer and there are fewer misunderstandings. With Dynafleet, the driver can take decisions that promote more economical driving.

The traffic planner can take decisions that utilise the entire vehicle fleet and minimise empty runs. This allows companies to handle more orders with existing personnel and the existing vehicle fleet.

The fleet manager can plan service intervals so that the vehicle fleet's active time is maximised. The information stored in the system allows managers to follow up everything from individual vehicles to the entire fleet. Dynafleet also gives the company an objective basis for subsequently rewarding those who do things correctly.

At the office, administrative work is made easier. Dynafleet is easily integrated with existing office systems via a software option (API). This simplifies administration since Dynafleet's information is accessed from an office's regular administration program.

== Mobile applications ==
Volvo also introduced a mobile application for their Dynafleet service, available on iPhone, iPad and android. New features include fuel efficiency score. This works by tracking fuel consumption for every vehicle and driver in any given fleet. Using this, the Dynafleet app calculates fuel efficiency scores for four key areas: anticipating and braking, engine and gear utilization, speed adaptation, and standstill. Each score can then be broken down into specific parameters for more detailed information.
