= Volvo FE =

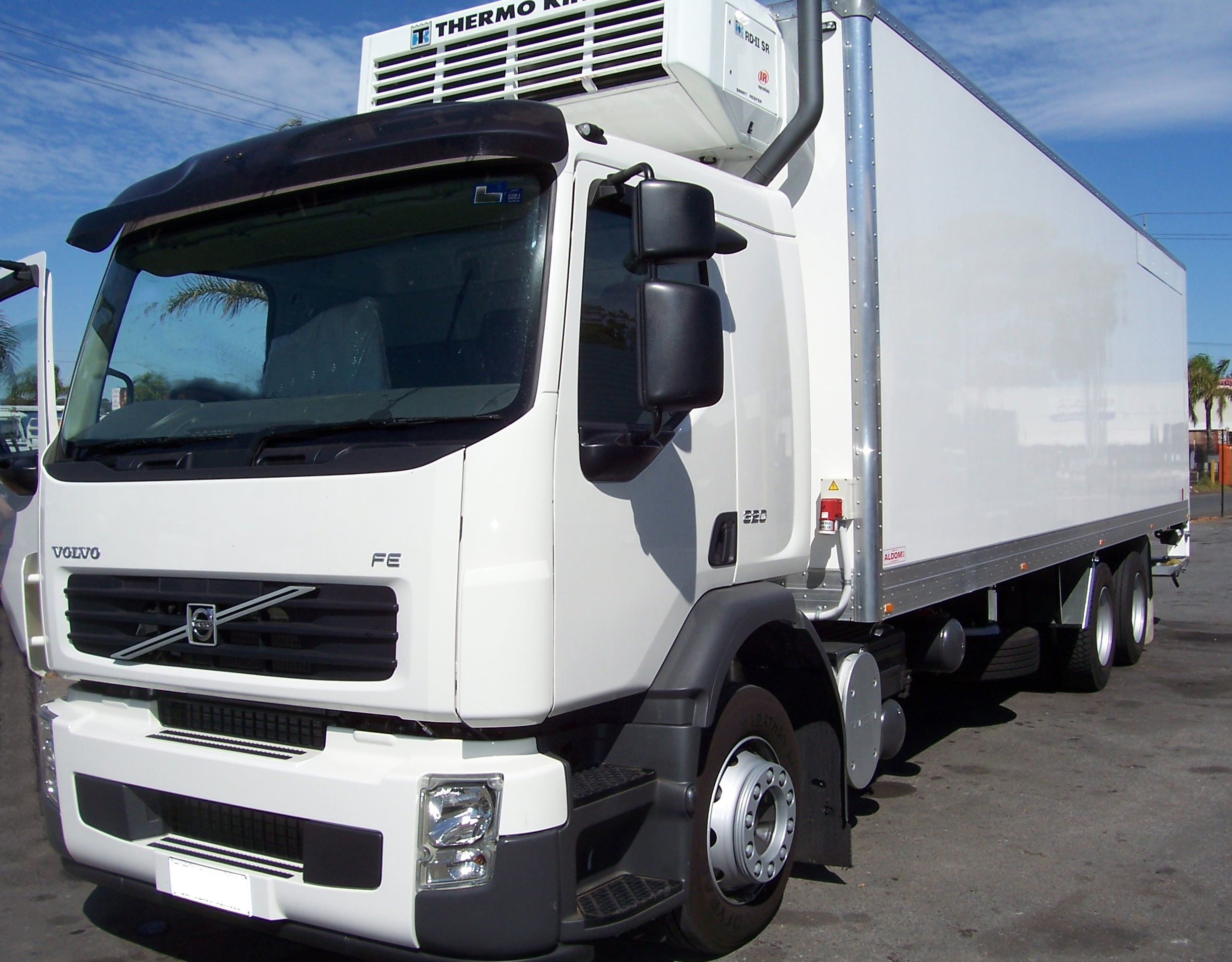

Overview
- Manufacturer: Volvo Trucks Corporation
- Also called: FL
- Production: 2006-present

Body and chassis
- Body style: COE

Powertrain
- Engine: D7E
- Power output: 225 kW (FE Electric)
- Transmission: ZTO1109 (manual), AL306 (automatic)
- Battery: 375 kWh (FE Electric)

Chronology
- Predecessor: FL7

D7E
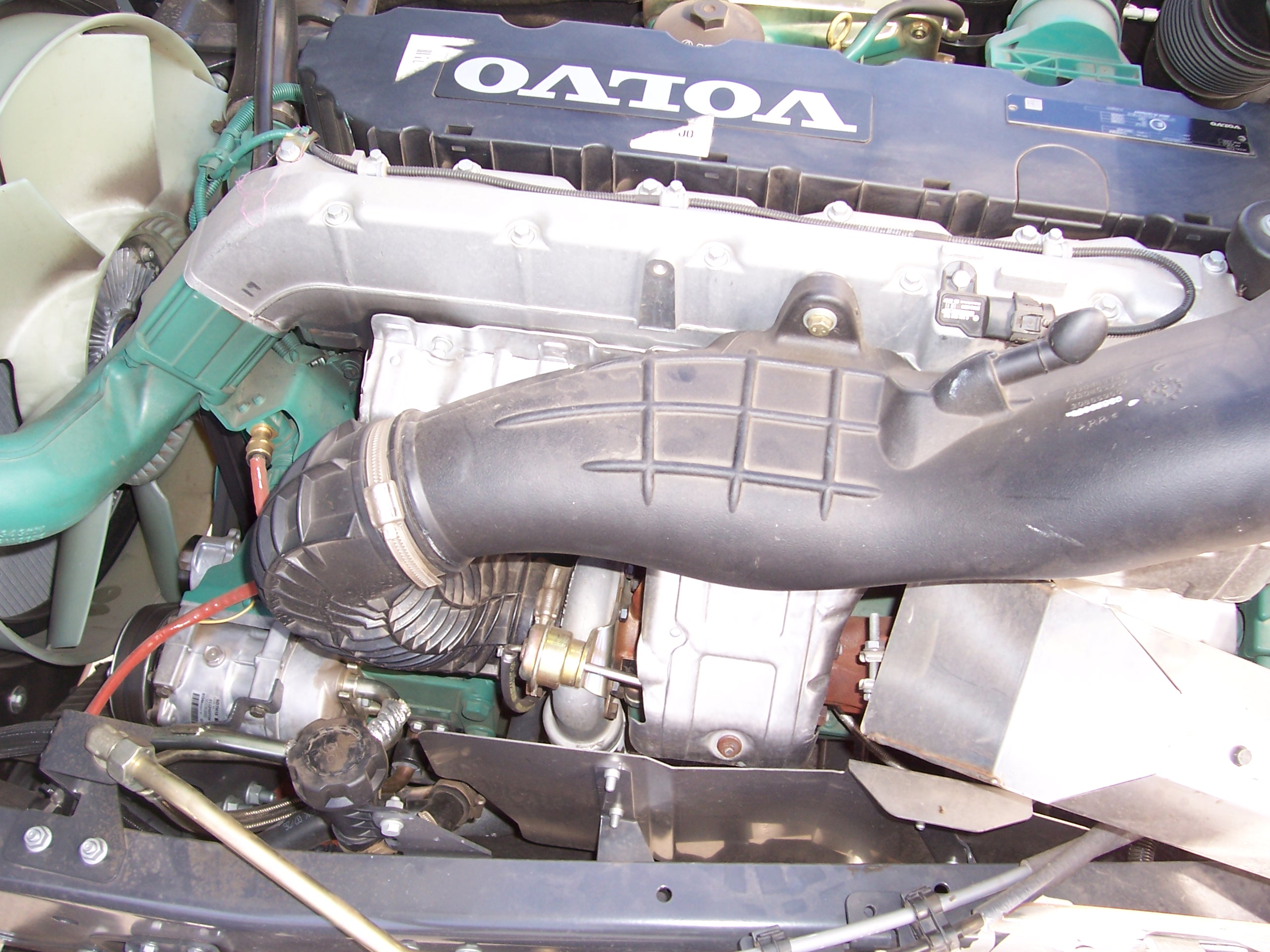

Overview
- Manufacturer: Deutz

Layout
- Displacement: 7.14 Litre
- Cylinder bore: 108 mm (4.3 in)
- Piston stroke: 130 mm (5.1 in)
- Cylinder block material: cast iron
- Cylinder head material: 1x single cast iron
- Valvetrain: OHV
- Compression ratio: 18:1

Combustion
- Turbocharger: Intercooled
- Fuel system: Common Rail Diesel
- Fuel type: Diesel fuel
- Cooling system: Liquid cooled

Output
- Power output: 177 kW (237 hp)-206 kW (276 hp)-235 kW (315 hp)
- Torque output: 920 N⋅m (680 lb⋅ft)-1,050 N⋅m (770 lb⋅ft)-1,200 N⋅m (890 lb⋅ft)

Dimensions
- Length: 1,218 mm (48.0 in)
- Width: 718 mm (28.3 in)
- Height: 983 mm (38.7 in)
- Dry weight: 590 kg (1,300.7 lb)

Chronology
- Predecessor: D7C

The Volvo FE is a medium duty truck produced by Volvo Trucks Corporation since 2006, now in its second generation. The FE is available in various rigid versions and a tractor version spanning three weight classes.

The First Generation FE introduced in 2006 the Volvo FE shares same engine and gearboxes with Volvo FL and it includes a 320 hp (239 kW) engine version. The FE cabins are cabover design and available as day cab, comfort cab and a sleeper cab. All the cabs are tested and approved according to the Swedish crash test and the Volvo's toughest barrier and head impact tests. A redesigned FE was introduced in May 2013.

== Design and Technology ==
=== Engine ===
The all new diesel engine built by Deutz and features a common rail fuel injection concept. The engines are available in Euro III and Euro IV requirements where latter is achieved by SCR for exhaust gases treatment. The common rail is a fuel injection technology which uses "common rail" as a reservoir to supply fuel injector with fuel operating at injection pressure up 1600 bar. The system is popular on diesel engines up to 8 litres capacity as used by e.g. MAN, DAF, Iveco and Mercedes Benz.

Engine design follows the rest of the Volvo engines where timing gears are located at the rear, which allows for better air flow around engine area. The engine also comes with integrated engine brake available in two versions, either a stand-alone butterfly type exhaust brake or with a JAK integrated compression brake from Jacobs Vehicle Systems. This, the so-called "bleeder" brake, is a simplified version of a traditional Jake compression brake. The total braking output is 130 kW (177 PS) at 2800 rpm for exhaust unit and up to 188 kW (256 PS) at 2800 rpm for the compression brake.

=== Transmission ===
The vehicle is available with both manual and automatic transmissions. The manual gearboxes are made by ZF of Ecomid range and automatic transmissions by Allison There are two manual gearboxes with cable linkage system and servo assist to reduce gear changing effort. The 6 speed overdrive has a direct shift pattern and is available with 240 hp (179 kW) and 260 hp (194 kW) engines. The 9 speed overdrive range change with so called double H pattern is available for tractor units and higher GCM vehicles.

The automatics are available in two models as 6-speed top two overdrive electronically controlled Allison MD3060 and AL306 and both have a hydraulic retarder as an option with maximum brake torque of 1,700 N⋅m (1,253.9 lb⋅ft).

=== Brakes and Air system ===
The brake system for FE is similar to the rest of the FM/FH family of trucks with EBS however a new integrated air dryer system called APM or Air Production Management was introduced. APM combines the functions of air dryer, regulator, four-way protection valve, pressure limiting and safety valves, pressure sensors and blocking valve into one unit and is electronically controlled. The main advantages of the system are in reduced numbers of separate components which also reduces risk of air leakage and electrical connectors failures.

=== Chassis ===
The FE line is available in two frame heights for general transport distribution duty or one light construction transport duty. The suspension is available either on full air or combination of front parabolic leaf spring and rear air bags or rear S parabolic springs. Wide selection of rear axle ratios in both single and hub reduction are on offer with differential locks as standard in 4x2,6x2 and 6x4 configuration.

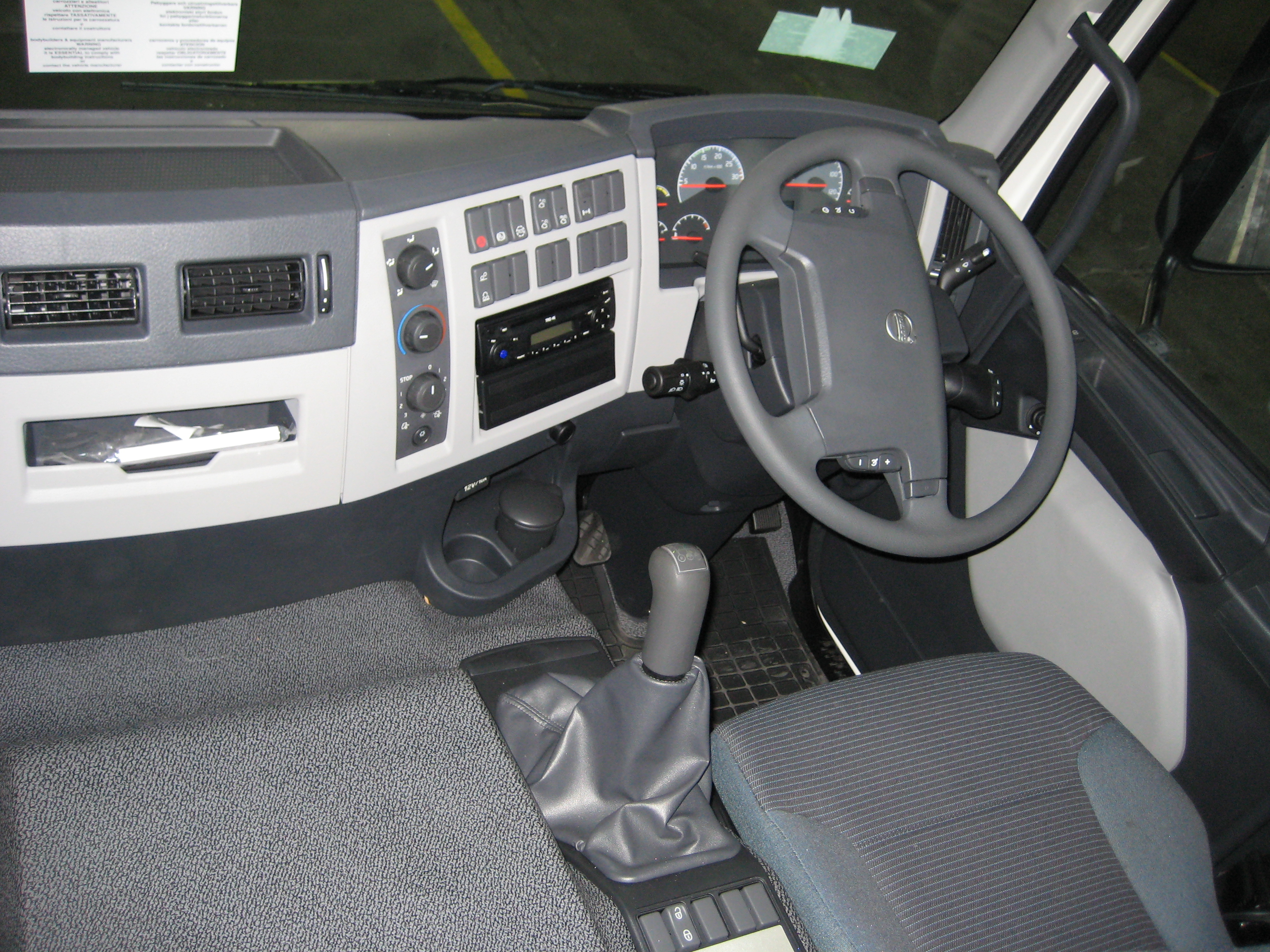

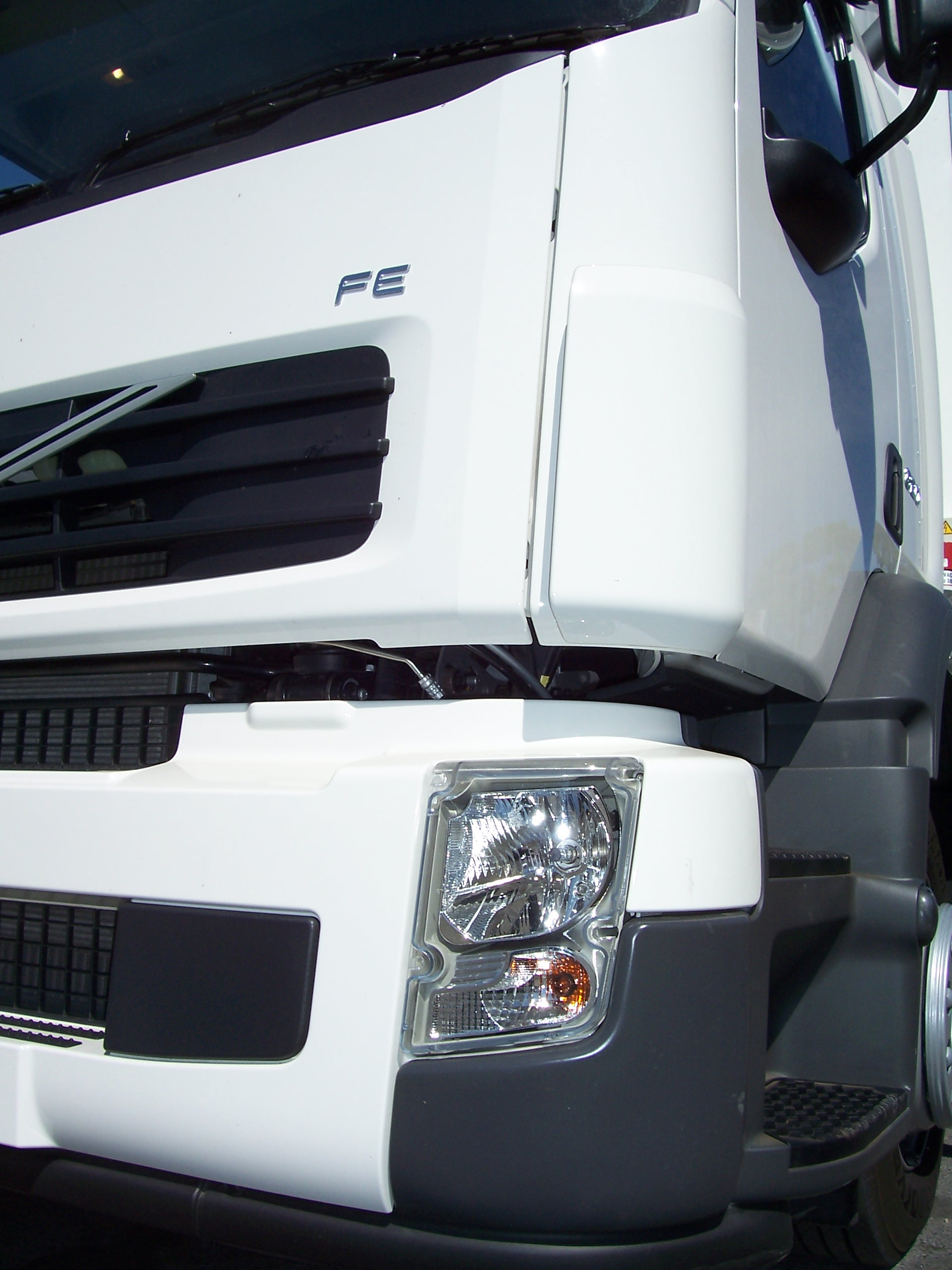

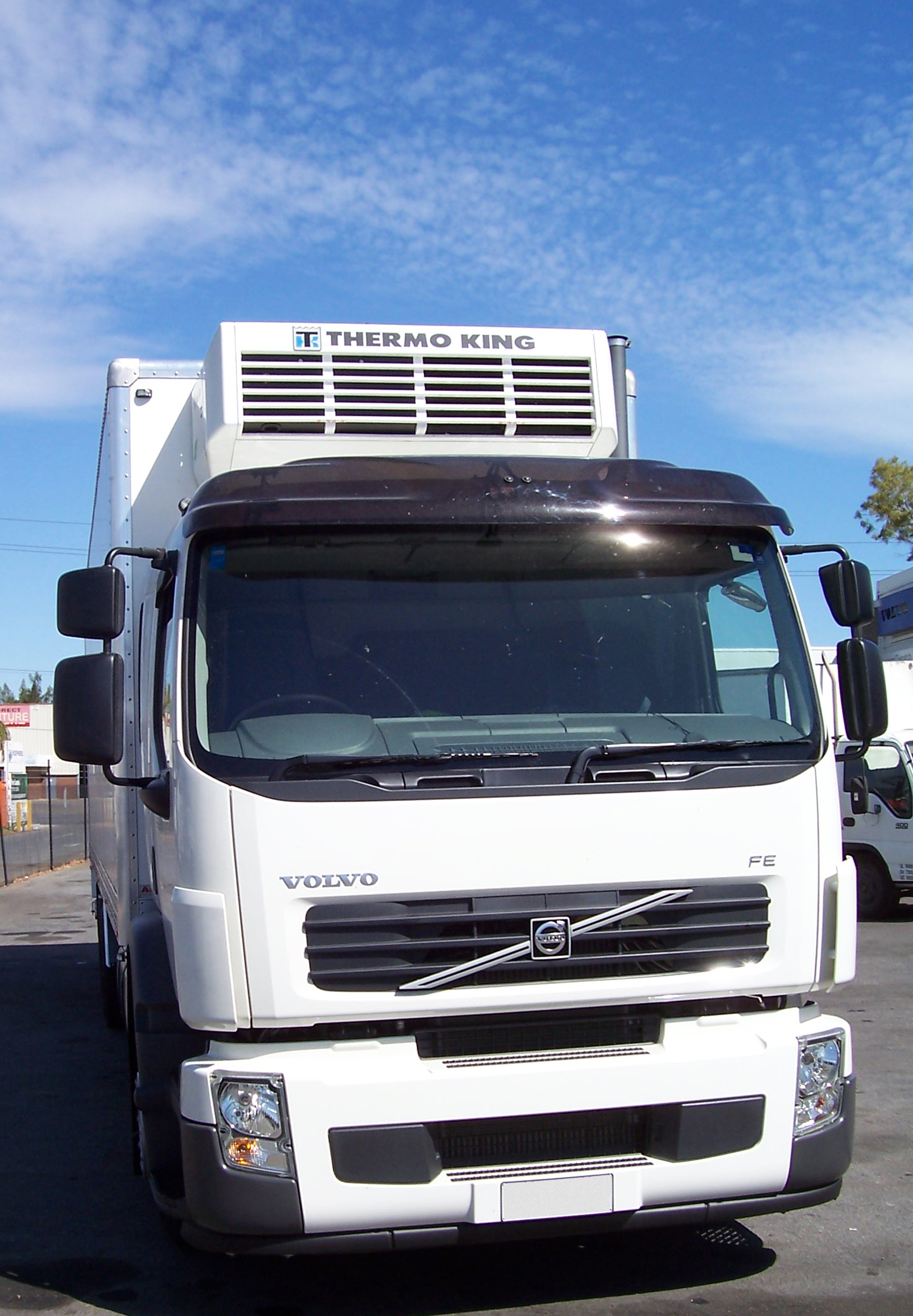

== Production ==
The Volvo Trucks Corp. has introduced a hybrid Volvo FE. This truck can drive 1,5 km on its electric engine. The truck has received a Dutch certificate for Quiet Truck, when used in town areas.

== The 2013 model ==
A new version of the Volvo FE was launched on May 14, 2013, together with the new Volvo FL. One of the new features is the ability to equip the truck with the I-Shift automatic transmission, and another feature is ESP (Electronic Stability Program) which helps the driver to keep the truck on the road.

The engine of the 2013 Volvo FE is a 6-cylinder D8 engine with a displacement of 7.7 litres.

== External links and references ==
- Volvo FE
- FE Hybrid
- Volvo FH 500
