= Volvo F10, F12, and F16 =

Volvo F10, F12 and F16
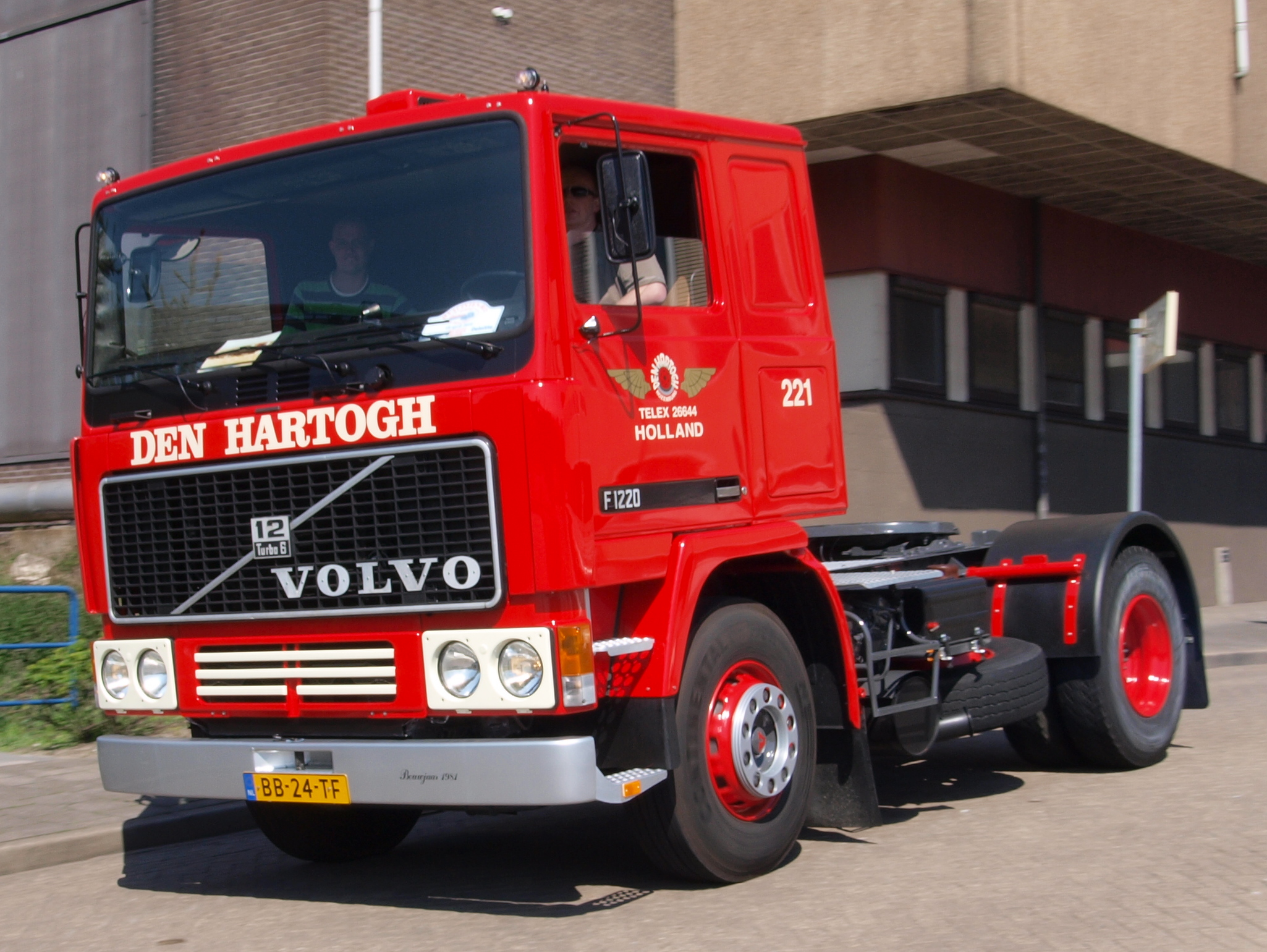
- 1981 Volvo F12 220 4x2 tractor truck

Overview
- Type: Truck
- Manufacturer: Volvo Trucks
- Production: 1977–1993 approx. 200.000 built

Body and chassis
- Class: Heavy Truck
- Body style: COE

Chronology
- Predecessor: Volvo F88
- Successor: Volvo FH

Volvo F10, F12, and F16 are a series of trucks manufactured by Volvo Trucks between 1977 and 1993. Volvo manufactured about 200,000 trucks in this series between 1977 and 1993.

== F10 and F12 ==
Introduced in 1977 as a replacement to the F88/89 which were the flagship tractors of the company. The new names were given based on the engine capacity of the units F10 for the 10 litres engine unit F12 for the 12 litres unit, although the F10 had a 9.6 litres engine and F12 had 12 litres. Powered by TD100 and TD120 engines, they produced 280 and 320hp, respectively. F10 and F12 provided more comfort, power, style and safety compared to the outgoing F88/89.

The basic chassis components and also the driveline components of the trucks, when launched in 1977, were to a large extent based on the ones introduced in 1973 for the Volvo N-series trucks. All engines are straight six-cylinder turbocharged diesel engines of Volvo's own make. In 1979 Volvo introduced Globetrotter models for the long distance transportation, these models had upgraded cabins which were higher than the normal cabin so that the operators could stand and sleep well in the cabin. This model was only available in the F12 model.

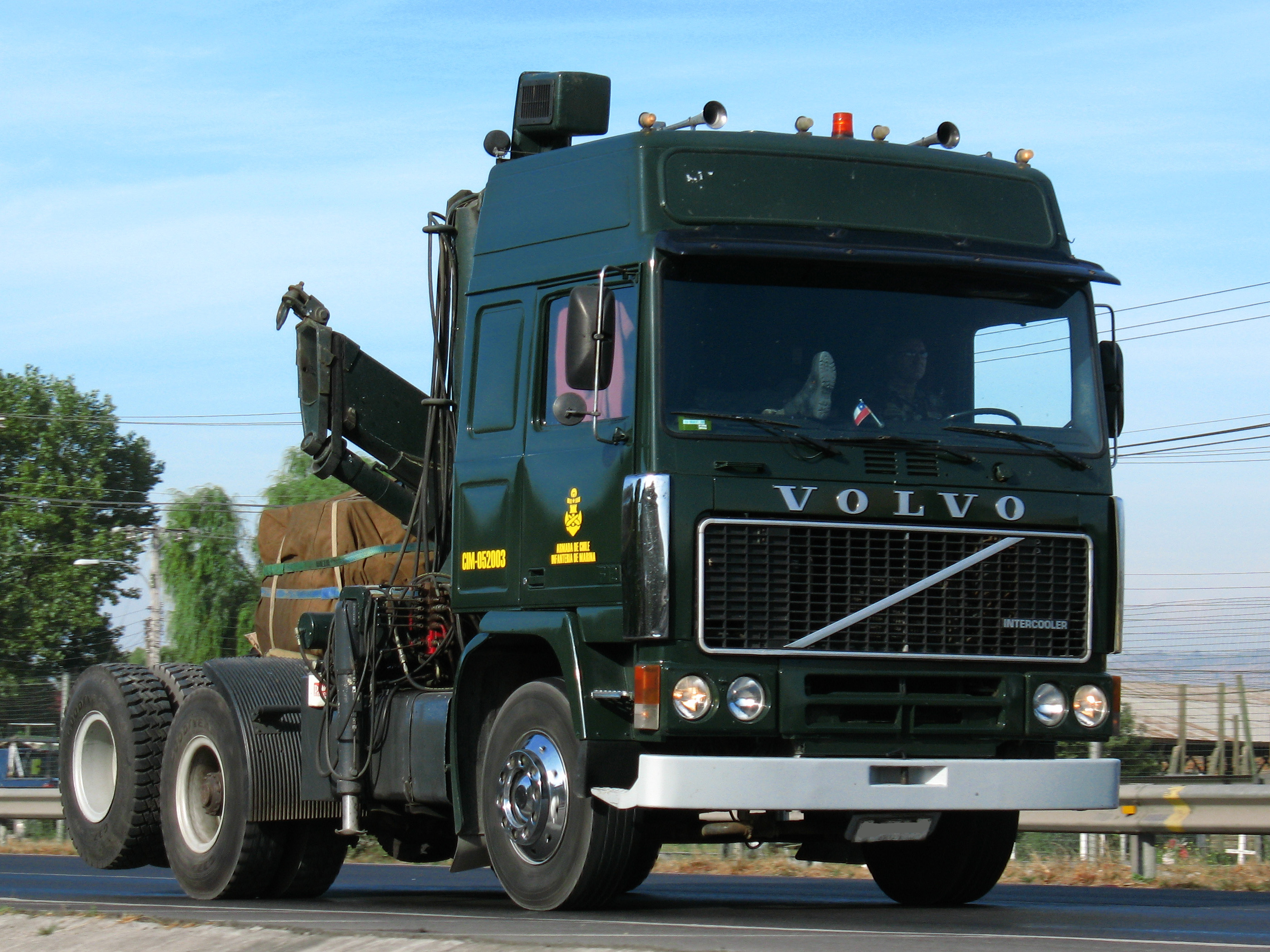
1982 Volvo F12 Globetrotter - the first Globetrotter version has the same windshield as the flat-roofed versions.

The series got two major upgrades during its production. The first one arrived in 1983: it included major changes to the cabin, including a larger windscreen and taller roof, and a new chassis with decreased weight and parabolic springs. The engines also got an upgrade, but the power outputs were unchanged. The Globetrotter received a taller windscreen, reaching the top of the higher roof. This model (F10) won the International Truck of the Year Award in 1984.

== F16 ==
The F16 was introduced in 1987 with a 16-litre engine. As with the F10 and F12, the name was derived from the engine size, and became Volvo's flagship model. In addition, it was also the most powerful tractor of Europe beating MAN 19462, Mercedes-Benz 1644, Iveco turbostar 190.42 and Scania 2-series producing 460hp from its TD162F engine. This engine, like the TD100 and TD120, was an inline six-cylinder engines.

In 1993 the F10, F12, and F16 were replaced with the FH series. The first models introduced under FH series were FH12 and FH16.
