= Hagerstown Volvo Powertrain =

- Built: 1961
- Operated: 1961–present
- Location: 13403 Volvo Way; Hagerstown, Maryland, United States
- Coordinates: 39.6788°N 77.7270°W
- Industry: Automotive
- Products: engines
- Employees: 1,400
- Volume: 1,500,000 square feet (140,000 m^{2})
- Owner: Volvo

Hagerstown Volvo Powertrain is an engine manufacturing plant in Hagerstown, Maryland, owned by Volvo.

== History ==
The plant was opened in 1961 as a $45 million, 180-acre site operated by Mack Trucks to produce diesel engines and transmissions. In 1966, Hagerstown plant employed approximately 3,000 workers operating on a three-shift schedule represented by the United Auto Workers.

In January 1986, Mack Trucks announced it will terminate 1,000 of the roughly 3,000 workers at the Hagerstown engine plant over a span of several months. Company officials threatened that the facility could face full closure and consolidation into a new $80 million southern assembly plant if labor cost reductions were not met.

On October 23, 1987, Mack laid off 444 workers at the Hagerstown plant on the same day it permanently closed its 62-year-old primary assembly plant in Allentown, Pennsylvania. Production and assembly shifted to a new, state-of-the-art nonunion plant in Winnsboro, South Carolina.

In 1989, Mack spent over $105 million to upgrade its Hagerstown engine and transmission lines. By the early-to-mid 1990s, the plant produced roughly 25 transmissions and 50 to nearly 200 diesel engines per day, including the popular E-7 diesel engine. The Hagerstown plant supplied engines for prominent fleet orders, such as a $38 million deal with United Parcel Service in 1994 for CH conventional trucks.

In October 2006, Volvo laid off 600 employees at the plant due to declining truck sales and the introduction of new U.S. emission standards.
