= The Commercial Vehicle Show =

Annual auto show at NEC Birmingham

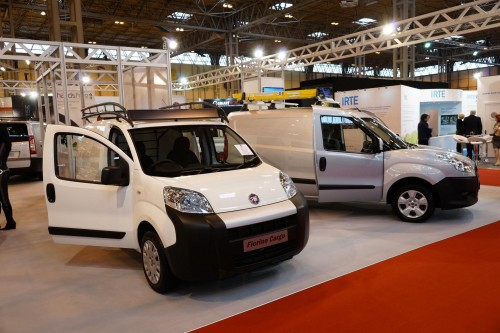
Fiat Commercial Vehicles at the CV Show 2013

The Commercial Vehicle Show is an annual auto show held every April at the NEC Birmingham since 2000.

== 2013 ==
Dates: 9–13 April

- Citroen Berlingo Electric
- Citroën Dispatch Crew Van
- DAF CF 510
- DAF LF 150
- DAF LF 220
- DAF XF Euro 6
- Fiat Doblo Cargo
- Fiat Doblo XL
- Fiat Ducato Tipper
- Fiat Fiorino Cargo
- Fiat Scudo Cargo
- Fiat Scudo Crew Cab
- Fiat Work Up
- Ford Fiesta Van ECOnetic
- Ford Transit Courier
- Ford Transit Connect
- Ford Transit Custom
- Ford Transit Two-Tonne
- Fuso Canter Eco Hybrid
- Hino 300 Series
- Hino 700 Series
- MAN TGX
- Mercedes-Benz Antos
- Mercedes-Benz Arocs
- Mercedes-Benz Atego 823
- Mercedes-Benz Citan
- Mercedes-Benz Vito Effect
- Mercedes-Benz Unimog
- Mini Clubvan
- Nissan Cabstar
- Nissan e-NV200 Concept
- Nissan NV200
- Nissan NV200 Taxi
- Nissan NV400
- Isuzu D-Max Double Cab
- Isuzu D-Max "Eiger" Double Cab
- Isuzu D-Max "Yukon" Double Cab
- Isuzu D-Max "Utah" Double Cab
- Isuzu Euro V EEV Forward
- IVECO Eurocargo
- IVECO Stralis
- Volvo FH
- Volvo FM 370 6x2
- Volvo FM 410 4x2
