= International Truck of the Year =

Automotive contest

The International Truck of the Year (ITOY) is an annual award made by the international transport sector. Each year an expert jury, consisting of leading, authoritative specialist journalists, selects the International Truck of the Year from the new vehicles appearing on the European market. At The 67th IAA Nutzfahrzeuge, IToY added new award: IToY Truck Innovation Award.

== Recipients of the award ==
International Truck of the Year
Year	Winner	Second place	Third place
1977	Seddon Atkinson 200		
1978	MAN 280		
1979	Volvo F7		
1980	MAN 321		
1981	Leyland T45		
1982	Ford Cargo		
1983	Renault G260/290		
1984	Volvo F10		
1985	Mercedes-Benz LN		
1986	Volvo FL		
1987	MAN F90		
1988	DAF 95		
1989	Scania 3-series		
1990	Mercedes-Benz SK		
1991	Renault AE Magnum		
1992	Iveco Eurocargo		
1993	Iveco EuroTech		
1994	Volvo FH		
1995	MAN F2000		
1996	Scania 4-series		
1997	Mercedes-Benz Actros		
1998	DAF 95XF		
1999	Mercedes-Benz Atego		
2000	Volvo FH		
2001	MAN TGA	Renault Midlum	Volvo FL
2002	DAF LF	Volvo FH12	Renault Magnum Millenium
2003	Iveco Stralis	DAF XF95	Volvo FM
2004	Mercedes-Benz Actros	Iveco Eurocargo	Volvo FH16
2005	Scania R-series	MAN TGA	Renault Mascott
2006	MAN TGL	Iveco Trakker	Mercedes-Benz Atego
2007	DAF XF 105	Renault Premium Route	Volvo FL
2008	MAN TGX/TGS	Iveco Stralis	Renault Premium Lander
2009	Mercedes-Benz Actros	Iveco Eurocargo	Scania R-series with EGR & Volvo FH
2010	Scania R-series	Volvo FH16	MAN TGL/TGM
2011	Mercedes-Benz Atego	Volvo FM/FMX	Scania R-series V8
2012	Mercedes-Benz Actros	Tatra Phoenix	Scania Euro 6 range
2013	Iveco Stralis Hi-Way	Mercedes-Benz Antos	Ford Cargo
2014	Volvo FH16	DAF XF	Mercedes-Benz Arocs
2015	Renault Trucks T	DAF CF	Mercedes-Benz Atego
2016	Iveco Eurocargo	Renault Trucks C and K	Ford Cargo Construction
2017	Scania S Series	Iveco Stralis XP-NP	Mercedes-Benz Actros
2018	DAF New XF/CF	Iveco Stralis NP	Scania XT range
2019	Ford F-Max	Scania P & L-series	Volvo FH & Volvo FM LNG
2020	Mercedes-Benz Actros with MirrorCam	Iveco S-WAY	Volvo FH with I-Save
2021	MAN TGX	Volvo FH	
2022	DAF XF/XG/XG+	Iveco T-WAY	Mercedes-Benz eActros
2023	DAF XD Series	Scania Super Series	Mercedes-Benz Actros with new OM471 engine
2024	Volvo FH Electric	Mercedes-Benz eActros 300/400	Scania 45S Battery Electric Truck
2025	Mercedes-Benz eActros 600	Volvo FH Aero	Iveco S-eWay
2026	DAF XD and XF Electric		

IToY Truck Innovation Award
Year	Winner
2019	MAN aFAS level 4 (MAN Truck & Bus AG)
2020	Hyundai Hydrogen Mobility (H2 Xcient Fuel-Cell)
2021	Mercedes-Benz GenH2 (Hydrogen Truck) & eActros (Battery-electric heavy-duty Truck (BEV))
2022	DAF XF H₂ Innovation Truck
2023	Mercedes-Benz eActros Long-Haul
2024	MAN's Autonomous driving projects ATLAS-L4 and ANITA
2025	MAN hTGX
2026	Bosch’s Road Hazard Service

== See also ==
- List of motor vehicle awards
- Bus & Coach of the Year
