= Renault Premium =

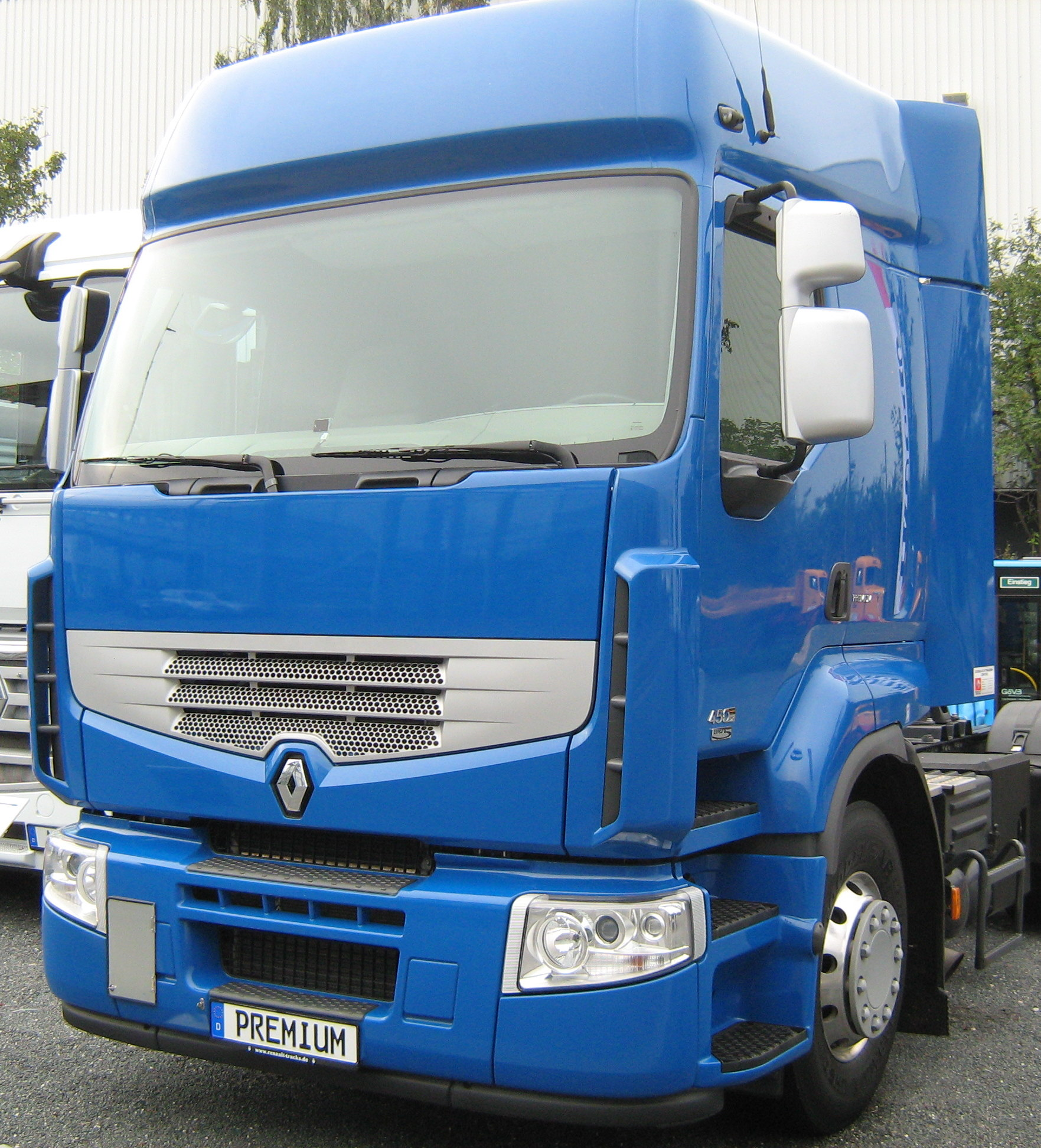

Overview
- Manufacturer: Renault Trucks
- Production: 1996–2014
- Assembly: Bourg-en-Bresse, France; Bursa, Turkey; Montevideo, Uruguay

Body and chassis
- Class: Truck
- Body style: Truck (cab over engine)
- Related: Volvo FM

Chronology
- Predecessor: Renault G Renault R
- Successor: Renault Trucks T

The Renault Premium is a heavy-duty truck that was produced by the French Manufacturer Renault Véhicules Industriels and later Renault Trucks (also part of Renault, now Volvo) from 1996 to 2014.

It was sold alongside the Renault Magnum as a slightly lower positioned alternative. There was also a version intended for lighter duty construction work called the Premium Lander, positioned beneath the heavy-duty Kerax. The Premium was mainly used as a distribution truck, competing with for example the DAF CF and Volvo FM.

== Engines ==
At launch, the Premium was available with either a 9.8 or 11.1 6-cylinder diesel engine. Later Euro IV engines were sourced from parent company Volvo Trucks.

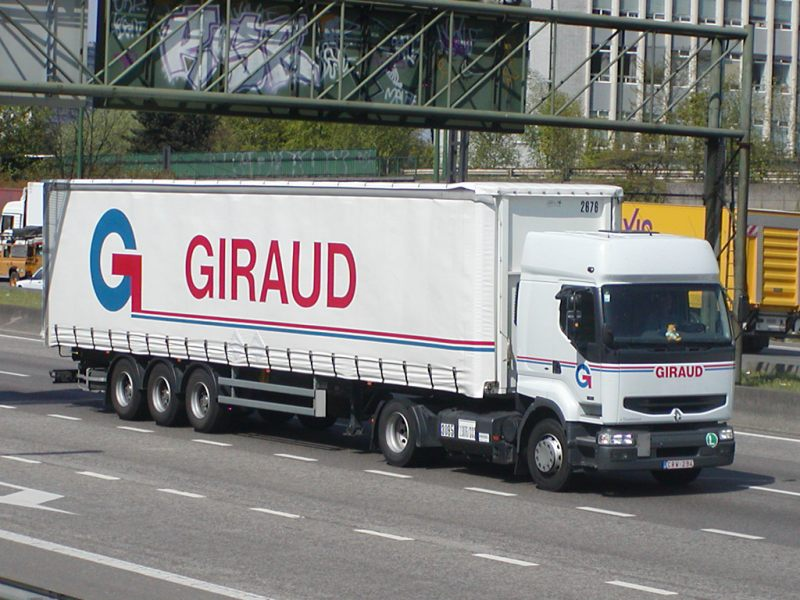
Renault Premium (pre-facelift)

== Premium Distribution ==
Renault Premium Distribution
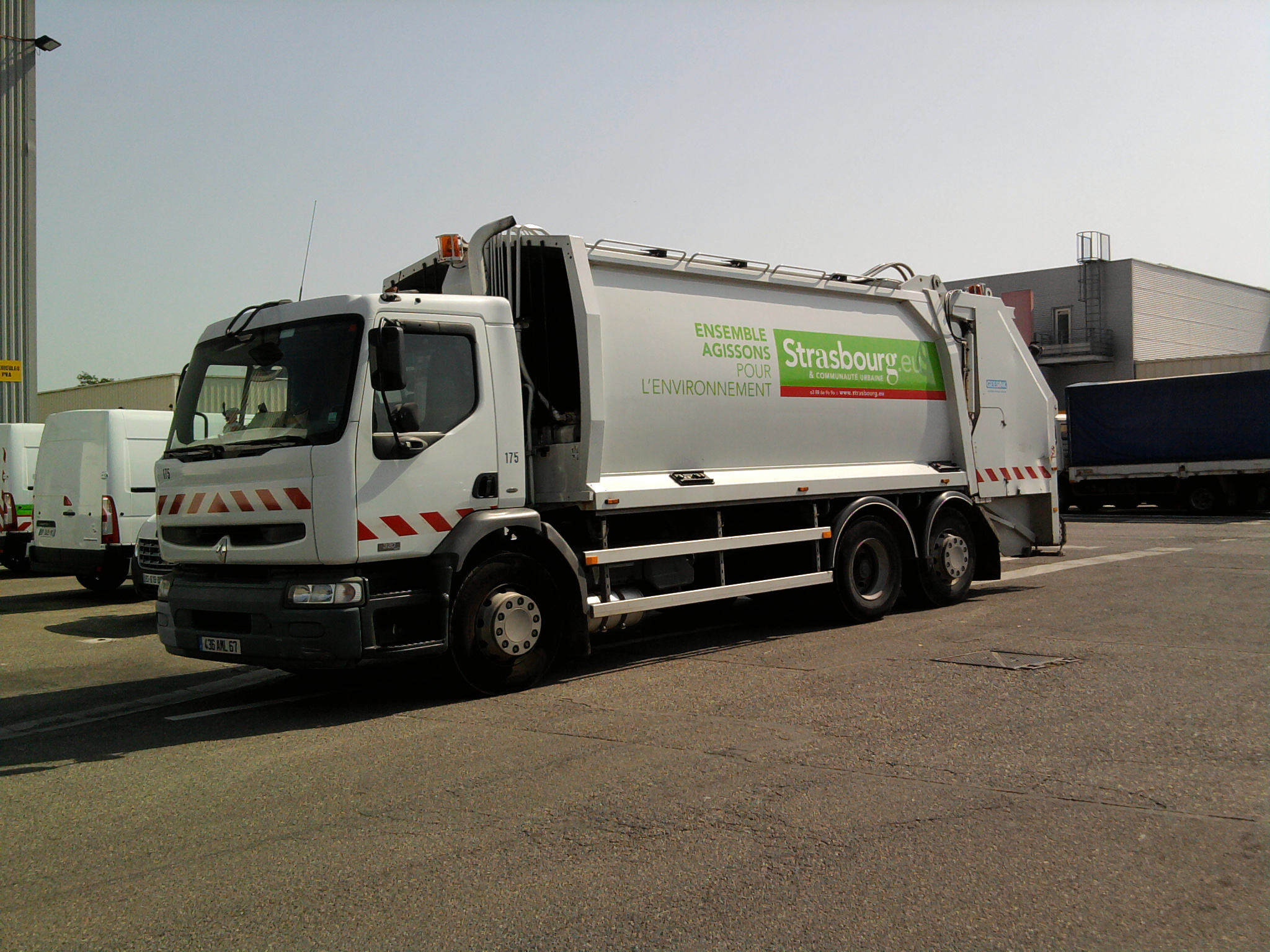
- Renault Premium Distribution in Strasbourg

Overview
- Manufacturer: Renault Trucks
- Production: 1996–2014
- Assembly: France

Powertrain
- Engine: Diesel: I6; Hybrid / diesel
- Electric motor: 120 kW (160 hp) (peak)
- Transmission: manual transmission automatic transmission

Chronology
- Predecessor: Renault Manager
- Successor: Renault Trucks D

The Renault Premium Distribution is a transporter with a gross vehicle mass of 16 to 32 tonnes and a road tractor with a semi-trailer with a GVM of 40/44 tonnes, designed to replace the G range.

In September 2007, Renault Trucks presented the Hybris concept, a hybrid version based on this model.

In 2009, a near-production diesel-electric hybrid version began testing in Lyon, dubbed the Premium Distribution Hybrys Tech, having a power of 340 hp (250 kW).

In 2014, the standard models were replaced by the D range.

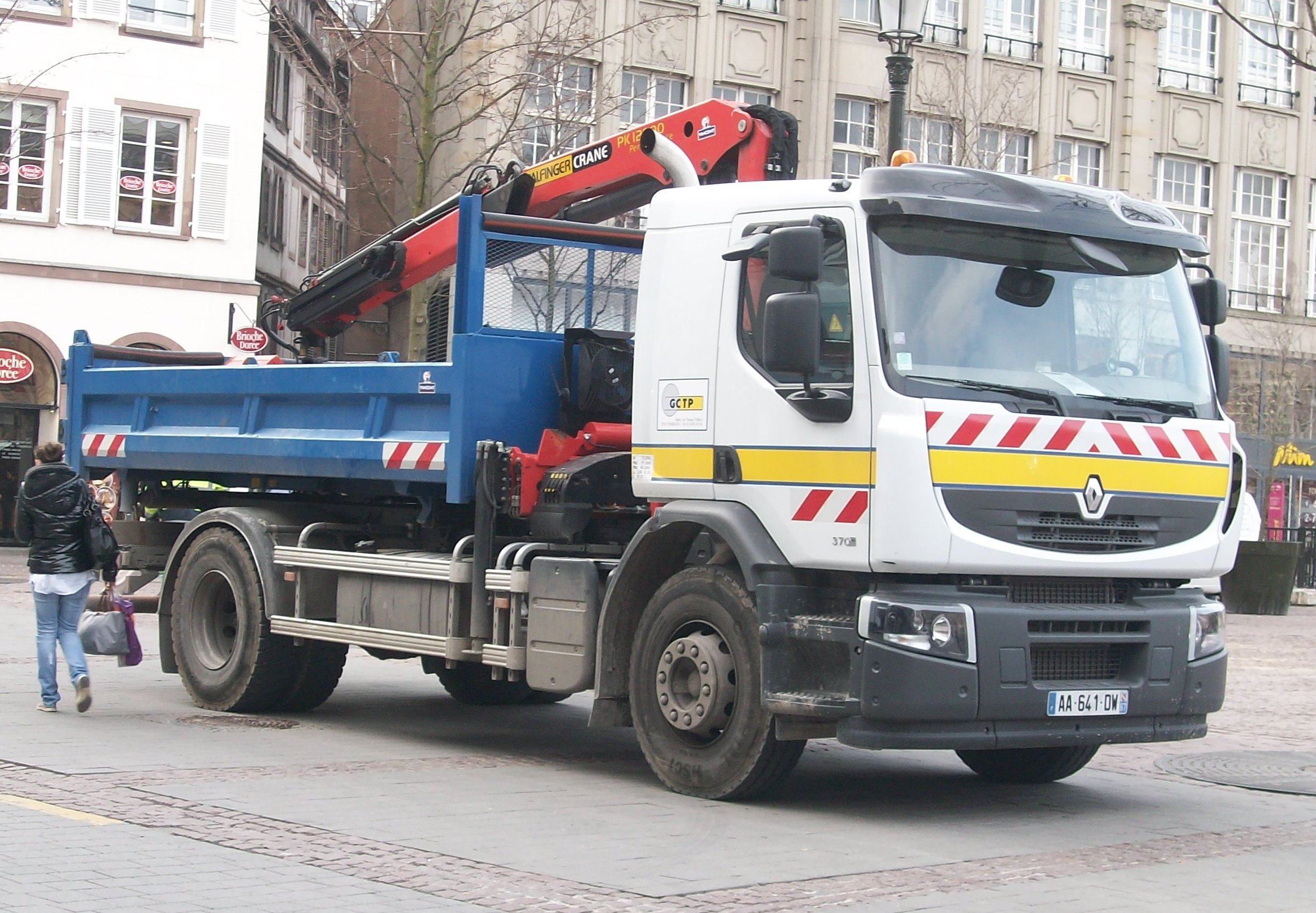
Renault Premium Distribution dump truck

== Print sources ==
- L'atlas des camions français, éditions Atlas, 2007 ISBN 978-2-7234-5924-2
- L'atlas les camions de légende, éditions Atlas, 2004 ISBN 2-7234-4889-4
