= DAF XF =

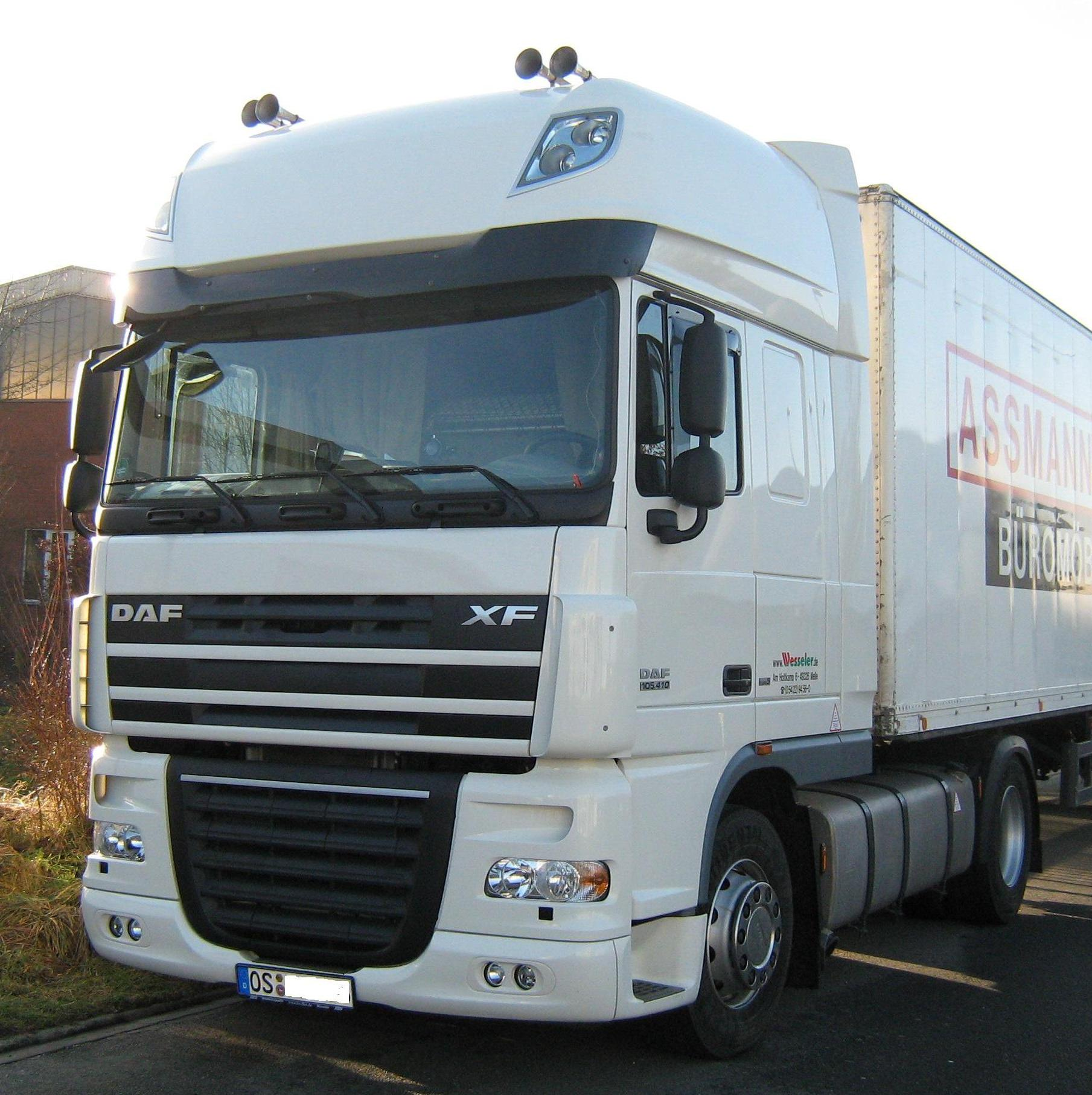

Overview
- Manufacturer: DAF
- Also called: DAF 95XF (1997–2002)
- Production: 1997–present
- Assembly: Netherlands: Eindhoven; UK: Leyland (Leyland Trucks)

Body and chassis
- Class: Large Goods Vehicle
- Body style: Cab-over-engine long-haul semi truck
- Related: DAF CF

Powertrain
- Engine: PACCAR MX-11; I6; PACCAR MX-13; I6
- Electric motor: PACCAR EX-D2
- Power output: 330-390kW (ICE); 270-350kW (BEV)
- Transmission: ZF Friedrichshafen
- Battery: 525 kWh
- Electric range: 460km
- Plug-in charging: 325kW DC; 22kW AC

Chronology
- Predecessor: DAF 95
- Successor: DAF XG

The DAF XF is a range of semi trucks produced since 1997 by DAF Trucks. The XF range has won the International Truck of the Year award multiple times. The XF105 in 2007, the XF106 in 2018 and the NGD XF in 2022. The truck features a 10.8 or 12.9 litre (PACCAR MX 11 or 13) engine and ZF AS Tronic or ZF Traxon gearbox in both manual and automatic formats.

== DAF XG ==
Starting with the 2021 generation, the larger cab variants of the XF are named XG and XG+.

== Safety ==
Euro NCAP test results DAF XF 4x2 Tractor Unit (2024)
Test	Score
Overall:	3 /5 stars
Safe driving	85%
Crash avoidance	35%
Post crash	80%

Euro NCAP test results DAF XF 6x2 Rigid (2025)
Test	Score
Overall:	3 /5 stars
Safe driving	85%
Crash avoidance	35%
Post crash	80%

== Military Use ==
The Canadian Army uses the XF95 Tropco Tractor for their tank transport platform leased from the Dutch Army.

== Gallery ==
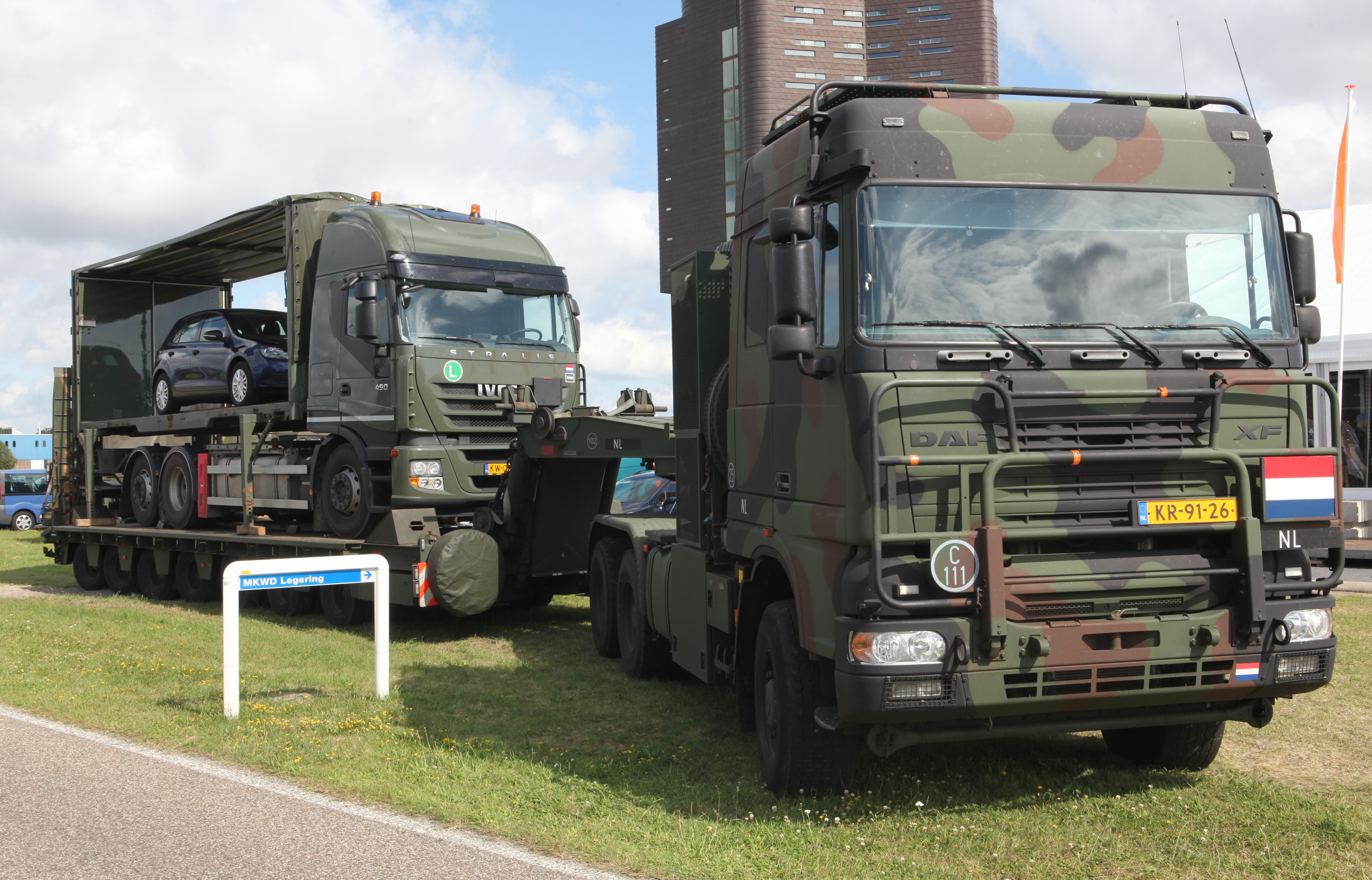
DAF XF95 Tropco

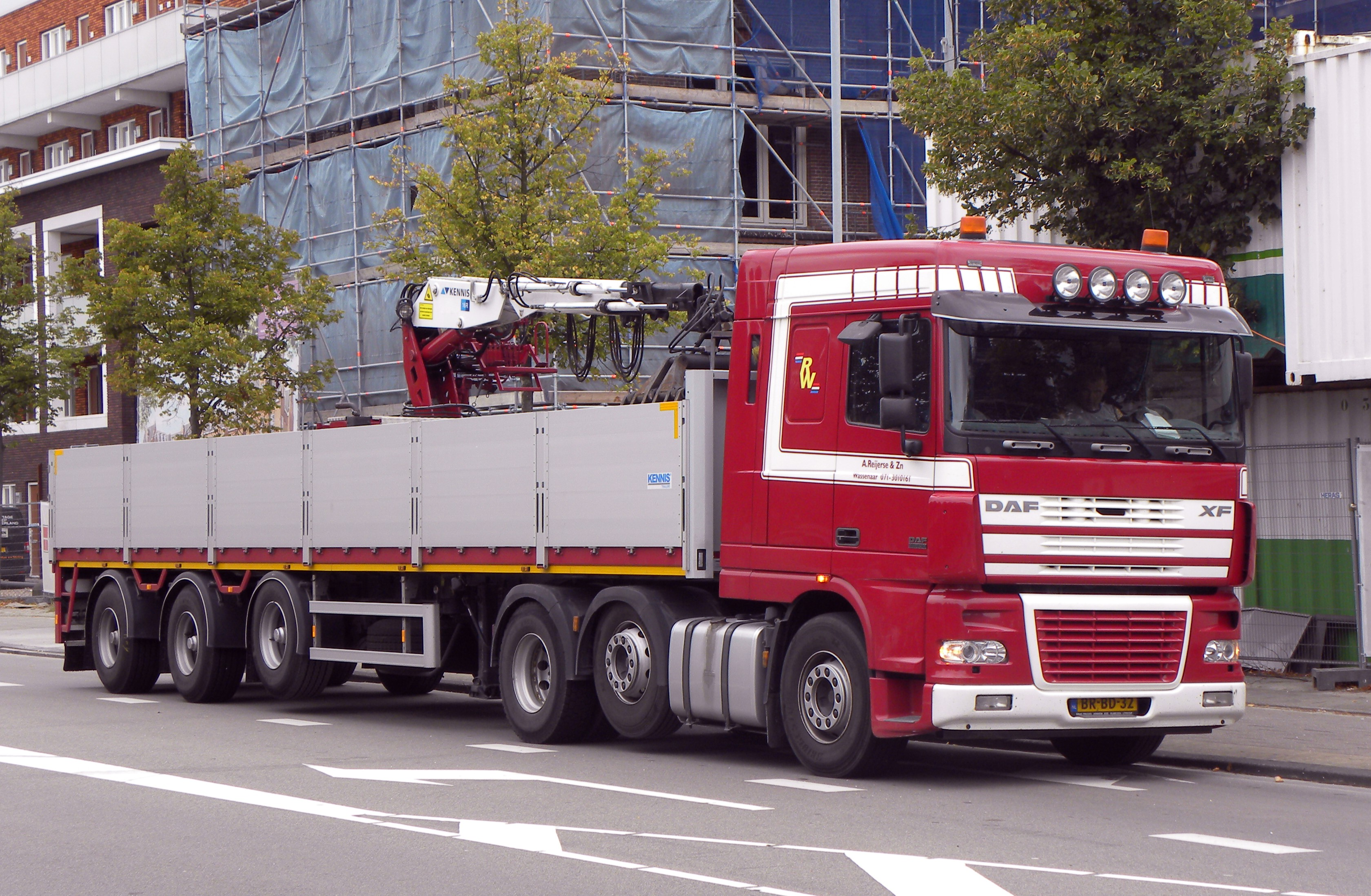
DAF XF Space

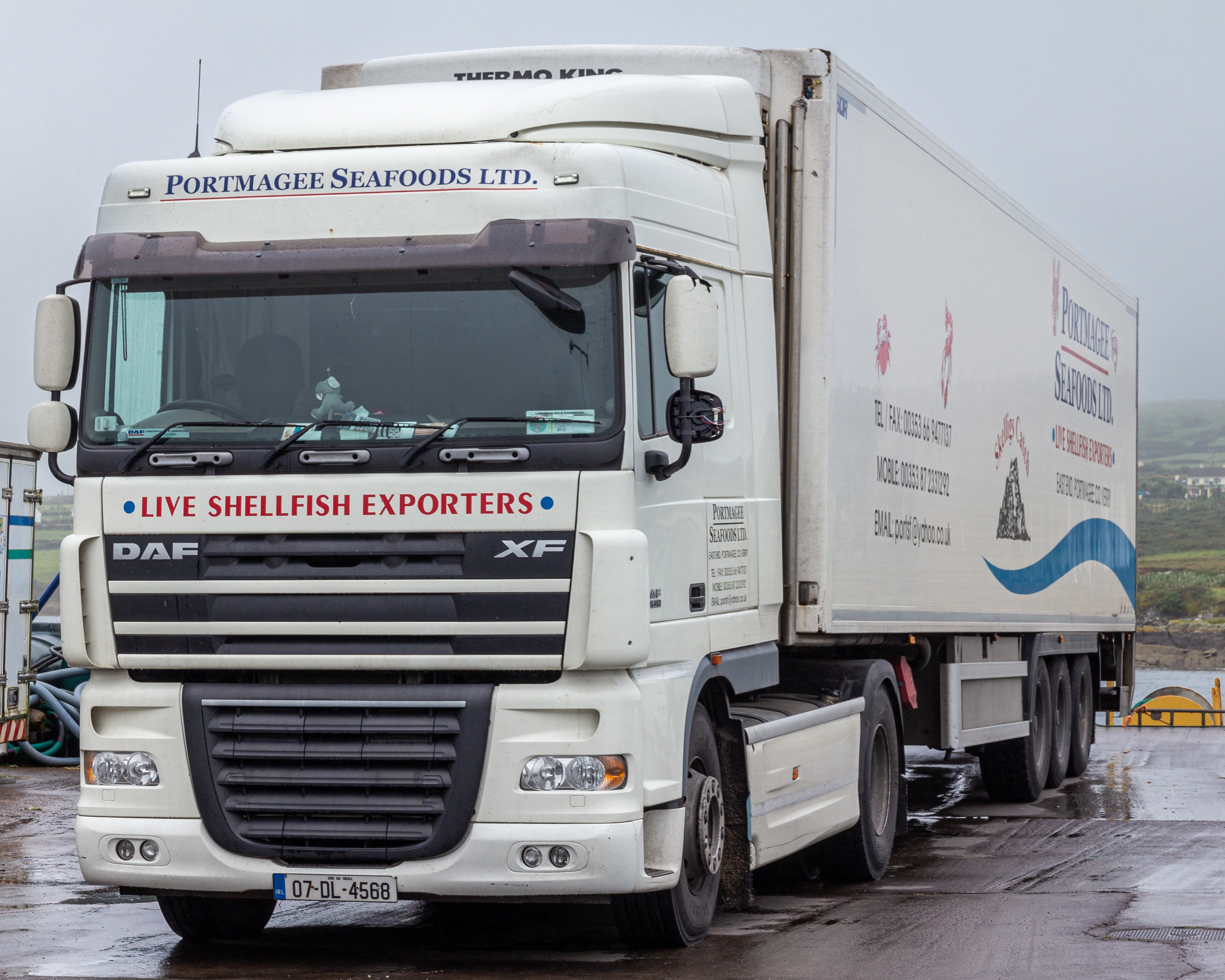
DAF XF 105.460 in Ireland

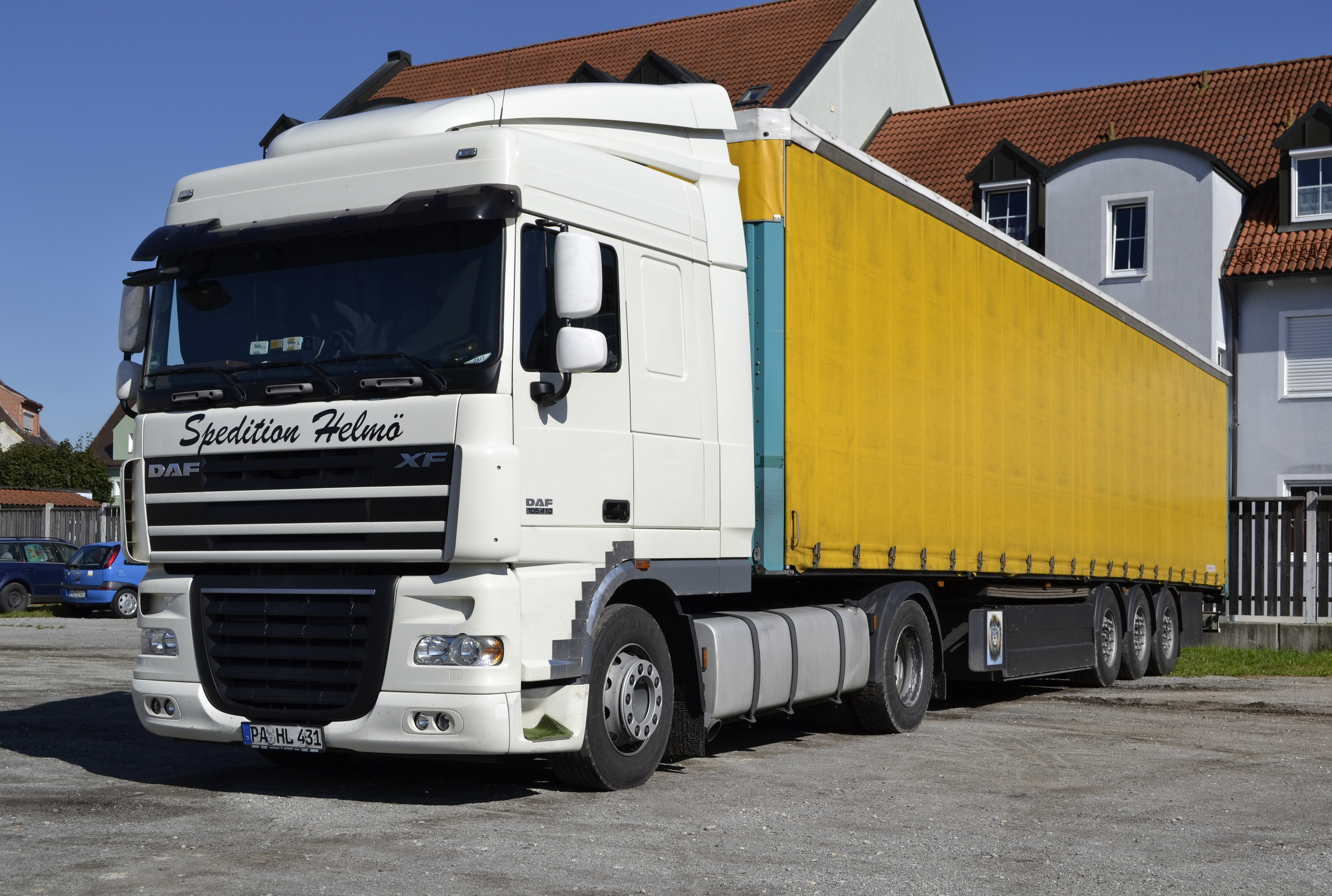
DAF XF Space Cab Plus

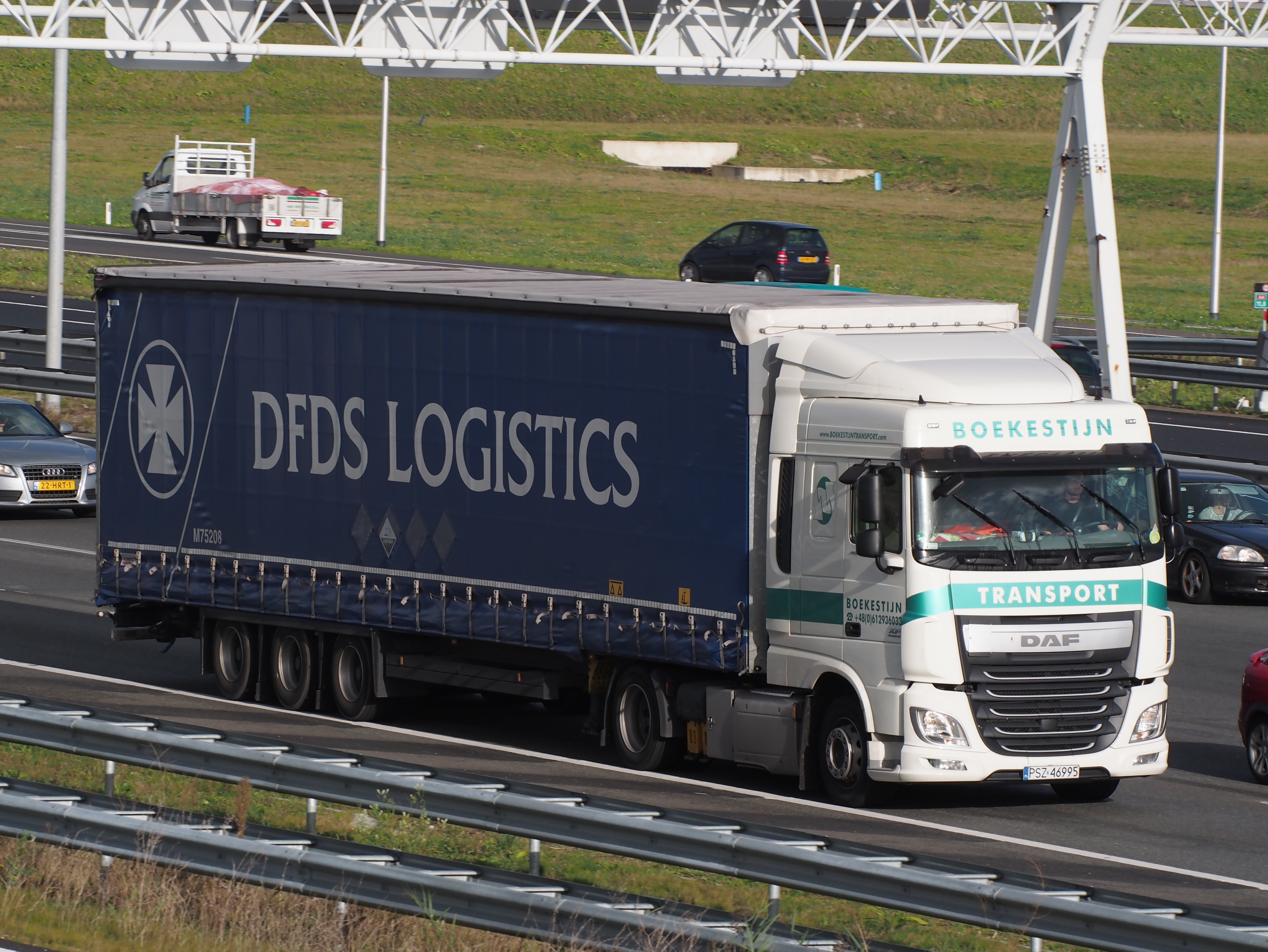
DAF XF Euro 6 Truck
