= Leyland Trucks =

Truck manufacturer

- Company type: Subsidiary
- Industry: Manufacturing
- Founded: 1996; 30 years ago
- Headquarters: Leyland, Lancashire, United Kingdom
- Key people: Phil Jones (managing director)
- Products: Trucks
- Number of employees: 1,100 (2019)
- Parent: Paccar
- Website: leylandtrucksltd.co.uk

Leyland Trucks is a medium- and heavy-duty truck manufacturer based in Leyland, Lancashire, United Kingdom. It can trace its origins back to the original Leyland Motors, which was founded in 1896, and subsequently evolved into British Leyland. After British Leyland became the Rover Group in 1986, the truck business was spun off and merged with DAF Trucks to form DAF NV, which operated as Leyland DAF in the UK.

After DAF NV was placed in administration in 1993, Leyland DAF was purchased in a management buyout and rebranded Leyland Trucks. It has been a subsidiary of Paccar since 1998.

== History ==
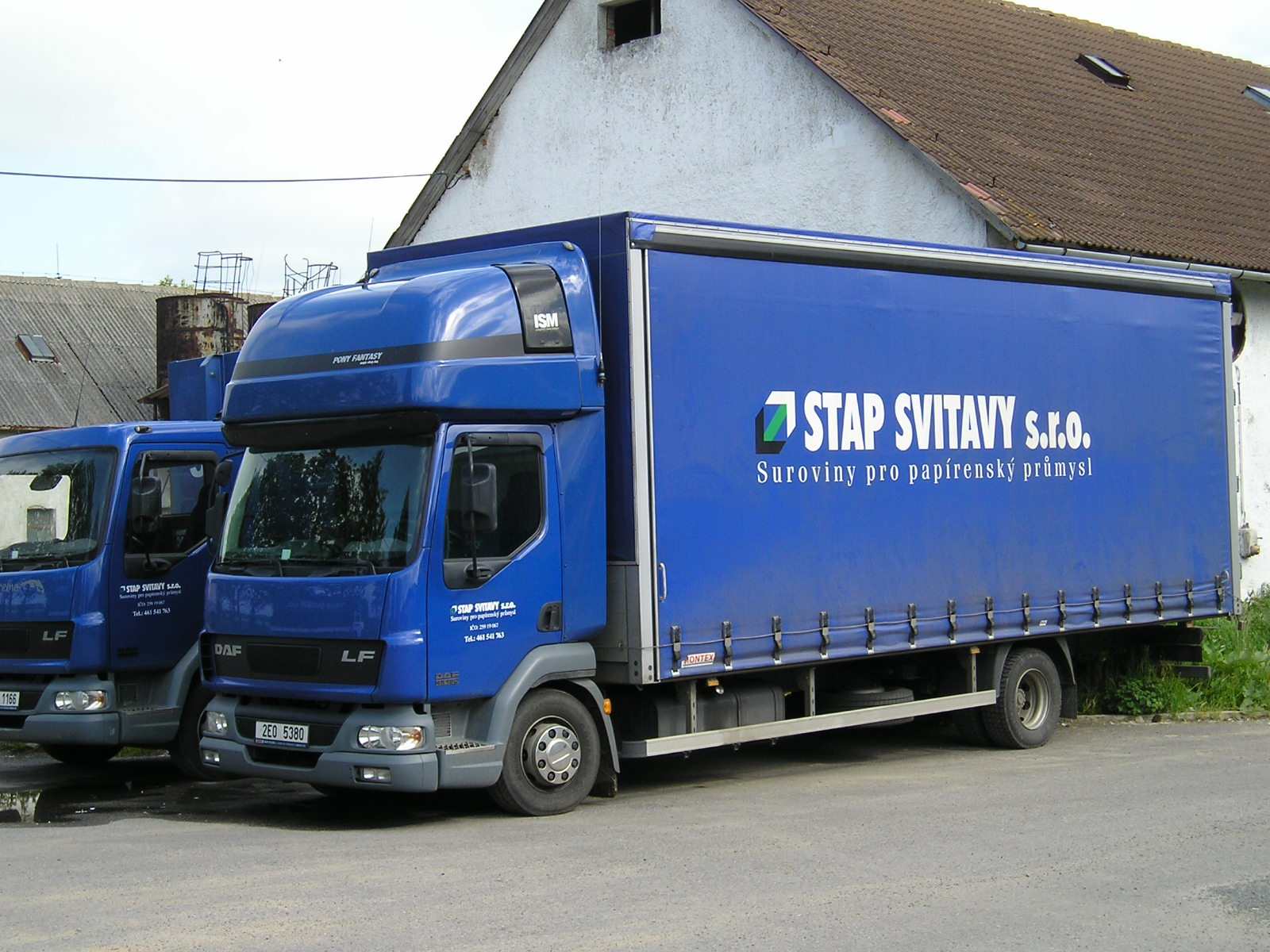
DAF LF designed and built by Leyland Trucks

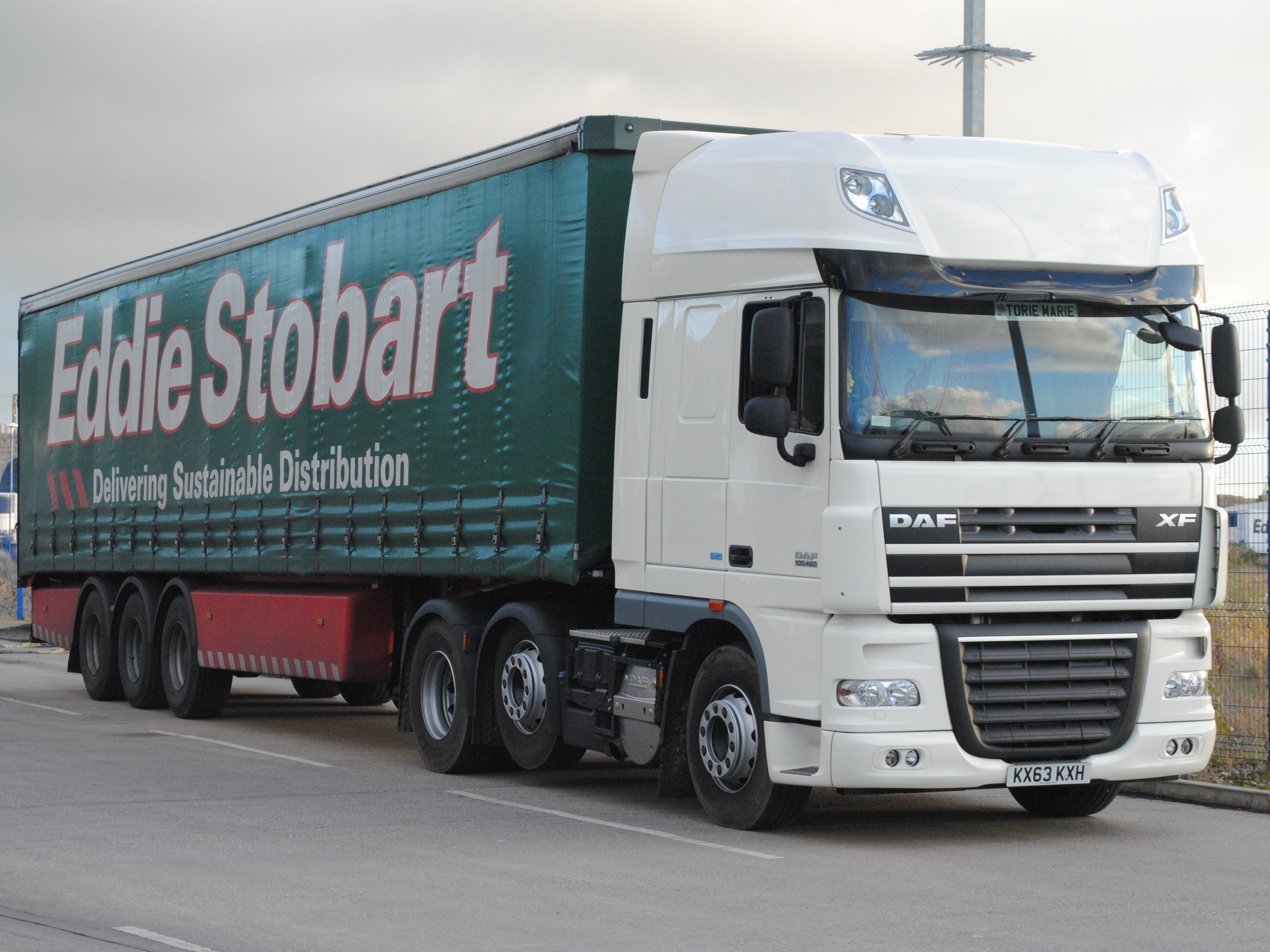
DAF XF built by Leyland Trucks

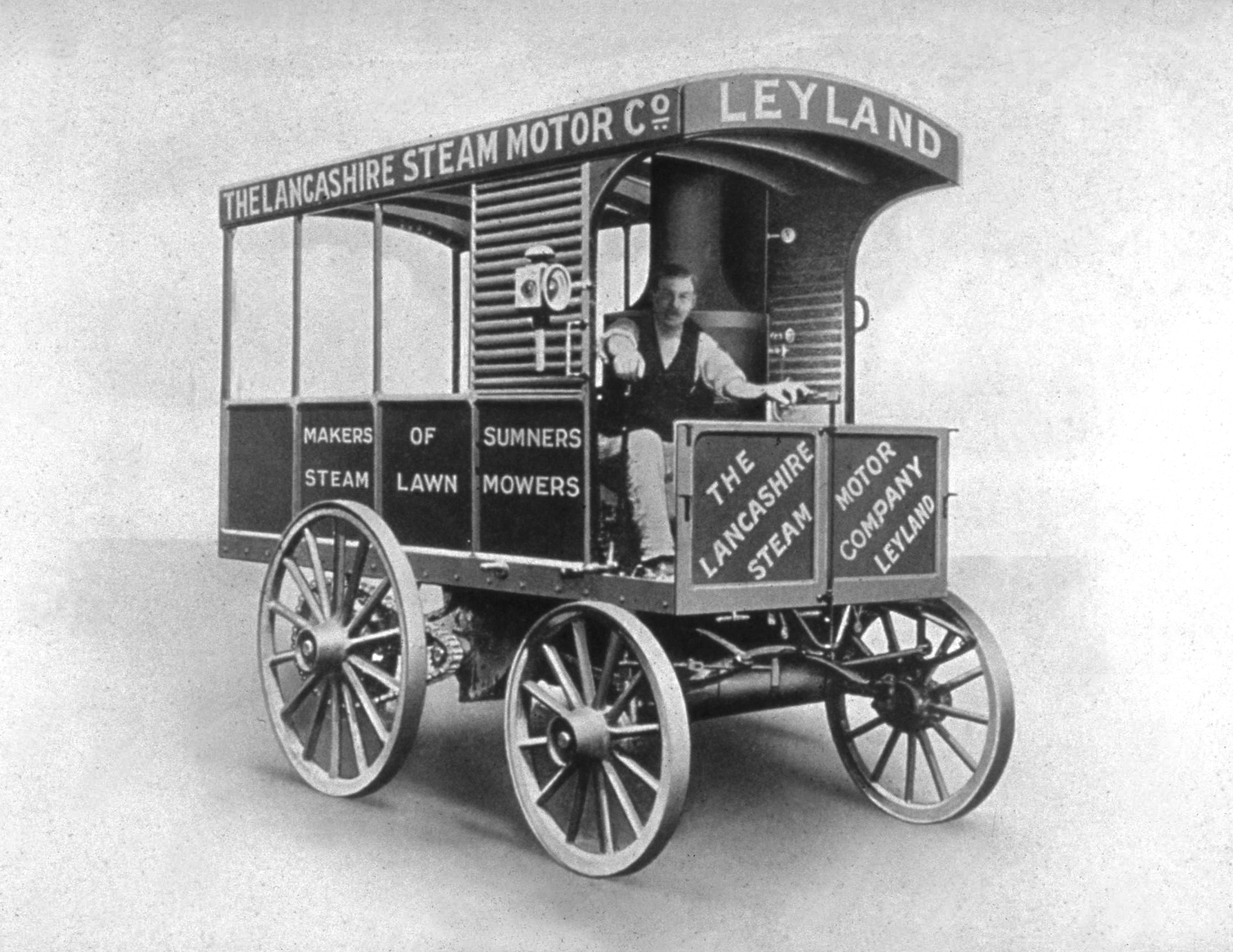
The first truck built at Leyland, 1896

Leyland Trucks' origins were in Leyland Motors, which became part of the British Leyland (BLMC) conglomerate in 1968. Upon the restructuring of BL's successor company, Rover Group, the truck-making division was divested by way of a merger with DAF Trucks in 1987 to form Leyland DAF, under the ownership of DAF NV. When DAF NV was placed in administration in February 1993, Leyland Trucks emerged as an independent company.

=== Timeline ===
- 1896 – The Lancashire Steam Motor Company (LSMC) is formed by James Sumner at the Herbert Street workshops with twenty employees. Henry Spurrier financed the development of a 30cwt steam van, which proved to be successful.
- 1907 – T Coulthard and Co, an engineering firm in Preston, was taken over by LSMC and the combined company named Leyland Motors Limited.
- 1951 – Leyland Motors acquires Albion Motors
- 1955 – Leyland Motors acquires Scammell Lorries Ltd.
- 1962 – Leyland Motors acquires AEC, whose parent company ACV had acquired Thornycroft in 1961
- 1963 – Leyland Motor Corporation forms after Leyland Motors absorbs Standard-Triumph International and Associated Commercial Vehicles during the preceding years.
- 1968 – Leyland Motor Corporation and British Motor Holdings merge to form the British Leyland Motor Corporation (BLMC), which was now the fifth-largest vehicle producer in the world. BMH also owned Guy at that time; thus, BLMC owned and produced Leyland, Albion, Scammell, AEC, Thornycroft, and Guy lorries by the end of the decade.
- 1972 – BLMC discontinue use of the Albion marque.
- 1975 – BLMC is nationalised by the government in response to the Group's severe financial problems. The corporation becomes British Leyland, with Leyland commercials becoming part of the autonomous Truck and Bus Division.
- 1977 – BLMC discontinue use of the AEC marque.
- 1978 – Leyland Vehicles Limited becomes the new name for the division.
- 1979 – Production starts during September at the all-new Leyland Assembly Plant, the first build being a Leyland Leopard bus chassis.
- 1981 – LVL splits into three companies: Leyland Trucks, Leyland Bus and Leyland Parts.
- 1982 – Leyland ceases production of Guy lorries.
- 1986 – Parent company British Leyland is renamed the Rover Group; the new company begins divesting its non-car manufacturing-related businesses.
- 1987 – DAF Beheer takes a 60% controlling share in DAF NV, taking over Leyland Trucks (which included Freight Rover), with both operations rebranded Leyland DAF.
- 1988 – Leyland DAF ceases production of Scammell lorries.
- 1993 – When DAF NV was placed into administration, the Leyland factory is subject to a management buyout, and becomes Leyland Trucks Limited.
- 1998 – Leyland Trucks is acquired by Paccar, which had previously acquired Foden Trucks in 1980 and DAF Trucks in 1996.
- 2000 – Production of all Foden product transfers to the Leyland Assembly Plant.
- 2005 – Leyland Trucks starts painting truck chassis robotically on the moving conveyor, a first in the industry.
- 2006 – Leyland Trucks stops production of Foden trucks, following the decision to retire the brand Foden.
- 2007, in another industry-leading move, Leyland Trucks starts production of the complete bodied truck. Bodies are built on the production line, under the same quality controls, and fitted directly to its chassis prior to delivery to the customer.
- 2008, on 17 April, Leyland Trucks produced its 300,000th truck. Mark Armstrong Transport took delivery of the DAF XF 105 direct from the assembly line.
- 2008 – Leyland Trucks built a record 24,700 trucks at the assembly facility (beating the previous record of 2007 of 17,500), supporting DAF's leading market share of the United Kingdom of 27.3%.
- 2021 - Leyland Trucks begins production of the new generation DAF model range.

== Products ==
- DAF LF – Designed, developed and assembled at Leyland Trucks.
- DAF CF – All CF65 2-axle rigids, and all right-hand-drive (RHD) versions of the CF75 and CF85 are assembled at Leyland Trucks.

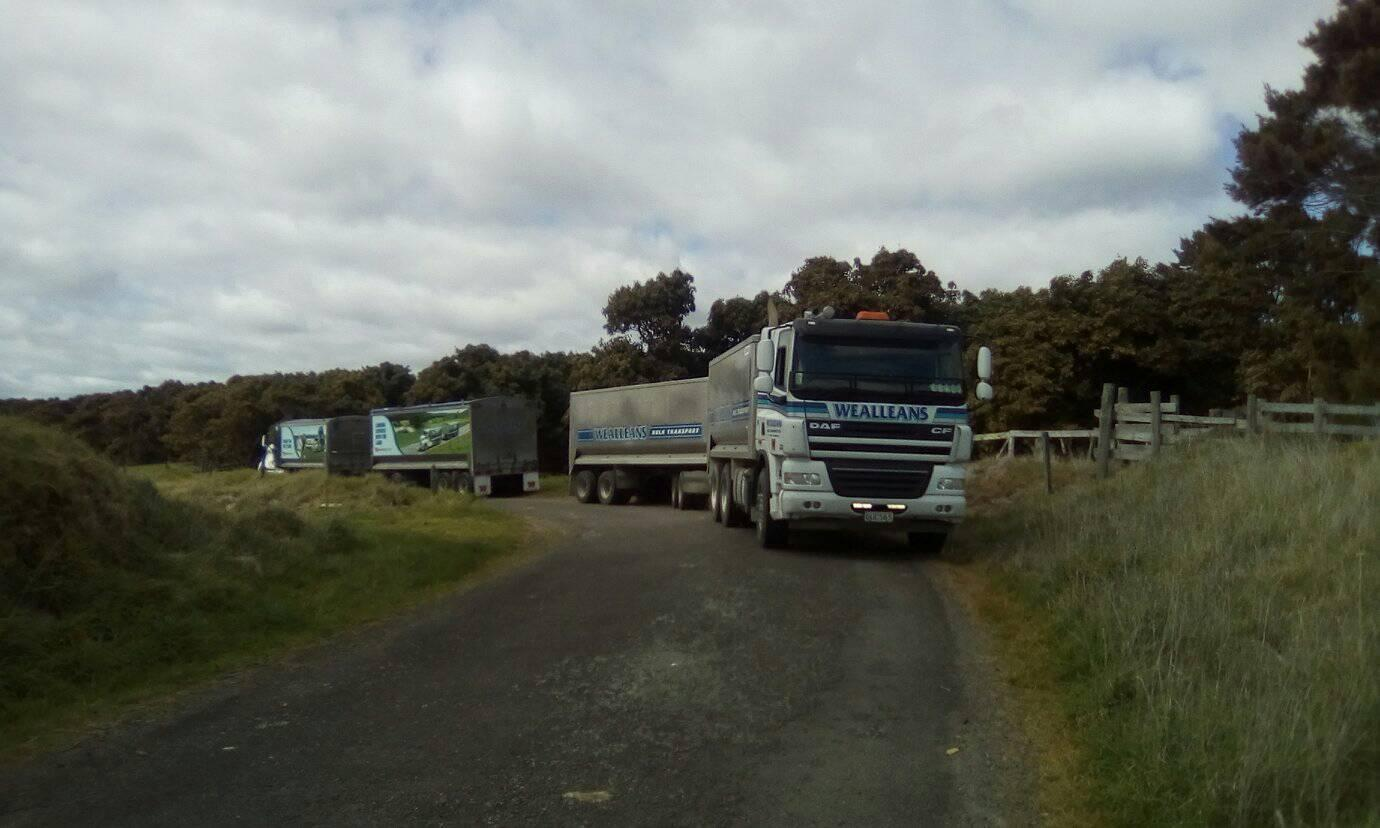
RHD DAF CF in New Zealand. Same cab as Foden Alpha, same chassis as Kenworth T401, same drivetrain as Kenworth T410. Paccar MX13 engine, Eaton-Fuller Road Ranger gearbox and Meritor diffs.

- DAF XF – All RHD versions are assembled at Leyland Trucks.
- DAF XG
- DAF XG+
- DAF XD
- DAF XB
