= DAF XG =

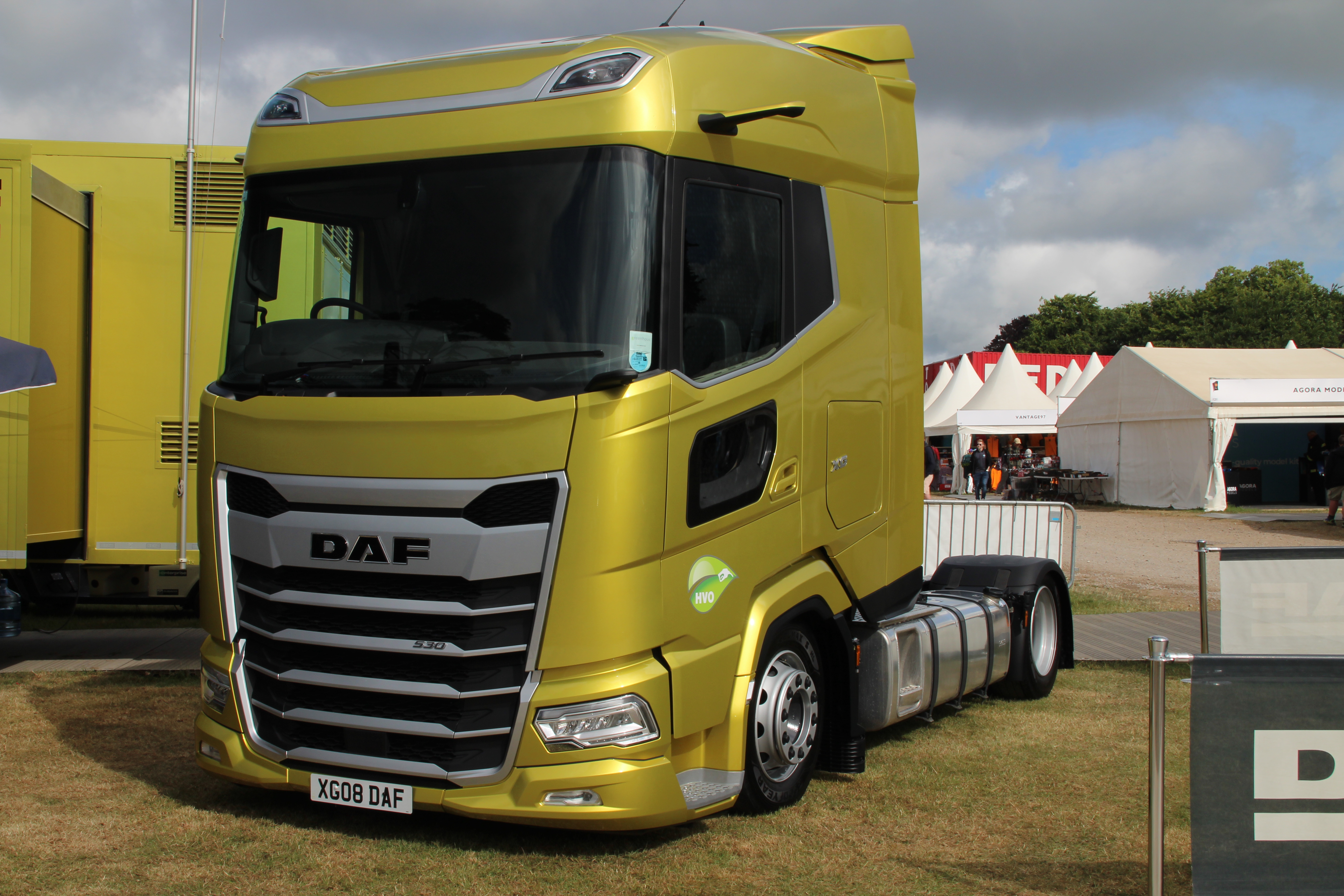
- New Generation DAF XG

Overview
- Type: Truck
- Manufacturer: DAF
- Production: 2021-present
- Assembly: Netherlands: Eindhoven (DAF Trucks); United Kingdom: Leyland (Leyland Trucks)

Body and chassis
- Class: Large Goods Vehicle
- Body style: Cab-Over; Tractor or Rigid Unit

Powertrain
- Engine: 10.8L Paccar MX-11; I6 (Turbocharged) 12.9L Paccar MX-13; I6 (Turbocharged)
- Transmission: 12-speed ZF TraXon Automatic

The DAF XG is a range of trucks produced by Dutch manufacturer DAF Trucks since 2021. The XG was released as part of the New Generation DAF series, alongside the NGD XF and NGD XG+, winning the International Truck of the Year Award in 2022.

== Drivetrain ==
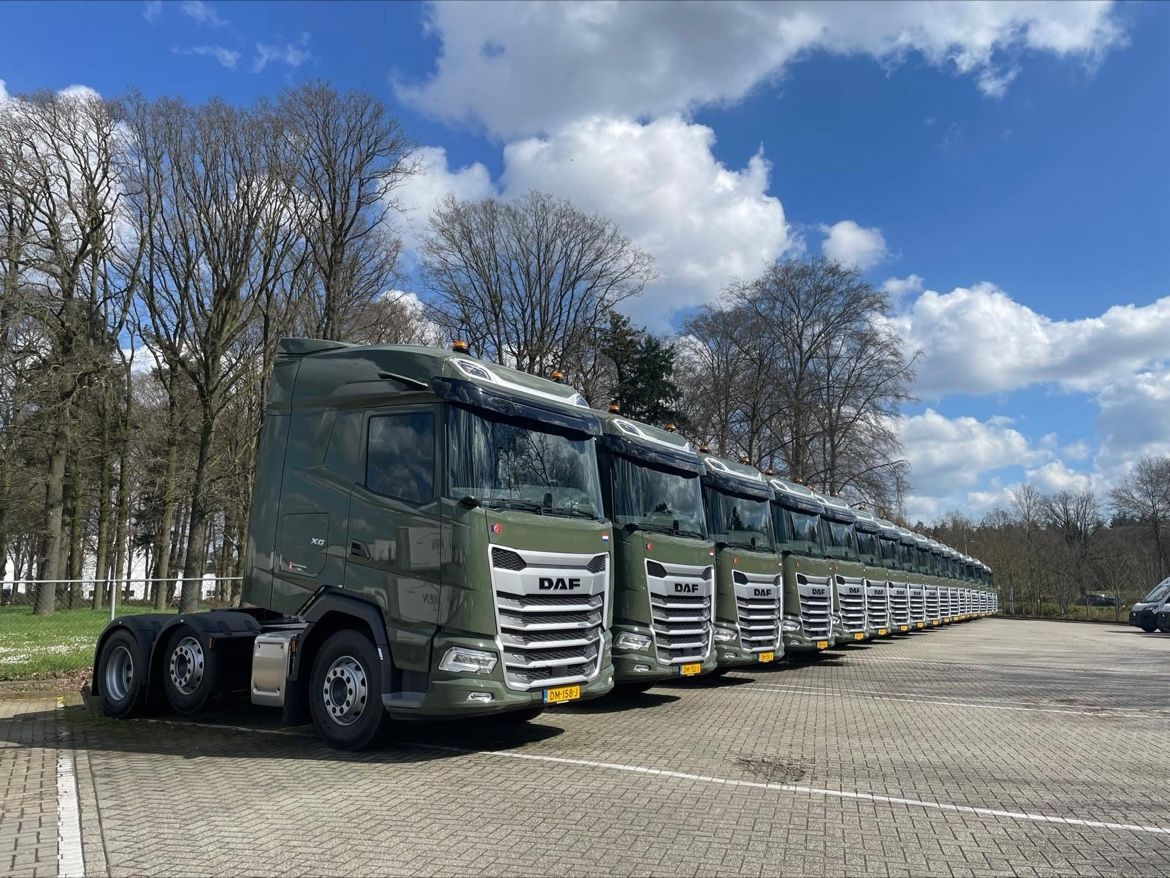
DAF XG Line-Up

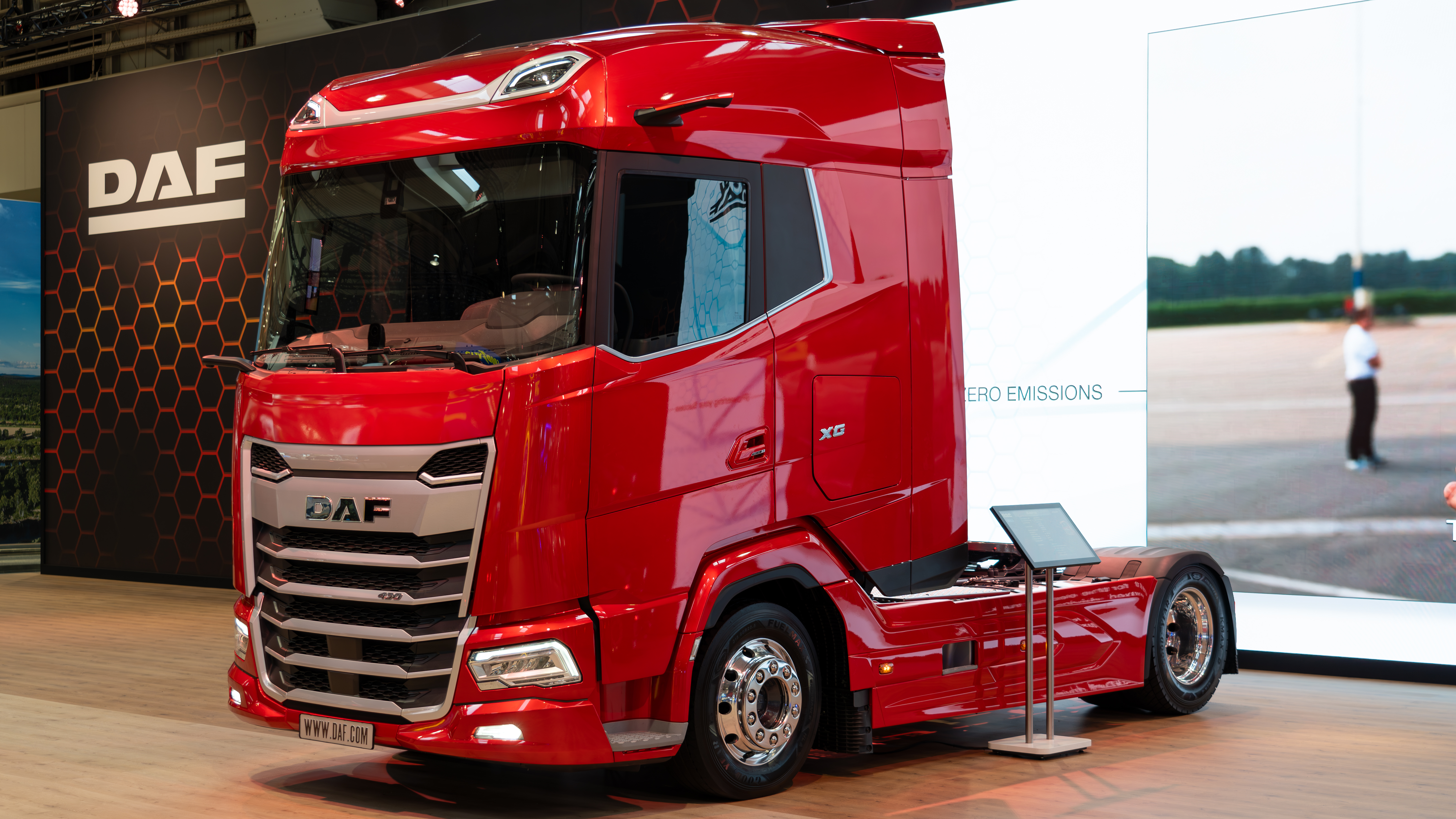
DAF XG 420 FT Low Deck

The DAF XG comes in multiple layouts including 4x2, 6x2 and 6x4, rigid or tractor-only and support taglifts and midlifts. The XG tractor units can also be purchased with a 17.5 inch midlift axle to allow for extra weight saving and efficiency.

The XG is only available with an automatic ZF TraXon 12-speed gearbox and factory-limited to 90km/h (56mph). DAF do allow for unlocking to 100km/h (62mph) with software changes.

The XG range is exclusively available with Paccar MX-series engines, both Inline-6, with either Euro 3 (MX-13 only), Euro 5 or Euro 6 emissions standards. The NGD XG does not support an electric drivetrain from factory.

== Cab Design ==
The DAF XG is the middle-ground between the New Generation XF and DAF's flagship truck, the XG+. The cab equals the XG+ in length at 2690mm but has a lower overall height of 2025-2075mm of standing room (versus 2145-2195mm).

The New Generation cabs are longer than previous models, allowed by new European laws, and claim to be the optimal vehicle design. This also introduces DAF's Air Fenders and Aero Seals in order to increase fuel efficiency by up to 10%.

== Safety ==
The XG can be optioned with DAF's Digital Vision System or regular main and wide-angle mirrors. The DAF Digital Vision System (DDVS) advertises enhanced indirect vision and an optimal view in all conditions. When opting for DDVS, a corner-view camera can be installed, replacing the front and kerb mirrors. As well as the improved efficiency of DAF's commercial vehicles, the Digital Vision System helps to meet the Direct Vision Standards (DVS) at 3-Star on the XG to meet 2024 requirements.

The New Generation XG also brings a kerb-view window in the lower half of the passenger-side door, which, when paired with DDVS; their large windscreen; and low belt-lines, helps to add to their safety claims and qualify for the 2024 DVS requirements.

The XG comes with their first-in-market suite of Advanced Driver Assistance Systems, including compatibility with additional cameras, breathalysers, Advanced Emergency Braking and other camera/sensor assists.
