= Mack Magnum =

Overview
- Manufacturer: Mack Trucks Australia
- Also called: "The Block of Flats"
- Production: Australia/New Zealand
- Designer: Renault

Body and chassis
- Class: B Double and Single Prime Mover
- Body style: Truck (cab over engine)
- Related: Renault Magnum

Powertrain
- Engine: Cummins 580 hp Signature DOHC/Mack E Tech E7 454hp
- Transmission: 18 spd Roadranger (manual)

Chronology
- Predecessor: Mack Ultraliner II

The Mack Magnum was a heavy-duty truck that was produced and manufactured from 1999 to 2003 by Mack Trucks Australia, a division of Volvo. It consisted of a Renault Magnum cab and chassis, with an all American Drive line including a Roadranger 18-speed transmission and had either Rockwell or Dana drive axles. Although a 454 hp Mack engine was an option. This truck was not "replaced" by the Mack Quantum, as both were sold alongside each other, the former being a premium heavy-duty truck, the latter the smaller lighter less expensive model. Its popularity waned quickly in Australia due to electrical problems and parts availability issues and it was removed from Mack Australia's lineup after only five years.

== See also ==
- Mack Trucks
- List of Mack Trucks products
