= Renault Trucks T =

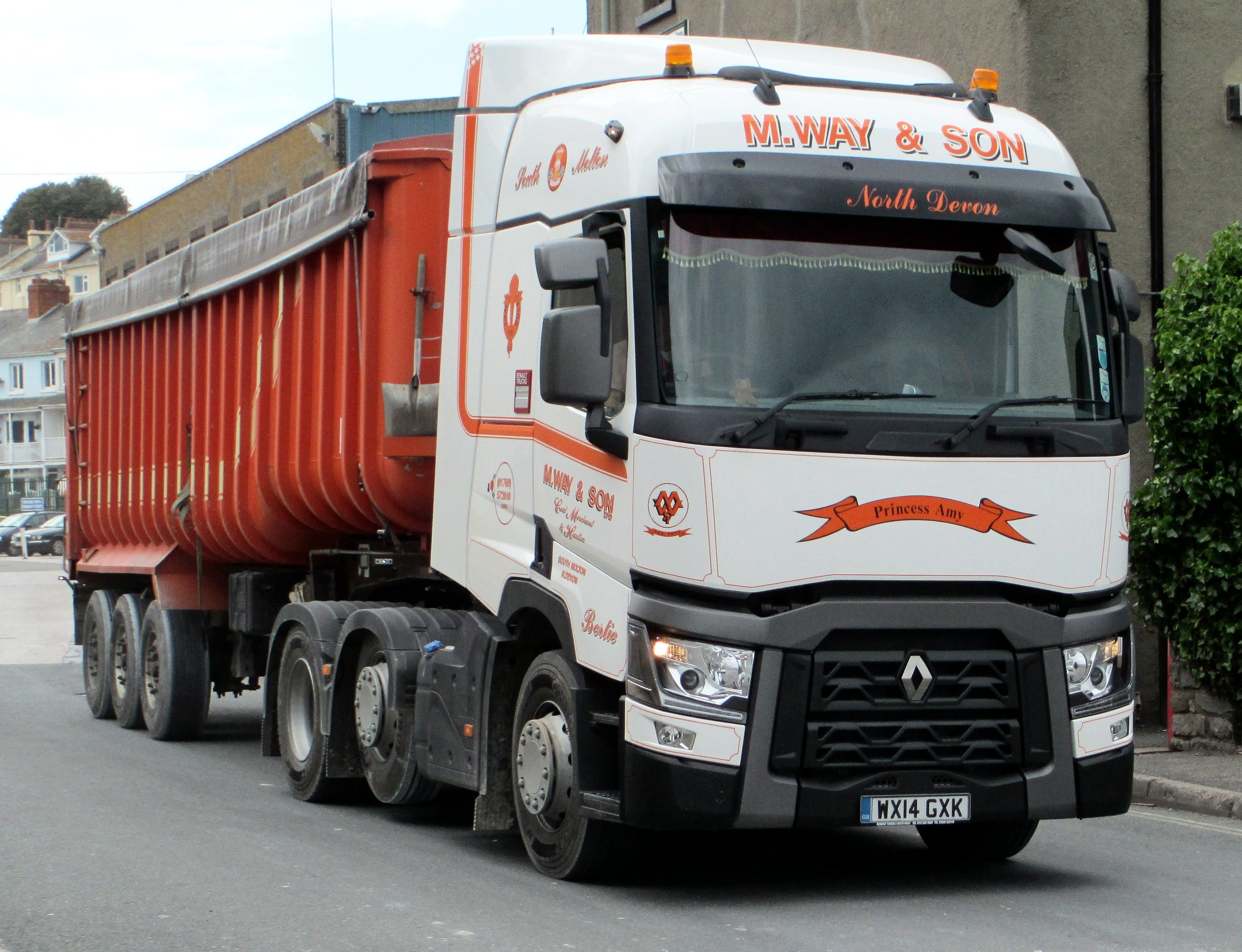

Overview
- Manufacturer: Renault Trucks
- Also called: Renault Trucks C Road
- Production: 2013–present
- Assembly: Bourg-en-Bresse, France; Shah Alam, Malaysia (CKD)
- Designer: Hervé Bertrand

Body and chassis
- Class: Heavy truck
- Body style: COE: Day Cab; Night & Day Cab; Sleeper Cab; High Sleeper Cab

Powertrain
- Engine: Straight-six engine: DTI 11 (11 L); DTI 13 (13 L)
- Transmission: 12 speed automated (Optidriver)

Chronology
- Predecessor: Renault Premium/Renault Magnum

The Renault Trucks T is a range of heavy-duty trucks manufactured by Renault Trucks. The truck was presented on 11 June 2013 with a show called R/Evolution and was introduced at the end of 2013, being the first from a new line of vehicles for the company. An electric version was introduced in 2023.

== Design ==
The last of the major European manufacturers to introduce a Euro VI compliant vehicle, Renault allowed chief designer Hervé Bertrand to design a vehicle. Although using some common parts from the new Volvo FH series, the design was seen as a step-forward inspiration from the Renault Magnum, with a front grille area was inspired by a conveyor belt and a unique design cab area, designed for long distance international trunk routes.

== Characteristics ==
The Renault Trucks T includes the robotised Optidriver transmission as standard, improved aerodynamics to reduce fuel consumption and new comfort and security features.

=== Engines ===
The T offers two Euro VI six-cylinder engines, the 11 L DTI 11 (with a power output of 380, 430 and 460hp) and the 13 L DTI 13 (440, 480 and 520hp).

== Safety ==
Euro NCAP test results Renault Trucks T 4x2 Tractor Unit (2024)
Test	Score
Overall:	4 /5 stars
Safe driving	72%
Crash avoidance	70%
Post crash	80%

Euro NCAP test results Renault Trucks T 4x2 Tractor Unit (2025)
Test	Score
Overall:	4 /5 stars
Safe driving	72%
Crash avoidance	76%
Post crash	80%

Euro NCAP test results Renault Trucks T 6x2 Rigid (2025)
Test	Score
Overall:	4 /5 stars
Safe driving	72%
Crash avoidance	76%
Post crash	80%

== Awards ==
On 23 September 2014, the Renault Trucks T was voted International Truck of the Year 2015 during the International Motor Show Germany in Hanover.
