= Direct Vision Standard =

The Direct Vision Standard is a measure of how much HGV drivers can see from their cab directly (without the use of mirrors or video cameras). Since October 2024, Transport for London has required all HGVs over 12 tonnes entering London to have either a three-star rating or to fit the Progressive Safe System.

The standard began in March 2021, when vehicles were required to have a rating of at least one star. To meet the one-star standard, a driver needs to be able to see someone's head and shoulders from within an acceptable distance. For the one-star rating, that corresponds to 4.5m at the side and 2m in front. The scheme is enforced 24/7 and permits ware issued free of charge. Fines of £550 are issued to any vehicle entering London without a permit, with drivers fined £130.

== Impact ==
TfL said in June 2022 that nearly 200,000 DVS permits had been issued, with 94% of HGVs operating with a safety permit. The number of serious injuries involving HGVs fell from 48 in 2017 to 17 in 2021.

== Reaction ==
Some haulage companies complained that the new standard placed a burden on their companies because they would have to contact the manufacturer to find out their safety rating. However, TfL's head of delivery planning, Christina Calderato, said "The disproportionately high number of HGVs involved in fatal collisions with pedestrians and cyclists is a tragedy. This is why we’ve worked closely with the freight and logistics industry and vulnerable road user groups to develop the Direct Vision Standard and HGV Safety Standard Permit Scheme. Together we hope that these new safety measures will help to save many lives in the future."
