= Renault Magnum =

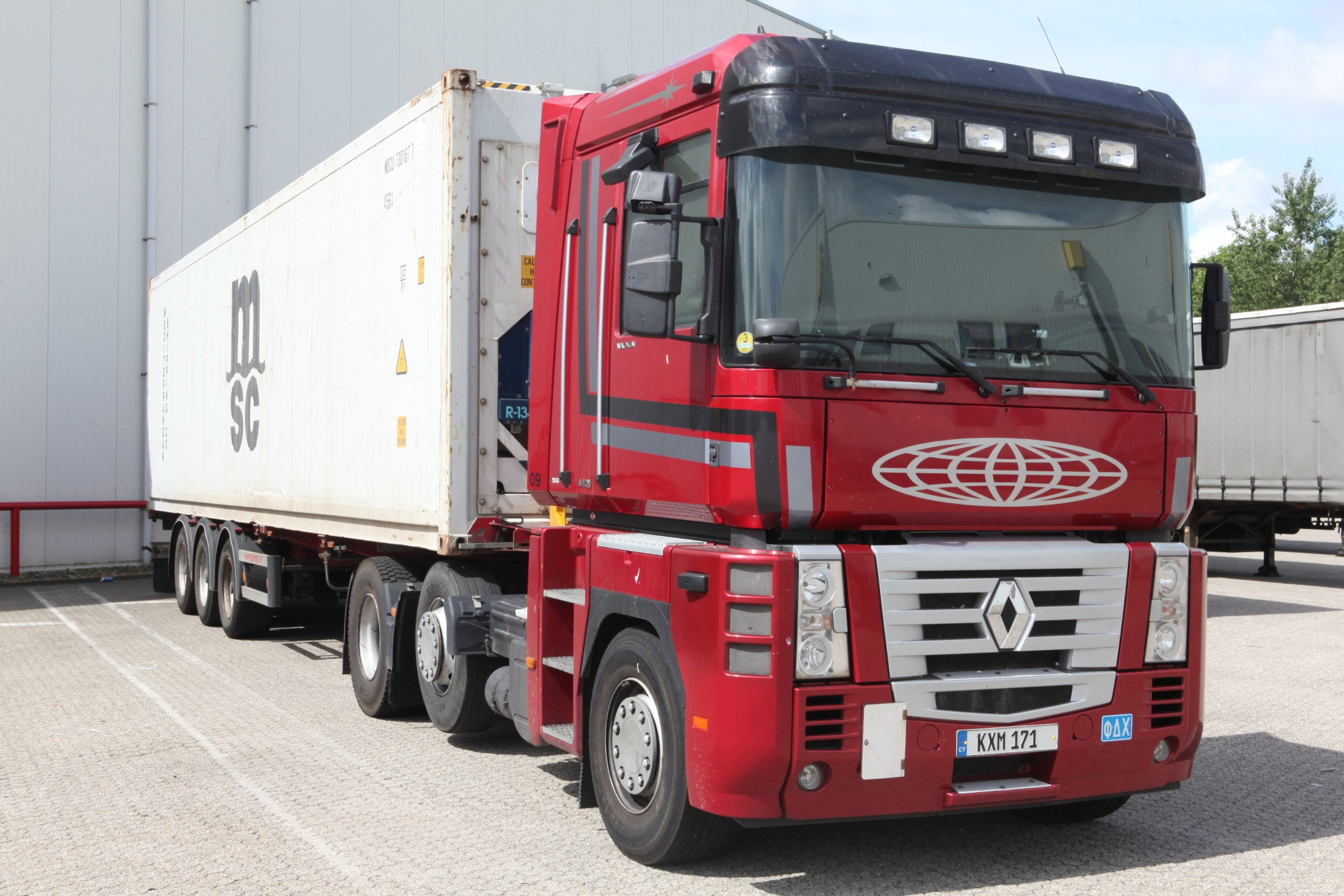

Overview
- Manufacturer: Renault Trucks
- Also called: Mack Magnum (Australia)
- Production: 1990–2013
- Assembly: Bourg-en-Bresse, France
- Designer: Marcello Gandini (1982)

Body and chassis
- Class: Truck
- Body style: Truck (cab over engine)
- Related: Mack Magnum

Powertrain
- Engine: Mack V8, Mack L6, Renault L6, Volvo L6
- Transmission: Renault B18 (manual/automatic)

Chronology
- Successor: Renault Trucks T high

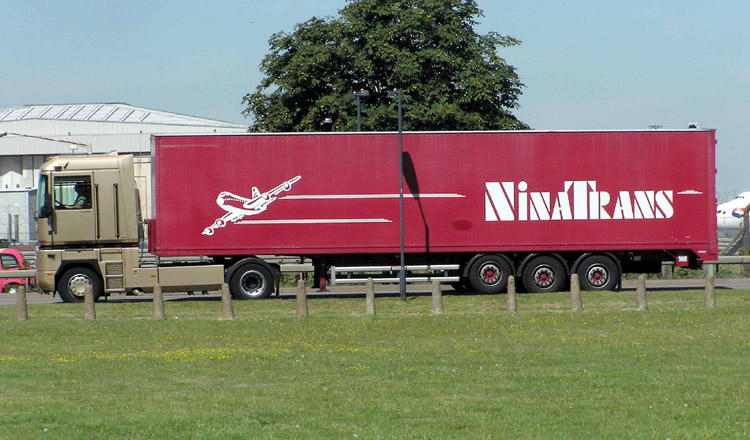
Renault Magnum with a semi-trailer in London

The Renault Magnum is a heavy-duty truck that was produced by French manufacturer Renault Véhicules Industriels and later Renault Trucks (also part of Renault, now Volvo) from 1990 to 2013. The Magnum was available in articulated and rigid configurations; both configurations could be bought with a 6×2 or 4×2 drivetrain. The 6×4 is merely designed for heavy haulage uses.

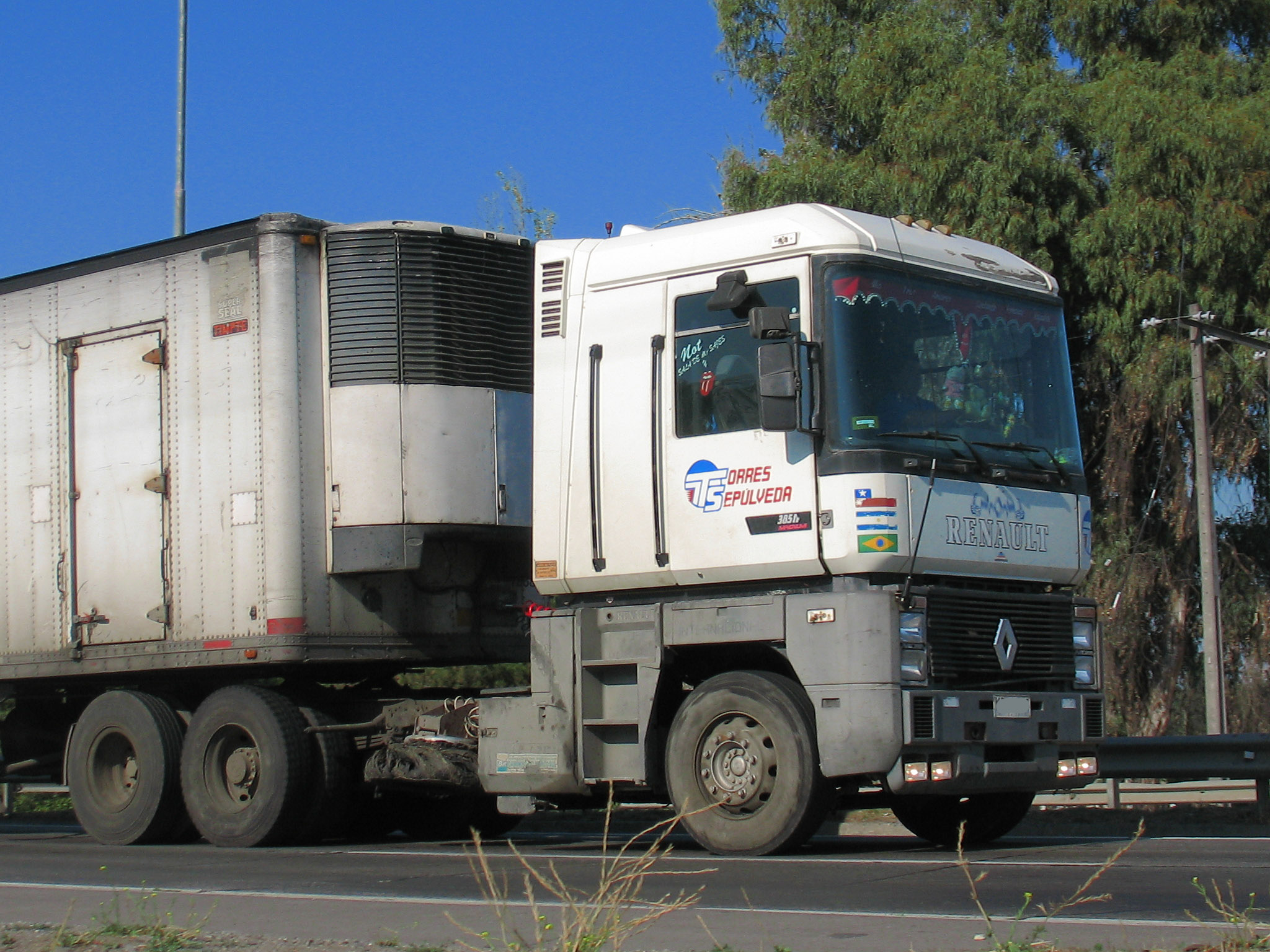
1992 Renault Magnum

First launched in 1990, the Magnum was awarded the "International Truck of the Year" in 1991.

The Magnum was featured in Top Gear S12 E01, when Jeremy Clarkson bought one for less than £5,000 in the Top Gear Lorry Challenge.

== History ==
In 1985, Renault presented a prototype truck, the VE 10, with special aerodynamics to reduce fuel consumption. The truck was launched as the Renault AE (for AErodynamic) in 1990, and notable for being the first modern truck with a completely flat cab floor and for having a mechanically separate cab and engine compartment, resulting in increased comfort inside the cab. The cab was designed by Marcello Gandini. Engines at launch were the AE 380 with a six-cylinder turbodiesel offering 279 kW (374 hp), and the AE500 with a 375 kW (503 hp) Mack V8 diesel. It was voted Truck of the Year 1991. Since 1997 the truck was marketed as Renault Magnum and the cab was redesigned, and new engines became available. In 1995, the VE 20 prototype was presented, giving a preview of the second generation Magnum.

In 2001, a major facelift was presented with a new cab designed by Xavier Allard, keeping its characteristic boxed shape and separate engine-cab model.

A few days after the presentation of its totally renewed range, in Lyon, Renault Trucks was getting ready to turn the page on the Renault Magnum. On Wednesday 26 June 2013, the keys to the last Magnum were presented to hauliers Robert Chabbert, at the Bourg-en-Bresse site, with a brand-new Renault Trucks T also present.

== Technical data ==
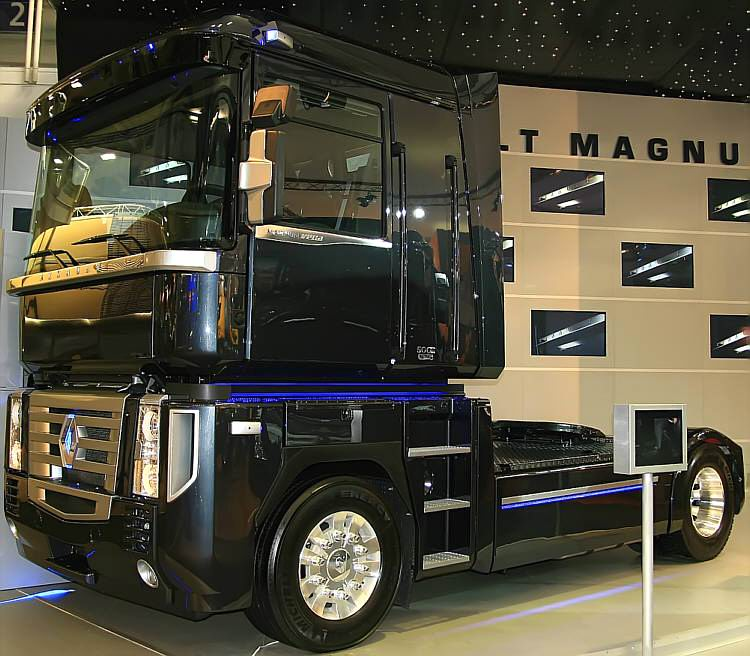
Renault Magnum VEGA DXI

=== Engine ===
The engine is derived from the 13L straight-six engine of the AB Volvo Group. Changes include new engine management and an injection system co-developed with Delphi.

The engine was available in the following configurations:

Power	Torque	Max torque range
324 kW (440 PS)	2,200 N⋅m (1,623 lb⋅ft)	1020-1400 rpm
353 kW (480 PS)	2,400 N⋅m (1,770 lb⋅ft)	1030-1400 rpm
382 kW (520 PS)	2,550 N⋅m (1,881 lb⋅ft)	1050-1430 rpm

=== Transmission ===
The transmission offered as standard is a ZF servoshift air-assisted 16-speed manual. The Optidrive II 12 speed automated transmission with 4 reverse speeds was offered as an option. This transmission could also be used in manual operation mode.

== See also ==
- Renault Trucks
- Mack Magnum
