= DAF LF =

DAF XB (formerly DAF LF until 2023)
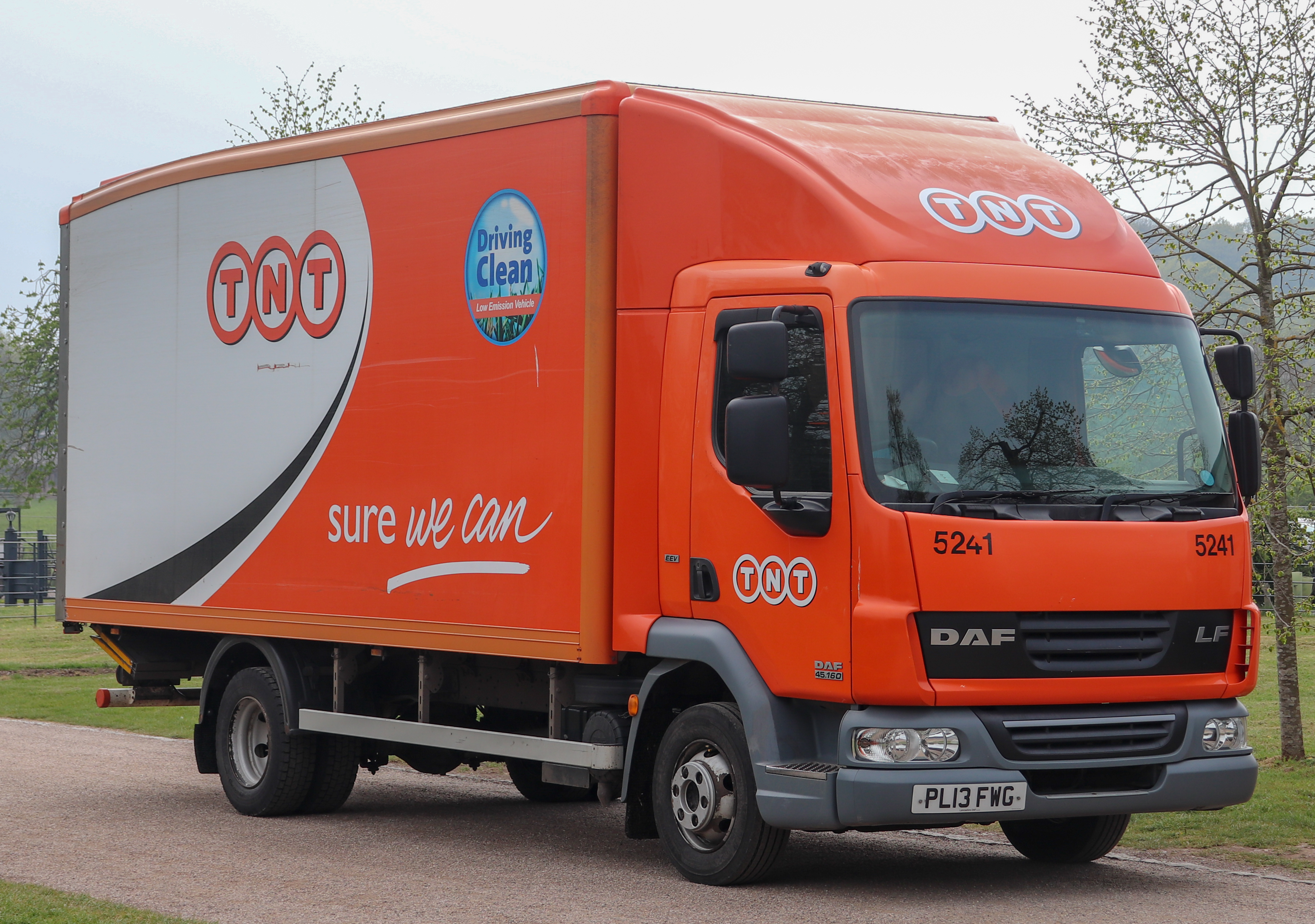
- 2013 DAF LF

Overview
- Manufacturer: DAF Trucks
- Production: 2001-present (LF renamed to XB on October 6, 2023)
- Assembly: UK: Leyland (Leyland Trucks); Taiwan: FASC; Belgium: Ghent (Volvo Trucks)

Body and chassis
- Class: Small

Powertrain
- Engine: Cummins B Series engine (ISB3.9 & ISB5.9 in 2001-2006 models, ISB4.5 & ISB6.7 in 2007-present models); Cummins ISF3.8 (LF Hybrid)

Chronology
- Predecessor: DAF 45 & 55; Leyland Roadrunner
- Successor: DAF XB

The DAF XB (formerly DAF LF from 2001 to October 6, 2023) is a range of light/medium duty trucks produced by a Dutch manufacturer DAF Trucks. It is a redevelopment from the Leyland Roadrunner of 1984.

== Engine ==
The LF45 and LF55 are powered by Cummins B Series engines. The distribution truck and pickup versions of the LF45 use the 4 cylinder, LF45s with powered equipment such as bin lorries and vacuum tankers use the 6 cylinder, and all LF55s use the 6 cylinder due to their increased size and weight.

== Design ==
The XB shares its cab design with the Renault Midlum and the Volvo FL. It is also the base for medium duty trucks for Kenworth and Peterbilt.

== History ==
The LF won the International Truck of the Year 2002 award. In 2024, the LF was discontinued and replaced by the new DAF XB.

== Safety ==
Euro NCAP test results DAF XB 4x2 Rigid (2026)
Test	Score
Overall:	3 /5 stars
Safe driving	66%
Crash avoidance	36%
Post crash	80%

== Gallery ==
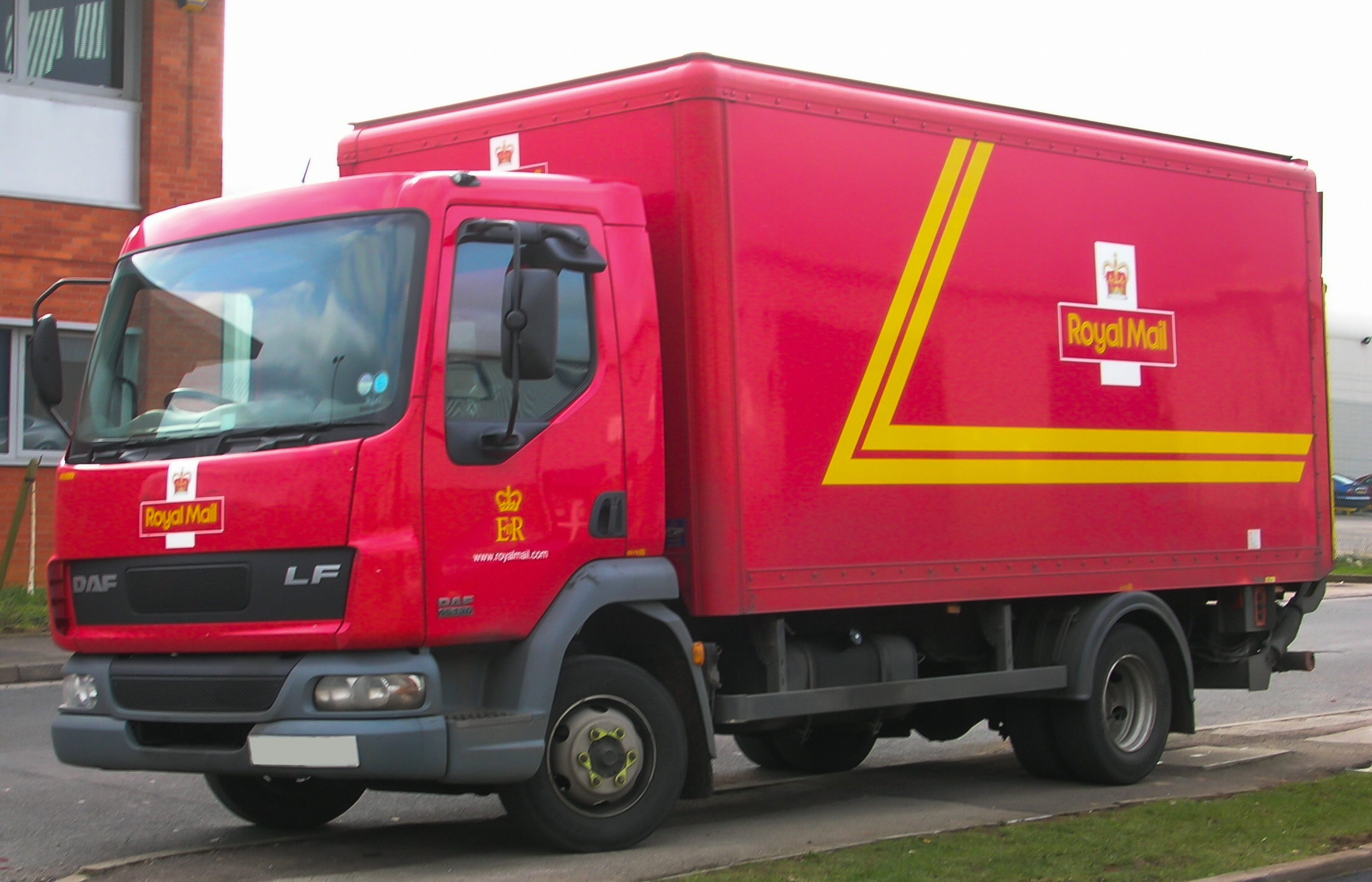
2005 DAF LF

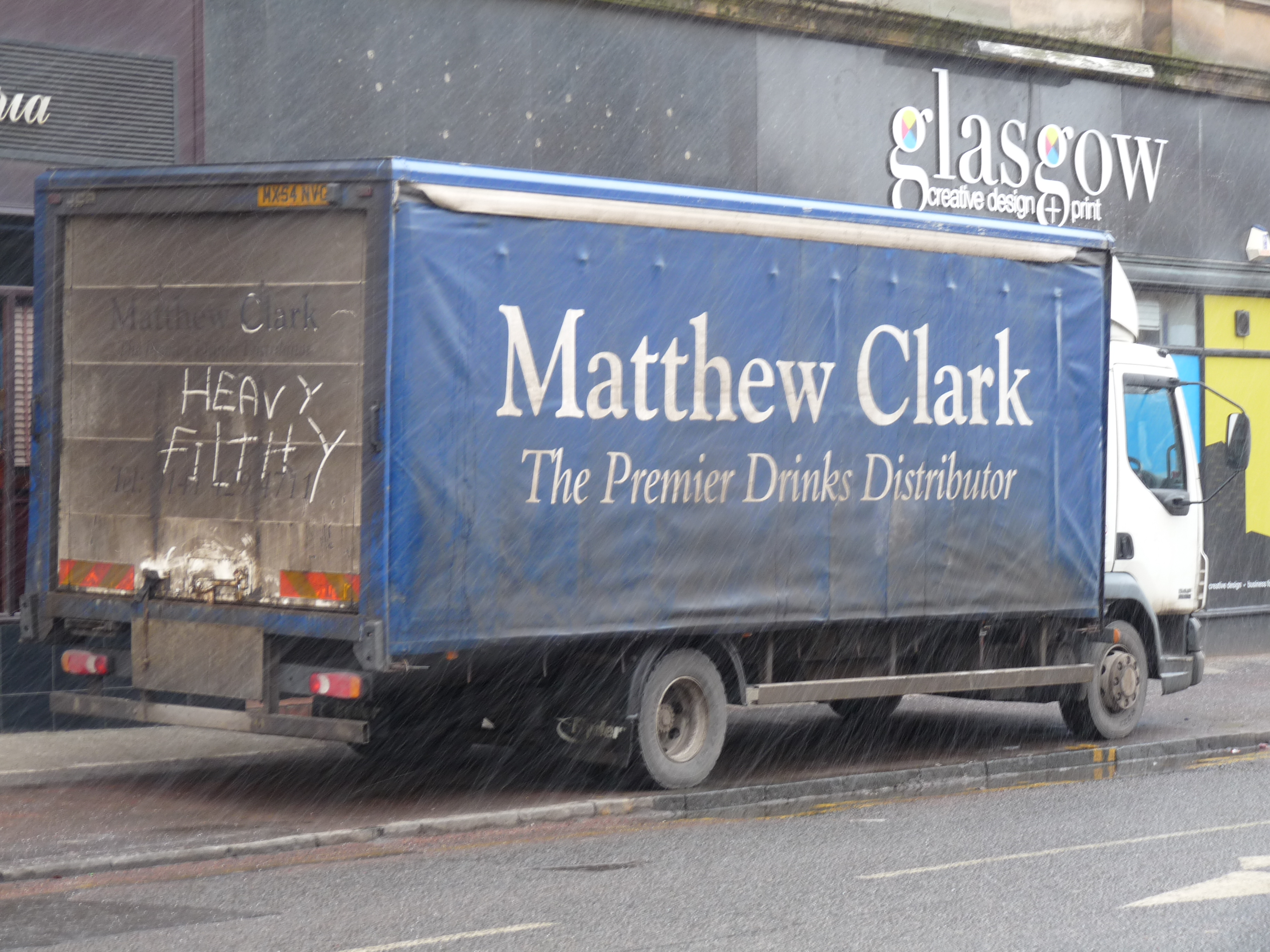
Rear of a DAF LF

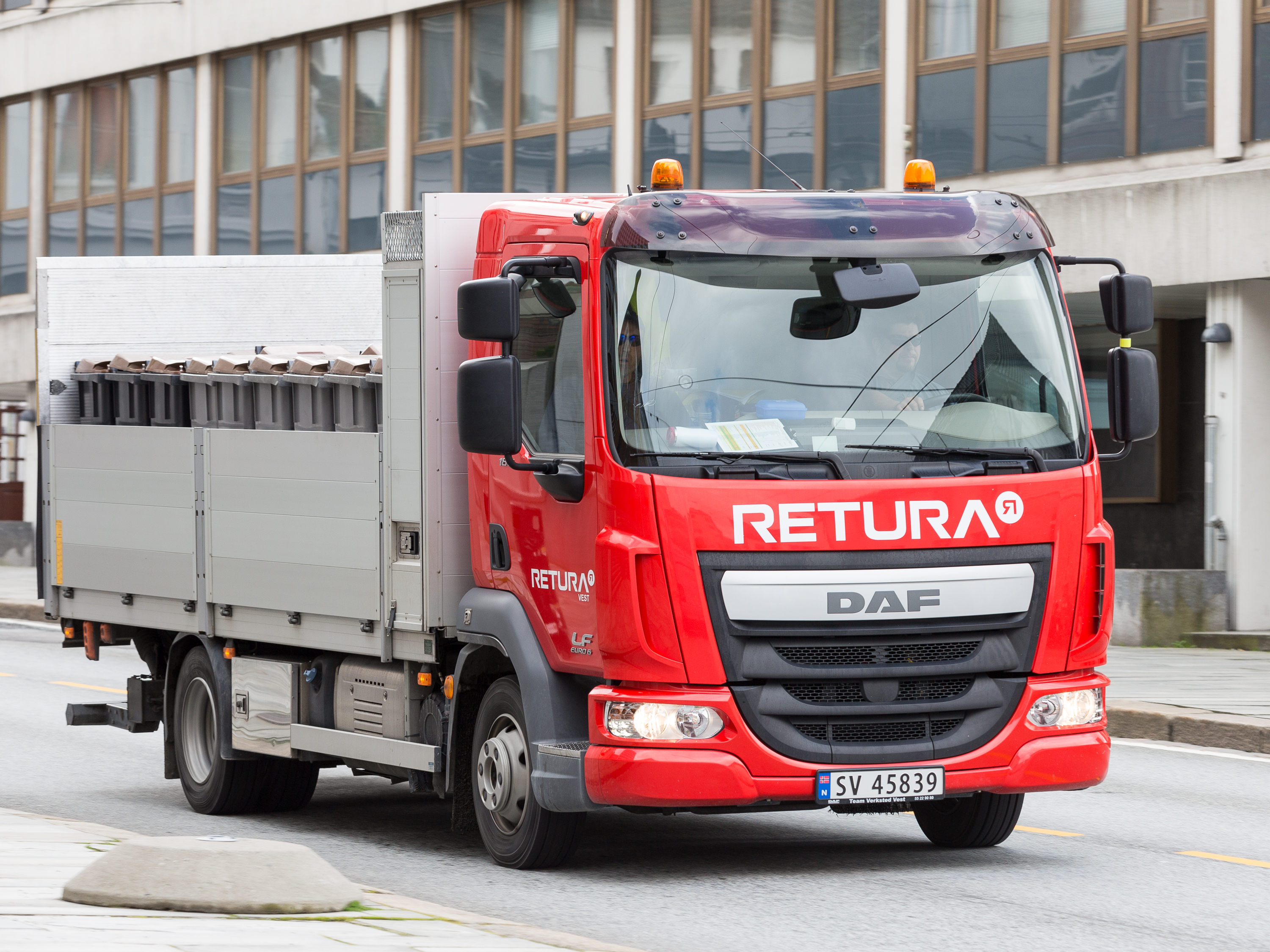
DAF LF Euro (2013 version)

== LF Hybrid ==
In September 2010, DAF introduced a hybrid version of the LF45 at the IAA 2010 in Hannover. The LF Hybrid has a 118 kilowatt diesel engine combined with a 44 kW brushless electric motor, which has a permanent magnet and is placed in line between the clutch and the automatic transmission. The electric motor is powered by 96 lithium-ion batteries of 3.4 Volt each, weighing a total of 100 kg. The battery pack allows the truck to drive for about 2 kilometres with the diesel engine turned off and to store energy from braking for future use.
