= DAF CF =

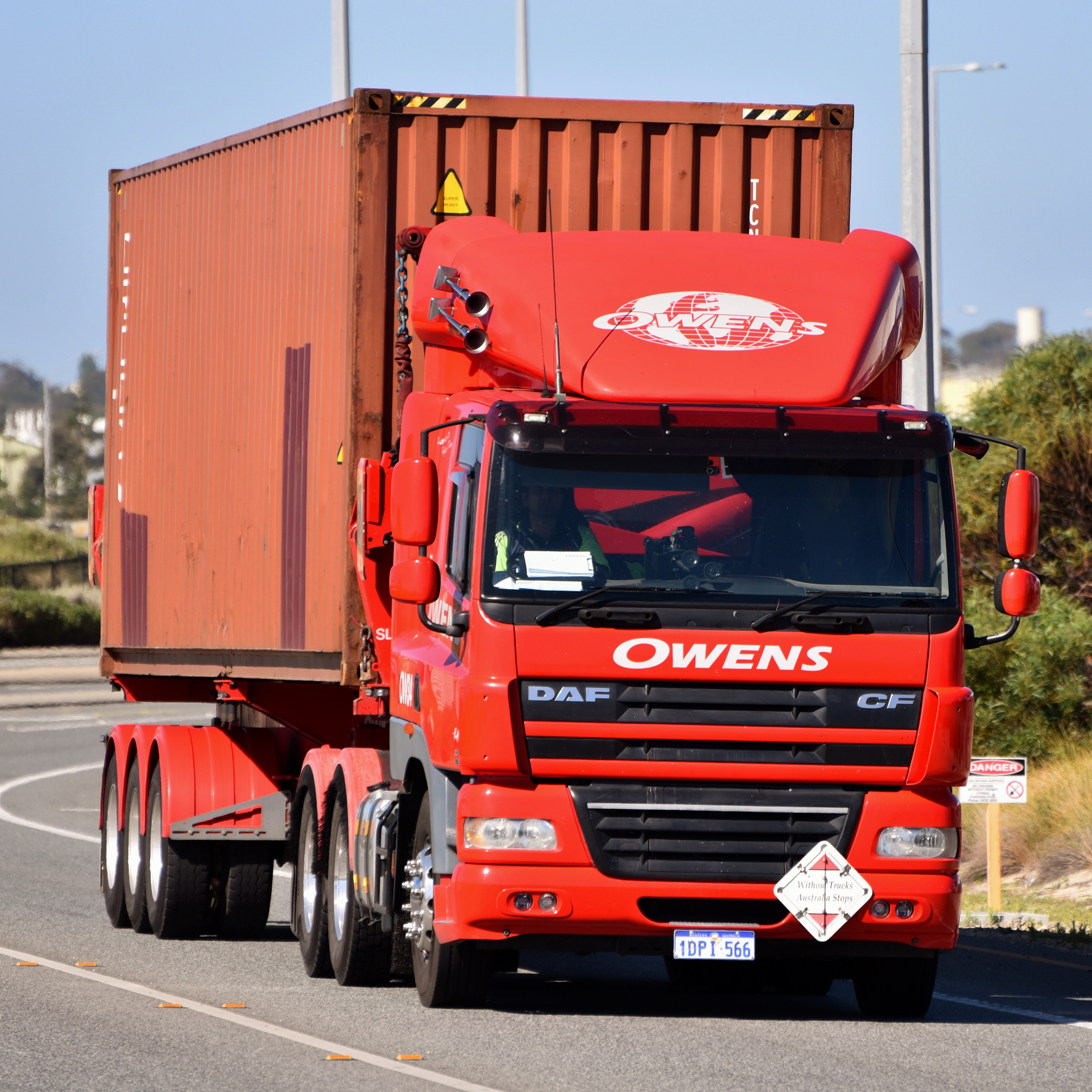

Overview
- Manufacturer: DAF
- Also called: DAF 65, 75 & 85 (1992–1997); DAF 65, 75 & 85 CF (1998–2000)
- Production: 1992–2024
- Assembly: Netherlands: Eindhoven (LHD); UK: Leyland (Leyland Trucks; RHD)

Body and chassis
- Class: Truck
- Body style: Truck (cab over engine)
- Related: DAF XF; DAF LF

Powertrain
- Engine: 11.6 L WS 242L and 268L I6 (gasoline)
- Transmission: 16-speed ZF Ecosplit 16S 150; 16-speed Eaton Twin Splitter 126.12A; DAF (manual/automatic); 18-speed Eaton Fuller Road Ranger; Alison 2500 and 3000

Chronology
- Predecessor: DAF F218 series Leyland Constructor
- Successor: DAF XD

The DAF CF is a range of trucks produced since 1992 by the Dutch truck manufacturer DAF Trucks NV. Originally launched as the 65, 75, and 85 series (from 1992 through 1997), they were renamed the CF range in 1998. Most left-hand drive DAF trucks are assembled in Eindhoven, while all right-hand drive units for the UK market are produced by Leyland Trucks. In 2024, the CF was discontinued and replaced by the new DAF XD.

== Military use ==
=== Belgium ===
In 2021 DAF was awarded a contract for the delivery and service of 879 military trucks for the Belgian army and the Medical Component of the Belgian Armed Forces. Of the vehicles ordered, 40% will be equipped with an armoured cab that will protect the crew during military operations. DAF will work together with Tatra Trucks to deliver the military trucks, which is planned to take place between 2022 and 2025. The trucks will be based on the DAF CF model and will include both 4x4 and 8×8 versions.

- 636 4×4 trucks for general transport tasks
- 243 8×8 trucks for specific applications.

A second order for 9 tractor trucks was made in 2021.

== Gallery ==
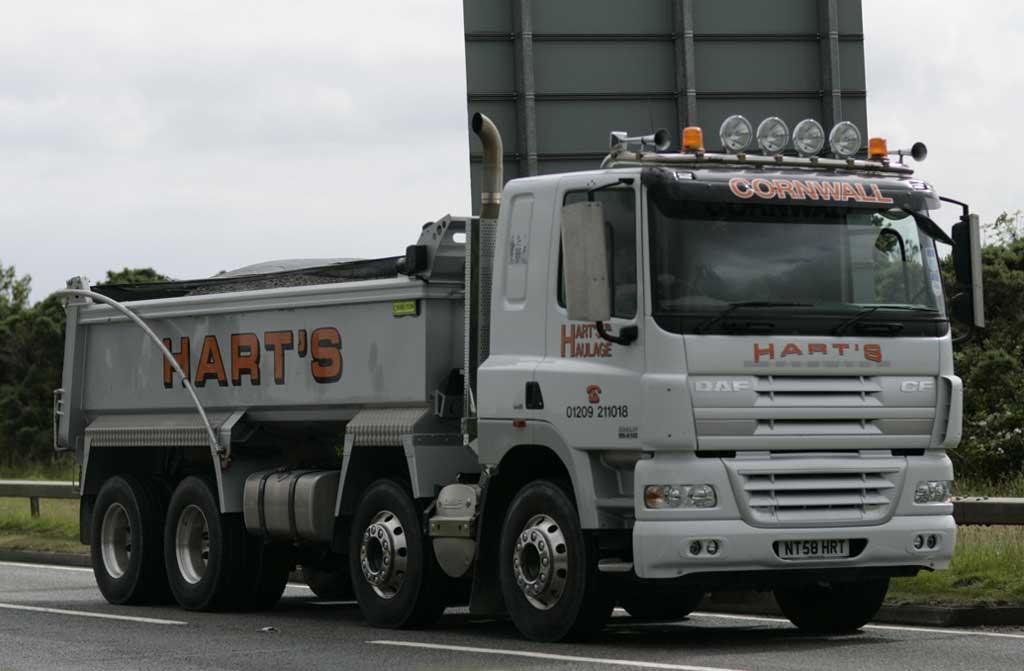
Hart's Haulage DAF CF Tipper truck

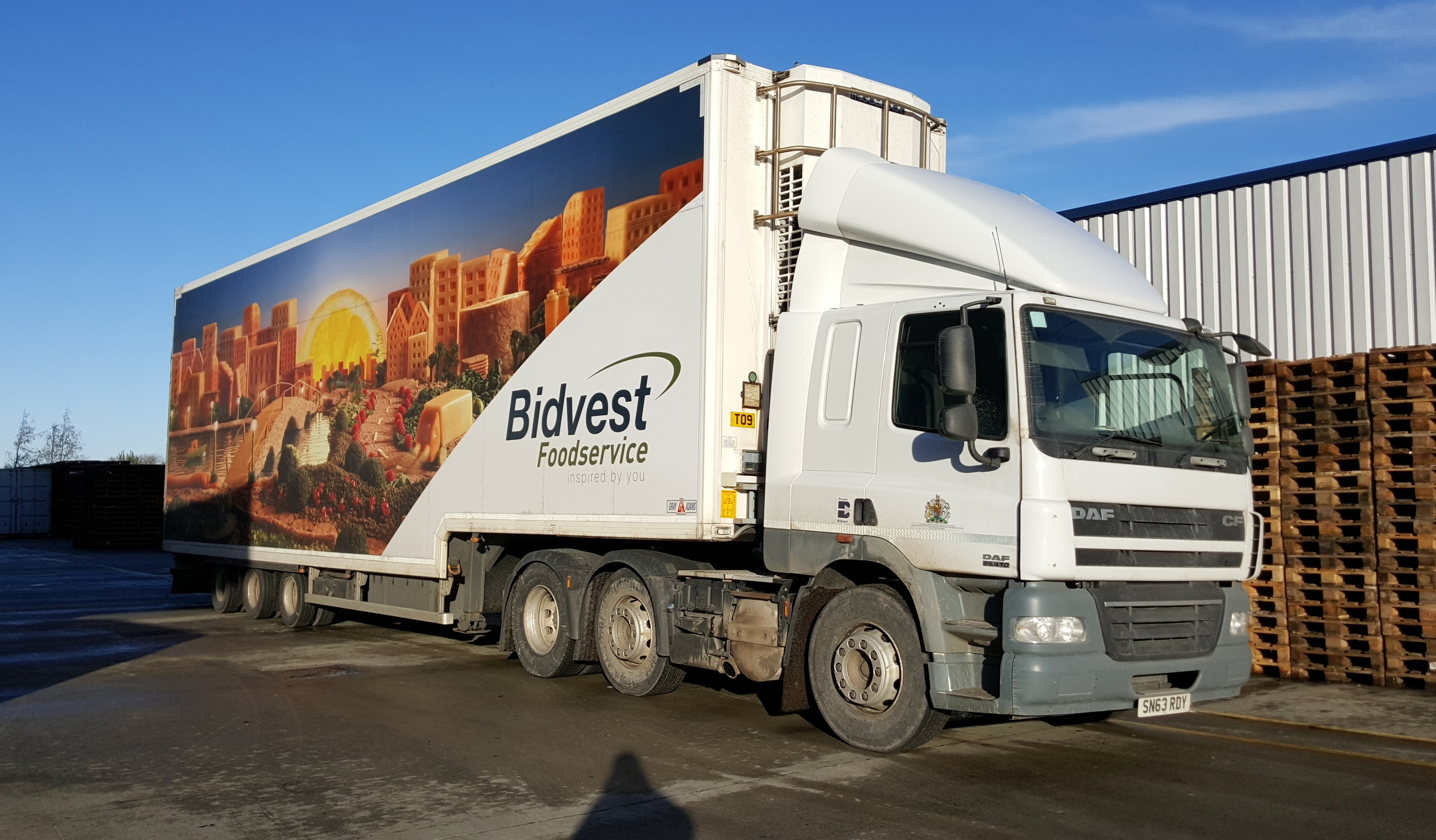
DAF CF as food service truck

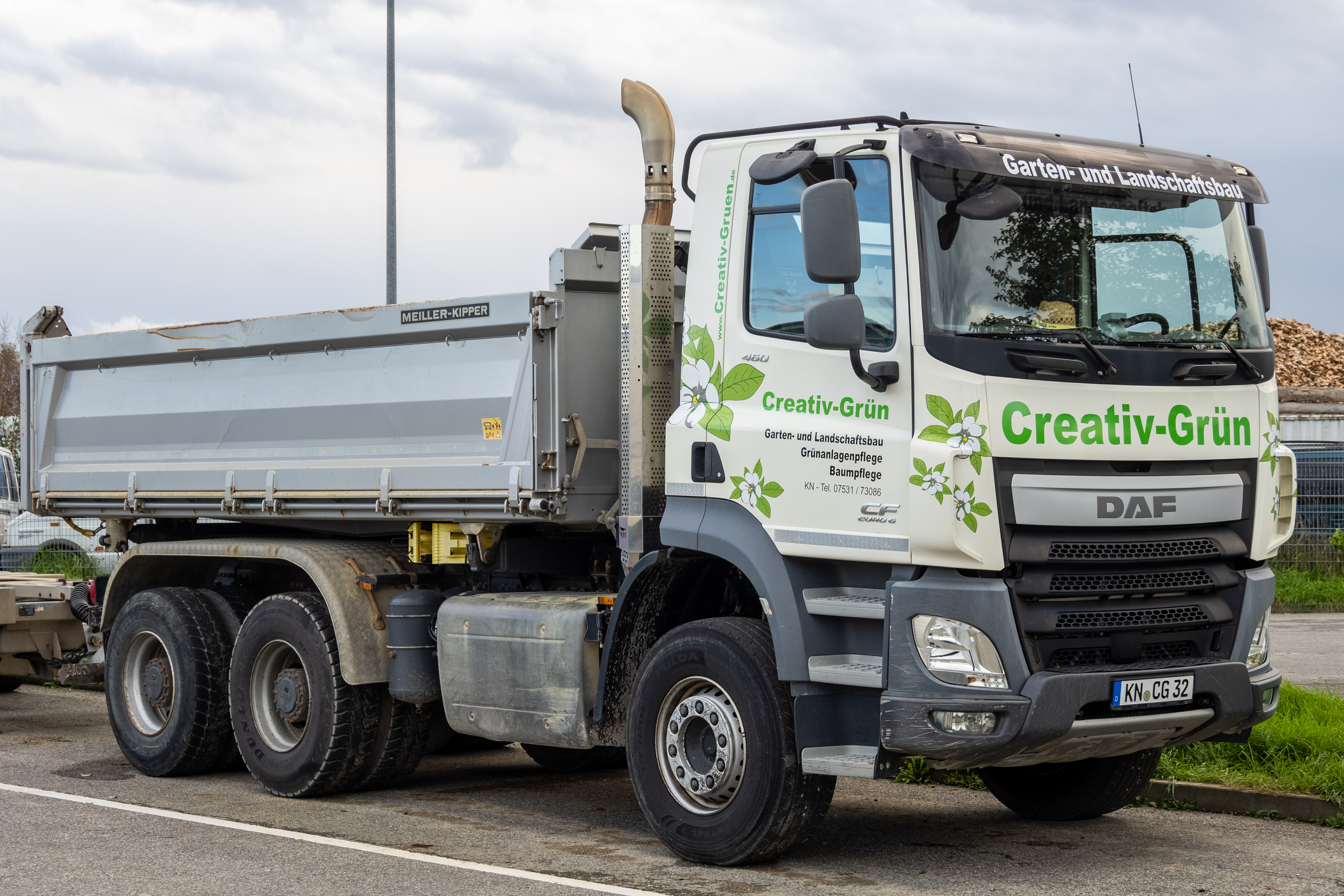
DAF CF 460 tipper truck in Germany

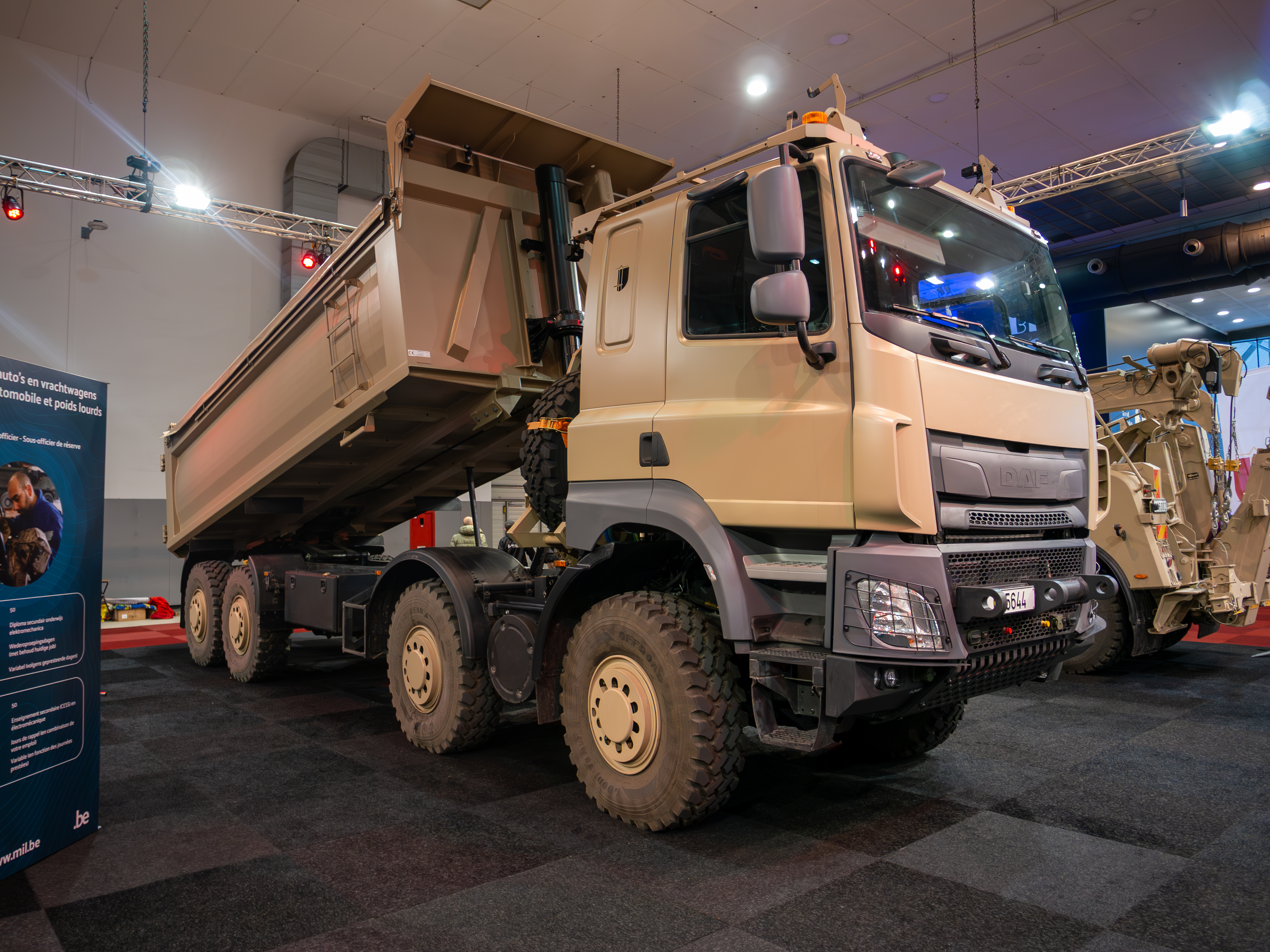
Belgian Army CF 8×8
