= Volvo PV444/544 =

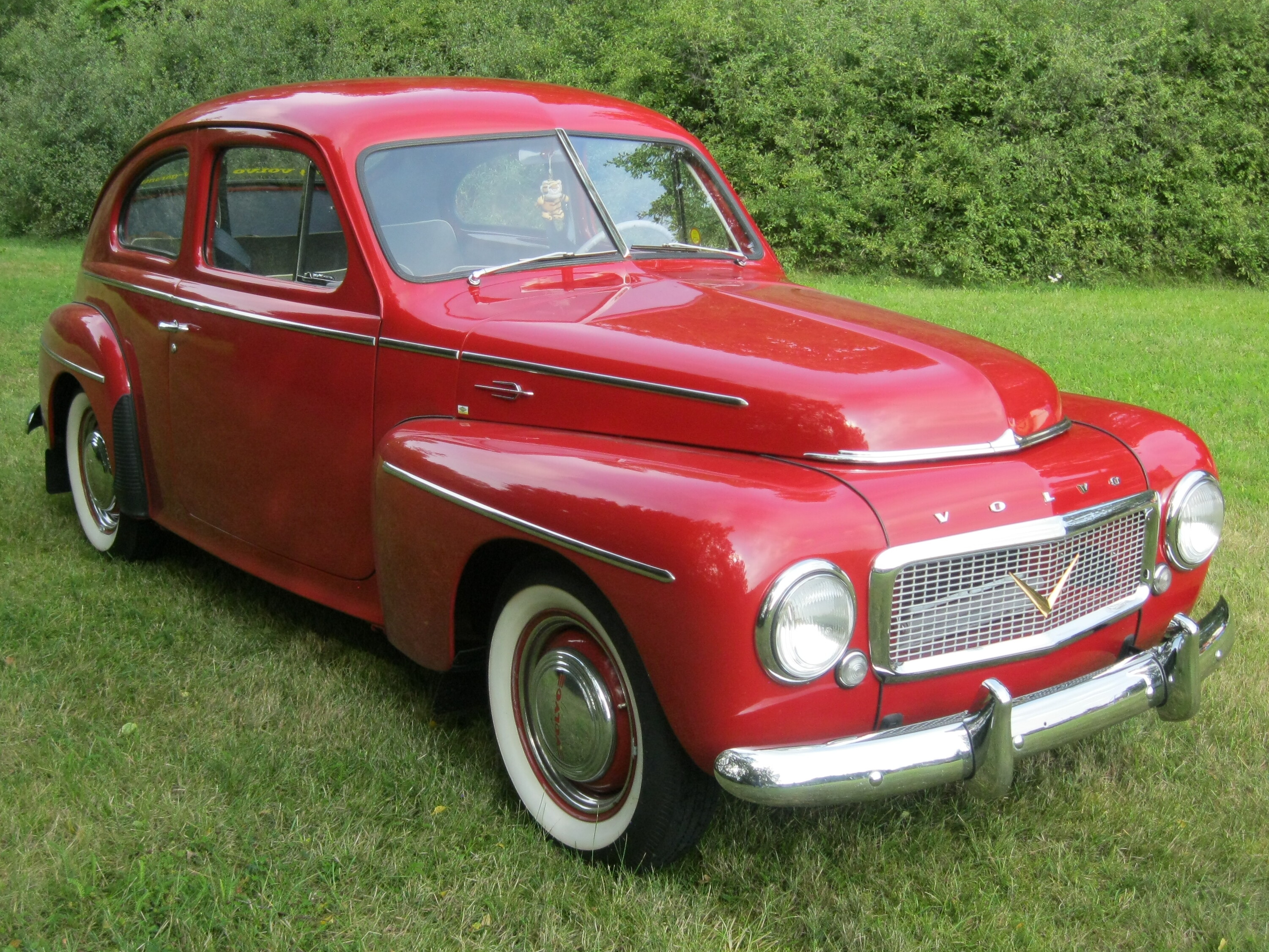
- 1957 Volvo PV 444 LS

Overview
- Manufacturer: Volvo Personvagnar
- Production: 1944–1965
- Assembly: Sweden: Lundby, Gothenburg; Sweden: Torslanda (Torslandaverken); Canada: Halifax, Nova Scotia (VHA); Chile: Arica (DiVolvo)
- Designer: Helmer Petterson

Body and chassis
- Body style: 2-door fastback

Chronology
- Successor: Volvo Amazon

The Volvo PV is a series of two-door, four-passenger car models — the PV444 and the PV544 — made by Volvo from 1947 to 1965. During World War II's early stages, Volvo decided that a new, smaller car that could deliver good fuel economy would assure the company's future. A raw materials shortage during the war drove home the point that an automobile should be smaller, and also complicated Volvo's ability to mass-produce the product. In 1944, when the car was finally introduced to a car-hungry public, response was very positive and orders poured in from the Swedish population. It was another three years though, until 1947, before series production began.

The PV quickly earned a reputation for being strong and rugged, although the design was considered outdated from early on. The PV also competed successfully, in the American SCCA class but also internationally, with a second-hand PV544 memorably winning the Safari Rally in 1965.

No PV 544 were produced in 1966. Last production was October 1965, some were sold in 1966 and titled as such, but last model year is 1965.

== PV444 ==
PV444
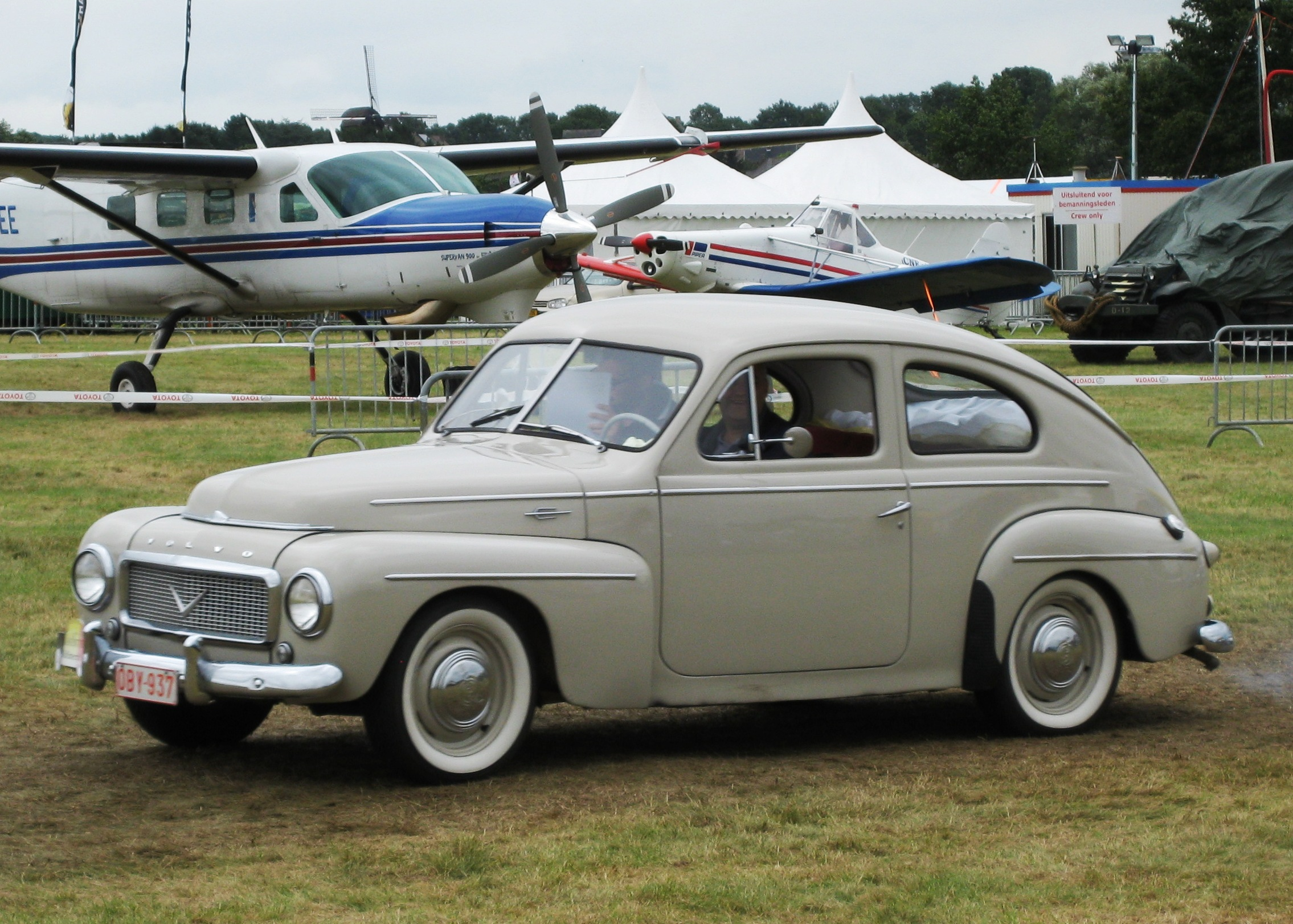
- 1957 Volvo PV444

Overview
- Production: 1944–1958

Body and chassis
- Layout: FR layout

Powertrain
- Engine: 1.4 L B4B I4; 1.4 L B14A I4; 1.6 L B16A I4; 1.6 L B16B I4
- Transmission: 3-speed manual

The PV444 was Volvo's first unibody car. Its body structure was influenced by the 1939 Hanomag 1.3 litre, which was purchased and studied by Volvo engineers. It was also the first Volvo in almost 20 years to come with a four-cylinder engine (earlier models had used side-valve straight sixes). The first PV444s were powered by 40 PS 1.4 L inline-four engines designated B4B, with three main bearings, overhead valves, and a single downdraft carburettor. The power of this engine increased to 44 PS (32 kW) in October 1950, and to 51 PS (38 kW) in October 1955. US models, beginning to appear in early 1956, received an up-rated version called the B14A, which was given twin side-draft 1½ in SU carburetors for a total of 70 hp. Most early US sales were limited to Texas and southern California. American customers also had the option of European delivery, in which case they could also get a cheaper model with the basic B4B engine.

By the 1957 model year, engine displacement was increased to 1.6 L and both single downdraft- B16A and twin side-draught carburetted B16B versions were offered.

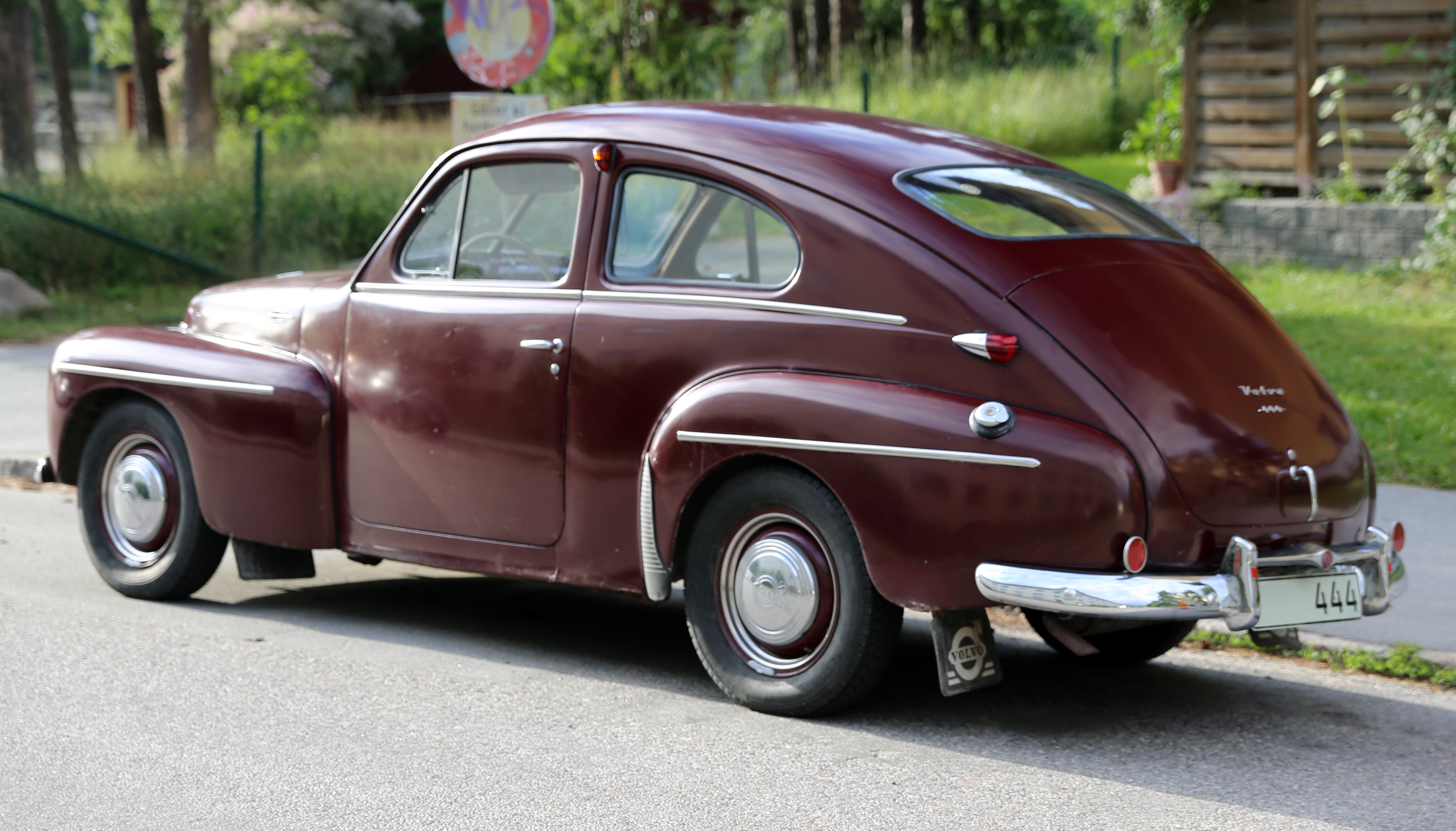
1954 PV 444 HS, showing the new full-sized rear windscreen

== PV544 ==
PV544
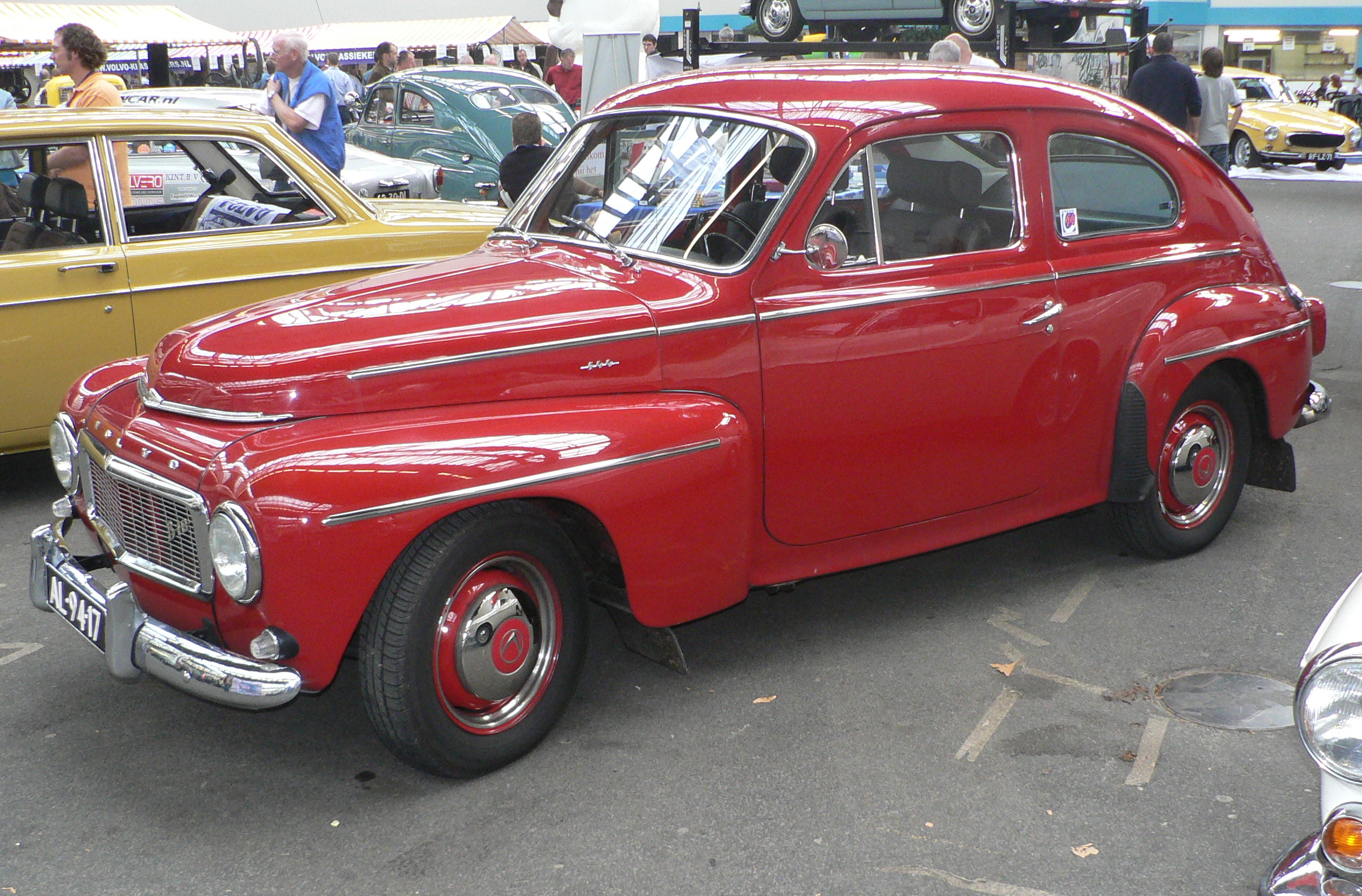

Overview
- Production: 1958–1966

Body and chassis
- Layout: FR layout

Powertrain
- Engine: 1.6 L B16 I4; 1.8 L B18A/B18D I4
- Transmission: 3-speed manual; 4-speed manual

In 1958, the PV544 was phased in. Subtle differences with the PV444 included the introduction of a curved one-piece windshield to replace the two panes of flat glass, larger taillights, and a ribbon-type speedometer. The 444's three-speed manual transmission was also supplanted by a four-speed unit in the 544. The interior was modified to accommodate five people instead of four by increasing the width of the back seat and using thinner backrests on the front seats.

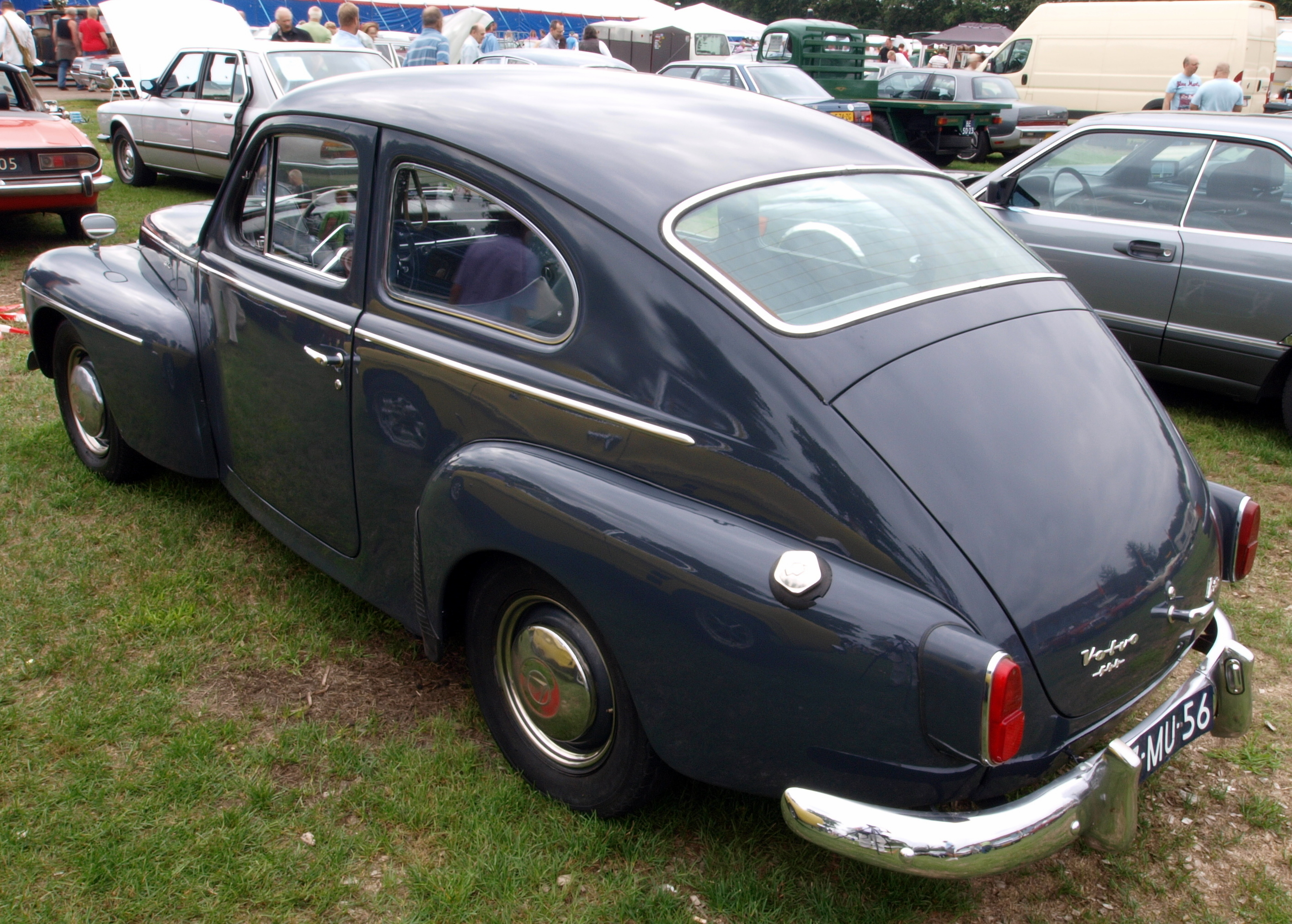
Volvo PV544

The next significant change occurred in 1962, when the B16 was replaced by Volvo's new B18 engine, initially developed for the P1800 sports car introduced the previous year. This 1.8 L engine had five main bearings. Again single and twin carburettor versions were offered, designated B18A and B18D, respectively. The B18A was a slow seller in the US market since the United States' public prioritised performance over fuel economy. Also in 1962, Volvo changed from 6- to 12-volt electrical systems. In 1963 Volvo began producing the 544 at their new Canadian Dartmouth/Halifax plant, the first Volvo plant to be located outside of Sweden.

The PV544 was also made as an estate (wagon), the Duett, initially designated the P445 and later the P210.

The 544 received incremental mechanical revisions and trim changes until its final production year of 1965. Exactly 440,000 units were built during the 18-year run. The car had so endeared itself to its owners that Volvo ran self-deprecating advertisements in late 1965 and early 1966 imploring PV owners not to be angry with the company.

The Duett's utility allowed Volvo to continue the wagon's production through the 1969 model year. These were then replaced in some markets by a high-roof version of the Volvo 145, called the Express.
