= Volvo B18 engine =

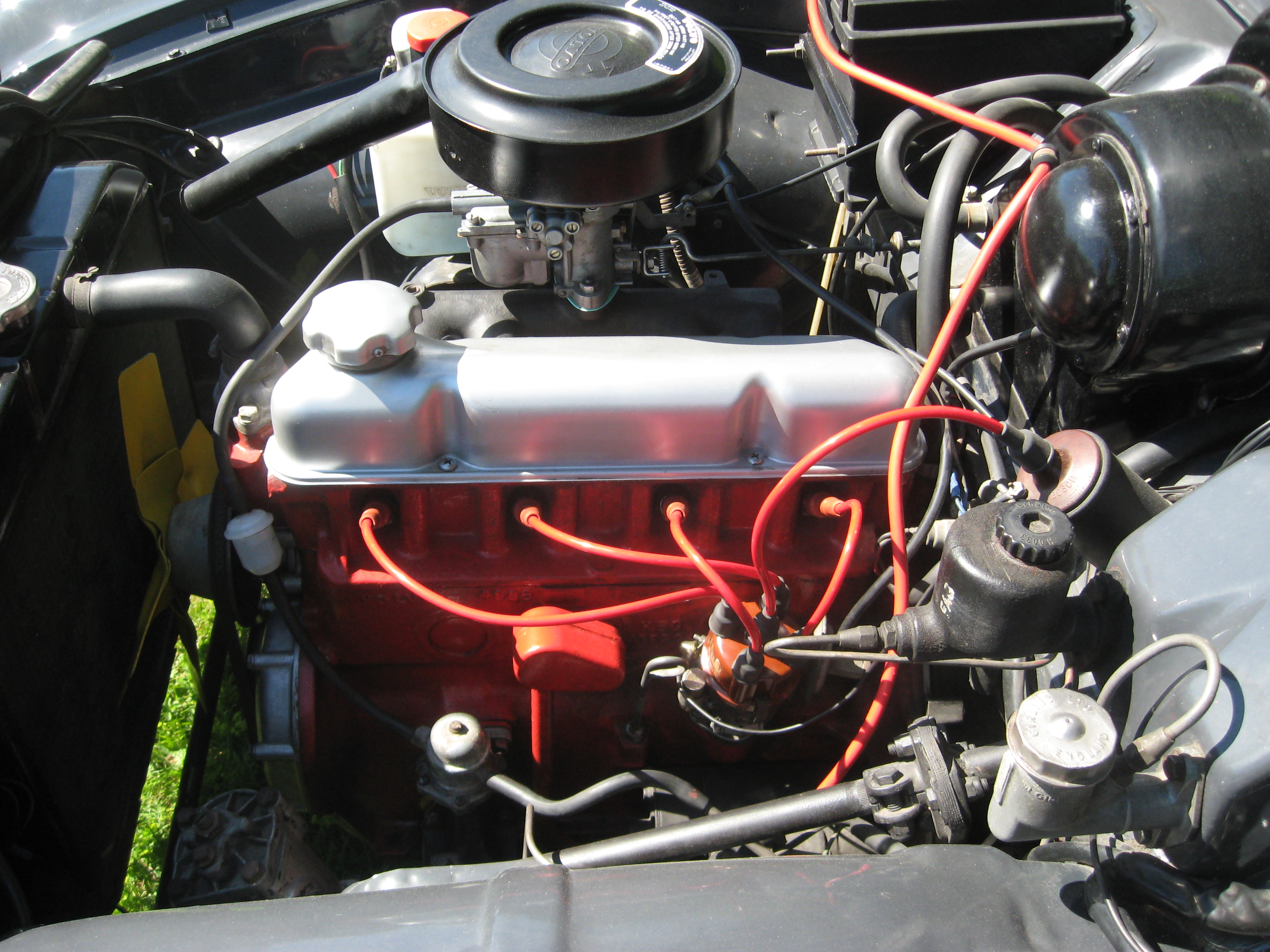

Overview
- Manufacturer: Volvo
- Production: 1961–1968 (B18); 1969–1981 (B20)

Layout
- Configuration: Naturally aspirated Inline-4
- Displacement: 1,778 cc (108.5 cu in) (B18); 1,986 cc (121.2 cu in) (B20)
- Cylinder bore: 84.14 mm (3.31 in) (B18); 88.9 mm (3.5 in) (B20)
- Piston stroke: 80 mm (3.15 in)
- Cylinder block material: Cast iron
- Cylinder head material: Cast iron
- Valvetrain: OHV
- Compression ratio: 8.5:1 – 10.5:1

Combustion
- Fuel system: SU or Zenith/Stromberg carburettors; Electronic fuel injection; Mechanical fuel injection
- Management: Bosch D-Jetronic or K-Jetronic
- Fuel type: Gasoline
- Oil system: Wet sump
- Cooling system: Water cooled

Output
- Power output: 40–225 bhp (29.8–167.8 kW)

Chronology
- Predecessor: Volvo B4B engine
- Successor: Volvo Redblock Engine

The B18 is a 1.8 L inline four cylinder overhead valve automobile engine produced by Volvo from 1961 through 1968. A larger 2.0 L derivative called the B20 debuted in 1969.

Despite being a pushrod design, the engines can rev to 6,500 rpm. They are also reputed to be very durable. The world's highest mileage car, a 1966 Volvo P1800S, traveled more than 4,890,993 km (3,039,122 mi) on its original B18 engine.

== B18 ==
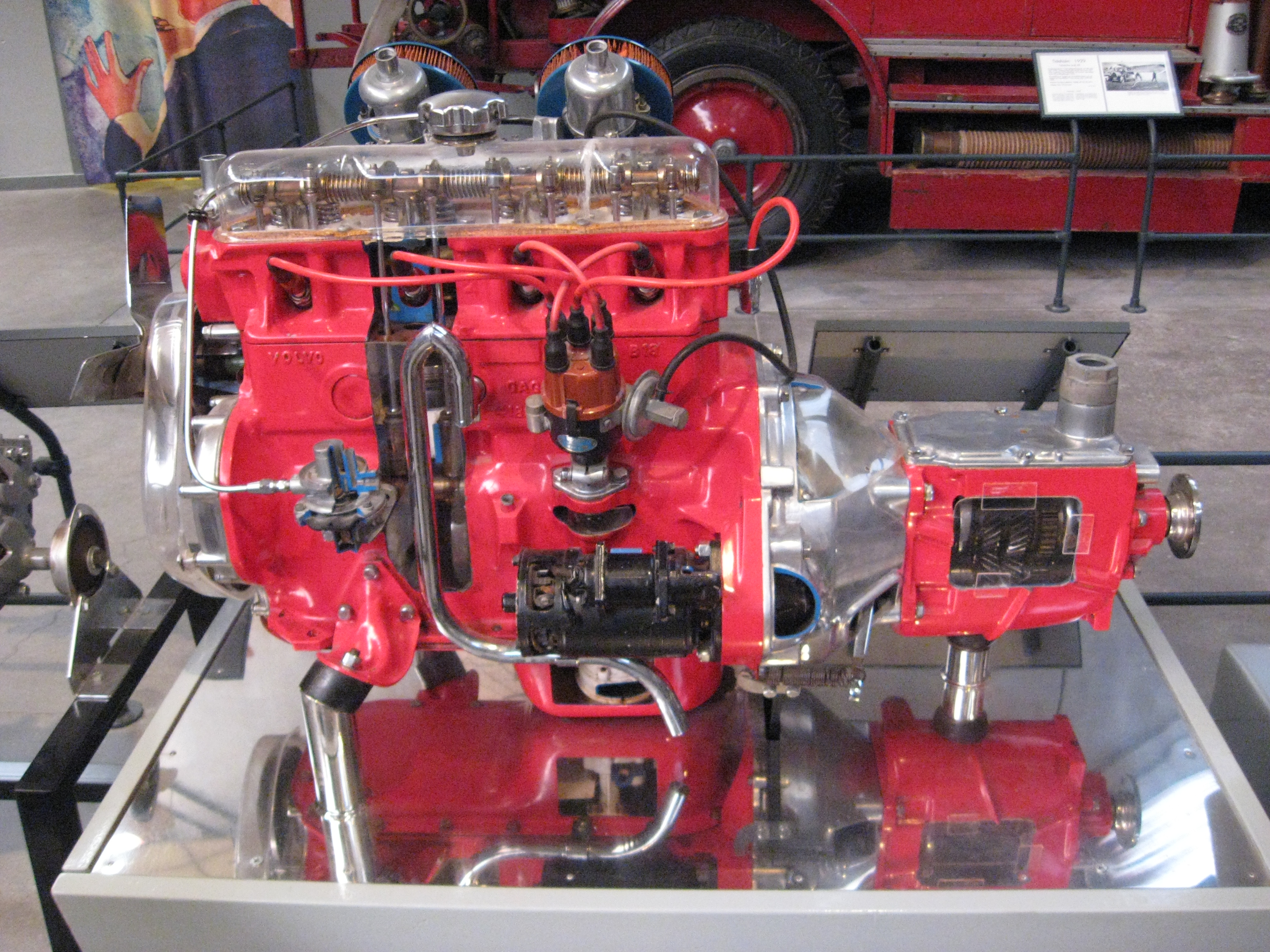
Volvo B18 engine

The B18 is a 1.8 L overhead valve (OHV) engine with two valves per cylinder. It has five main bearings, two more than the B16.

With a bore of 84.14 mm (3.31 in) and stroke of 80 mm (3.15 in), the B18 displaces 1,778 cc (108.5 cu in). The cylinders are on 105 / 108 mm (4.13 / 4.25 in) split bore centers, where the spacing between cylinders 2 and 3 is wider than that between cylinders 1 and 2 or 3 and 4. The engine was used in Volvo's PV544, P210 Duett, 120 (Amazon), P1800 and 140 series. It could also be found in the L3314 and the Bandvagn 202 military vehicles. The B18 was fitted to many Volvo Penta sterndrive marine propulsion systems. It was also used in the Facel Vega Facel III and the Marcos 1800 GT.

There are four variations of this engine:

- B18A: Single carburettor version.
- B18B: Dual carburettor version with a higher compression ratio, fitted variously with dual sidedraft SU or Zenith/Stromberg carburettors.
- B18C: Single carburettor version with a lower compression ratio and mechanical RPM regulator, fitted in the gasoline powered versions of the Volvo BM 320 tractor. This version was also used for the elevator in the PS-15 radar system.
- B18D Dual carburettor version with a lower compression ratio.

=== DOHC ===
In 1971 Swedish engineer Gunnar Axelsson developed a DOHC cylinder head for the B18 engine family. This cylinder head was used in competition Volvos for several years. On 1 January 2014 the Grainger & Worrall company announced that they had partnered with Axelsson to reproduce the DOHC head for the B18 engine. Power output of the base engine was expected to be 190 bhp (141.7 kW), while a high-output version developing 225 bhp (167.8 kW) would also be available.

=== B36 ===
In 1952 Volvo unveiled the Volvo Philip concept car powered by a 3.6 litre V8 engine that would later be called the B36. The V8 engine had exactly the same bore and stroke dimensions as the four-cylinder B18, leading some to suggest that the B18 is one-half of the V8. Significant differences between the two engines included the fact that while the V8 engine has crossflow cylinder heads, the four cylinder has a reverse-flow cylinder head. This suggests that the engines are for the most part separate designs.

== B20 ==
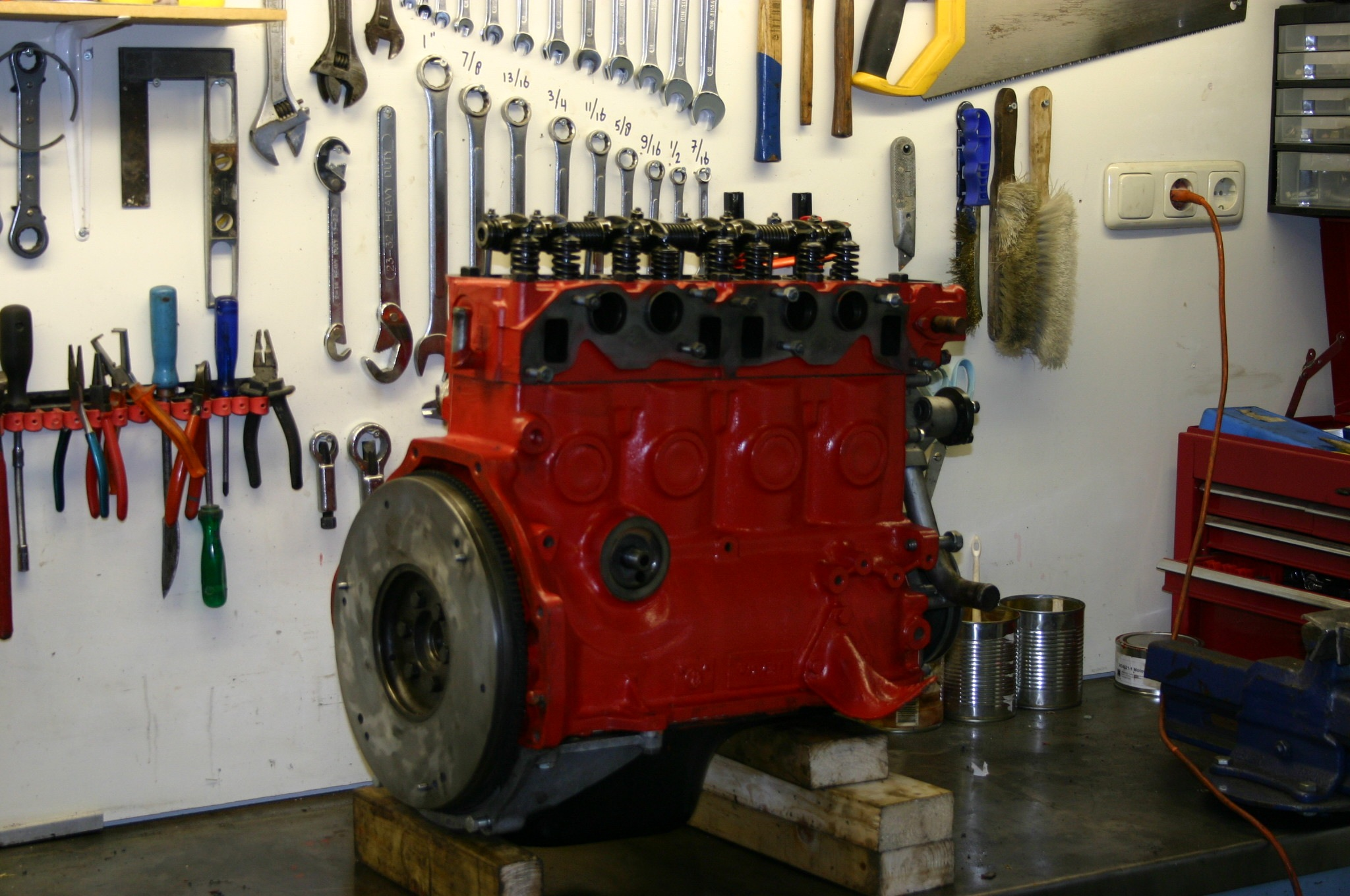
Volvo B18, rear 3/4 view

The 2-litre B20 is a bored-out B18 introduced in 1969, with its bore diameter enlarged to 88.9 mm (3.5 in) and a displacement of 1,986 cc (121.2 cu in). The design is virtually identical to the earlier B18, thus most parts are functionally interchangeable, albeit with running changes to the manufacture and design of components. The B20 engine was used in the Volvo 120, 1800, 140, C202 and 240 series, and also in the Bofors Haubits FH77 howitzer. A modified version was used in the one-off 1969 Volvo GTZ concept car. The B20 was produced until 1981.

There are five variations of this engine:

- B20A: Single carburettor version. First produced in 1969.
- B20B: Dual carburettor version with a higher compression ratio. First produced in 1969.
- B20D: Dual carburettor version with a lower compression ratio. First produced in 1971.
- B20E: Fuel injection version with a high compression ratio. First produced in 1970.
- B20F: Fuel injection version with low compression ratio. First produced in 1972 for lower emissions.

The B20E and B20F versions featured larger valves, and intake/exhaust ports and for 1974–1975 switched from electronic D-Jetronic to mechanical K-Jetronic injection.

In 1974 the number of bolts holding the flywheel increased from 6 to 8 and the size of the connecting rods was increased.

The B20A was revived for use in the C202 from 1977 to 1981.

=== B30 ===
The 3.0 L (183 cu in) six-cylinder B30 is a B20 with two additional cylinders, introduced for the 1969 model for the newly released Volvo 164.

== Engine chart ==
Volvo B18 and B20 engine specifications
Engine	Year	Induction	Power (SAE)	Power (DIN)	Torque (SAE)	Torque (DIN)	Compression
B18A	1962–1964	Zenith 36VN	75 PS (55 kW; 74 hp) at 4500 rpm	68 PS (50 kW) at 4500 rpm	101 lb⋅ft (137 N⋅m) at 2800 rpm	13.5 kp⋅m (132 N⋅m) at 2600 rpm	8.5:1
B18A	1965–1968	ZS 175-CD2-S	85 PS (63 kW; 84 hp) at 5000 rpm	75 PS (55 kW; 74 hp) at 4700 rpm	108 lb⋅ft (146 N⋅m) at 3000 rpm	105 lb⋅ft (142 N⋅m) at 2300 rpm	8.7:1
B18B	1961–1963	2 x SU HS6	100 PS (74 kW; 99 hp) at 5500 rpm		108 lb⋅ft (146 N⋅m) at 4000 rpm		9.5:1
B18B	1964–1966	2 x SU HS6	108 PS (79 kW; 107 hp) at 5800 rpm		110 lb⋅ft (149 N⋅m) at 4000 rpm		10:1
B18B	1967–1968 140	2 x SU HS6	115 PS (85 kW; 113 hp) at 6000 rpm	100 PS (74 kW; 99 hp) at 5600 rpm	112 lb⋅ft (152 N⋅m) at 4000 rpm	107 lb⋅ft (145 N⋅m) at 3500 rpm	10:1
B18B	1967–1968 121 122S	2 x SU HS6	115 PS (85 kW; 113 hp) at 6000 rpm	96 PS (71 kW; 95 hp) at 5600 rpm	112 lb⋅ft (152 N⋅m) at 4000 rpm	106.5 lb⋅ft (144 N⋅m) at 3500 rpm	10:1
B18B	1967–1968 1800S	2 x SU HS6	115 PS (85 kW; 113 hp) at 6000 rpm	103 PS (76 kW; 102 hp) at 5600 rpm	112 lb⋅ft (152 N⋅m) at 4000 rpm	108.5 lb⋅ft (147 N⋅m) at 3500 rpm	10:1
B18C			40 PS (29 kW; 39 hp) at 2500 rpm				
B18D	1961–1963	2 x SU HS6	90 PS (66 kW; 89 hp) at 5000 rpm		105 lb⋅ft (142 N⋅m) at 3500 rpm		8.5:1
B18D	1964–1966	2 x SU HS6	95 PS (70 kW; 94 hp) at 5400 rpm		107 lb⋅ft (145 N⋅m) at 3800 rpm		8.7:1
B18D	1967-1968	2 x SU HS6	100 PS (74 kW; 99 hp) at 5700 rpm	90 PS (66 kW; 89 hp) at 5500 rpm	108 lb⋅ft (146 N⋅m) at 3500 rpm	105 lb⋅ft (142 N⋅m) at 3200 rpm	8.7:1
B20A	1969–1974	ZS 175-CD2-SE	90 PS (66 kW; 89 hp) at 4800 rpm	82 PS (60 kW; 81 hp) at 4700 rpm	119 lb⋅ft (161 N⋅m) at 3000 rpm	116 lb⋅ft (157 N⋅m) at 2300 rpm	8.7:1
B20B	1969–1970	2 x 175-CD2-SE	118 PS (87 kW; 116 hp) at 5800 rpm	100 PS (74 kW; 99 hp) at 5500 rpm	123 lb⋅ft (167 N⋅m) at 3500 rpm	112 lb⋅ft (152 N⋅m) at 3500 rpm	9.5:1
B20B	1971-1974	2 x SU HIF6; 2 x 175-CD2-SE	118 PS (87 kW; 116 hp) at 5800 rpm	100 PS (74 kW; 99 hp) at 5500 rpm	123 lb⋅ft (167 N⋅m) at 3500 rpm	112 lb⋅ft (152 N⋅m) at 3500 rpm	9.3:1
B20B	1972–1974 US	2 x SU HIF6	97 PS (71 kW; 96 hp) at 5800 rpm		103 lb⋅ft (140 N⋅m) at 3500 rpm		8.7:1
B20D	1969–1971	2 x SU HIF6	105 PS (77 kW; 104 hp) at 5500 rpm	90 PS (66 kW; 89 hp) at 5300 rpm	123 lb⋅ft (167 N⋅m) at 3000 rpm	114 lb⋅ft (155 N⋅m) at 2800 rpm	9.3:1
B20D	1972	2 x SU HIF6	110 PS (81 kW; 108 hp) at 5500 rpm	95 PS (70 kW; 94 hp) at 5300 rpm	123 lb⋅ft (167 N⋅m) at 3000 rpm	114 lb⋅ft (155 N⋅m) at 2800 rpm	9.3:1
B20E	1970–1971	Bosch D-Jetronic	130 PS (96 kW; 128 hp) at 6000 rpm	120 PS (88 kW; 118 hp) at 6000 rpm	130 lb⋅ft (176 N⋅m) at 3500 rpm	123 lb⋅ft (167 N⋅m) at 3500 rpm	10.5:1
B20E	1972–1973	Bosch D-Jetronic	135 PS (99 kW; 133 hp) at 6000 rpm	124 PS (91 kW; 122 hp) at 6000 rpm	130 lb⋅ft (176 N⋅m) at 3500 rpm	123 lb⋅ft (167 N⋅m) at 3500 rpm	10.5:1
B20E	1974	Bosch K-Jetronic	135 PS (99 kW; 133 hp) at 6000 rpm	124 PS (91 kW; 122 hp) at 6000 rpm	130 lb⋅ft (176 N⋅m) at 3500 rpm	123 lb⋅ft (167 N⋅m) at 3500 rpm	10.2:1
B20F	1972	Bosch D-Jetronic	107 PS (79 kW; 106 hp) at 6000 rpm		113 lb⋅ft (153 N⋅m) at 3500 rpm		8.7:1
B20F	1973	Bosch D-Jetronic	112 PS (82 kW; 110 hp) at 6000 rpm		115 lb⋅ft (156 N⋅m) at 3500 rpm		8.7:1
B20F	1974	Bosch K-Jetronic	109 PS (80 kW; 108 hp) at 5500 rpm		115 lb⋅ft (156 N⋅m) at 2500 rpm		8.7:1
B20F	1975^{1}	Bosch K-Jetronic	98 PS (72 kW; 97 hp) at 6000 rpm		110 lb⋅ft (149 N⋅m) at 3500 rpm		8.7:1
Note:^{1}94 PS (69 kW; 93 hp) and 105 lb⋅ft (142 N⋅m) when equipped with a catalytic converter.

== See also ==
- List of Volvo engines
- Volvo B30 engine
- Volvo PV544
- Volvo P210 Duett
- Volvo 120 (Amazon)
- Volvo P1800
- Volvo 140
- Volvo 240
- Volvo C202
