= Volvo Amazon =

Swedish mid-size car

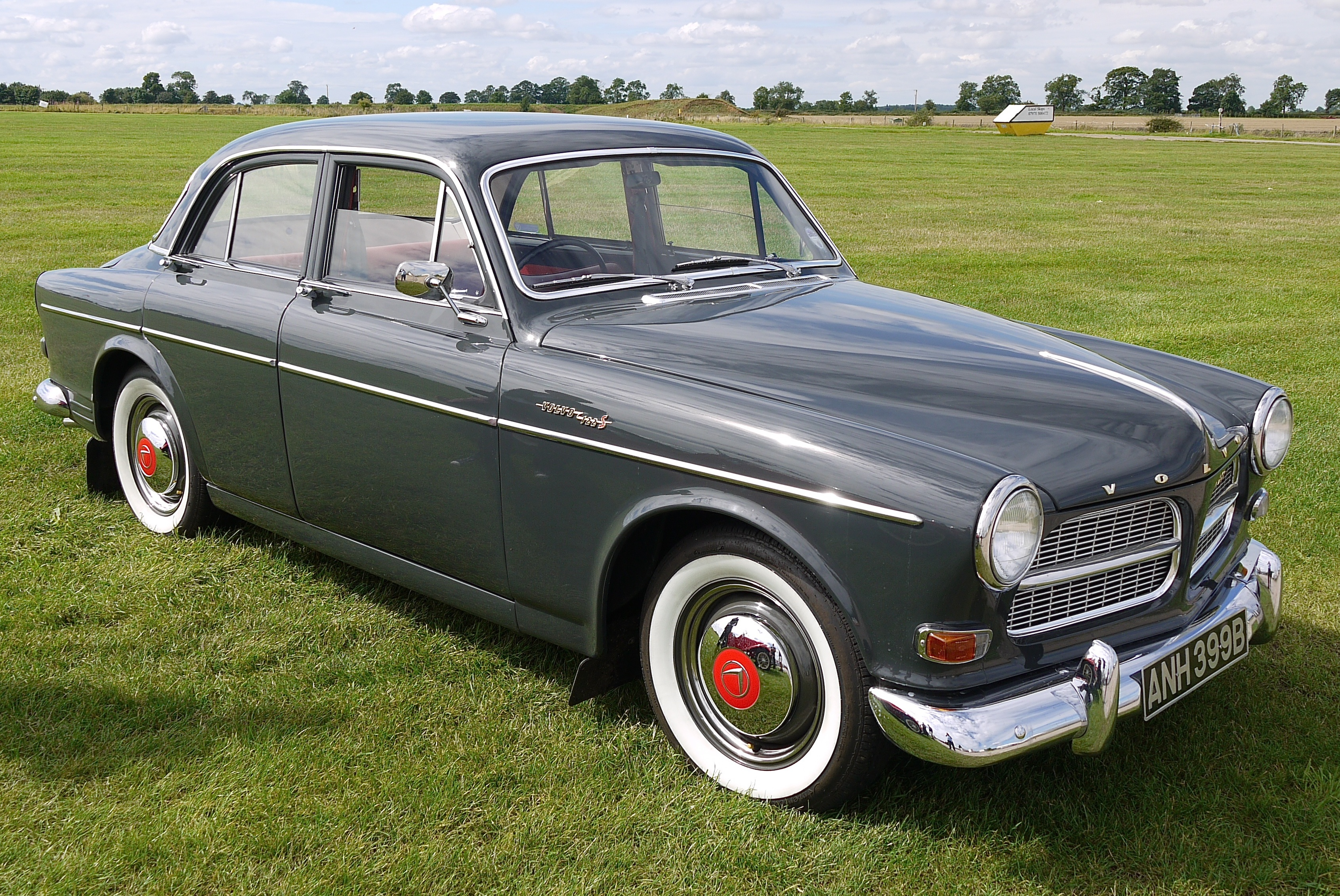
- Volvo 122 four-door

Overview
- Manufacturer: Volvo Cars
- Also called: Volvo 121/122/123GT; Volvo 131//132/133; Volvo 221/222/223; Volvo Canadian
- Production: July 1956 – December 1970; 667,791 produced
- Assembly: Sweden: Lundby, Gothenburg; Sweden: Torslanda (Torslandaverken); Belgium: Ghent (VCG); Canada: Halifax (VHA); Chile: Arica (Divolvo); South Africa: Durban
- Designer: Jan Wilsgaard

Body and chassis
- Class: Large family car (D)
- Body style: 2-door saloon (130-series); 4-door saloon (120-series); 5-door estate (220-series)
- Layout: FR layout
- Related: Volvo P1800

Powertrain
- Engine: 1583 cc B16 I4; 1778 cc B18 I4; 1986 cc B20 I4
- Transmission: 3-speed H6 manual; 3-speed Volvo M30 manual; 3-speed Volvo M31 overdrive manual; 4-speed M4 manual; 4-speed Volvo M40 manual; 4-speed Volvo M41 overdrive manual; 3-speed Borg-Warner 35 automatic

Dimensions
- Wheelbase: 2,590 mm (102.0 in)
- Length: saloon: 4,395–4,450 mm (173.0–175.2 in); estate: 4,490 mm (176.8 in)
- Width: 1,620 mm (63.8 in)
- Height: 1,505 mm (59.3 in)
- Curb weight: 2,400 lb (1,100 kg)

Chronology
- Predecessor: Volvo PV444/544
- Successor: Volvo 140 Series

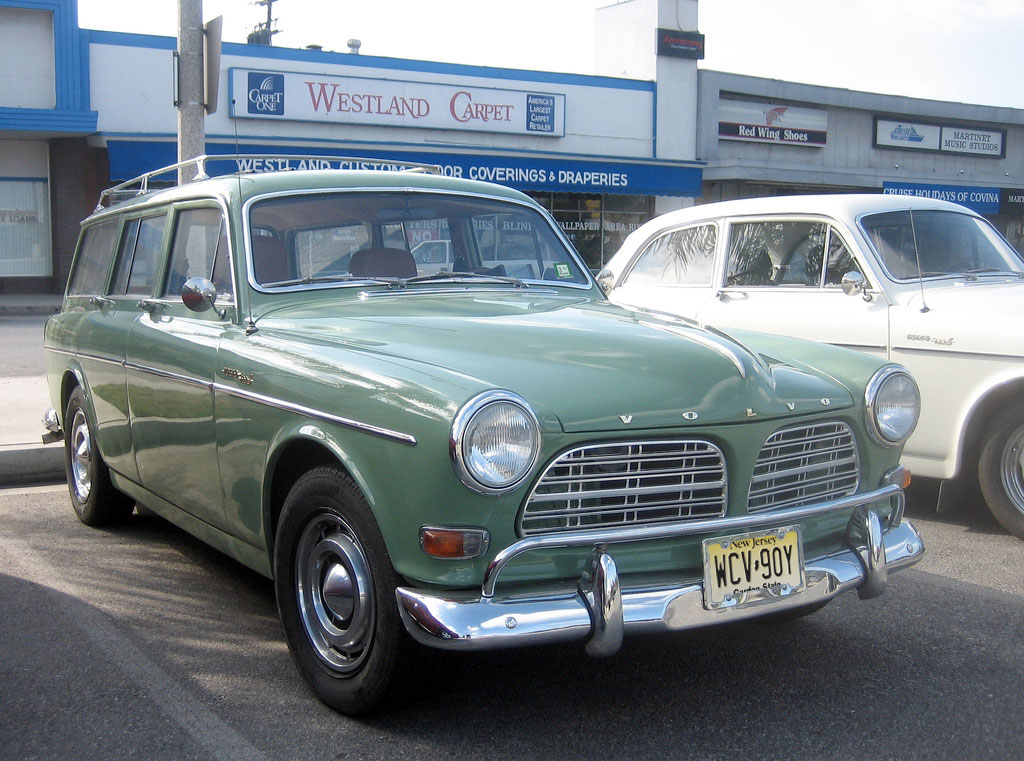
1966 Volvo Amazon estate

The Volvo Amazon is a mid-sized car that was manufactured and marketed by Volvo Cars from 1956 to 1970. It was introduced in the United States as the 122S at the 1959 New York International Auto Show.

The Amazon shares the wheelbase, tall posture and high H-point seating of its predecessor, the PV444/544, and was offered in two-door sedan, four-door sedan, and five-door wagon body styles — all noted for their ponton styling. In 1959 Volvo became the world's first manufacturer to provide front seat belts as standard equipment — by providing them on all Amazon models, including the export models — and later becoming the first car featuring three-point seat belts as standard equipment.

When introduced, the car was named the Amason (with an 's'), deriving from the fierce female warriors of Greek mythology, the Amazons. German motorcycle manufacturer Kreidler had already registered the name Amazone, and the two companies agreed that Volvo could only use the name domestically (i.e., within Sweden), modifying the spelling to Amazon. Subsequently, Volvo began its tri-digit nomenclature and the line became known as the 120 Series.

The Amazon was originally manufactured at Volvo's Lundby plant in Gothenburg and subsequently at the company's Torslandaverken plant, which began operating in 1964. By the end of production, 234,653 four-door models, 359,917 two-door models and 73,220 station wagons had been produced, of which 60% were exported; for a total of 667,791 vehicles.

== Styling and design ==
The Amazon saloon's ponton genre, three-box styling was inspired by US cars of the early 1950s, strongly resembling the Chrysler New Yorker sedan and the Chrysler 300C hardtop Coupe. According to designer Jan Wilsgaard, the Amazon's styling was inspired by a Kaiser he saw at the Gothenburg harbour.

The Amazon features strong articulation front to rear, pronounced "shoulders", and slight but visible tailfins. These features became inspiration for Peter Horbury when reconceiving Volvo's design direction with the V70 after decades of rectilinear, slab-sided, boxy designs.

The Amazon's bodywork was constructed of phosphate-treated steel (to improve paint adhesion) and with heavy use of undercoating and anti-corrosive oil treatment.

=== Estate ===
The estate (or station wagon) version was introduced at the 1962 Stockholm Auto Show, and Volvo manufactured 73,000 examples between 1962 and 1969. The Amazon estate features a two-piece tailgate, with the lower section folding down to provide a load surface and the upper section that hinged overhead. The vehicle's rear license plate, attached to the lower tailgate, could fold "up" such that when the tailgate was lowered and the vehicle in use, the license plate was still visible. This idea was used by the original 1959 Mini. In recent years a similar arrangement was used on the tailgate of the Subaru Baja.

The Amazon platform was used as the basis for the P1800 and 1800ES.

== History ==
Under prototype designation 1200, following the PV444's internal designation as the 1100, the Amazon was released in the press in February 1956, with production initially set to begin in July of the same year, and deliveries commenced in August 1956 — under the now modified internal designation 120 series. Further iterations included the 121, the base model with a single carburetor 66 bhp (49 kW) engine, the 122S introduced in 1958 as a performance model equipped with a dual carburetor 85 bhp (63 kW) engine. The Amazon's handbrake location, outboard of the driver's seat, was intended to accommodate subsequent bench seat models with column shift transmissions- these were produced in small numbers and made available to certain export markets. Buyers began to receive the first cars in February 1957, and initial models were two-tone red and black with light gray roof, light grey with a black roof, followed by a dark blue with gray roof in 1958.

The Volvo Amazon in station wagon form would become the first foreign market police car introduced to any police force of the United Kingdom in 1965. Having trialled it against a Citroën DS19 Safari and Humber Super Snipe station wagon, Hampshire Constabulary purchased a white Volvo Amazon 1800 station wagon with a Ruddspeed upgraded engine initially for use as an accident tender, carrying equipment used by the police when attending scenes of road accidents, before transferring onto traffic policing duties alongside the Humber Super Snipe. In total, five white Volvo Amazon station wagons were acquired by Hampshire Constabulary's traffic division, however the purchase of foreign police cars was the subject of local controversy, with letters of complaint written to Hampshire's Chief Constable and in Autocar magazine; Hampshire Constabulary would later find themselves the subject of national controversy and faced heavy criticism by the Home Office for purchasing multiple Volvo 144 saloons for traffic police use.

In 1966 the Volvo PV ended production, replaced by the Amazon Favorit, a less expensive version of the Amazon, without exterior chrome trim, a passenger-side sunshield or cigarette lighter, and with a three-speed rather than four-speed transmission — available in black with red interior and later white or black with red interior. The newer Volvo 140 was becoming the company's mainstream model, and the last of the four-door 120 saloons were produced in 1967. In 1967 came the 123GT, which was a Model 130 with high-compression four-cylinder B18B engine (from the Volvo P1800), M41 gearbox, fully reclining seats, front fog and driving lights (on some markets), alternator, fender mounted mirrors, special steering wheel, dash with a shelf and tachometer, and other cosmetic upgrades. In 1967 the 4-door saloon was discontinued due to the introduction of 140-series. In 1969 the displacement of the old B18 engine was increased and the engine was called the B20. Of note: Volvo Cars arriving in Canada at the port of Halifax, Nova Scotia would have the (not-yet-legal) radial tires removed and replaced with bias-ply tires of-the-day before being accepted by DOT for delivery. Also, the European 'Flash-to-Pass' feature of the turn signal toggle would be disconnected for the British market as it did not have Department of Transport approval. Somehow, whereas most North American vehicles would only have lap safety belts until 1968, both driver and passenger got the 'three-point' shoulder belts, a Volvo safety feature. Fortunately, these remained in place for the new owners and doubtless saving many from death and injury from accidents. 1970 was the last year for the Amazon, and only the 2-door version was left, since the estate wagon was cancelled.

The last Amazon was manufactured on 3 July 1970, however, the last Amazon #359918 assembled was on 18 December 1970, in Durban, South Africa.

== Features ==
Original specifications for the Amazon included the new Volvo B16 engine, a 3-speed manual gearbox (H6) and rear-wheel drive. In 1958 the sport model, Amazon Sport, was released and later the same year the Amazon became the first series produced car with a three-point safety belt in the front seats as standard. In 1962, Volvo introduced a two-door version, a five-door wagon, and the new B18 engine, deleting two-tone paint and upholstery. In 1965 the Amazon color-coordinated embossed vinyl upholstery and door panels became available. The new gearbox selections were the three-speed M30 (briefly offered with an automatic electric clutch), the four-speed M40 and the M41 with four-speed and overdrive. The M31 gearbox was also introduced in 1961 but was only available that year (a three-speed fully synchronized gearbox with overdrive on both second and third direct gears). Gearbox options on the 121 were the M30, M31 and M40 while gearbox options on the 122S were the M40 and M41 gearboxes. In 1964 the Borg-Warner BW35 three-speed automatic transmission also became available on the four-door and two-door. From 1967 to 1968 the BW35 was also available on the five-door wagon.

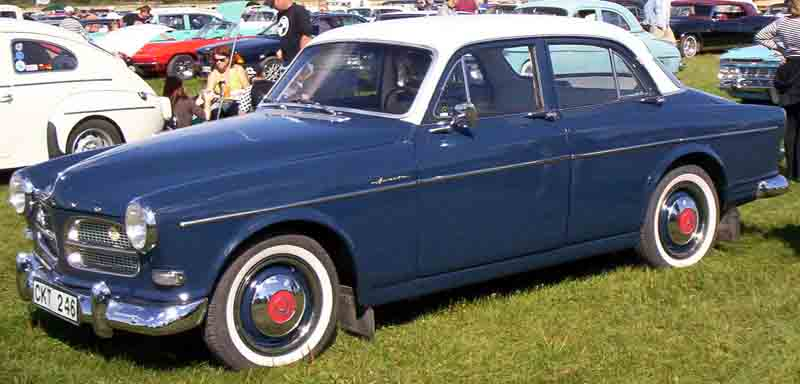
1959 Volvo P12104 4-door saloon

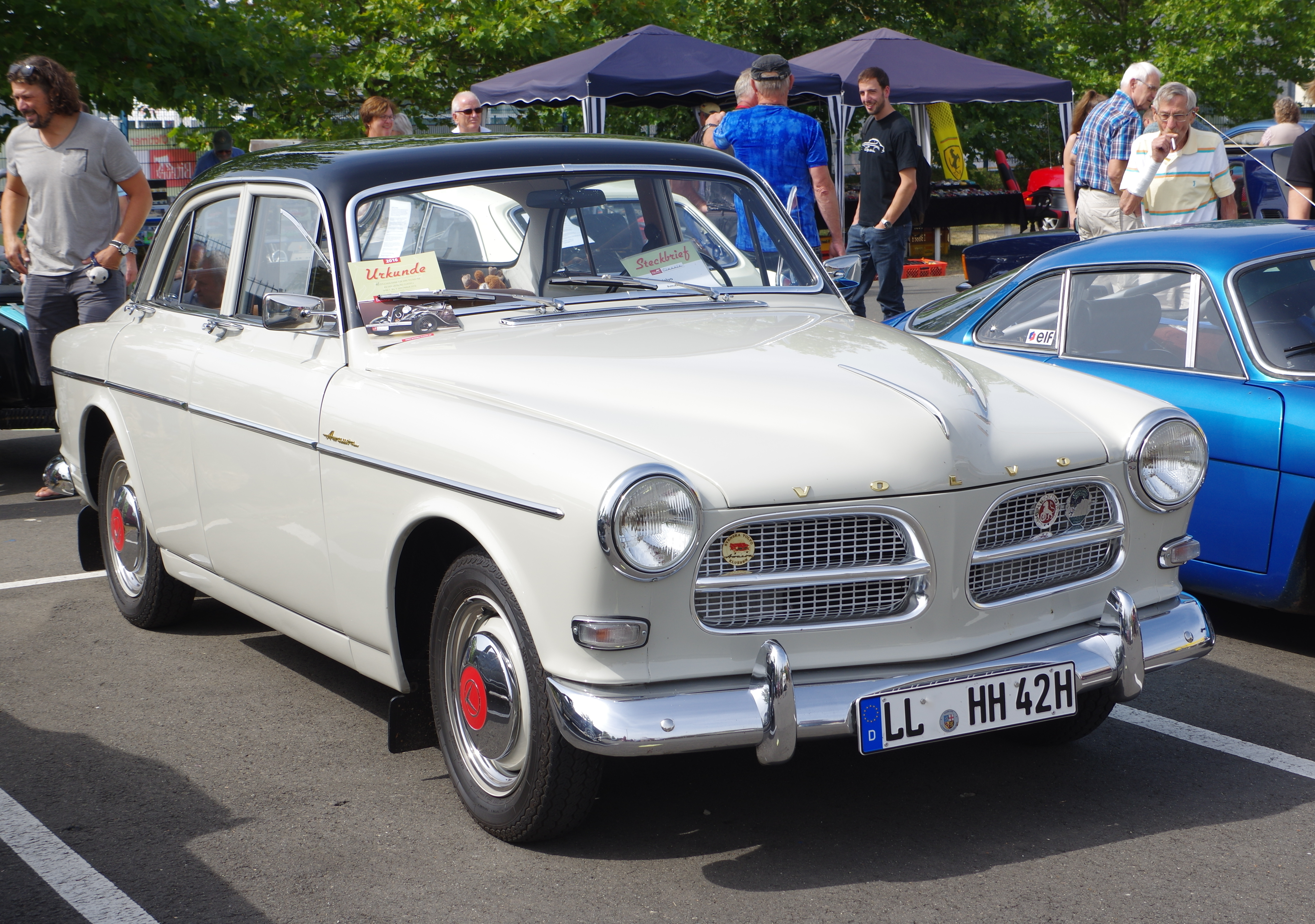
1960 Volvo P12106 Amazon 4-door saloon

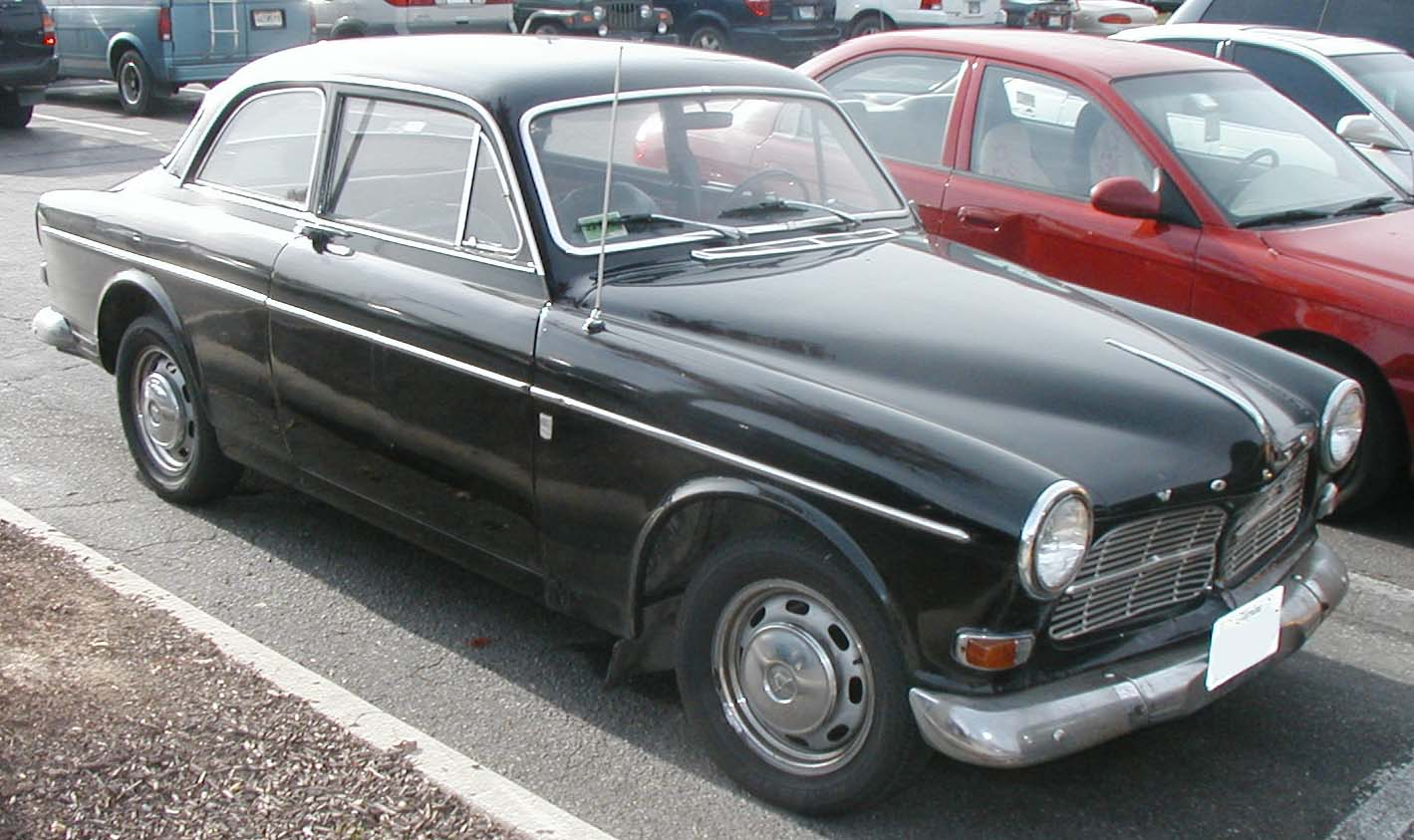
1966 Volvo 122 2-door saloon

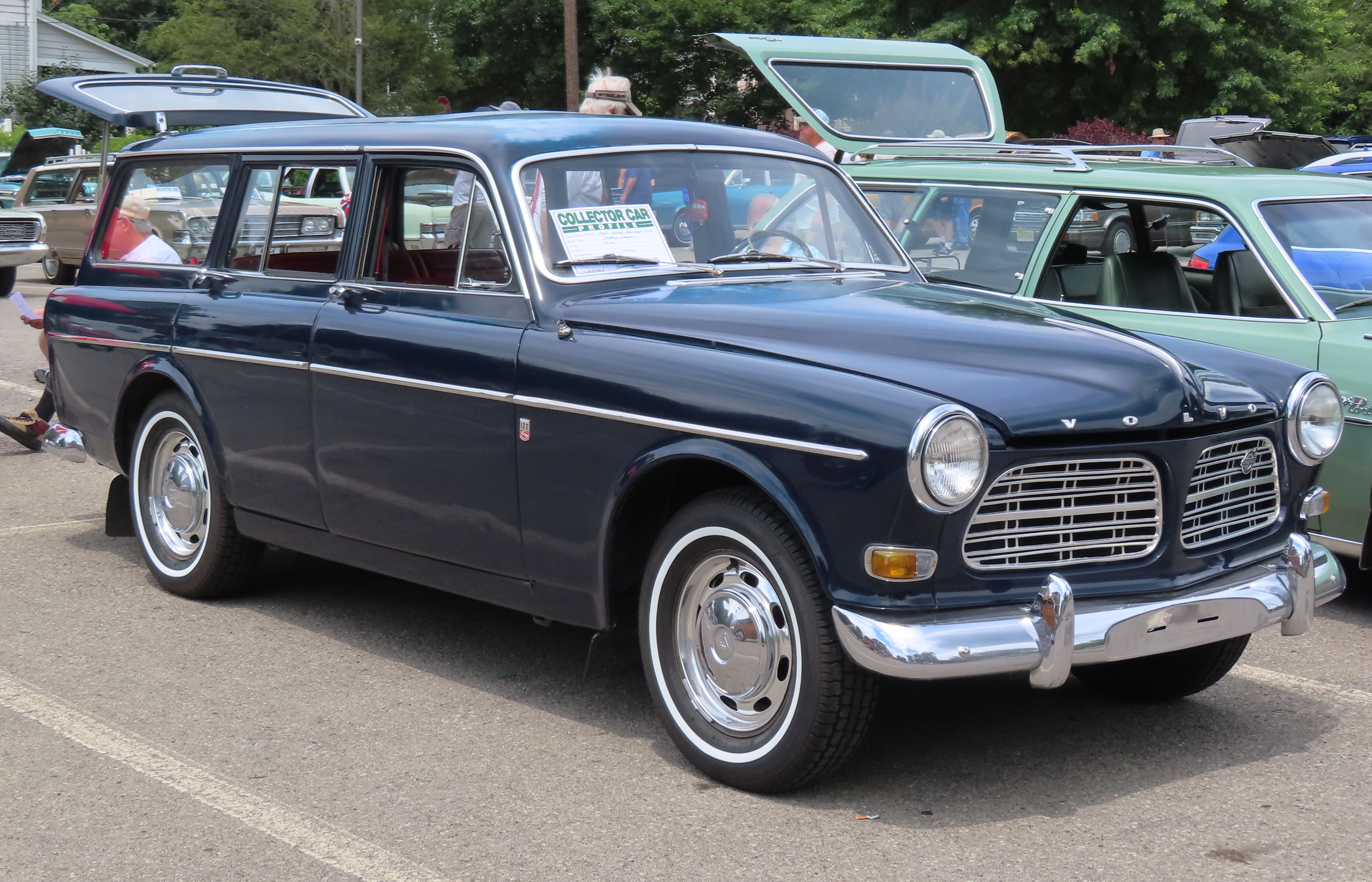
1967 Volvo 122S estate

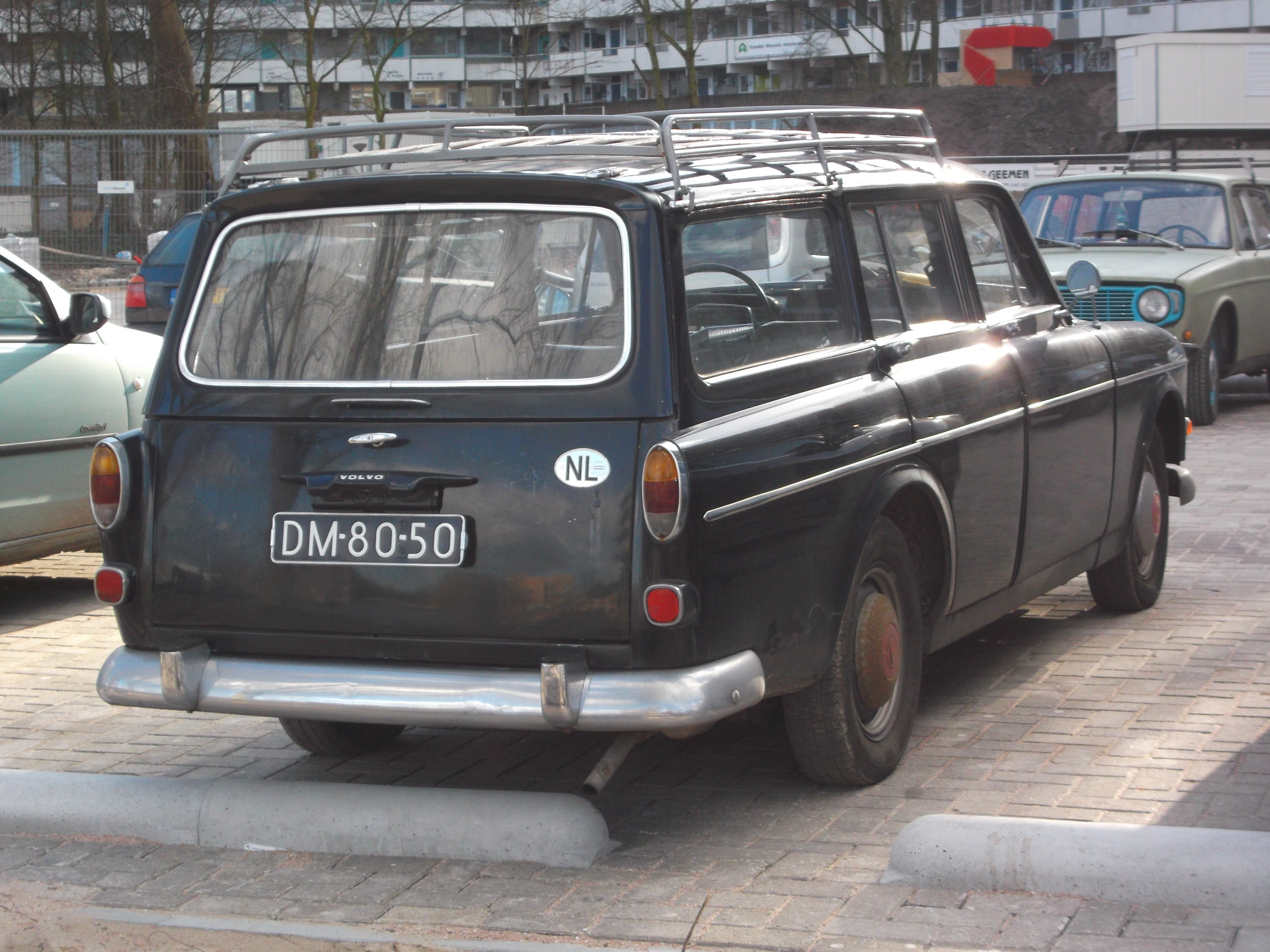
Volvo Amazon P22134 (P220), Amsterdam

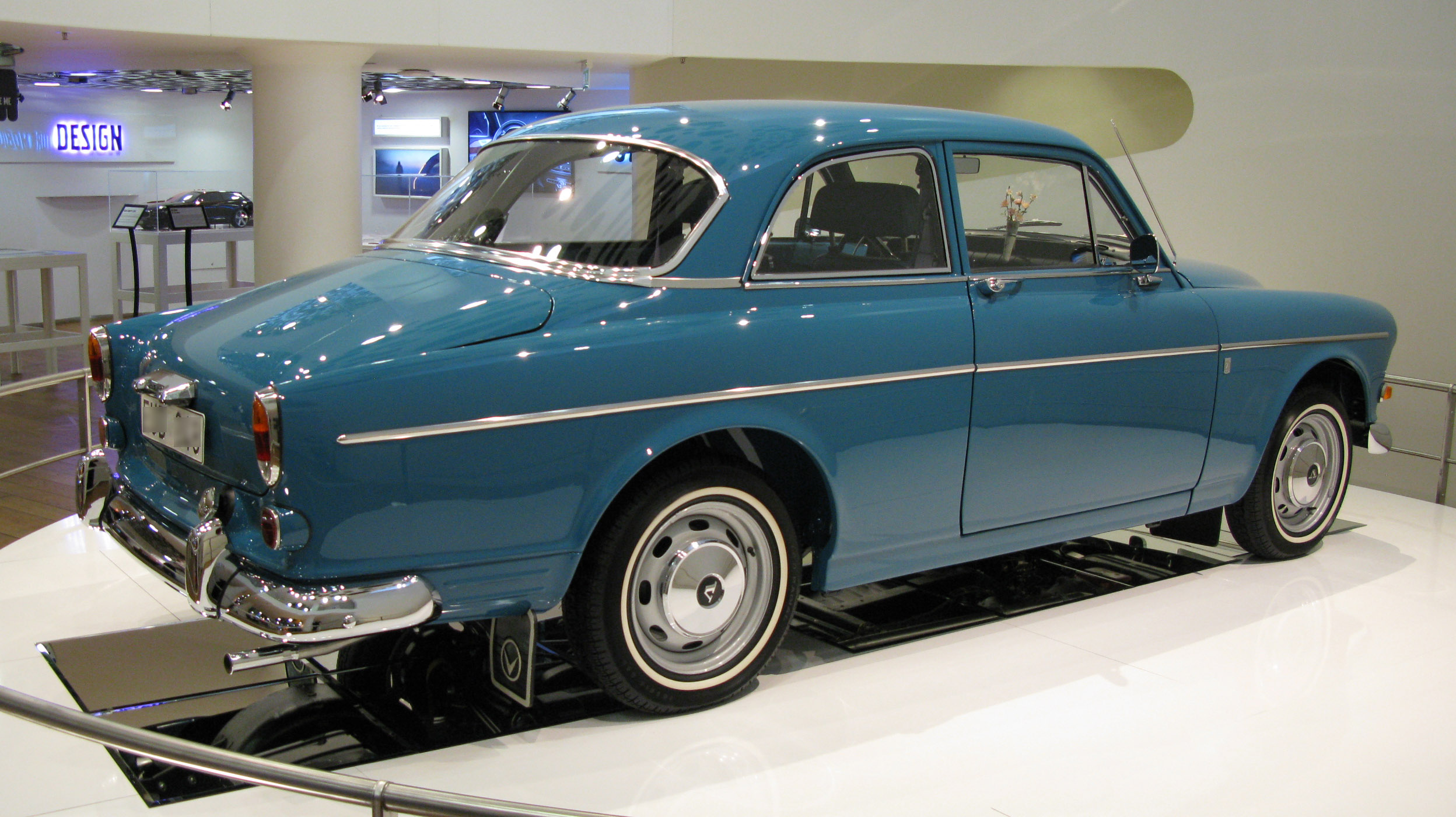
1969 Volvo 121 Amazon 2-door saloon

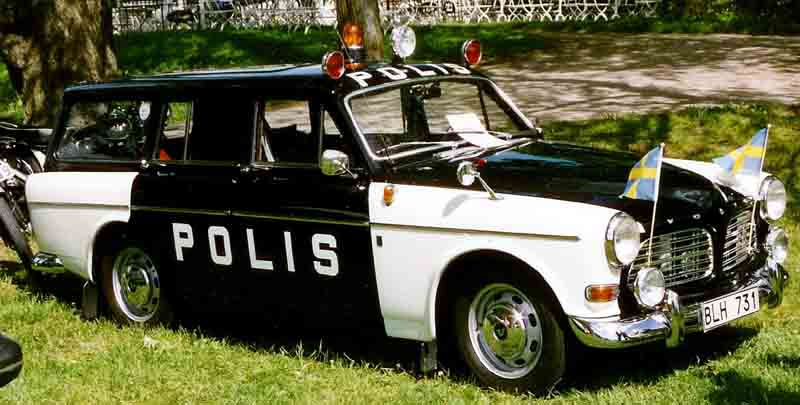
1969 Volvo 221341 S Amazon Police estate

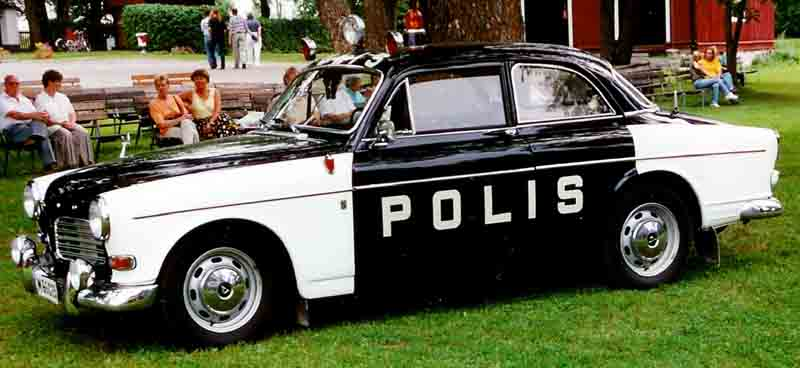
1970 Volvo Amazon Police saloon

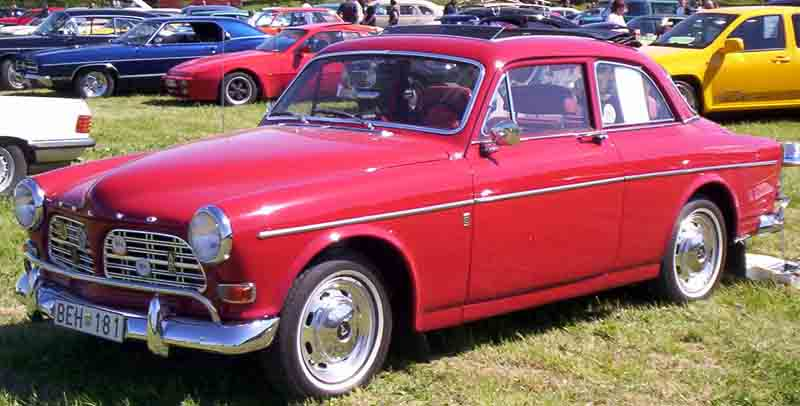
1970 Volvo 131341 T Amazon 2-door saloon

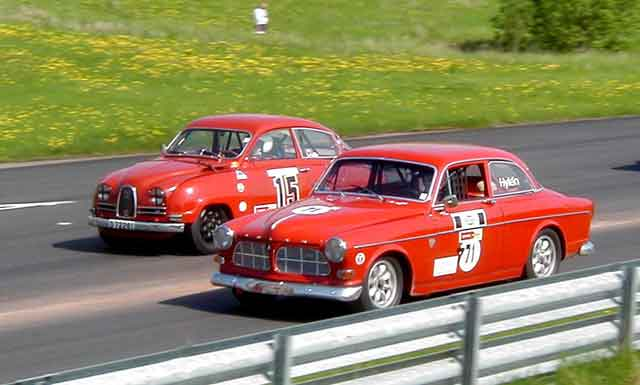
A Saab 93 (left) and a Volvo Amazon (right) line up to race.

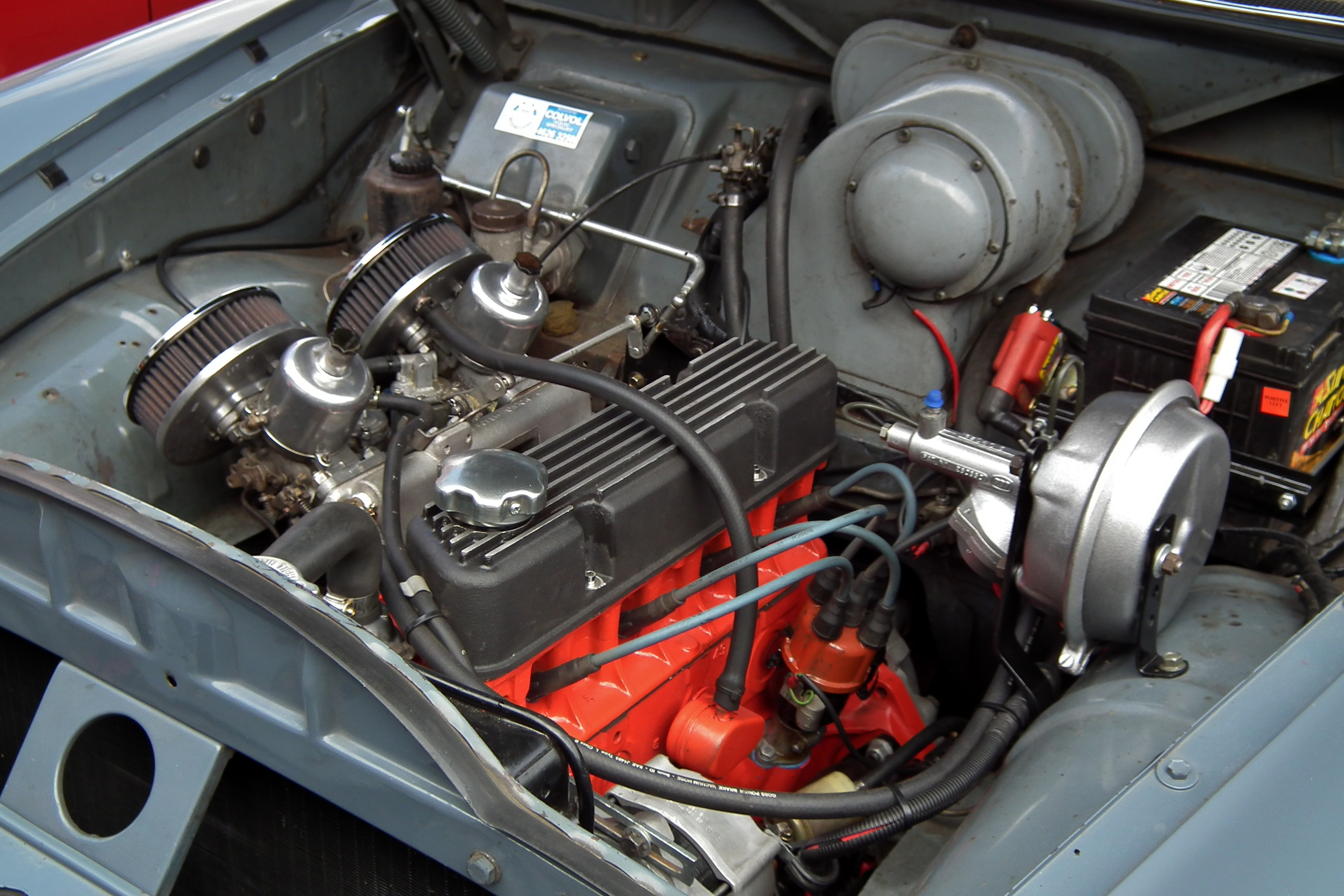
Volvo 122 S saloon engine
