= DiVolvo =

Automobile manufacturer

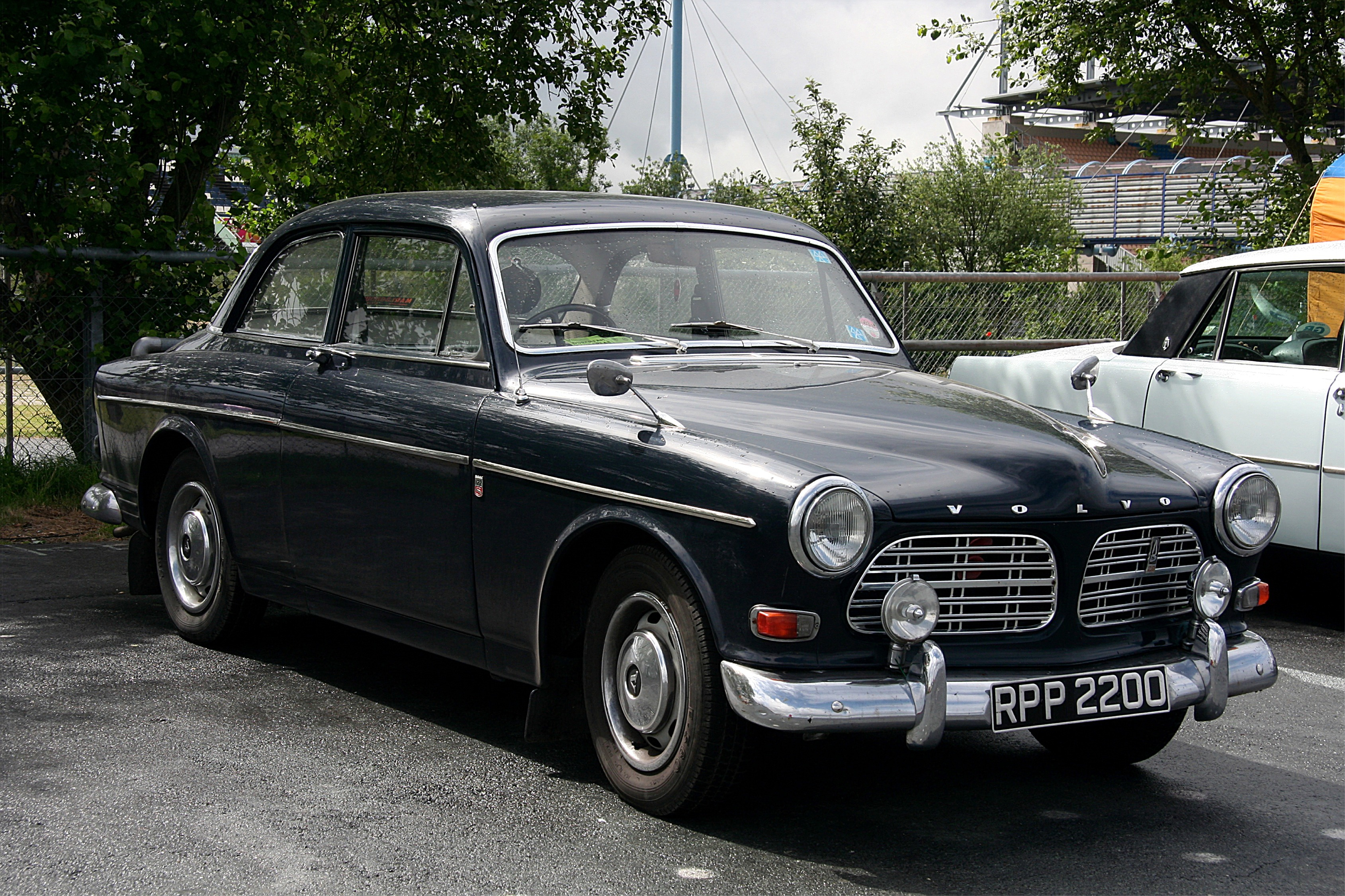
The Volvo 122S is the most important passenger car model from the DiVolvo production.

DiVolvo S.A. - short for Distribuidora Volvo S.A. - was a car manufacturer and dealer from Arica in Chile.

The enterprise was founded in 1959 by Eduardo Averill. With some support from Volvo it began to build an assembly site in Arica. There might also have been some support by Det Norske Veritas. After completion of the site in 1962 there have been built 2956 Volvo 122 S until 1967. The production was based on CKD kits. All of them were four-door sedans. Common or typical features were a front bench seat and steering column gear lever. Some of these cars were also used by the Chilean Police. Some PV544 and P1800 were also assembled at DiVolvo.

DiVolvo also was a dealer, offered maintenance services and served as training facility for Volvo in Southern America.
