= Volvo B4B engine =

Volvo B4B, B14, B16
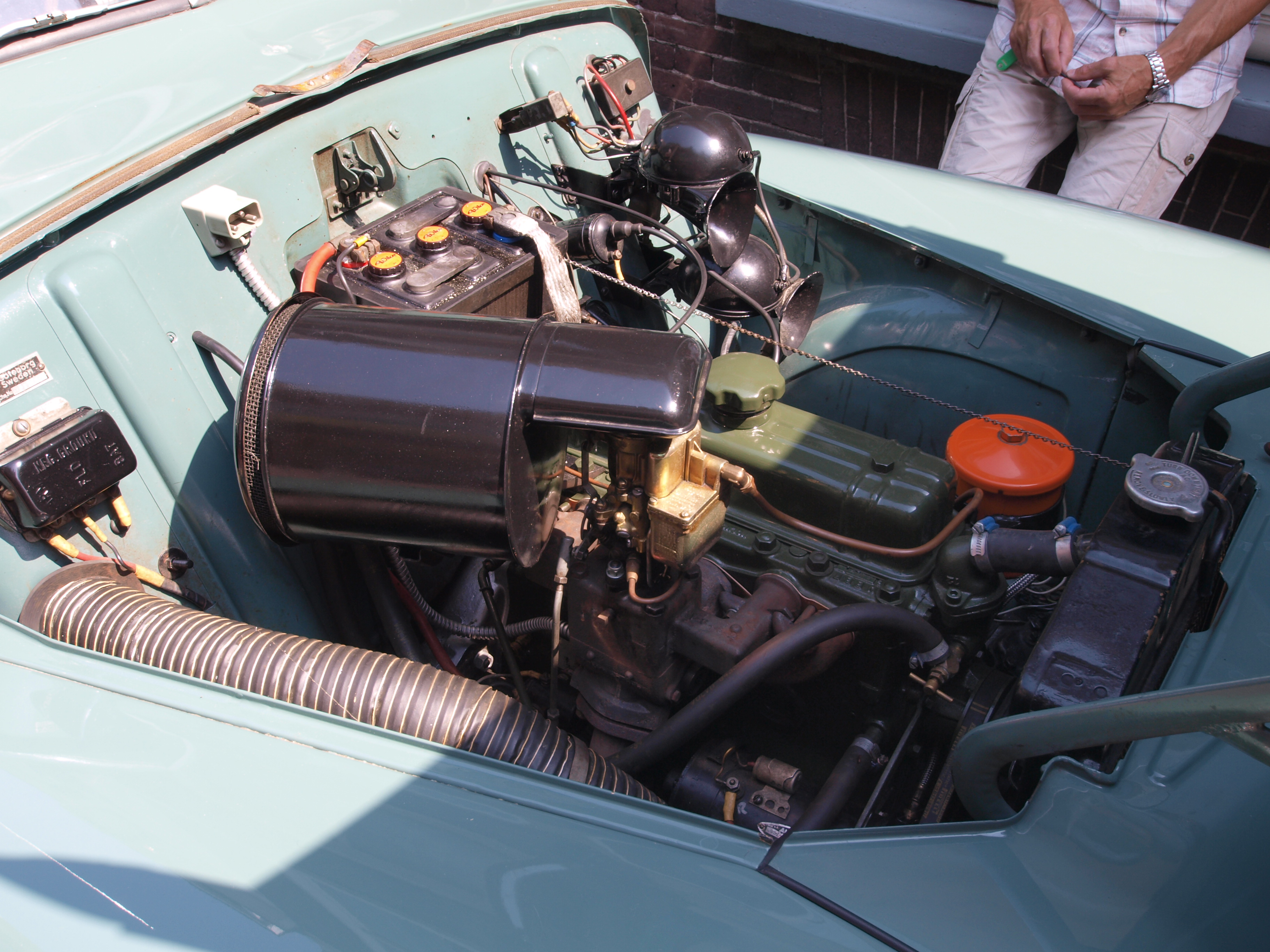

Overview
- Manufacturer: Volvo Personvagnar
- Production: 1944–1962

Layout
- Configuration: Inline-4
- Displacement: 1,414 cc (1.4 L; 86.3 cu in); 1,583 cc (1.6 L; 96.6 cu in)
- Cylinder bore: 75 mm (2.95 in) (1.4 L); 79.4 mm (3.13 in) (1.6 L)
- Piston stroke: 80 mm (3.15 in)
- Cylinder block material: Cast-iron
- Cylinder head material: Cast-iron
- Valvetrain: OHV

Combustion
- Fuel system: Zenith, Carter or SU Carburettors
- Management: Autolite or Bosch
- Fuel type: Gasoline
- Oil system: Wet sump
- Cooling system: Water-cooled

Chronology
- Successor: Volvo B18

Volvo's first overhead valve passenger car engine was the inline-four B4B of 1944 and its descendants, the B14A and B16. These were cast iron engines, and used just three main bearings.

== B4B ==
Introduced in 1944, the B4B displaced 1,414 cc (1.4 L; 86.3 cu in) and powered the Volvo PV444. Series production started in 1947. The B4B was a departure for Volvo who had not produced an automobile with a four-cylinder engine in nearly 20 years. The B4B was equipped with a single down-draught carburetor. Suppliers of ancillaries included Autolite (ignition distributors and generators), Zenith and Carter Carburetors, and Bosch (ignition distributors, generators and starter motors.)

At the time of introduction, the B4B produced 40 PS SAE (29 kW). In 1950, the camshaft profiles and valve mechanisms were modified, increasing output to 44 PS SAE (32 kW). The third and final version appeared in November 1955 and had redesigned head, camshaft, valve springs, and pushrods. Power increased to 51 PS SAE (38 kW); this version remained in production until autumn 1956 when it was replaced by the new, larger B16 variant.

== B14A ==
The B14A was essentially a twin carb version of the B4B. These two engines were nearly identical, except for the induction systems. The B14A carb system was supplied by the British SU Carburettor concern and the carbs used were designated HS2. These diminutive carbs, familiar to any English sports car fan, improved the acceleration and overall performance of the B4B which in turn accomplished Volvo's corporate desire to make the PV444 cars powered by these engines more attractive to the American audience, whose attention Volvo hoped to gain.

While B14A engines are considered rare in the US setting, they were even rarer in Europe. The production run lasted for one year. Some of the earliest P1900 roadsters were built with B14s but many of the short production of 67 of these open fiberglass cars received the replacement for the B14 — the B16.

== B16 ==
The B16A and B16B (single carb and twin carbs respectively) were a bored out 1,583 cc (1.6 L; 96.6 cu in) development of the B14A which in turn was sired by the B4B. These engines were fitted to the PV444 in its final two years (1957 and 1958), the Volvo PV544 in its 1958 introduction, as well as the companion estate and van versions known as Volvo P445, Volvo P210, and Volvo Duett. A new Volvo automobile introduced in 1956, known in some markets as the Volvo Amazon or Volvo 122 was the first production Volvo to sport this engine in any significant number although some of the later examples of the short-lived Volvo P1900 were also fitted with them. Other applications of this engine found use in marine, industrial and agricultural settings. The Volvo BM T425 tractor is one such example of a non-automotive use for the B16.

The exterior of the B16 resembled that of the B14, which it replaced. The block and the cylinder heads appeared to be similar at first glance. The B16B sported twin SU HS4 carbs, notably larger than the B14A's HS2 carbs. Also, the remote oil filter attached next to the water pump on the ignition distributor side of the engine on the B14 had been relocated to a housing under the intake and exhaust manifold side on the B16. The exhaust manifold which dumped centrally on the B14 now was made to exit towards the rear of the B16 manifold.

In automotive applications, the B16 was featured from 1957 to 1961 model years although in marine and industrial applications it was used for a number of years after. It was replaced in 1962 model year cars by the 5 main-bearing B18 engine of 1.8 litres which had been first seen by the automotive public in the 1961 Volvo P1800 sports car. With the discontinuation of the B16 also came the end of 6 volt electrical systems in Volvo cars.

== See also ==
- List of Volvo engines
