= Volvo 140 Series =

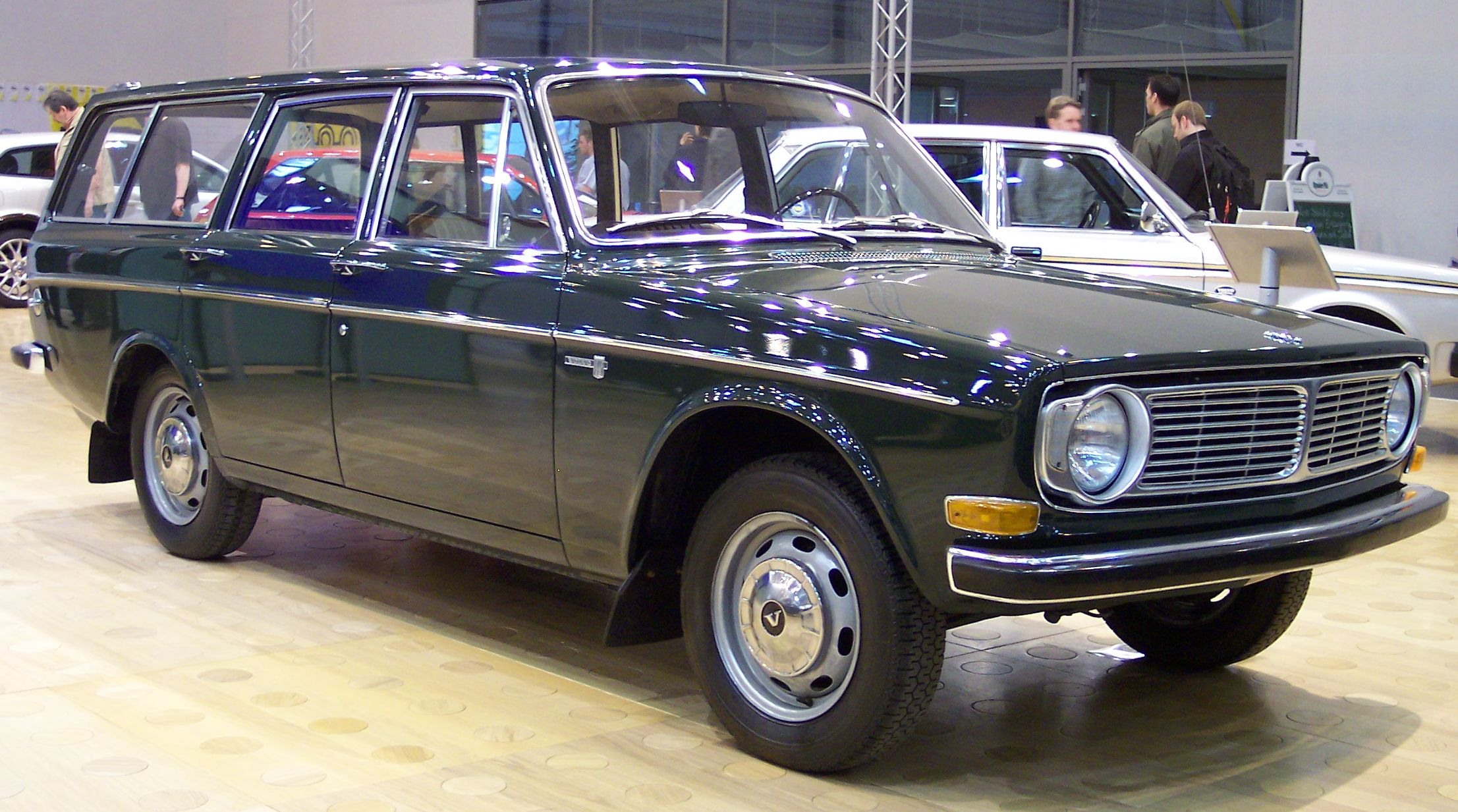
- Volvo 145

Overview
- Manufacturer: Volvo Cars
- Production: 1966–1974
- Assembly: Sweden: Torslanda (Torslandaverken); Belgium: Ghent (VCG); Canada: Halifax (VHA); Australia: Clayton, Victoria; Malaysia: Shah Alam (SMA); South Africa: Durban
- Designer: Jan Wilsgaard

Body and chassis
- Class: Executive car
- Body style: 2-door saloon (142); 4-door saloon (144); 5-door estate (145)
- Layout: FR layout
- Related: Volvo 164

Powertrain
- Engine: 1.8L B18A/B I4; 2.0L B20A/B/E/F I4
- Transmission: 4-speed manual; 3-speed Borg-Warner 35 automatic

Dimensions
- Wheelbase: 102.5 in (2,604 mm)
- Length: 183.1 in (4,651 mm) (1973–1974 144 saloon)
- Width: 68.1 in (1,730 mm) (1973–1974 144 saloon)
- Height: 56.7 in (1,440 mm) (1973–1974 144 saloon)
- Curb weight: 2,580 lb (1,170 kg) (142 base model); 2,898 lb (1,315 kg) (145 de Luxe)

Chronology
- Predecessor: Volvo Amazon; Volvo Duett
- Successor: Volvo 200 Series

The Volvo 140 Series is a line of mid-size cars manufactured and marketed by Volvo from 1966 to 1974 in two- and four-door saloon (models 142 and 144 respectively) as well as five-door estate (model 145) body styles, with numerous intermediate facelifts. More than a million Volvo 140s were built in 8 years.

== Introduction ==
Volvo Cars began manufacturing the Volvo 144 at Torslandaverken in the late summer of 1966 for the 1967 model year. The 144 series, which followed the Volvo Amazon (120 series, outside of Sweden), was the first Volvo to use a tri-digit nomenclature, where the first digit indicated series, second digit indicated the number of cylinders, and third digit indicated the number of doors. Thus, a "144" was a first series, 4-cylinder, 4-door saloon. The 144 was the first Volvo to feature a more rectilinear or boxy styling. Compared to the Volvo Amazon, the 140 was a radical departure with minimal exterior and interior carryover, notably a stylised version of the front split grille. The car's basic shape would survive into the 1990s as the 200 series. Mechanically, the car used many of the same drivetrain components as the Amazon, but also showcased many improvements, including disc brakes on all four wheels. It was named car of the year in 1966 by Swedish magazine Teknikens Värld. The engine in the standard 144 was the same as found in the standard Amazon (121), the 1.8l B18A, but the 144S was given the more powerful B18B from the 123GT and 1800S. Late in the 1967 model year production of the Volvo 142 (2-door saloon) began, in time to build 1500 units for the first year. In 1968 production of the Volvo 145 5-door estate began, completing the three body styles used in the 140 range.

== Model updates ==
For the 1969 model year Volvo enlarged the B18 to become the 2.0 litre B20 and replaced the generator with a more modern alternator. It was also in 1969 that Volvo introduced the 164, which shared much of the 140 series structure and styling aft of the windshield while incorporating a six-cylinder engine, the B30 which was simply a B20 with two more cylinders and a few strengthened and enlarged components. Volvo also introduced the Express this year (see below).

In 1970 a flow-through ventilation system, where vents were added towards the rear of the car (on the exterior under the rear window on the 142 and 144 and as a grille next to the right side taillight of the 145) and electrically defrosted rear windows, were introduced. The split rear side window on the 145 became one piece which was no longer possible to open.

In 1971 the first of several styling changes were introduced, including a revised black grille which saw the now ubiquitous Volvo diagonal line introduced as well as new wheels. A console on the transmission tunnel with a clock was now standard. Model year 1971 also saw the introduction of the B20E, which was a high compression version of the B20 which introduced Bosch D-Jetronic electronic fuel injection, giving a power figure of 124 PS (91 kW; 122 hp) DIN or 130 PS (96 kW; 128 hp) SAE. These new cars were either given the designation E (the German word Einspritzung, or "injection") or GL (for Grand Luxe), which was a more upmarket version of the car. The Grand Luxe received a four-speed manual with overdrive as standard fitment, with an automatic optional.

The styling changes continued in 1972 with the introduction of flush mounted door handles and a slightly revised dashboard with fake woodgrain trim, newly designed switches and a small central panel with a clock. The transmission tunnel was taken from the 164 as was the same short-shifter gear stick and the automatic transmission became controlled by a selector mounted on the floor at the same place. The outer rear seats now had the mounting points for retractable seatbelts. A low compression fuel injected engine (8.7:1), the B20F was introduced for the US and certain other markets.

In 1973 the 140 series received a major facelift, with a new plastic grille, new larger indicators and a completely revised tail end. Also, the S designation was dropped and the range consisted of three trim levels, standard (with no designation, known as L, or "luxe"), de Luxe, and the most upmarket, Grand Luxe. The interior also had a completely redesigned padded dashboard with a new instrument cluster consisting of dials rather than the strip speedometer previously used, rocker switches replacing the push-pull switches (with the exception of the headlight switch), and vents to direct air towards the person augmenting the defrost and floor vents. This dashboard in its basic form was carried over to the 200-series with only small modifications.

In 1974, the B20E/F engine switched from using the Bosch D-Jetronic to the K-Jetronic mechanical fuel injection system. Also, several safety changes were introduced including a fuel tank that was located close to the axle to protect it in the case of a rear-end collision, and larger bumpers that protruded more from the body. The quarter-light windows in the front doors were removed as a result of the improvements in ventilation inside the car, and small anodised aluminium strips were added to the bottom of the side windows. US-market cars received the emissions-scrubbed B20F engine producing 109 hp (81 kW; 111 PS) at 6000 rpm.

A total of 412,986 2-door saloons, 523,808 4-door saloons, and 268,317 5-door estates were produced.

In 1974, the 140 series evolved into the 240 series for the 1975 model year. The 164 was continued for another year in certain markets.

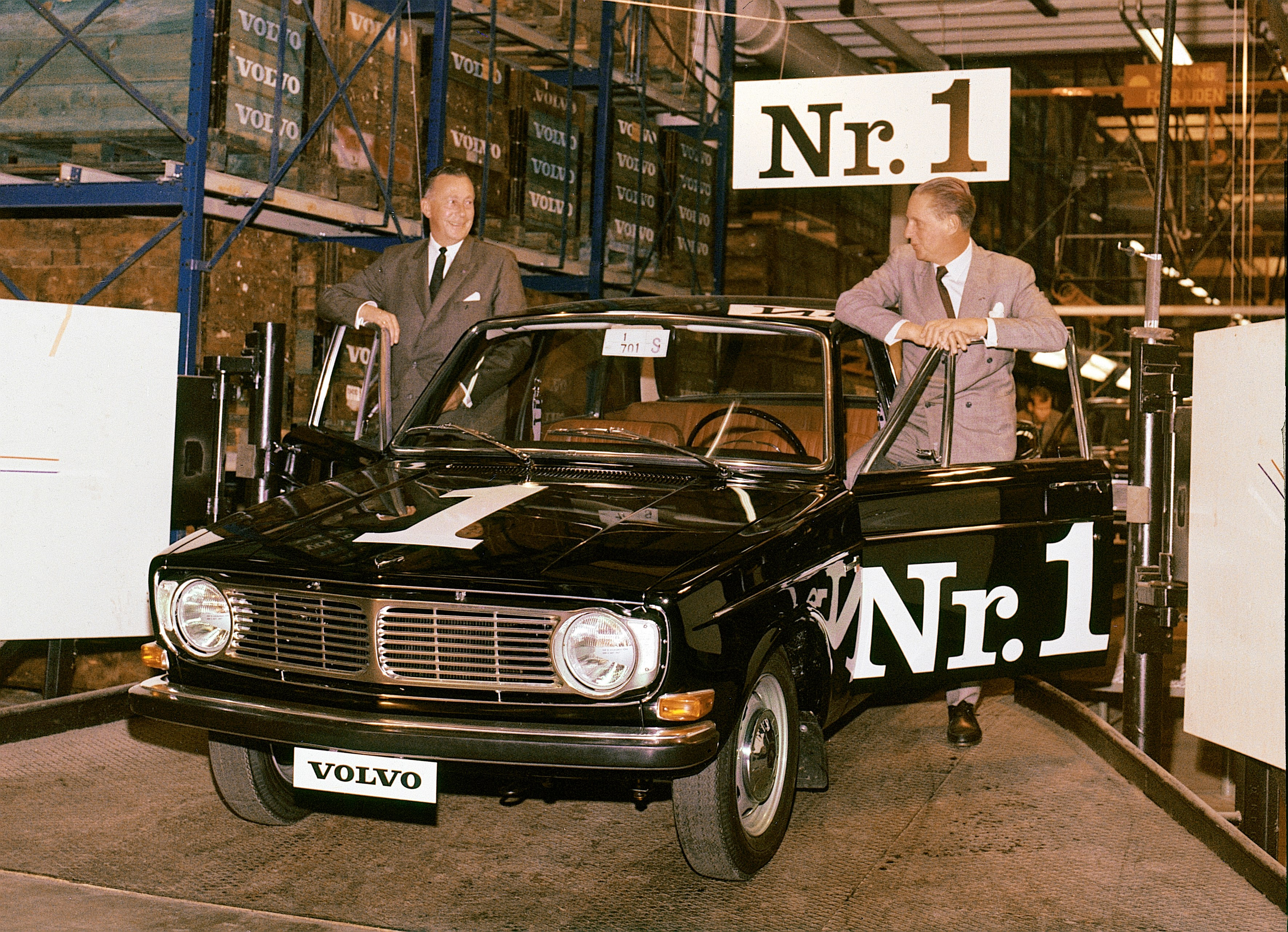
The first 144 to roll off the production line in August 1966

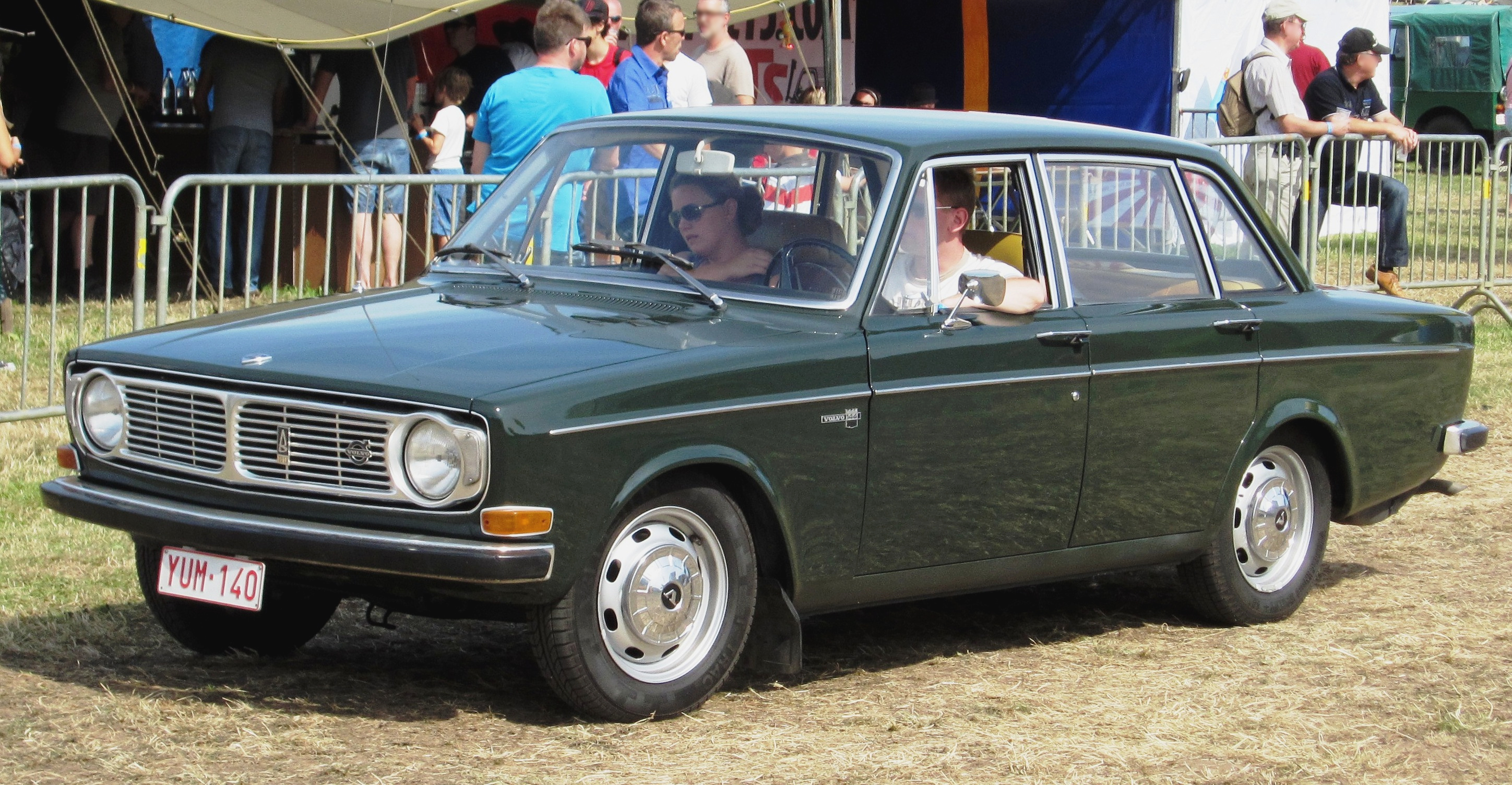
1968 (pre-facelift) Volvo 144 4-door saloon

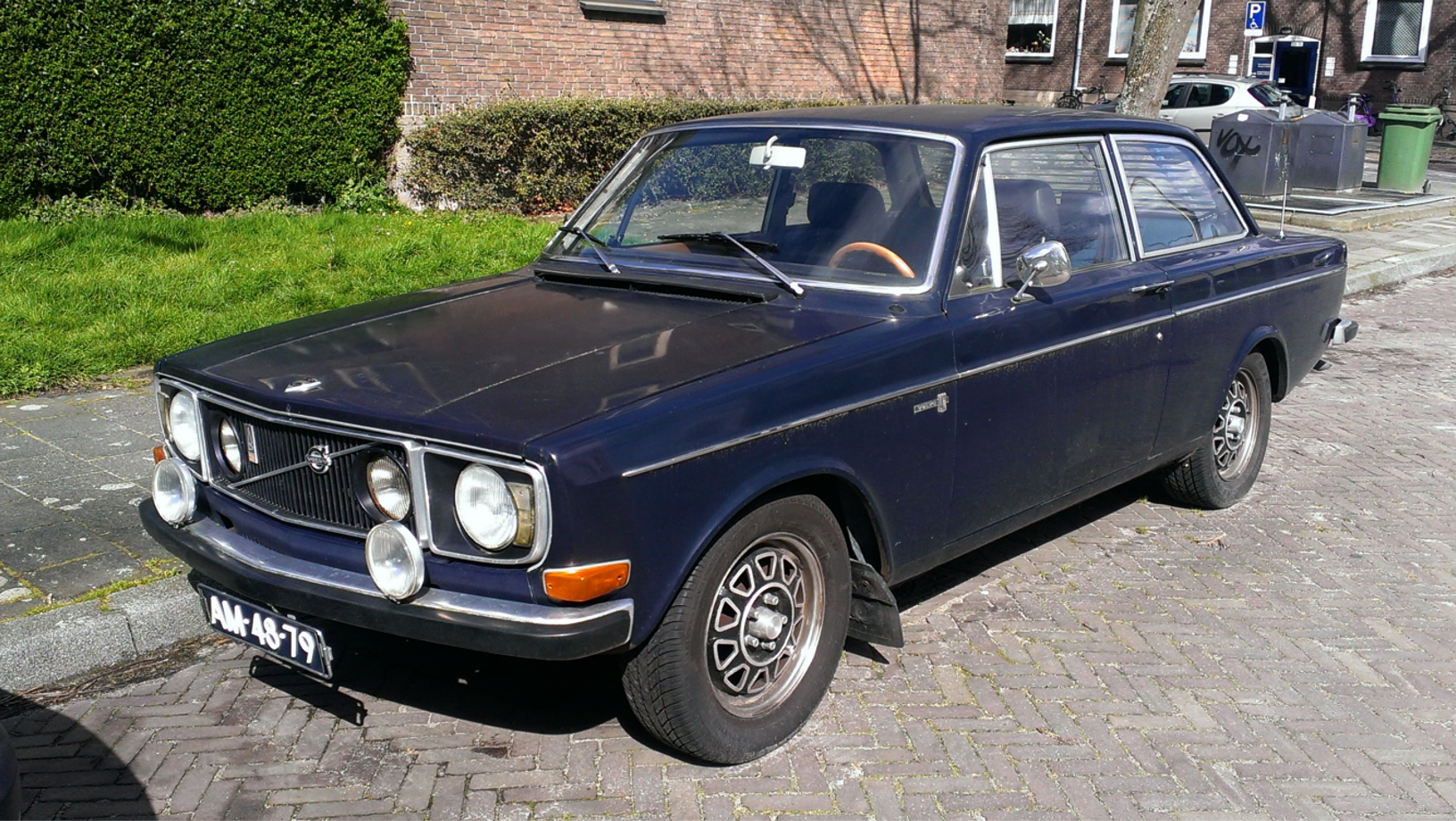
1970 Volvo 142 DL Automatic

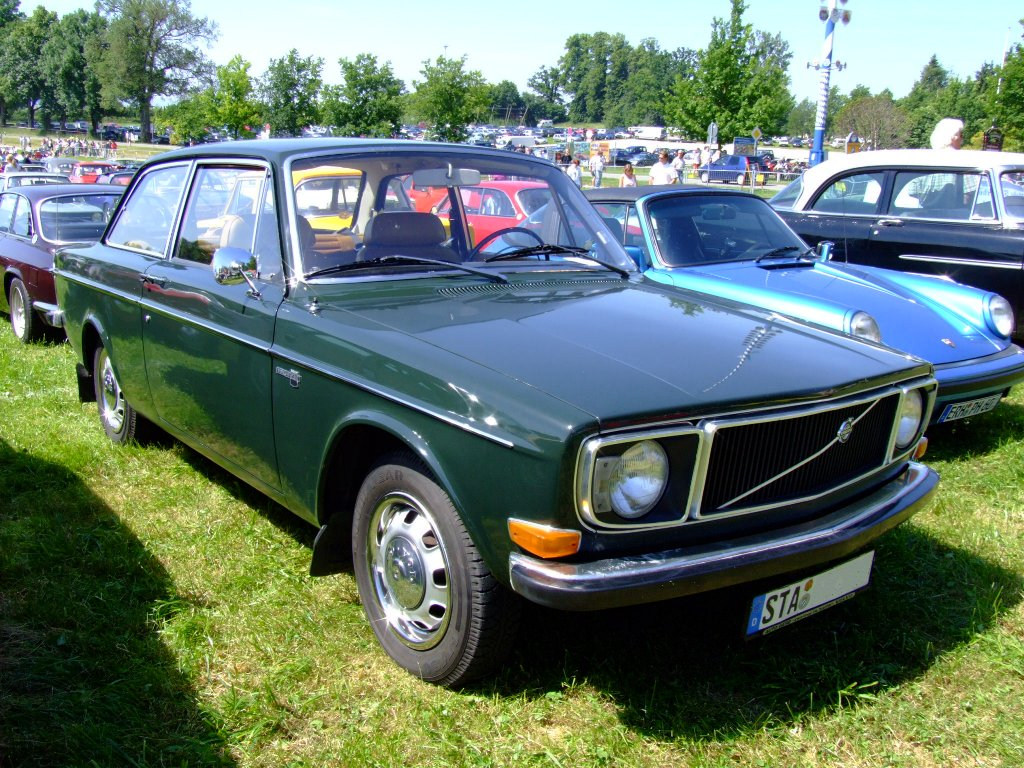
1971 (including first facelift) Volvo 142 2-door saloon

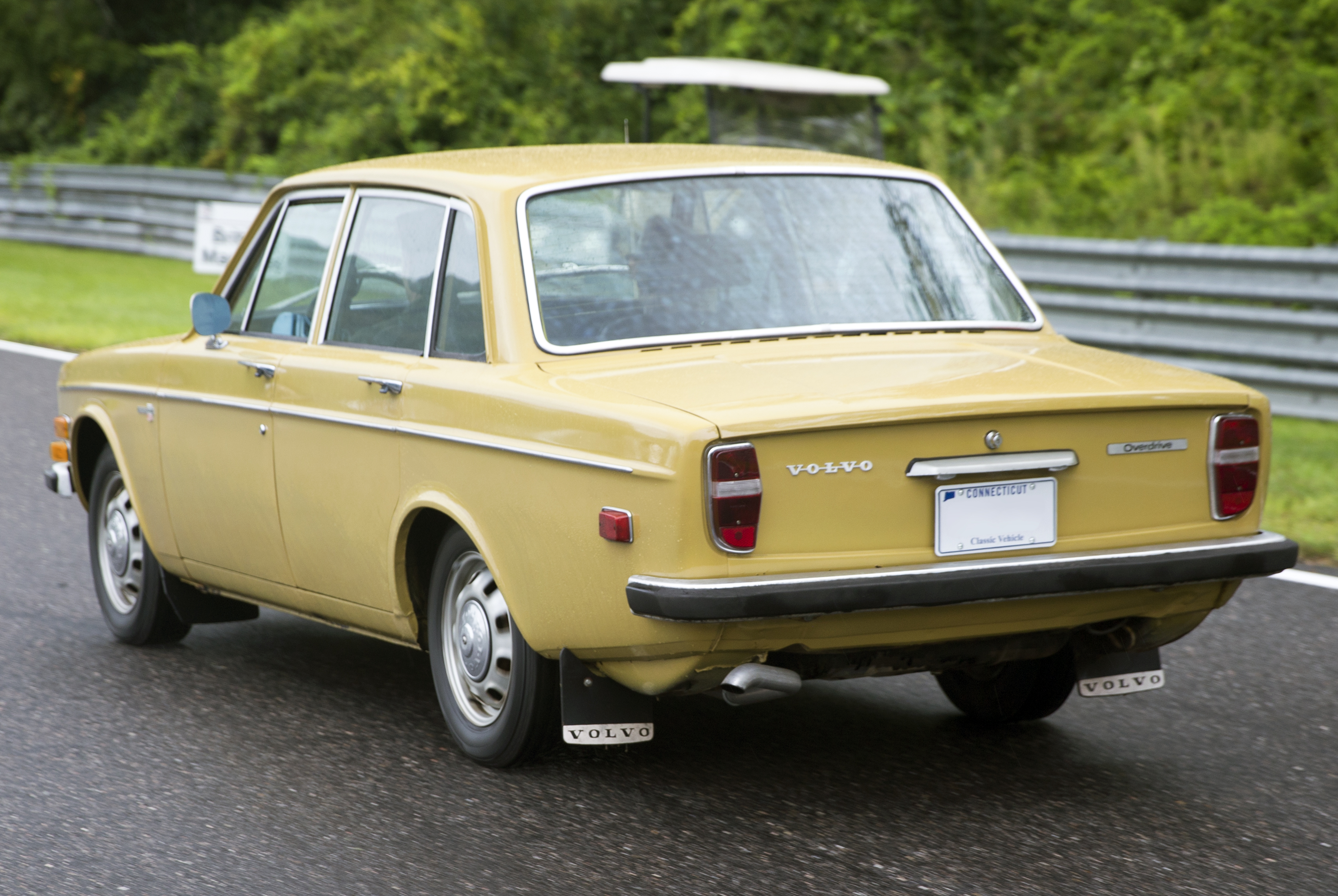
1971 Volvo 144S 4-door saloon (rear view)

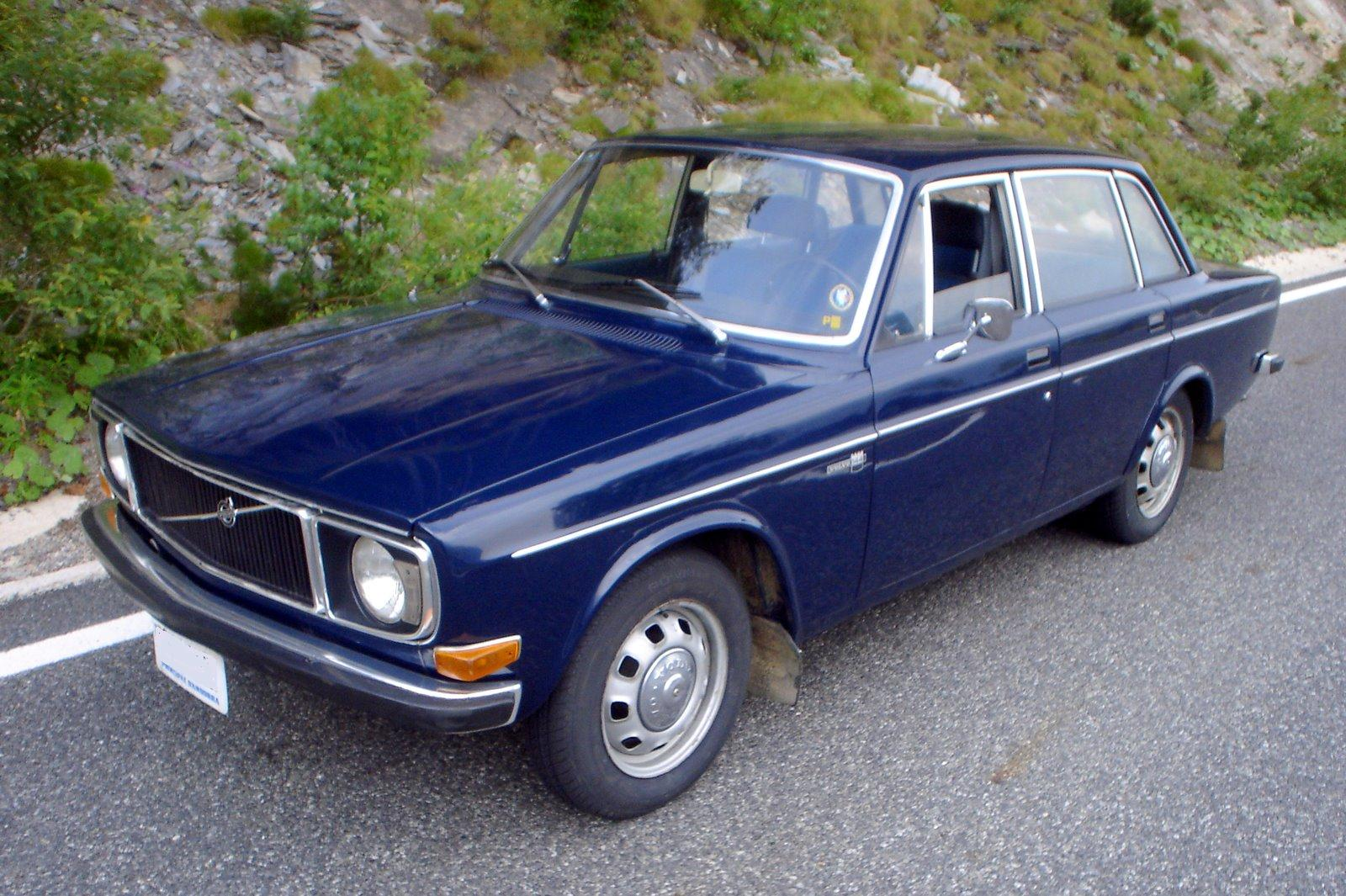
1972 Volvo 144 4-door saloon

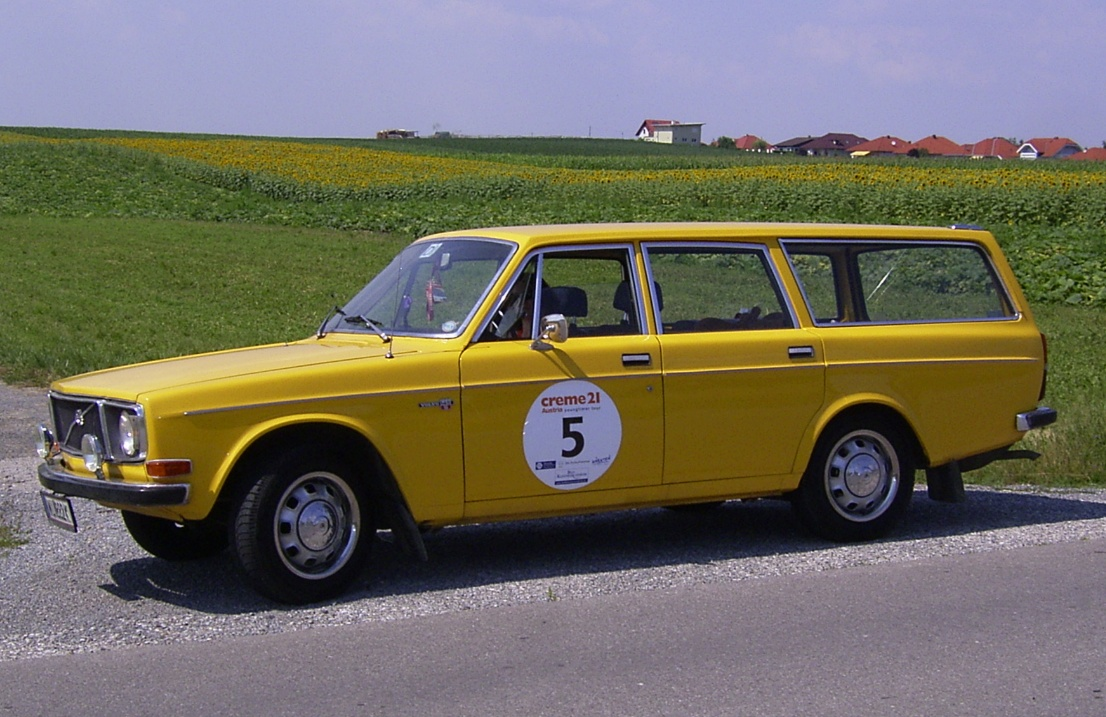
1972 Volvo 145 estate

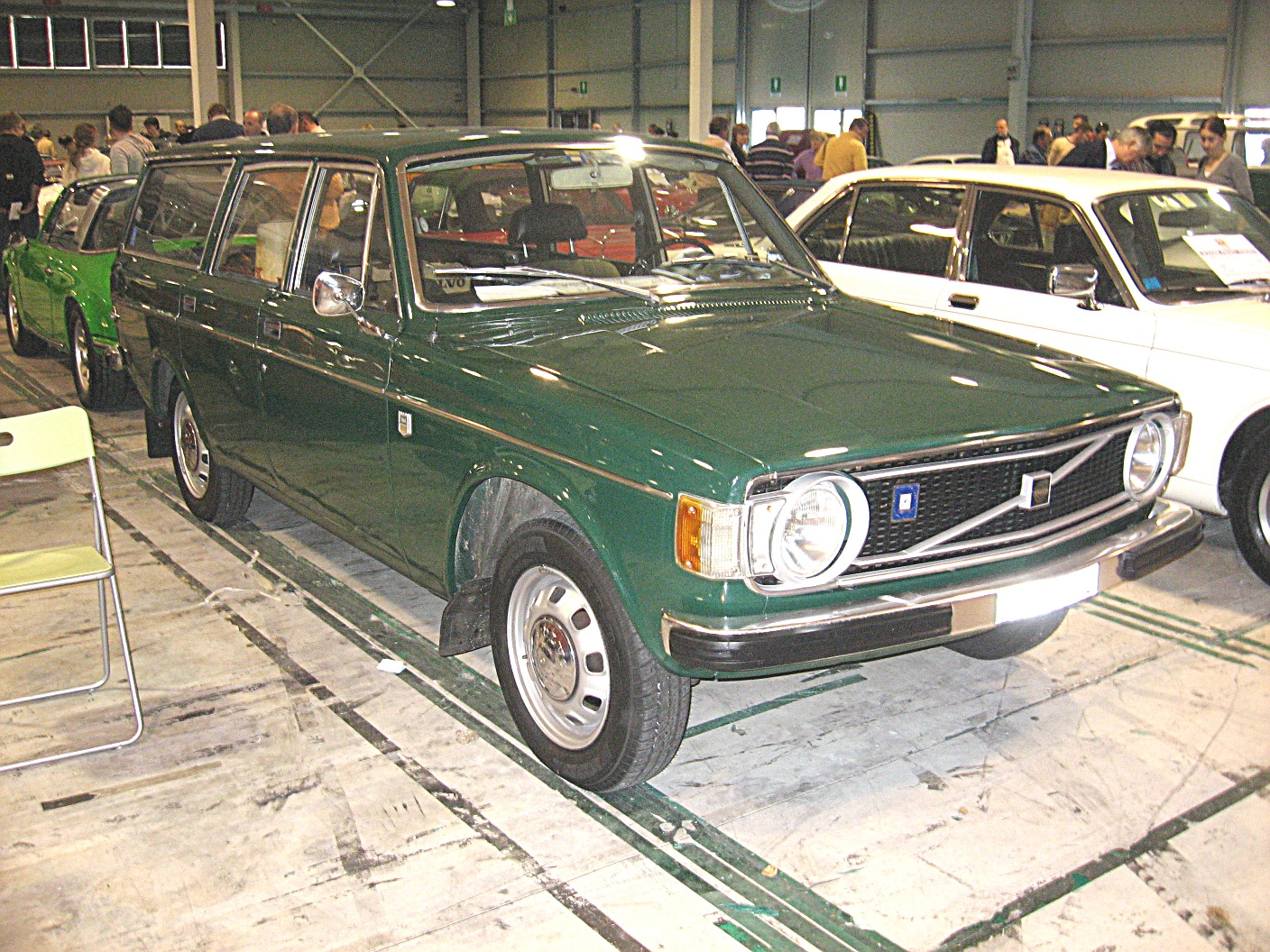
1973 Volvo 145 estate (second facelift)

== North Korean Exports ==
In 1973 Sweden established diplomatic relations with North Korea. Around 1000 Volvo 144 were ordered by North Korea and delivered, but apparently never paid for, with the outstanding debits still existing in 2026. The 144 remained one of the few western cars on North Korean roads for several decades.

== 145 Express ==
As a replacement for the Volvo Duett, Volvo produced a high roofed version of the Volvo 145 estate, known as the 145 Express. From the windscreen back, the roof was raised by approximately 5 cm (2 in), and from the B-pillar back it was raised again by about 30 cm (1 ft). It was available in three configurations: standard estate (full glazing and five seats with the option of an extra two rear-facing seats), fully glazed panel-van with only two seats, and a two-seater panel van with no glass in the rear doors and rear quarter panels. It found a niche market, and several coachbuilder firms later made Express versions of the 245. Its rear hatch was made of glass-reinforced plastic.

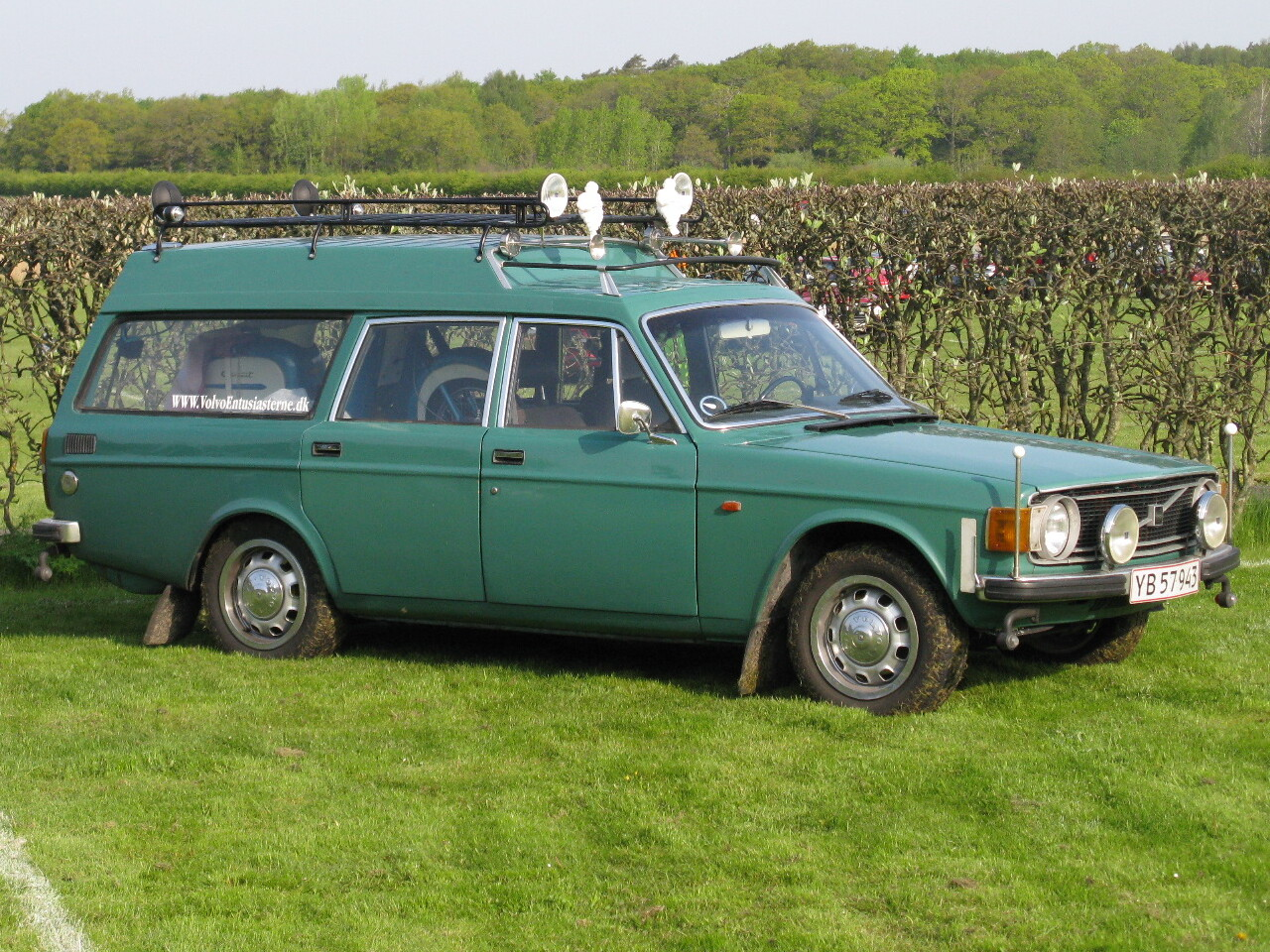
Volvo 145 Express

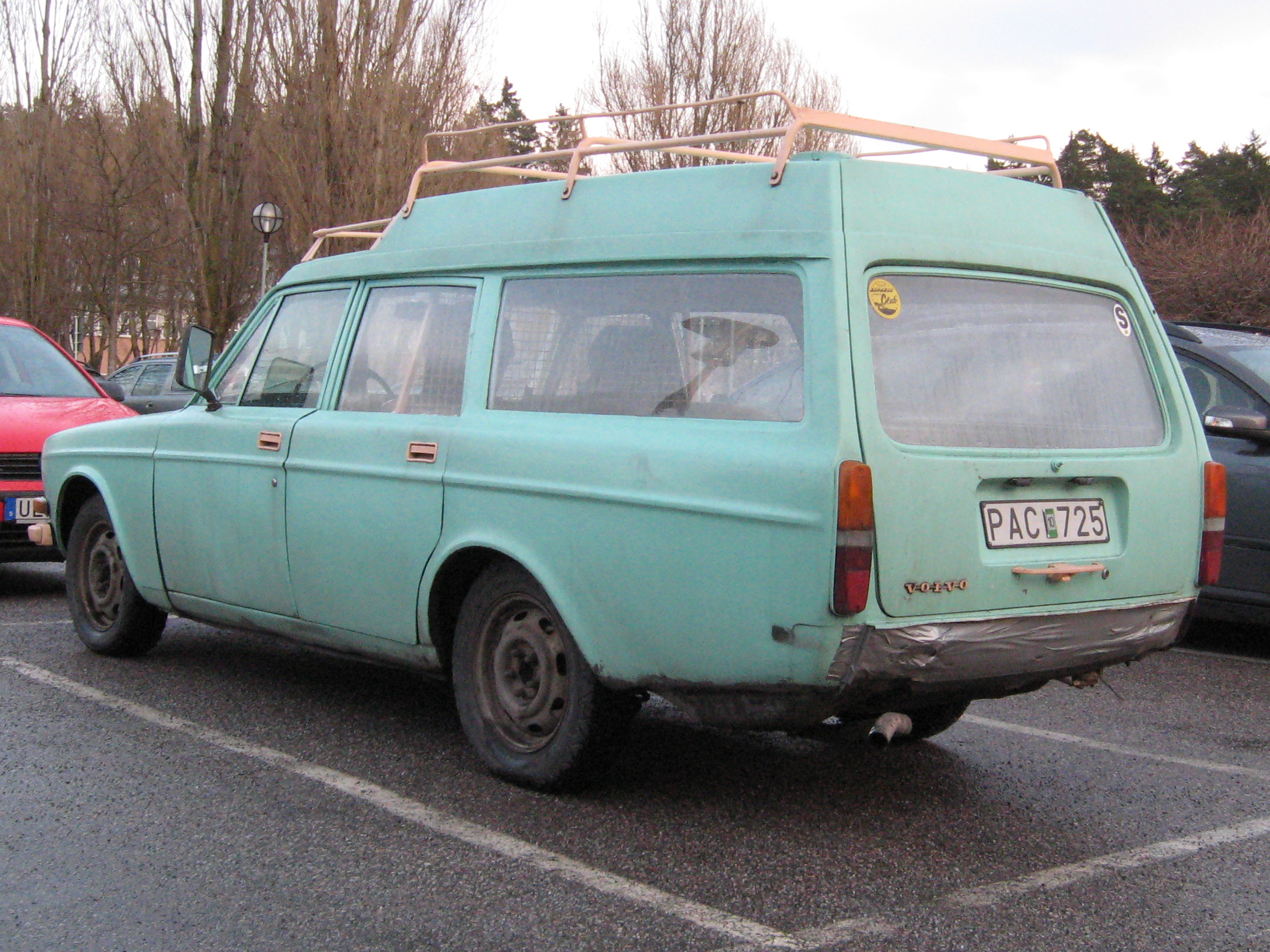
Volvo 145 Express (rear view)
