= Duett =

Duett may refer to:

- "Duett" (Rolf Løvland song), a Norwegian song
- Paraavis Tango Duett, a Russian paraglider design
- Volvo Duett, a Swedish automobile design
