= Volvo M40 transmission =

M40 and M41 are both four-speed gearboxes produced by Koping Engineering for Volvo. It was also available in a stronger version called the M400 and a three-speed version called the M30.

== Gear ratios ==
The gear ratios are:

Gear	M40	M41
1st	3.13	3.13
2nd	1.99	1.99
3rd	1.359	1.359
4th	1.00	1.00
Overdrive	-	0.77
Reverse	3.25	-

== Applications ==
- Volvo PV544
- Volvo Duett
- Volvo Valp
- Volvo Amazon
- Volvo P1800
- Volvo 140 Series
- Volvo 164
- Volvo 200 Series (1975 model year only)
