= M400 =

M400 may refer to:

- HKL Class M400, type of train on the Helsinki Metro
- Volvo M400 & M410 transmission
- DJI Matrice 400, a Chinese industrial drone
