= P210 =

P210 may refer to:

- SIG P210, a Swiss-designed pistol
- Pressurised versions of the Cessna 210 light aircraft
- Estate version of the Volvo PV444/544 (Volvo Duett)
