= Volvo GTZ =

Swedish concept cars

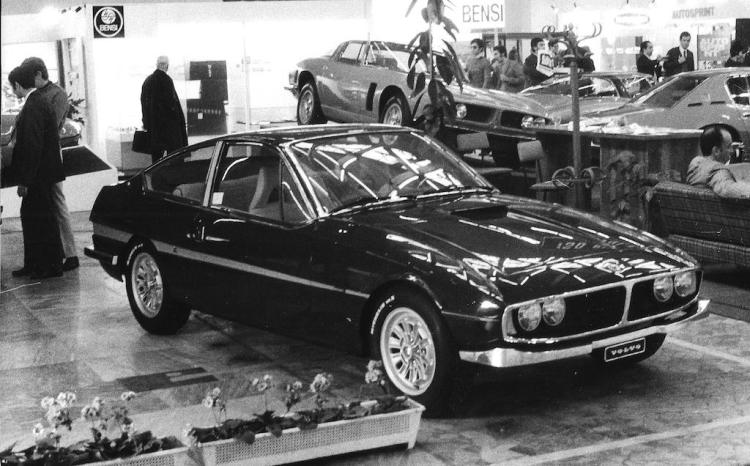
- Volvo GTZ at the 1969 Salone di Torino

Overview
- Manufacturer: Volvo Cars
- Also called: Volvo 2000 GTZ
- Production: 1969; 1 built
- Designer: Ercole Spada at Zagato

Body and chassis
- Class: Concept car
- Body style: 2-door coupé (2+2)
- Layout: FR layout
- Related: Volvo 140 Series

Powertrain
- Engine: 2.0 L B20 I4

The Volvo GTZ and GTZ 3000 are Swedish concept cars built for Volvo. Both were designed by Zagato, with the GTZ debuting at the 1969 Turin Auto Show on the Zagato stand and the GTZ 3000 debuting the following year at the 1970 Geneva Motor Show.

== History ==
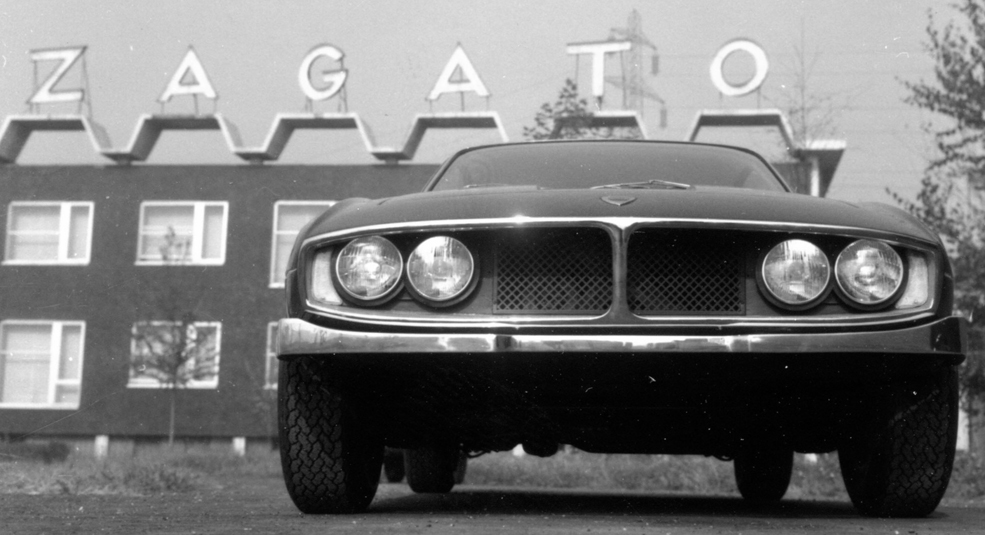
1969 Volvo GTZ in front of Zagato's headquarters in Milan

Motauto, the Italian importer for Volvo, commissioned the design for the GTZ in 1969 from Italian design house Zagato. Motauto had previously tried to influence Volvo to add another sports car offering to their lineup alongside the P1800, having already debuted an updated design by Carrozzeria Fissore for that car at the 1965 Turin Auto Show, as sports cars were very popular at that time in Italy. Volvo had, however, refused saying that they wanted to put more resources into the family cars they were known for and that the P1800 was selling well already so there was no need to update or replace it. The GTZ concept did find a private buyer at the Turin show but Volvo said they were not interested in producing it but hinted that they may be if the car were to be fitted with a different engine. The current whereabouts of the GTZ are unclear.

== Specifications ==
The GTZ is based on the underpinnings from the 140 Series, using an evolved version of that car's 2.0-litre B20 inline-four engine with two double-barrel Solex carburetors.

Volvo GTZ 3000
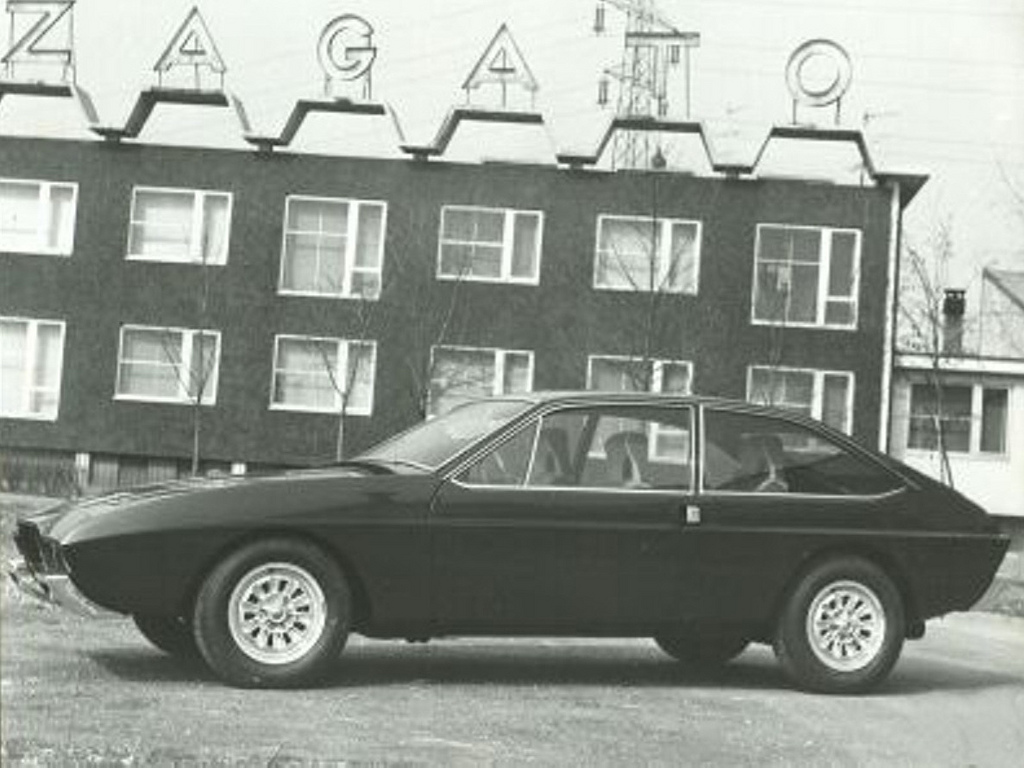

Overview
- Manufacturer: Volvo Cars
- Production: 1970; 1 built
- Designer: Ercole Spada at Zagato

Body and chassis
- Class: Concept car
- Body style: 2-door coupé (2+2)
- Layout: FR layout
- Related: Volvo 164

Powertrain
- Engine: 3.0 L B30 I6

== GTZ 3000 ==
The GTZ 3000 was introduced at the 1970 Geneva Motor Show as a refined version of the original GTZ concept. The GTZ 3000 was now based on the Volvo 164, powered by a 3.0 L B30 I6 engine. The engine produces 190 hp (142 kW) and could propel the concept to a top speed of 124 mph (200 km/h). The design for the GTZ 3000 was made using a wind tunnel for better aerodynamics, and was shorter, wider and lower than the 164, as well as 300 lb (136 kg) lighter. The design also featured pop up headlight panels similar to those used on the Alfa Romeo Montreal. The concept was received well at the Geneva show but Volvo decided not to move forward with production and after that Motauto stopped proposing new Volvo sports cars. Like the previous concept, the GTZ 3000 did find a private buyer at the Geneva show who drove it regularly in Italy, and today the car is known to still exist and as of 2008 was awaiting restoration in Sweden.
