= Volvo Margarete Rose =

1950s prototype automobile by Jan Wilsgaard

The Volvo Margarete Rose (internal code P179) was a prototype developed by Volvo in 1953 and 1954, designed by Jan Wilsgaard. It was planned as the complement to the PV 444. Some of the lines were reused on the Amazon, which also received variants of the front and rear suspensions of the P179. At 1,200 kg (2,646 lb), the prototype was much heavier than planned, and much too heavy for the 1.4-litre B14A engine. After the single P179 built rolled during a driving test it was scrapped.
