= Volvo M400 & M410 transmission =

The Volvo M400 is a gearbox from Volvo. It was used in Volvo 164 and in a modified version, a limited number of the early 1970 1800E. It is a stronger version of the M40 gearbox, designed to withstand the higher power of the B30 engine. Its drain plug is on the opposite side from that of the M40.

It was never factory-equipped with the "long stick" shifter handle. The shifter interchanges, opening up swap possibilities. Owners have found that while the bearings' lifespan might be similar to that of the M40, the torque capacity is on the order of double. Gear ratios are effectively the same (though derived from a different tooth count) as the M40s and followed that transmission's change to a lower (numerically higher) first gear beginning with the 1973 model year.

When equipped with the electrically operated overdrive, the gearbox was known as the M410.
