= Volvo B30 engine =

Volvo B30
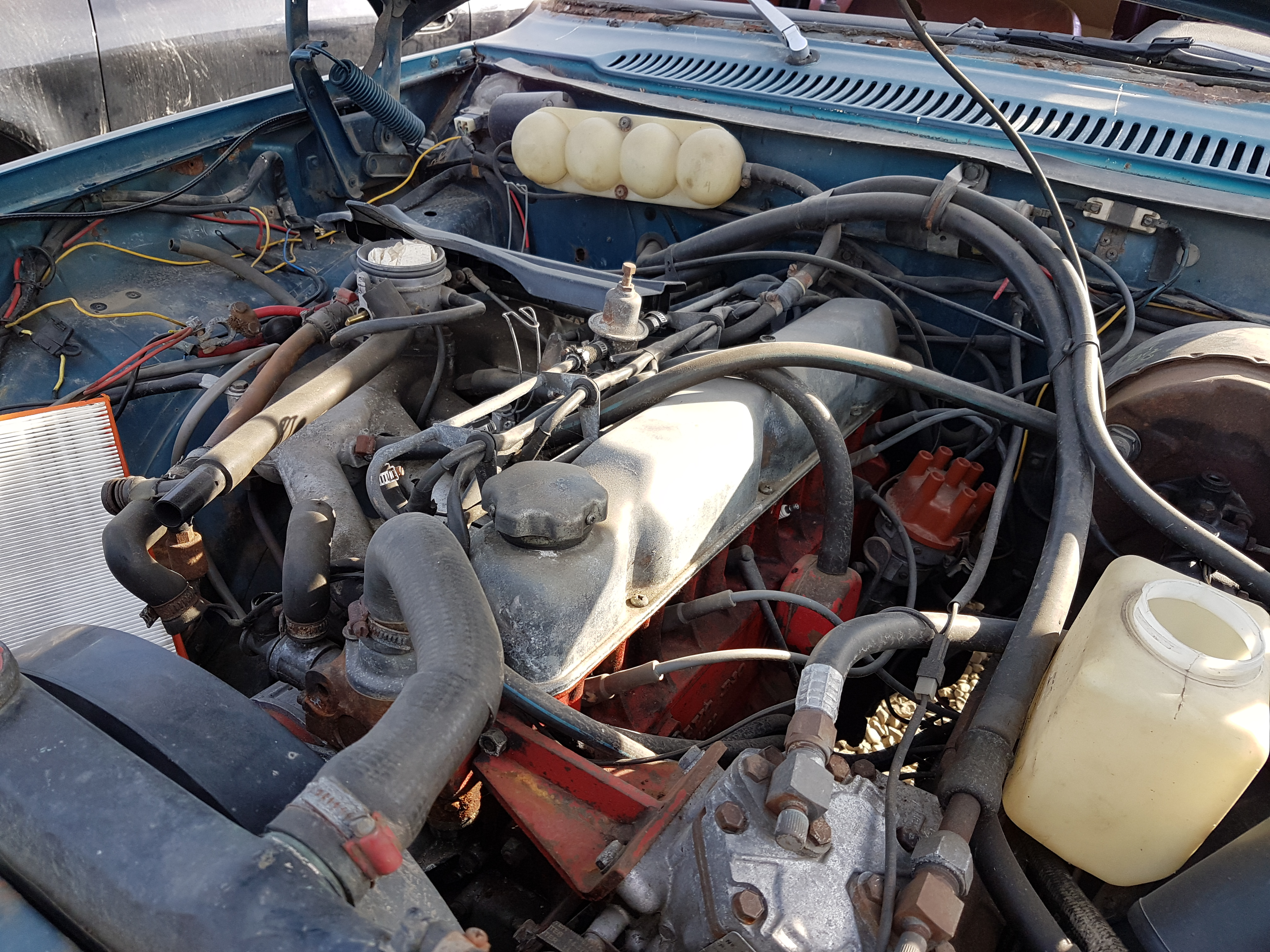

Overview
- Manufacturer: Volvo
- Production: 1969–1975

Layout
- Configuration: Inline-6
- Displacement: 3.0 L; 181.8 cu in (2,979 cc)
- Cylinder bore: 88.9 mm (3.5 in)
- Piston stroke: 80 mm (3.15 in)
- Cylinder block material: Cast iron
- Cylinder head material: Cast iron
- Valvetrain: OHV
- Compression ratio: 7.5:1, 8.7:1, 9.3:1, 10.0:1

RPM range
- Idle speed: 900 rpm

Combustion
- Fuel system: Zenith-Stromberg carburettor (B30A); Fuel injection (B30E/F)
- Management: Bosch D-Jetronic
- Fuel type: Petrol
- Oil system: Wet sump
- Cooling system: Water-cooled

Output
- Power output: 95 hp (70.8 kW) at 5000 (min); 175 hp (130.5 kW) at 5800 (max)
- Torque output: 105 lb⋅ft (142 N⋅m) at 3000 (min); 178 lb⋅ft (241 N⋅m) at 2500 (max)

The B30 is an inline-six automotive petrol engine produced by Volvo starting in 1968. It was used primarily in the Volvo 164 sedan from 1969 through 1975. The engine also appeared in military, marine, industrial, agricultural, and powercraft applications.

== History ==
In March 1958 Volvo launched Project 358 to design a new large model with Chief Designer Jan Wilsgaard taking the lead. The original plan for this car was to use the V8 engine that had been developed for the Volvo Philip concept car of 1952. That engine, which was later called the B36, was rejected in favour of a new inline six. The engine for Project 358 was developed by adding two cylinders to the existing B18, resulting in a six-cylinder engine with a displacement of 2.7 litres. Project B358 did not go into production, but most of the early work done on it was revived when development began on the 164, including the six cylinder engine.

Bore and stroke for the 164's engine were based on the larger B20 inline four, resulting in an engine displacing 3.0 litres. Due to their common heritage, many components are shared between the B20 and B30, including pistons, connecting rods, valves and valve-train parts.

The B30A was used in the Marcos GT from 1969 to 1972 and the Volvo C303 from 1974 to 1984. The B30 from the 164 was also used in the 1970 Volvo GTZ 3000 concept car.

Marine application versions of the B30 were sold by Volvo's Penta division. These engines carried designations AQ 95, AQ 165A and AQ 170A, B, or C. They were equipped with three down-draught carburettors. and P type camshaft.

== Technical detail ==
Like the B20 that it was developed from, the B30 has a cast iron block and cylinder head. The single camshaft is in the block, and operates the two overhead valves per cylinder through pushrods and rocker arms.

Cylinder bore and piston stroke is 88.9 mm × 80 mm (3.50 in × 3.15 in), giving a total displacement of 3.0 L; 181.8 cu in (2,979 cc). The B30/B30A version used twin 175CD2SE constant-depression Zenith-Stromberg carburettors. Both the B30E and B30F used the D-Jetronic fuel injection system from Bosch.

There are three major variations of this engine:

Engine	Year	Induction	Power	Torque	Camshaft	Compression	Notes
B30A	1969	2 Zenith-Stromberg carburettor 175-CD2-SE	145 hp (108.1 kW) at 5500 rpm	163 lb⋅ft (221 N⋅m) at 3000 rpm	C	9.3:1	Originally called the B30, this version was renamed B30A with the introduction of the B30E and B30F.
B30A	1970	2 Zenith-Stromberg carburettor 175-CD2-SE	145 hp (108.1 kW) at 5500 rpm	163 lb⋅ft (221 N⋅m) at 3000 rpm	C	9.3:1	Originally called the B30, this version was renamed B30A with the introduction of the B30E and B30F.
B30A	1971	2 Zenith-Stromberg carburettor 175-CD2-SE	145 hp (108.1 kW) at 5500 rpm	163 lb⋅ft (221 N⋅m) at 3000 rpm	C	9.3:1	Originally called the B30, this version was renamed B30A with the introduction of the B30E and B30F.
B30A	1972	2 Zenith-Stromberg carburettor 175-CD2-SE	145 hp (108.1 kW) at 5000 rpm	163 lb⋅ft (221 N⋅m) at 3000 rpm	C	9.3:1	Originally called the B30, this version was renamed B30A with the introduction of the B30E and B30F.
B30A	1972	2 Zenith-Stromberg carburettor 175-CD2-SE	95 hp (70.8 kW) at 5000 rpm	105 lb⋅ft (142 N⋅m) at 3000 rpm	C	7.5:1	Low-compression version built for the marine boats
B30A	1972	2 Zenith-Stromberg carburettor 175-CD2-SE	120 hp (89.5 kW) at 5000 rpm	142 lb⋅ft (193 N⋅m) at 3000 rpm	C	8.7:1	Low-compression version built for the US market.
B30A	1975-84	2 Zenith-Stromberg carburettor 175-CD2-SE	125 hp (93.2 kW) at 4250 rpm	162 lb⋅ft (220 N⋅m) at 2800 rpm	C	9.3:1	Volvo C303/C304/C306 civilian versions
B30A	1975-84	2 Zenith-Stromberg carburettor 175-CD2-SE	117 hp (87.2 kW) at 4000 rpm^{(1)}	152 lb⋅ft (206 N⋅m) at 2500 rpm^{(1)}	A	9.3:1	Volvo C303/C304/C306 military versions
B30E^{(2)}	1972	Bosch D-Jetronic fuel injection	175 hp (130.5 kW) at 5800 rpm	178 lb⋅ft (241 N⋅m) at 2500 rpm	C	10.0:1	
B30E^{(2)}	1973	Bosch D-Jetronic fuel injection	175 hp (130.5 kW) at 5800 rpm	178 lb⋅ft (241 N⋅m) at 2500 rpm	C	10.0:1	
B30E^{(2)}	1974	Bosch D-Jetronic fuel injection	175 hp (130.5 kW) at 5800 rpm	178 lb⋅ft (241 N⋅m) at 2500 rpm	C	10.0:1	
B30E^{(2)}	1975	Bosch D-Jetronic fuel injection	175 hp (130.5 kW) at 5800 rpm	178 lb⋅ft (241 N⋅m) at 2500 rpm	C	10.0:1	
B30F^{(2)}	1972-73	Bosch D-Jetronic fuel injection	138 hp (102.9 kW) at 5500 rpm	154 lb⋅ft (209 N⋅m) at 3500 rpm	C	8.7:1	Developed for lower emissions.
B30F^{(2)}	1974	Bosch D-Jetronic fuel injection	145 hp (108.1 kW) at 5500 rpm	160 lb⋅ft (217 N⋅m) at 2500 rpm	C	8.7:1	Developed for lower emissions.
B30F^{(2)}	1975	Bosch D-Jetronic fuel injection	130 hp (96.9 kW) at 5500 rpm	150 lb⋅ft (203 N⋅m) at 3500 rpm	C	8.7:1	Developed for lower emissions.
Notes:^{(1)} Outputs lower than civilian versions due to use of A-camshaft.^{(2)} The B30E and B30F versions featured larger valves and intake/exhaust ports.

In 1974 the number of bolts holding the flywheel increased from 6 to 8 and the size of the connecting rods was increased.

== See also ==
- List of Volvo engines
