= Volvo C303 =

Swedish military vehicle

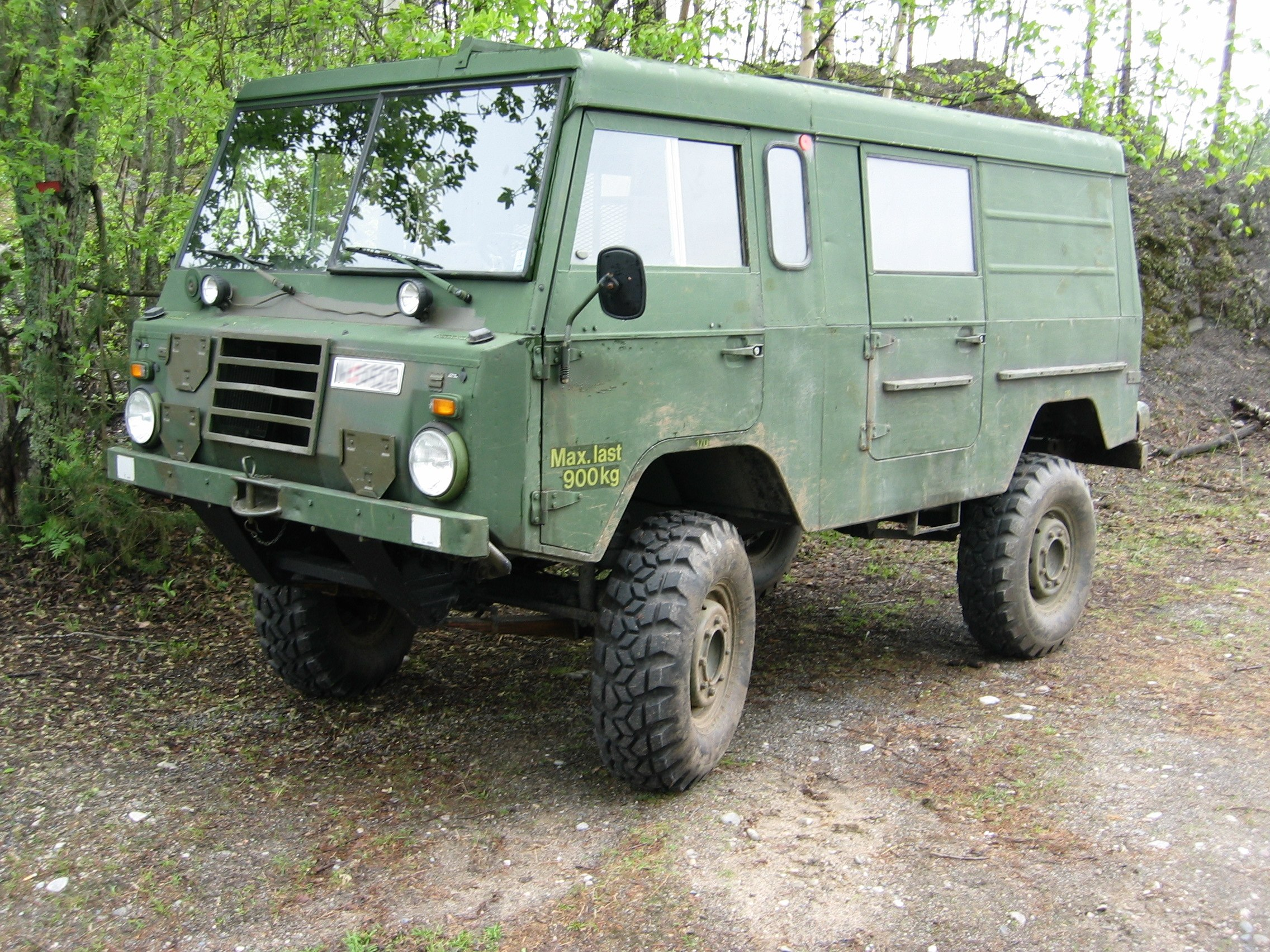

Overview
- Manufacturer: Volvo
- Also called: Tgb 11; Volvo C03 4x4
- Production: 1974–1984

Powertrain
- Engine: 3.0L B30 OHV I6

Dimensions
- Wheelbase: 2.3 metres (90.6 in)
- Length: 4.4 metres (173.2 in)
- Width: 1.9 metres (74.8 in)
- Height: 2.3 metres (90.6 in)
- Curb weight: 2,400 kg (5,291 lb)

Chronology
- Predecessor: Volvo L3314

Volvo C304
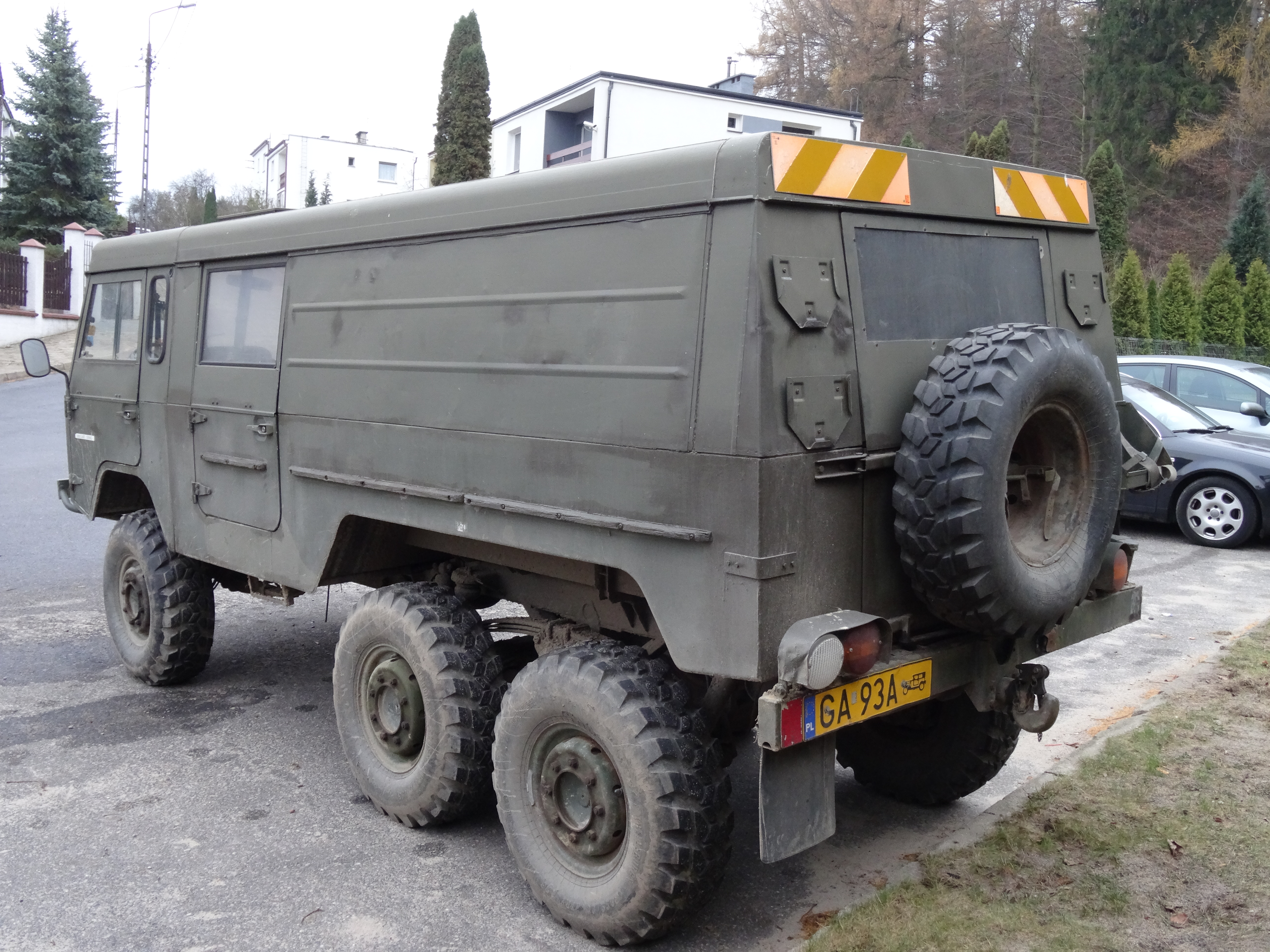
- Volvo C304 6x6, rear view

Overview
- Manufacturer: Volvo
- Also called: Tgb 13; Volvo C03 6x6-1-V
- Production: 1974–1984

Powertrain
- Engine: Volvo B30

Dimensions
- Wheelbase: 2.3 metres (90.6 in) + 1.0 metre (39.4 in)
- Length: 5.4 metres (212.6 in)
- Width: 1.9 metres (74.8 in)
- Height: 2.3 metres (90.6 in)
- Curb weight: 2,900 kg (6,393 lb)

Volvo C306
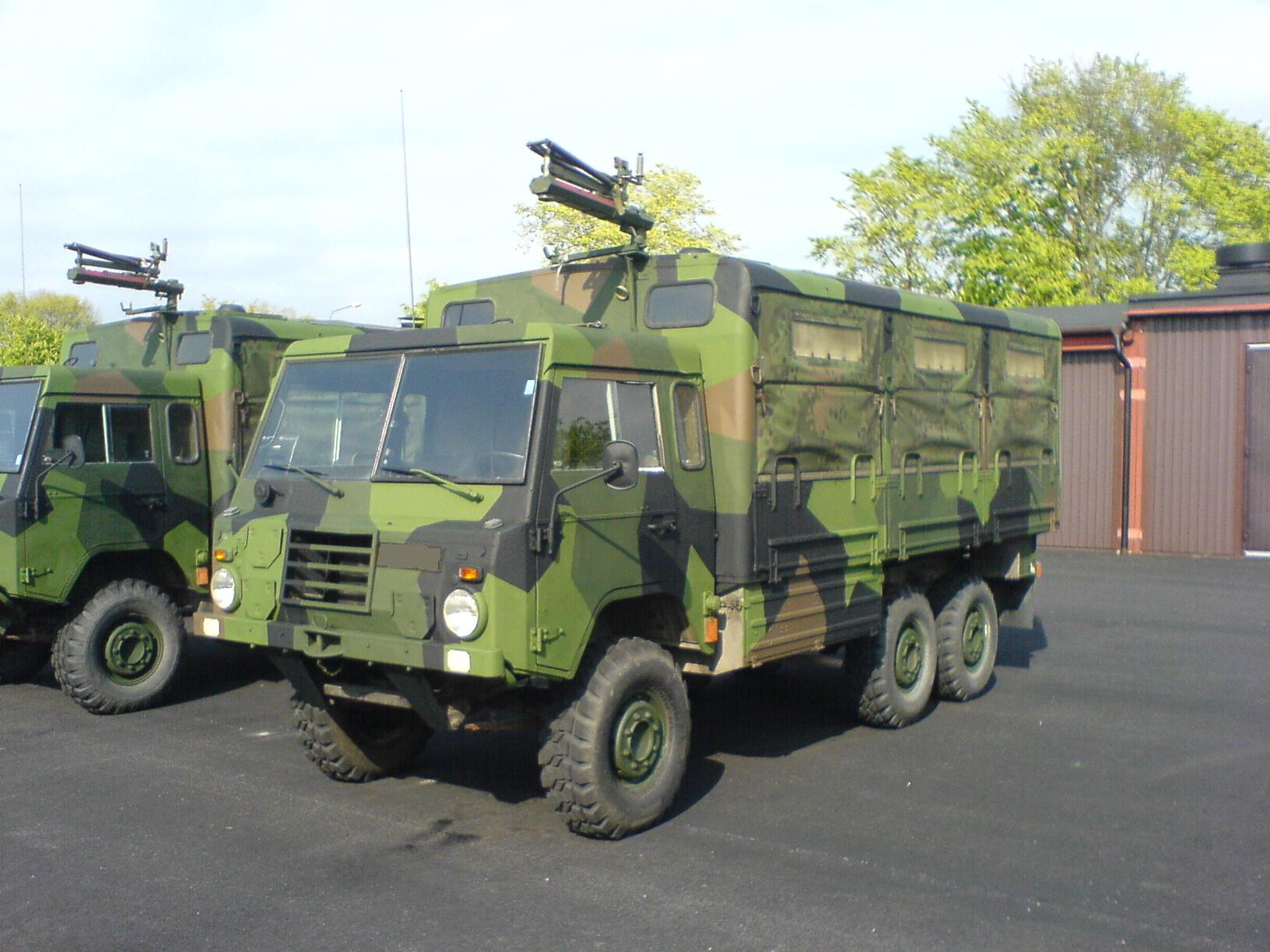

Overview
- Manufacturer: Volvo
- Also called: Tgb 20; Volvo C03 6x6-5-V
- Production: 1974–1984

Powertrain
- Engine: Volvo B30

Dimensions
- Wheelbase: 2.7 metres (106.3 in) + 1.0 metre (39.4 in)
- Length: 6.1 metres (240.2 in)
- Width: 2.15 metres (84.6 in)
- Height: 2.8 metres (110.2 in)
- Curb weight: 3,390 kg (7,474 lb)

Chronology
- Predecessor: Volvo L2204

Volvo Cross Country C303 (Tgb 11, A.K.A "Terrängbil 11", translated as "Terrain Vehicle 11") is the base model of a range of military vehicles produced by Volvo.

The car was developed in the late 60s based on the successful L3314 series and went into production in 1974. This version was produced both as a 4x4 and a 6x6. An 8x8 was planned but dropped. Engines were the B30 (B20 in the prototypes) from Volvo's civilian cars. The C3 series feature portal axles with locking differentials resulting in very high ground-clearance (similar to the Unimog) and outstanding performance offroad. The cars are narrow to make it possible to navigate between trees and on narrow forest roads.

They were also sold to civilian customers for rescue services, electricity companies etc. and private use. In the Swedish army the vehicles are designated "Terrängbil xx" (or "Tgb" for short) where "xx" is a number defining the type of vehicle. See table below.

In the 1983 Paris-Dakar rally a Volvo C303 won the class for trucks under 10 tonnes.

A total of 8,718 vehicles of the C3 series were made. Roughly 75% of these went into military service, with the remaining sold to civilian contracts. It was used by the Malaysian Army c. 1970–1990, the Royal Malaysian Police, and civilian users like Telekom Malaysia c. 1980s.

== Variants ==
- 4x4 versions (C303)
  - Tgb 11, basic hardtop model
  - Tgb 1111, soft-top model, fitted with the Pvpj 1110 90 mm recoilless antitank gun
  - Tgb 1112, hardtop model equipped with an array of radio and telephone equipment
  - Tgb 1113, hardtop model equipped with an array of radio and telephone equipment
- 6x6 versions (C304)
  - Tgb 13, basic hardtop model
  - Tgb 1313, hardtop model equipped with an array of radio and telephone equipment, much larger than the Tgb 1112
  - Tgb 1314, hardtop model designed as an ambulance
  - Tgb 1321, hardtop model equipped with radios, usually used to choreograph artillery batteries
- 6x6 versions (C306)
  - Tgb 21, troop carrier, with room for up to 19 soldiers
  - Tgb 22, troop carrier (11 soldiers) and transport for RBS 70 anti-aircraft missile

== Data ==
- Top speed: about 100 km/h (62 mph)
- Engine: Volvo B30A petrol
- Power: 125 hp (93 kW) at 4200 rpm
  117 hp (87.2 kW) at 4000 rpm for the military editions
- Torque: 224 N⋅m (165 lb⋅ft) at 2500 rpm
  206 N⋅m (152 lb⋅ft) at 2500 rpm for the military editions
- Weight:
  - C303/tgb 11: 2,400 kg (5,291 lb), total 3,300 kg (7,275 lb)
  - C304/Tgb 13: 2,820 kg (6,217 lb), total 4,400 kg (9,700 lb)
  - C306/Tgb 20: 3,390 kg (7,474 lb), total 5,700 kg (12,566 lb)
- Dimensions:
  - C303/Tgb 11: length 4,350 mm (171.3 in), width 1,930 mm (76.0 in), height 2,170 mm (85.4 in)
  - C304/Tgb 13: length 5,350 mm (210.6 in), width 1,930 mm (76.0 in), height 2,170 mm (85.4 in)
  - C306/Tgb 20: length 6,050 mm (238.2 in), width 2,140 mm (84.3 in), height 2,800 mm (110.2 in)
- Volume 2,982 litres
- Leaf springs rear and front
- Brakes: Drums on all wheels
  - dual, semi-redundant system, dual vacuum servo assist
- Tyres: 8.90"×16", 285/80-16 or 9.00"×16"
- Fuel tank: 85 litres

=== Military ===
- Angola: Used by the People's Armed Forces for the Liberation of Angola
- Estonia: Used by the Military of Estonia
- Latvia: Used by the Latvian Land Forces
- Lithuania: Used by the Lithuanian Land Forces
- Malaysia: Used by the Malaysian Army (c. 1970–1990), Royal Malaysian Police
- Sweden: Used by the Swedish Army

=== Civilian users ===
- Telekom Malaysia (c. 1980s).
- Vägverket, the Swedish public roads administration.
- Vattenfall, the then Swedish state owned power company.
- SSRS, The Swedish voluntary sea rescue society.
- Numerous fire brigades in Sweden.

=== In popular culture ===
The Volvo C303 and C304 could possibly be an inspiration for the Autobello Stambecco, a fictional vehicle in the soft-body physics game BeamNG.drive. The Stambecco is also based on the Steyr-Puch Pinzgauer, of similar design.

== See also ==
- Pinzgauer High-Mobility All-Terrain Vehicle
- Unimog
- Land Rover 101 Forward Control
- UAZ SGR
