= Volvo 164 =

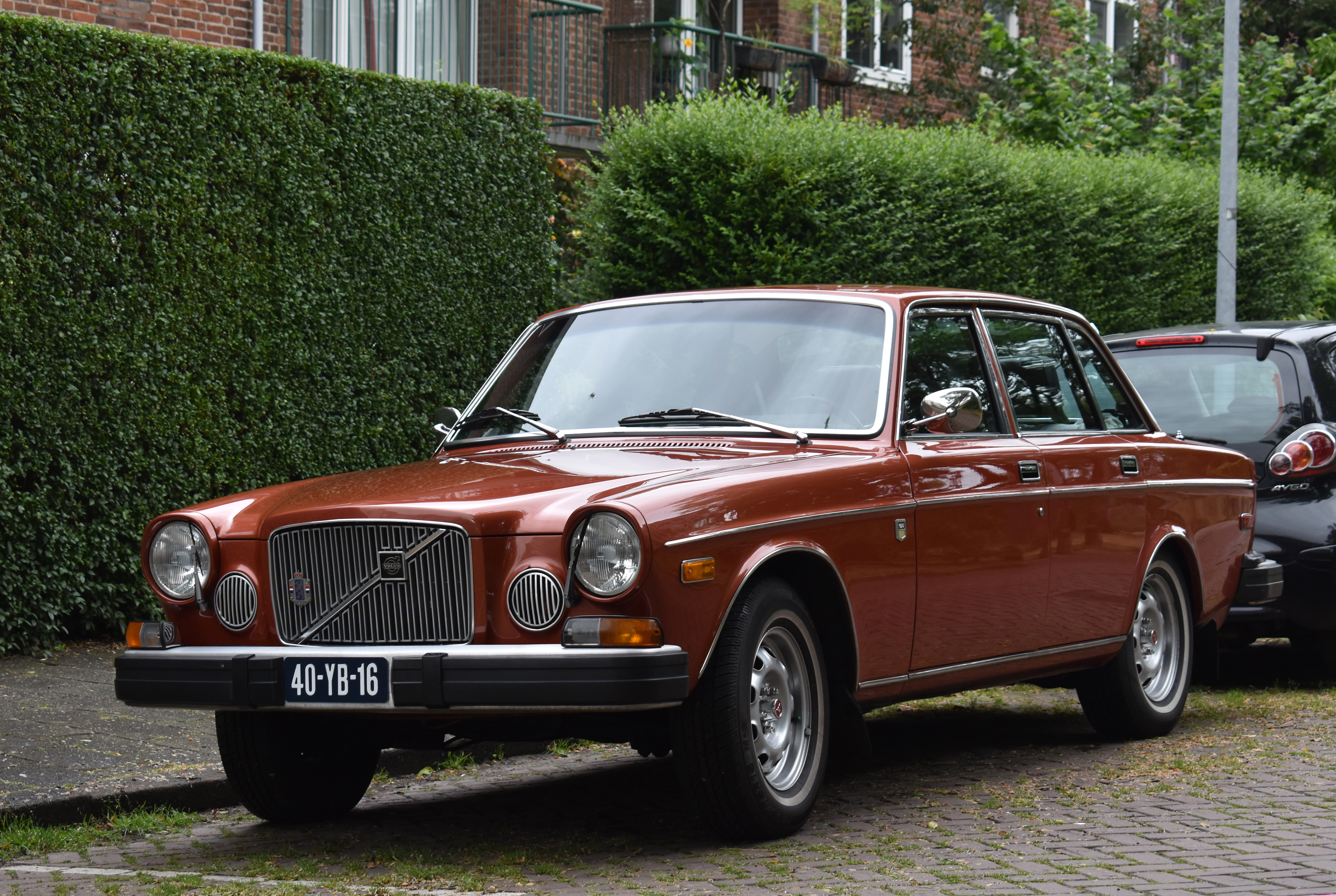

Overview
- Manufacturer: Volvo Cars
- Production: 1968–1975
- Model years: 1969–1975
- Assembly: Sweden: Torslanda (Torslandaverken); Sweden: Kalmar (VKA); Australia: Melbourne, Victoria (Motor Producers Ltd); South Africa: Durban; Malaysia: Shah Alam (SMA)
- Designer: Jan Wilsgaard

Body and chassis
- Class: Mid-size luxury / Executive car (E)
- Body style: 4-door saloon
- Layout: FR layout
- Related: Volvo 140 Series; Volvo GTZ 3000

Powertrain
- Engine: 3.0L B30 I6
- Transmission: 4-speed Volvo M400 manual; 4-speed Volvo M410 manual with overdrive; 3-speed Borg-Warner 35 automatic

Dimensions
- Wheelbase: 2,700 mm (106.3 in)
- Length: 4,714 mm (185.6 in)
- Width: 1,730 mm (68.1 in)
- Height: 1,440 mm (56.7 in)
- Curb weight: 1,451 kg (3,199 lb)

Chronology
- Successor: Volvo 264

The Volvo 164 is a 4-door, 6-cylinder luxury saloon unveiled by Volvo at the Paris Motor Show early in October 1968 and first sold as a 1969 model. 146,008 164s were built before the car was succeeded by the mid-size luxury 264 in 1975, although some sources state 153,179 were built). The 164 was Volvo's first venture into the luxury segment since the end of PV 60 production in 1950, and was the first six-cylinder Volvo since the PV800 last produced in 1958.

== History ==
Jan Wilsgaard designed what would eventually become the 164 in the late 1950s as a concept car called the P358 and powered by a V8 engine. The front styling somewhat resembles the Wolseley 6/99 and the Volvo P1900., more so by the Ferrari 375 Agnelli, which influenced the Jaguar XJ as well.

In 1968 Volvo introduced the 164 as a luxury version of their 140 series. The wings, the grille, the front bumper, the bonnet, the headlamp bezels, and the front indicators were all unique to the 164; to accommodate the long inline 3-litre 6-cylinder engine the 164's wheelbase, wings and bonnet were longer than those of the 4-cylinder 140. From the windscreen onwards the car body was essentially the same as in the 140 series. The interior featured a simulated woodgrain dashboard face and leather seating surfaces. Introduced the same year as the BMW E3, the 164 was Volvo's answer to the Mercedes-Benz 250 and Jaguar XJ6. The 164 compared favourably in terms of fuel economy with similarly sized 6-cylinder European cars such as the BMW 530.

in 1972 an update saw the introduction of fuel injection to the 164 with the B30E (high compression) and B30F (low compression) engines which utilised Bosch D-Jetronic injection. Also for 1972 the dash was slightly revised with he introduction of a centre console and some of the dash switches, as well as the clock, were moved to it as well as being redesigned. The flush mounted pull style door handles also appeared for the 1972 model year.

In 1973 the 164 received a major facelift including new rear and side lamps, a new slightly flatter grille and a straight front bumper. A new instrument cluster and dashboard which included air ducts was the same that was introduced to the 140 series, too.

In 1974 the 164 received new massive safety bumpers. The doors were revised and strengthened and the vent wings were eliminated due to the panel vents introduced in 1973, and the 164 became one of the earliest cars to offer heated seats. The instrument cluster changed slightly with the introduction of the bulb failure indicator and the fuel gauge received revised markings with the 1/2 mark moved to the centre of the gauge and the red reserve section shrinking significantly. Underneath, the floor pan was revised and the fuel tank was moved from the boot floor to closer to the rear axle for better protection in the case of an accident.

A limited edition of the 164, the 164TE was made only in 1974 and only for 3 markets, Great Britain, Germany and Australia. The 164TE had extra accessories fitted as standard, being air conditioning, 4 speaker 8 track player with radio, headlight wipe/wash system, rear head rests, rear reading lamps and a fully carpeted boot with lighting. This more upmarket version was only available in 3 colours, being metallic light blue (colour 111), metallic copper (colour 105) and metallic teal (colour 115).

For 1975 (1976 in America and Japan) the 164 was replaced by the 264 which was powered by the PRV 2.7-liter V6 engine. The PRV engine was not immediately able to meet Federal emissions standards, so the 164 was kept in limited production for one more year for the American and Japanese markets – although only small numbers were sold. The 164 received new, larger six-panel rear lamps sometime during the 1975 model year, electronic ignition, new seats, electric windows in the front, a new style of badging, extensive changes to the rear suspension, and the parking brake handle was moved from outboard to inboard of the driving seat. Due to much of the changes coming from the 200 series, as the 200 series switched to metric bolt patterns, the 164 uses a mix of imperial and metric bolt patterns on the car.

== Engine and powertrain ==
The 164 was powered by a 3-litre overhead-valve B30 engine, a 6-cylinder derivative of the B20 4-cylinder engine that powered most other Volvo models.

1969–1971 models were all equipped with dual Zenith Stromberg 175CD2SE constant-depression carburettors. In 1972, Bosch's first volume-production electronic fuel injection system, D-Jetronic, was offered as optional equipment. Carburettors were dropped and "D-Jet" became standard equipment for the 1974 model year. Cars equipped with the fuel injection were badged as 164E models, the "E" standing for einspritzung (German for "injection"). Like other fuel-injected Volvos, the 164E models gave improved performance and driveability with less toxic exhaust than their carburettored counterparts.

Performance:

Volvo 164E 160 PS (118 kW) DIN. Acc 0–100 km/h 8.7 sec. Acc 0–160 km/h 24.4 sec. Top speed 193.5 km/h.

Volvo 164E automatic 160 PS (118 kW) DIN. Acc 0–100 km/h 11.9 sec. Acc 0–160 km/h 35.2 sec. Top speed 188 km/h.

References: Autozeitung nr 8-1972 and Autozeitung nr 1–1973.

== Transmission ==
Transmission options included a manual 4-speed M400 gearbox, which was known as the M410 when equipped with the optional electrically operated Laycock de Normanville overdrive. Both the M400 and M410 had Volvo's "remote control" shift mechanism, which used a conventionally short, vertical shift stick placed between the front seats; manual-shift models other than the 164 and the P1800 continued until 1971 to use Volvo's direct-control shifter with an extremely long, almost horizontal shift lever with its pivot point well under the dashboard. A 3-speed automatic transmission, the BW35 made by Borg-Warner, was also offered. The automatic shift selector was mounted on the steering column from 1969 through 1971, and on the floor from 1972 through 1975. Despite its rough operation and inefficiency, the BW35 was popular in the North American and Australian markets.

== Body and chassis ==
The 164 was offered only as a 4-door saloon, and shares many body and chassis components with the 144. From the cowl rearward, body sheetmetal is identical with the exception of the remote shifter transmission tunnel, which was added to the 140 series in 1972. The front of the 164 was extended 6 cm and the wheelbase gained 10 cm to accommodate the length of the 6-cylinder engine.

== Descendants ==
When developing the Volvo 262C coupé in the mid-seventies, Volvo employed a 164 as a testbed. The resulting two-door "162" with a chopped and vinyl-covered roof—features that were eventually applied to the 262C—is on permanent display at the Volvo Museum in Gothenburg, Sweden. As of 2016, the Volvo counterpart of the 164 is the S90.

== Gallery ==
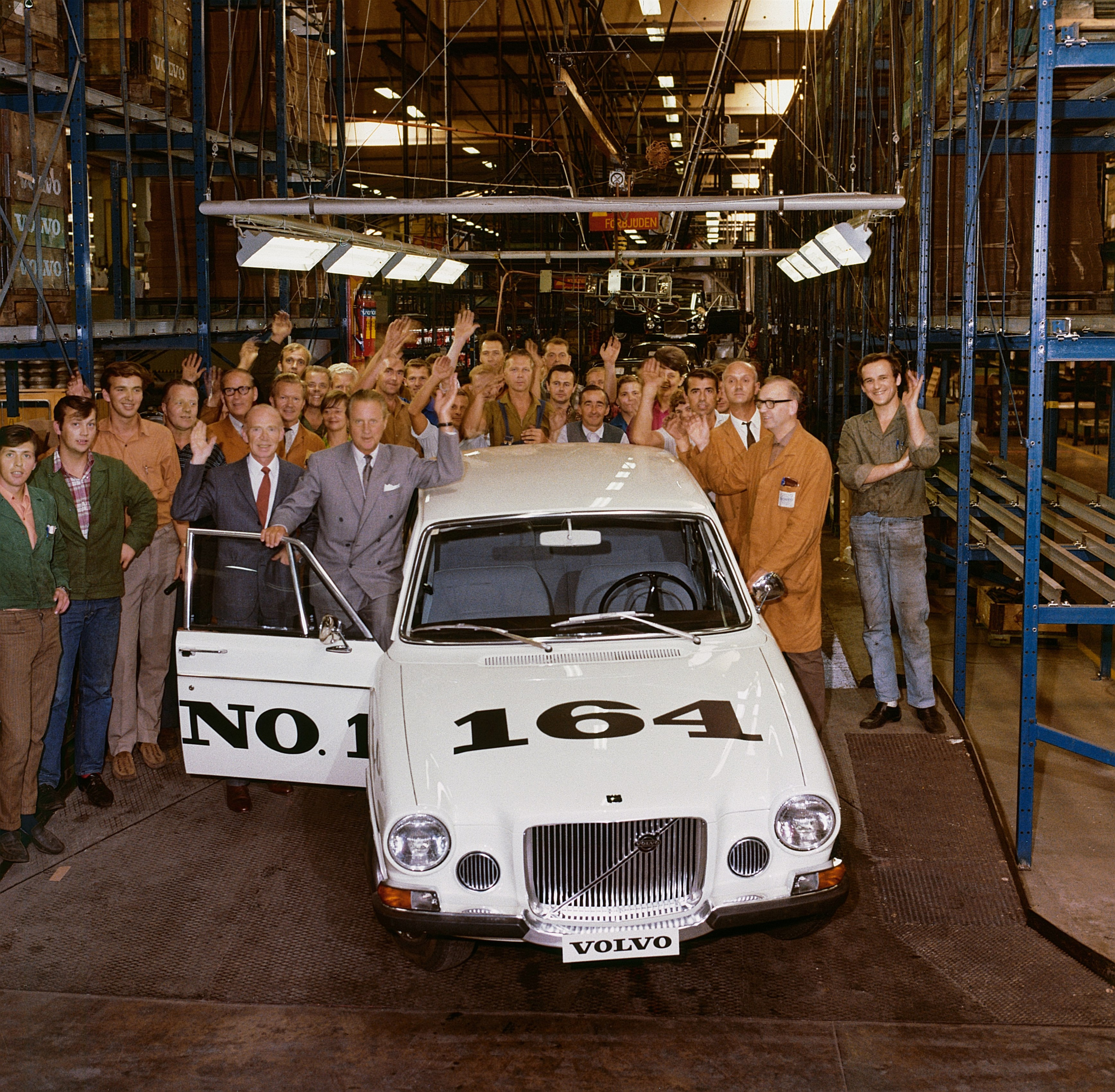
The first 164 to roll off the production line in 1968.

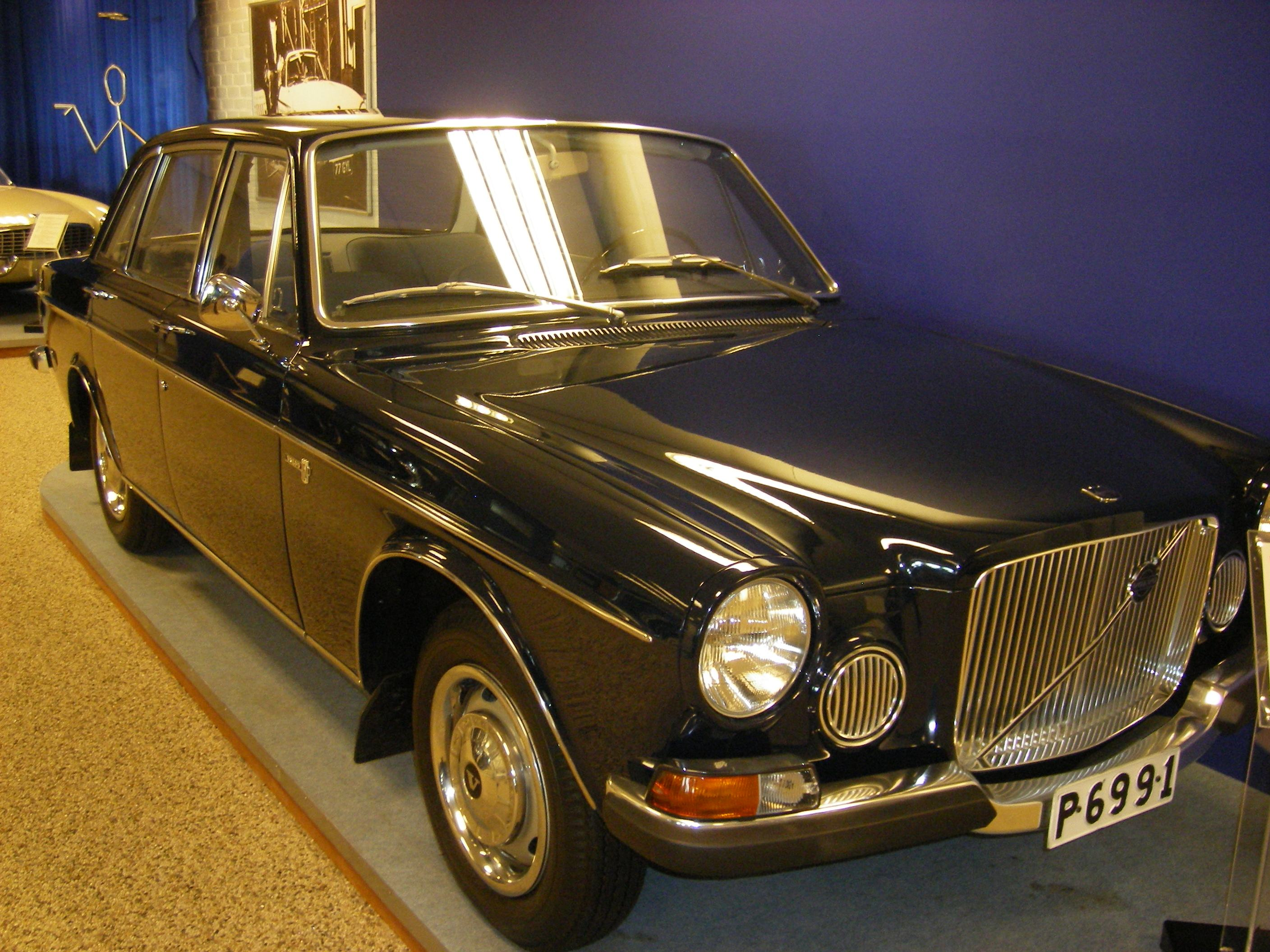
1969 Volvo 164 on display at the Volvo Museum in Gothenburg.

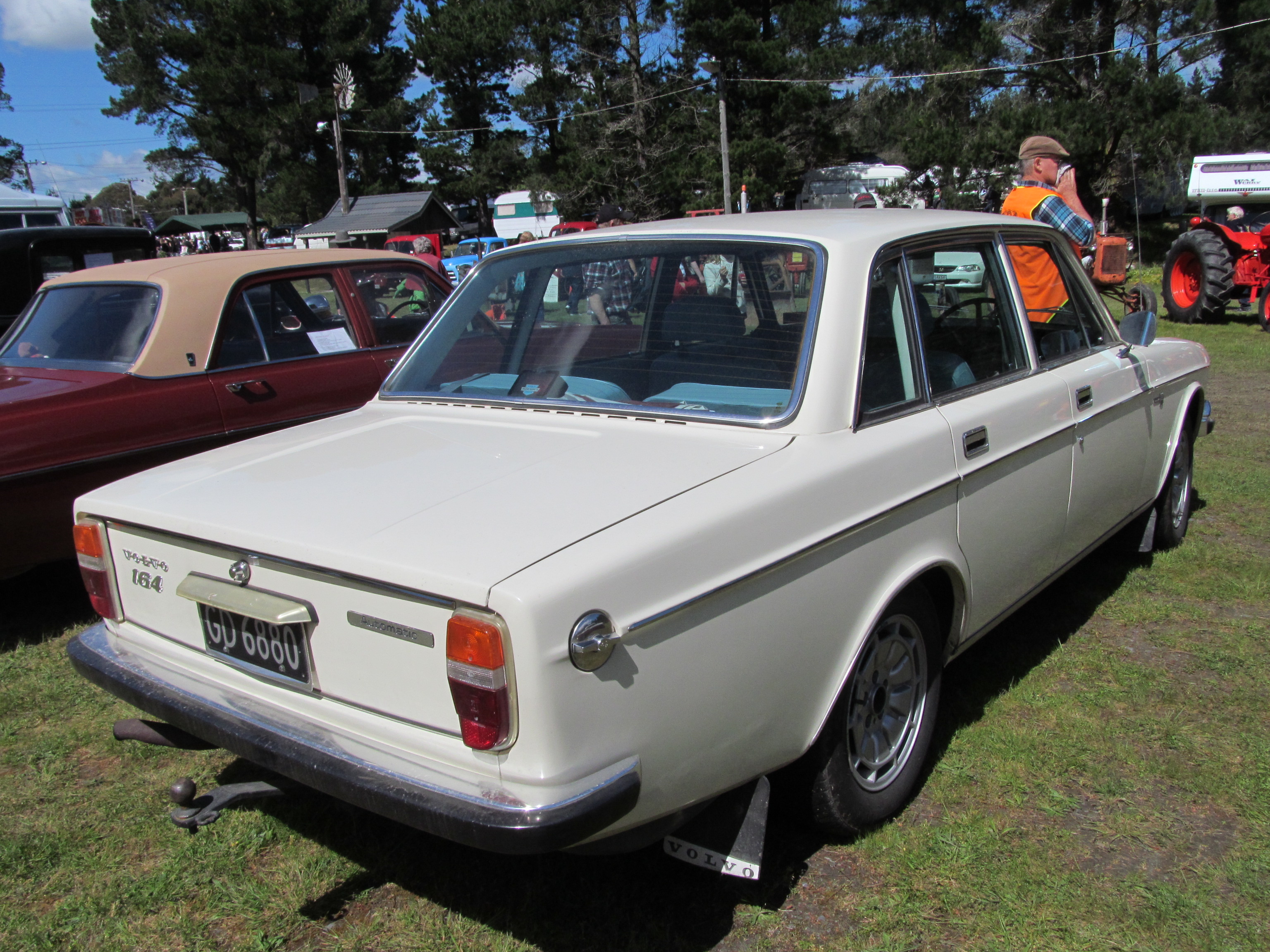
1972 164 rear illustrating tail end used from 1969 to 1972. Also shown is the Volvo accessory locking fuel cap

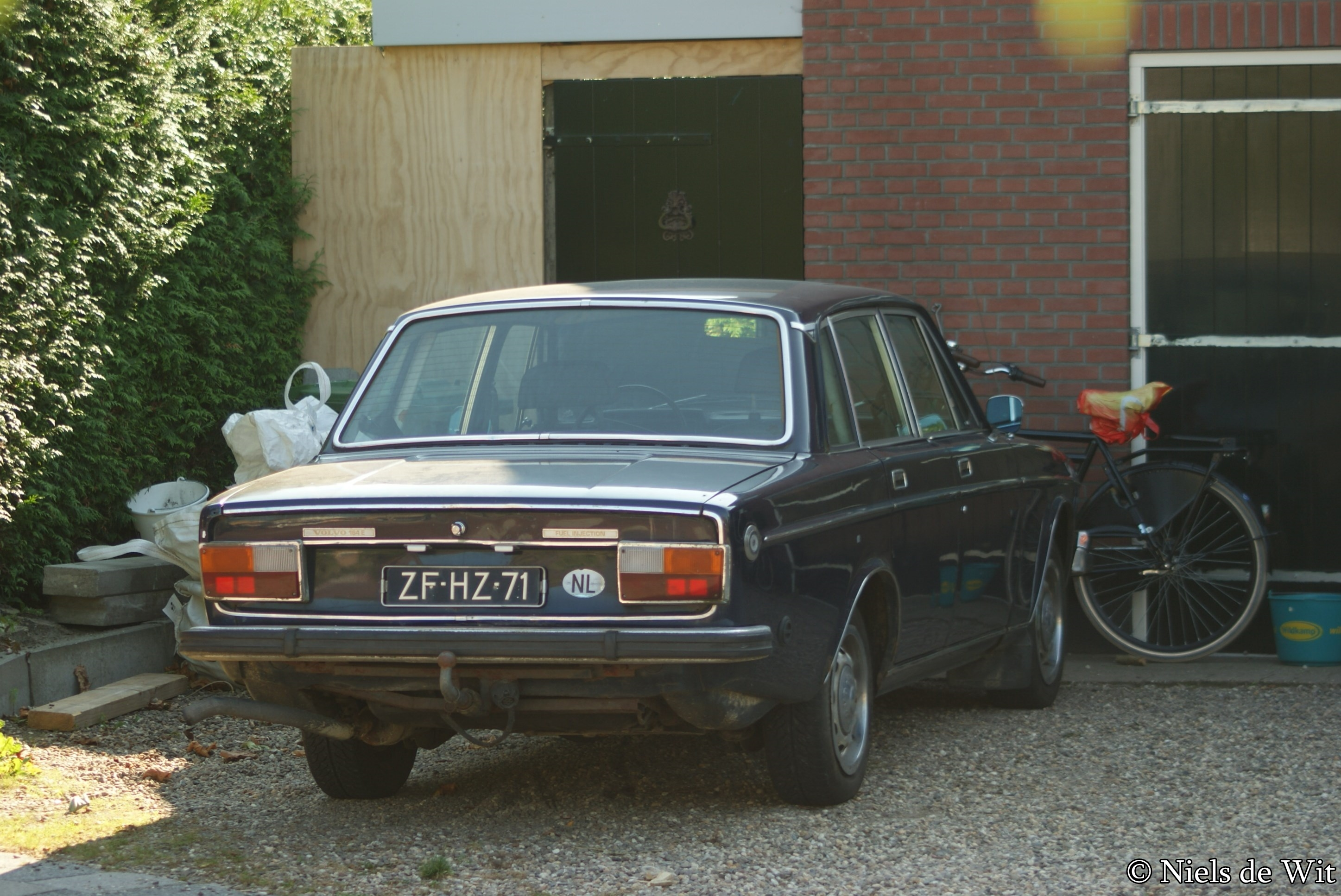
1973 164 rear illustrating facelifted tail section

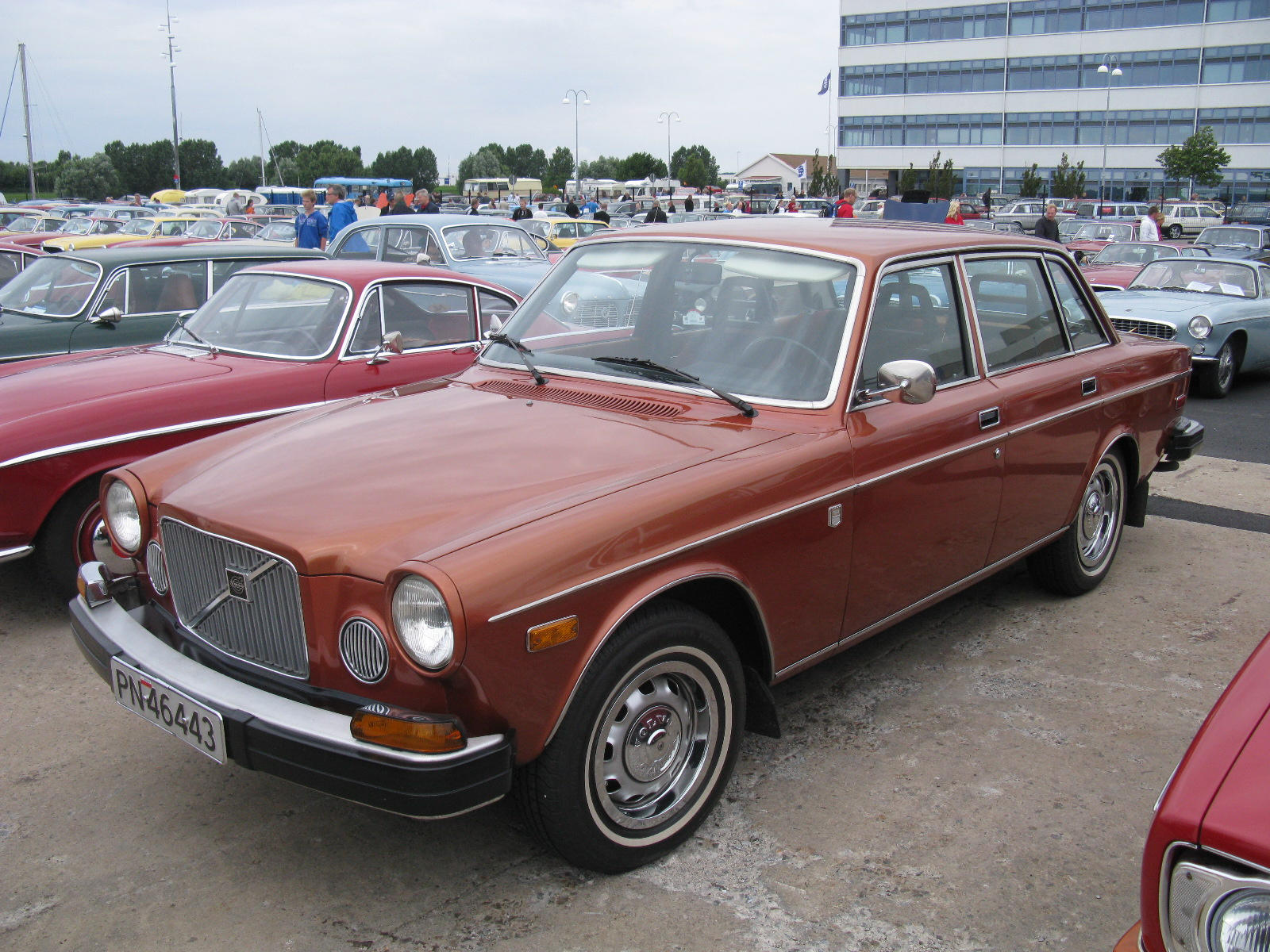
1975 164 front illustrating updated front bumper, grille and redesigned doors.

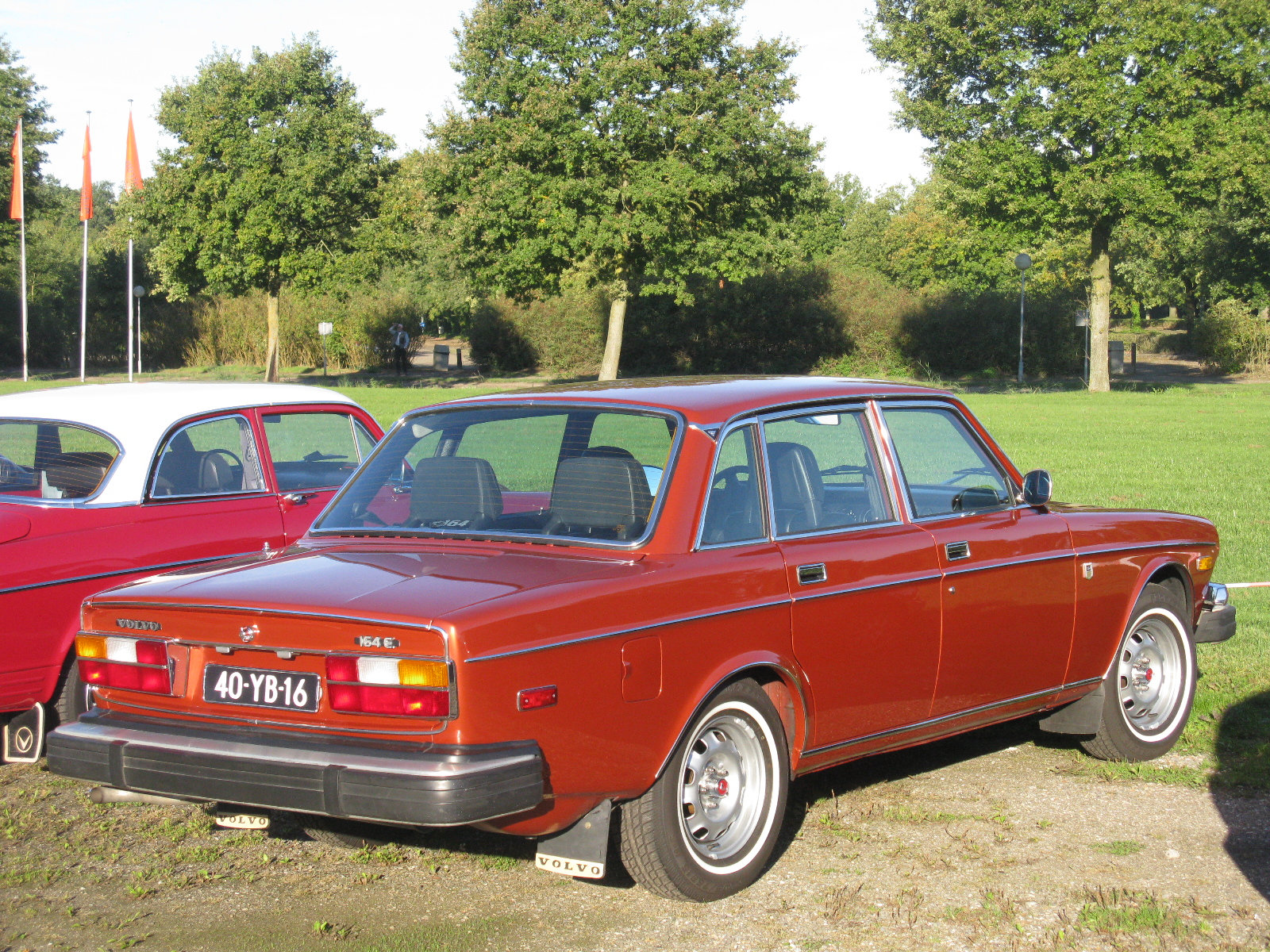
1975 164 rear illustrating updated tail end including 6 panel lights and unique emblems only used on 1975 164.

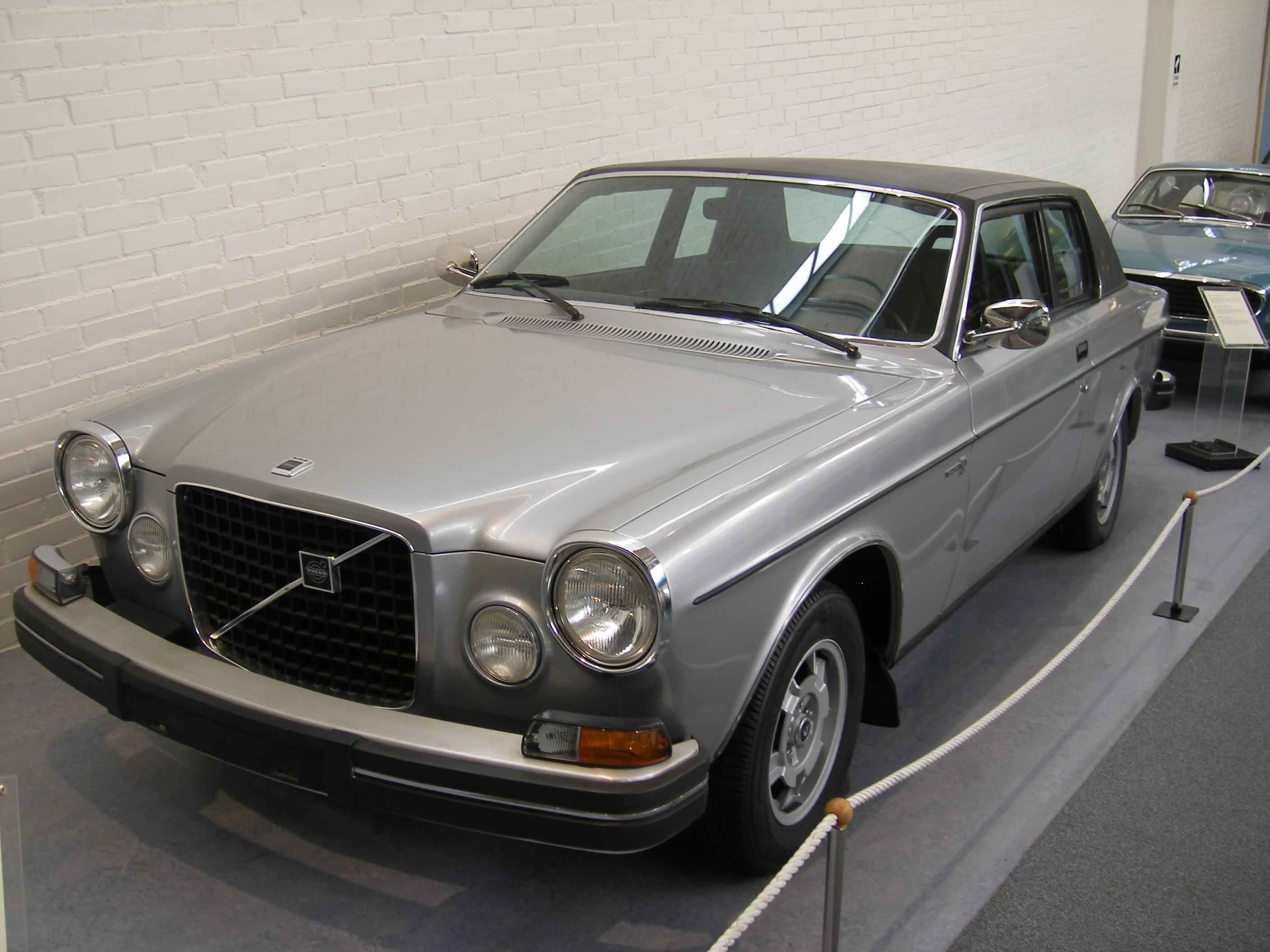
1st coupé prototype, utilising 164 front.

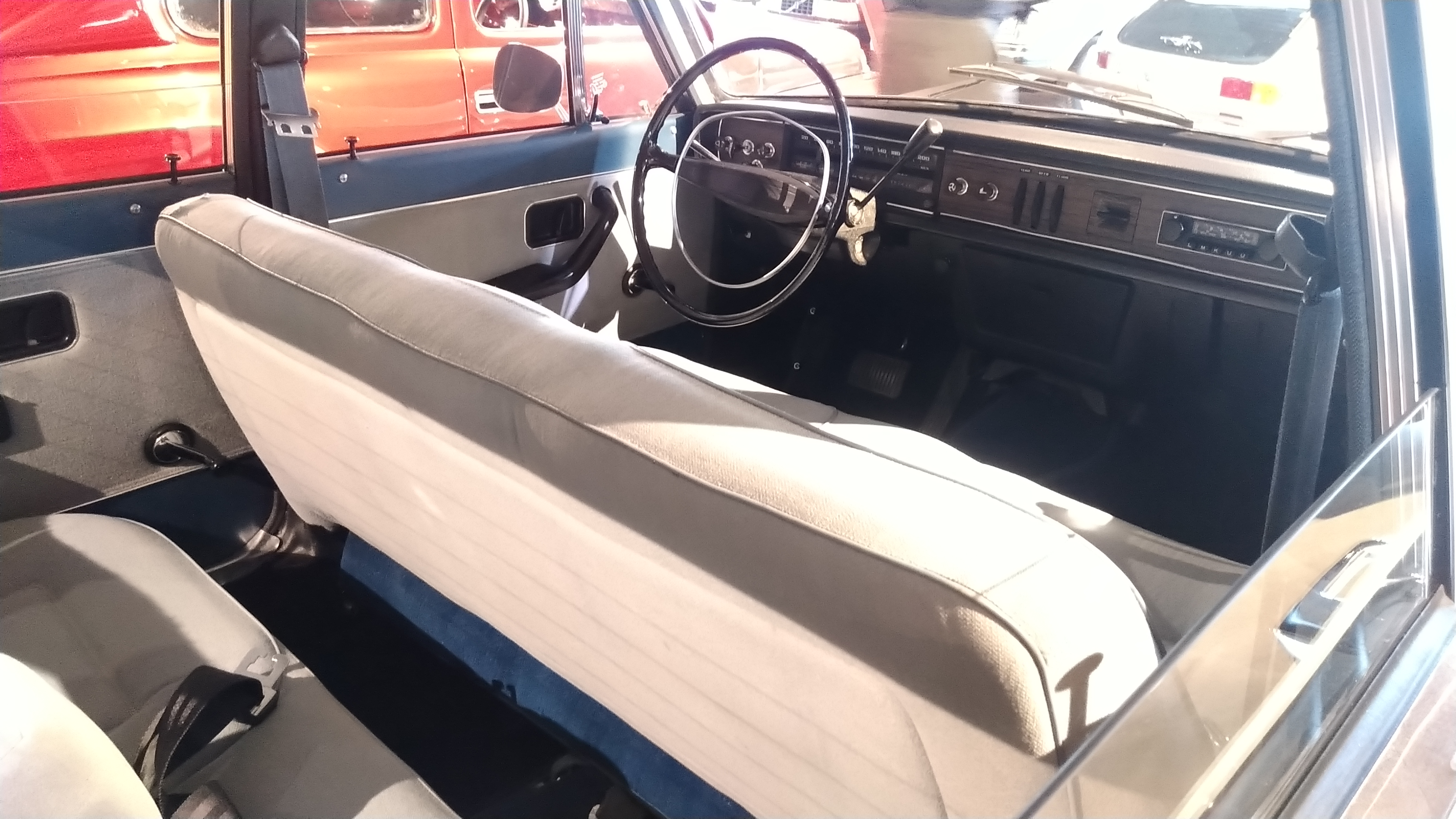
Front bench seat in a 1969 Volvo 164

== See also ==
- Volvo 140 Series
- Volvo 200 Series
