= Jan Wilsgaard =

Scandinavian car designer (1930–2016)

- Born: 23 January 1930; Brooklyn
- Died: 6 August 2016 (aged 86)
- Education: School of Design and Crafts
- Occupation: Car designer
- Employer: Volvo

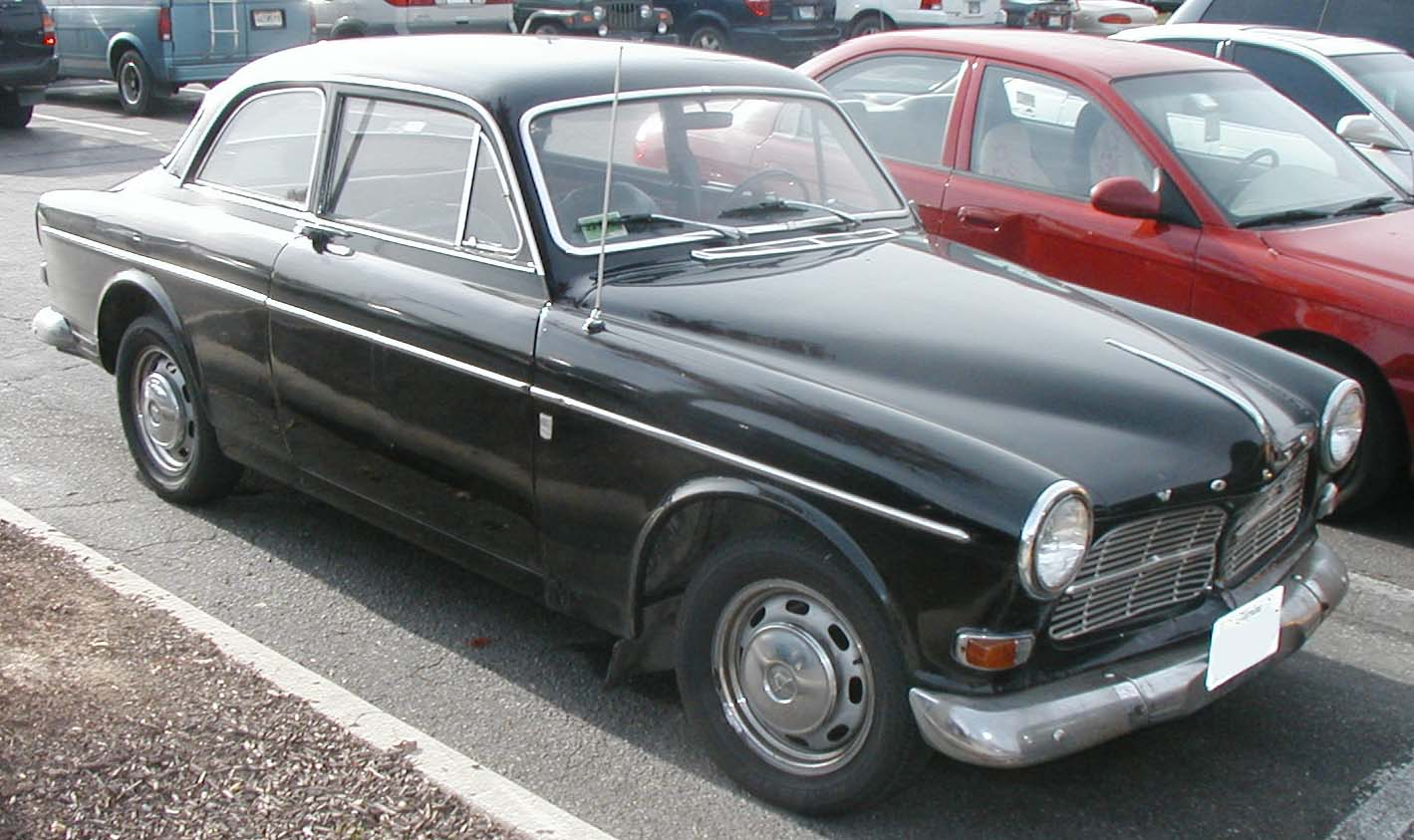
1966 Volvo 122 coupe designed by Wilsgaard

Jan Wilsgaard (23 January 1930 – 6 August 2016) was an American-born Norwegian automotive designer. He was the head of design at Volvo Cars from 1950 to 1990.

Wilsgaard was one of twenty-five designers nominated for Car Designer of the Century.

== Background and career ==
Wilsgaard studied at the Gothenburg School of Applied Arts (now HDK, Högskolan för Design och Konsthantverk, at the University of Gothenburg) before joining Volvo when co-founder Assar Gabrielsson still headed the company.

As Chief Designer, Wilsgaard designed all Volvo's projects during his tenure, with few exceptions (e.g., the Volvo P1900 Sport and P1800 Coupe). One of Wilsgaard's first jobs was to design better rear windows for the PV Duett Van, a prophetic project, given that Wilsgaard went on to design the estate versions of the company's Amazon, 145, 245, 760 and 850 Series — during a period which saw Volvo become closely associated with the station wagon / estate body type.

In addition to designing the Amazon, and 144, Wilsgaard also designed the highly regarded Volvo 164, as well as his successful estate adaptation, the 1800ES, of the company's P1800 Coupe. According to Simon Lamarre, chief studio designer, "the 1800ES has become one of the icons for Volvo", inspiring the design of the Volvo 480 and the Volvo C30.

When he designed the Volvo 140 Series, Wilsgaard employed a credo, "simple is beautiful". The design symbolized the car's robust, restrained quality. Regarding the enormous success of the Volvo 240 series in worldwide, Wilsgaard is said to have remarked "It might be because the car is a little square and sluggish, just like the Swedes themselves." He was followed at Volvo by the British designer Peter Horbury.

Wilsgaard died on 6 August 2016.

=== Volvo cars styled by Jan Wilsgaard ===
- P179, better known as the "Margaret Rose"
- Volvo Philip (1950)
- PV 179 (1952)
- Volvo Amazon (P1200/120)
- Volvo P1400 (1967)(Volvo 140)
- Volvo 164
- Volvo 140
- Volvo 240
- Volvo 262C
- Volvo 740
- Volvo 760
- Volvo 780
- Volvo 850

== Personal life ==
Wilsgaard was born in Brooklyn, New York in 1930, to a Norwegian mother and father. His father was a Norwegian sailor. During World War II, his family fled from Norway to Sweden. Wilsgaard died on 6 August 2016.

== Gallery ==
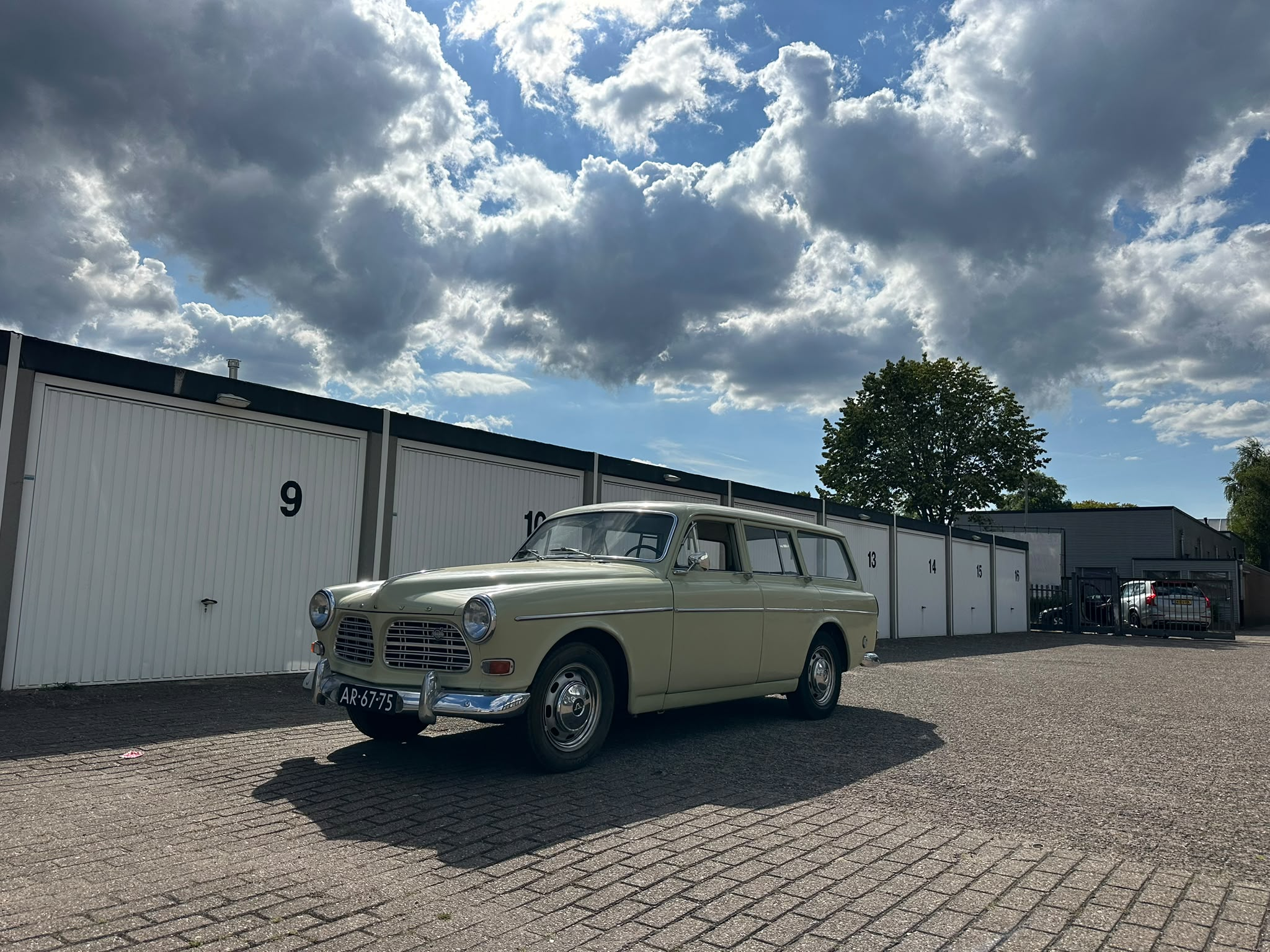
Volvo Amazon Kombi (the 120 Series was produced from 1956–1970)

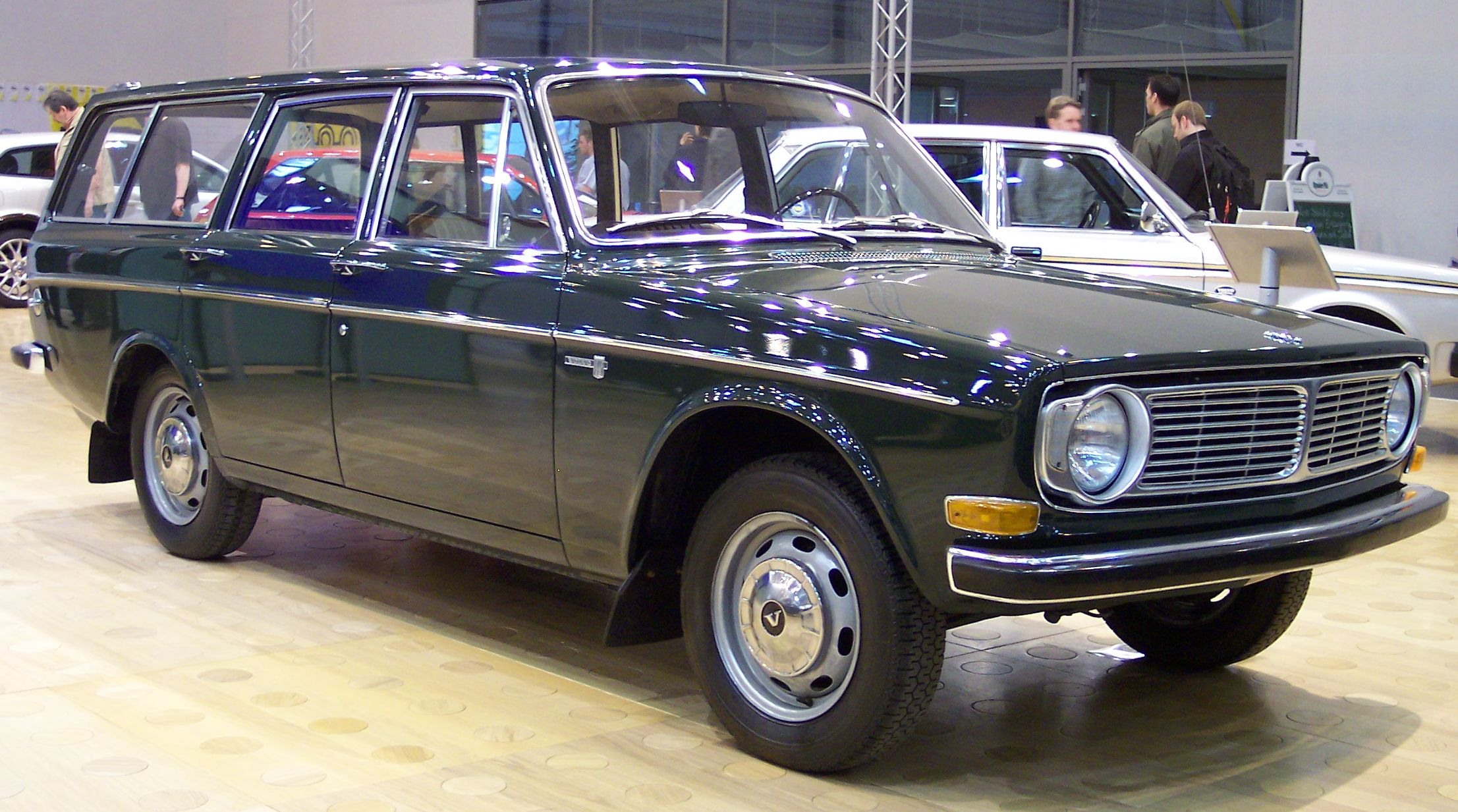
Volvo 145 (the 140 Series was produced from 1966–1974)

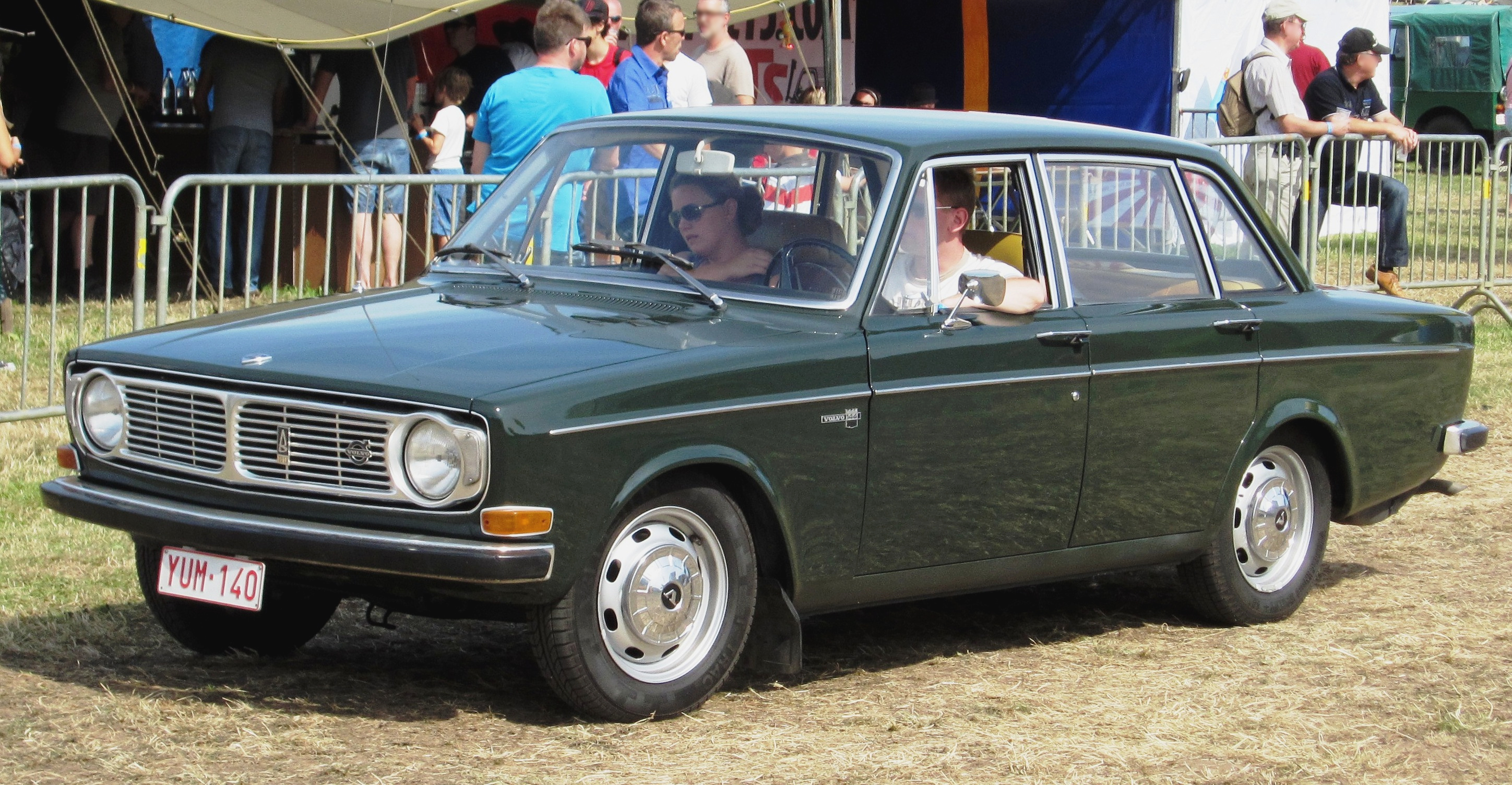
Volvo 144

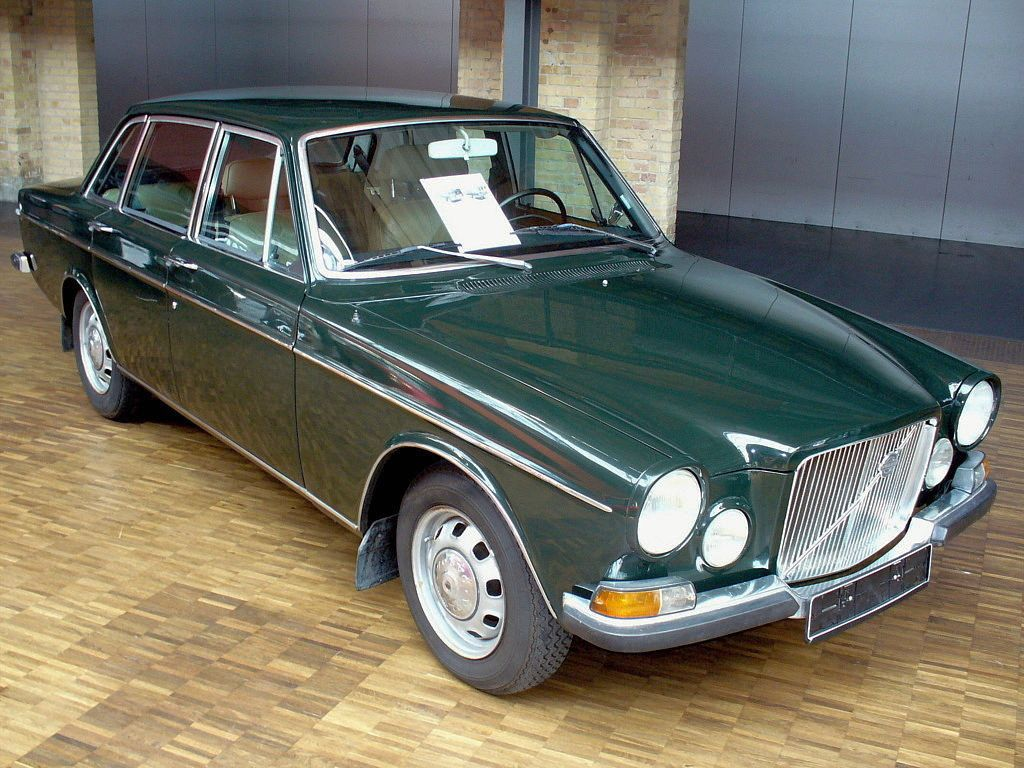
Volvo 164 (1968–1975)

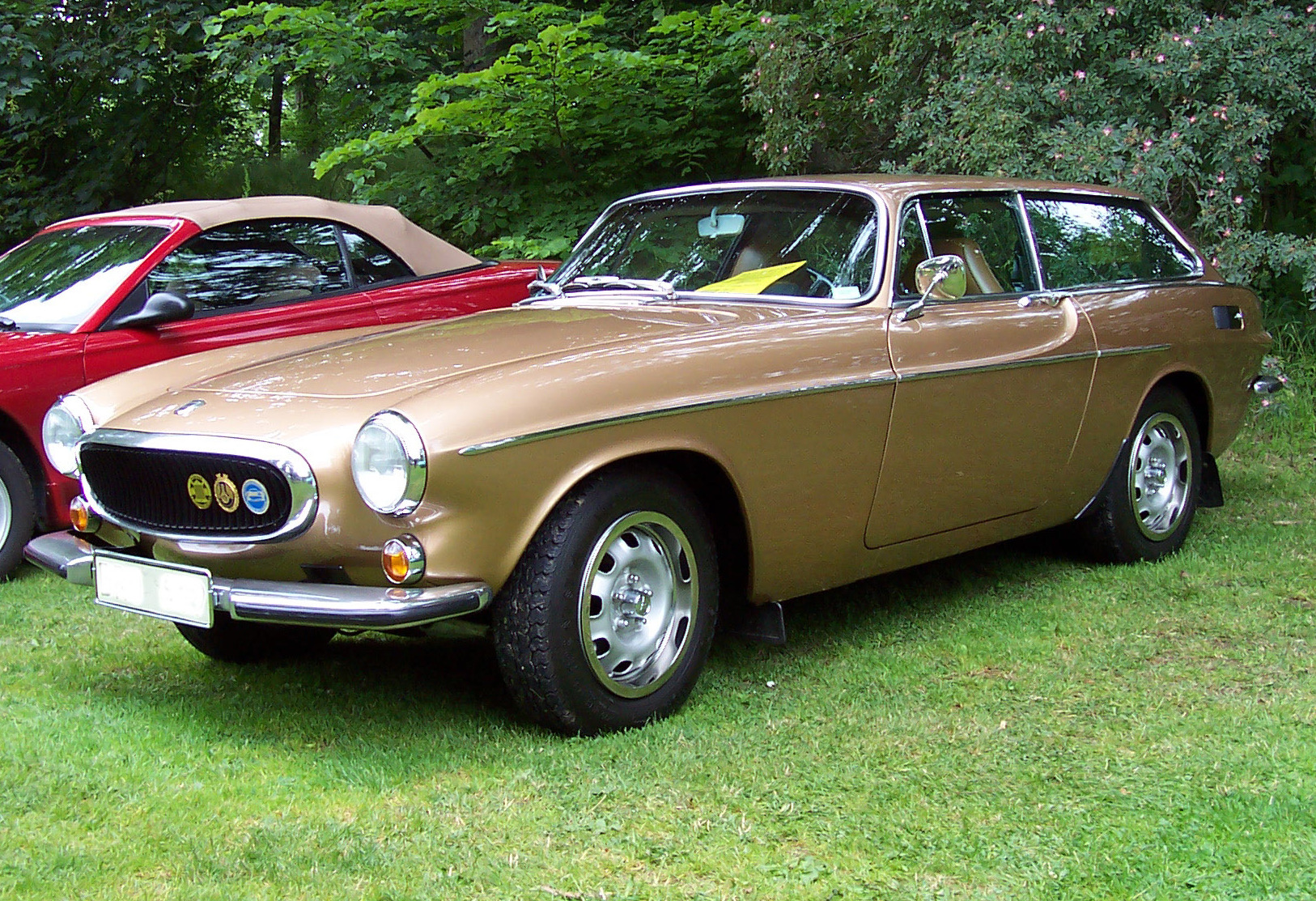
The Volvo 1800ES estate version was designed by Wilsgaard

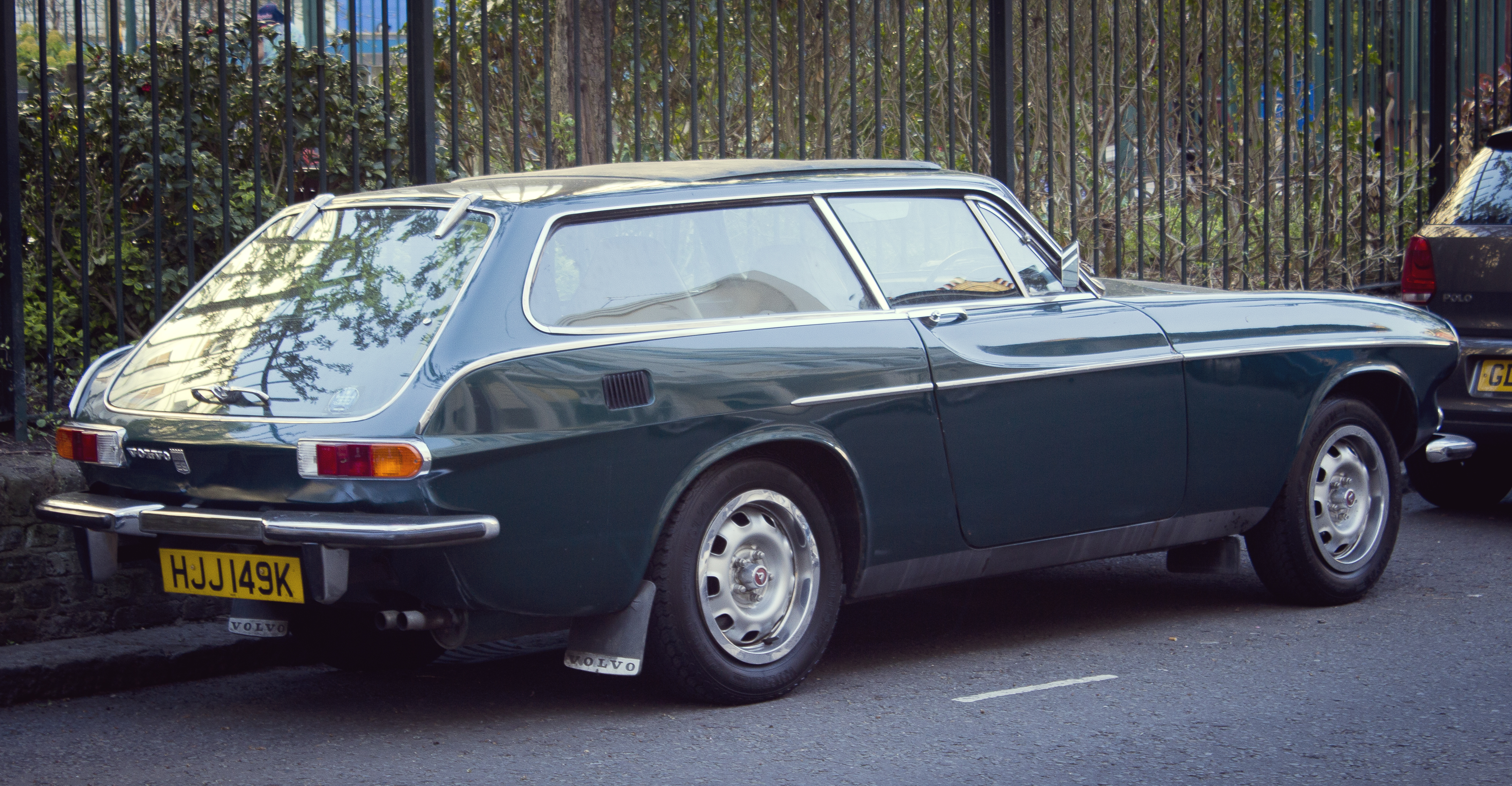
Rear view of the Volvo 1800ES, as adapted by Wilsgaard

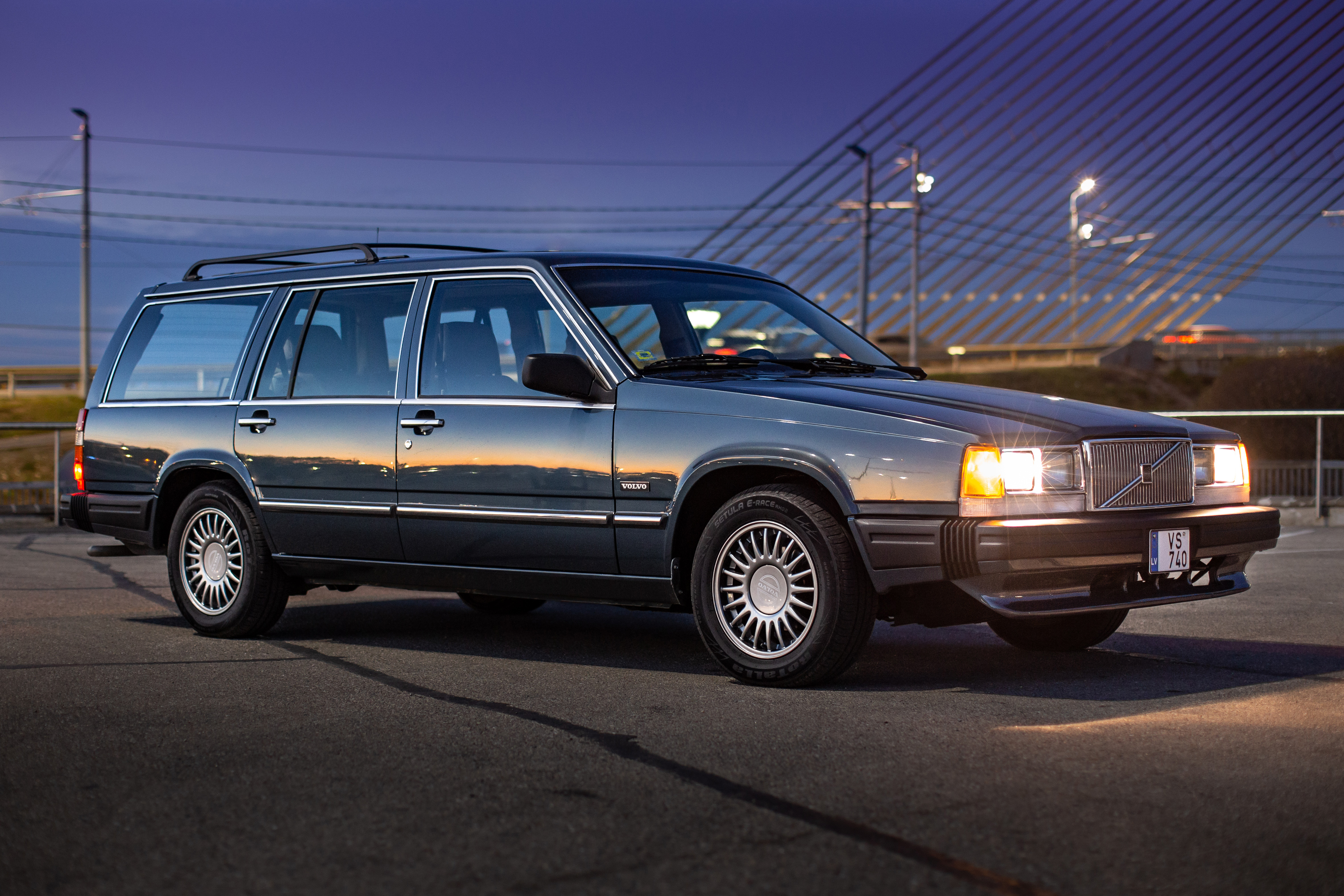
Volvo 740 (1984–1992)

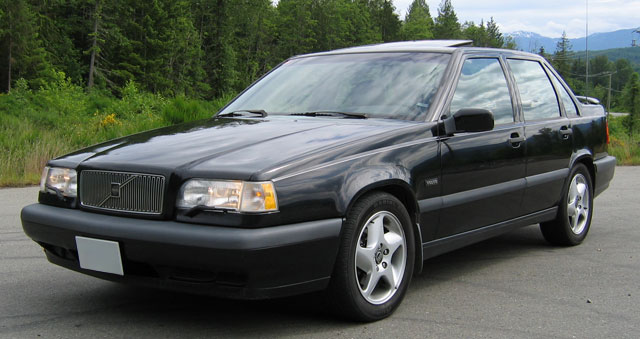
The 850 (1991–1997) was Wilsgaard's last design for Volvo

== See also ==
- Volvo Cars
- Peter Horbury
