= Volvo Duett =

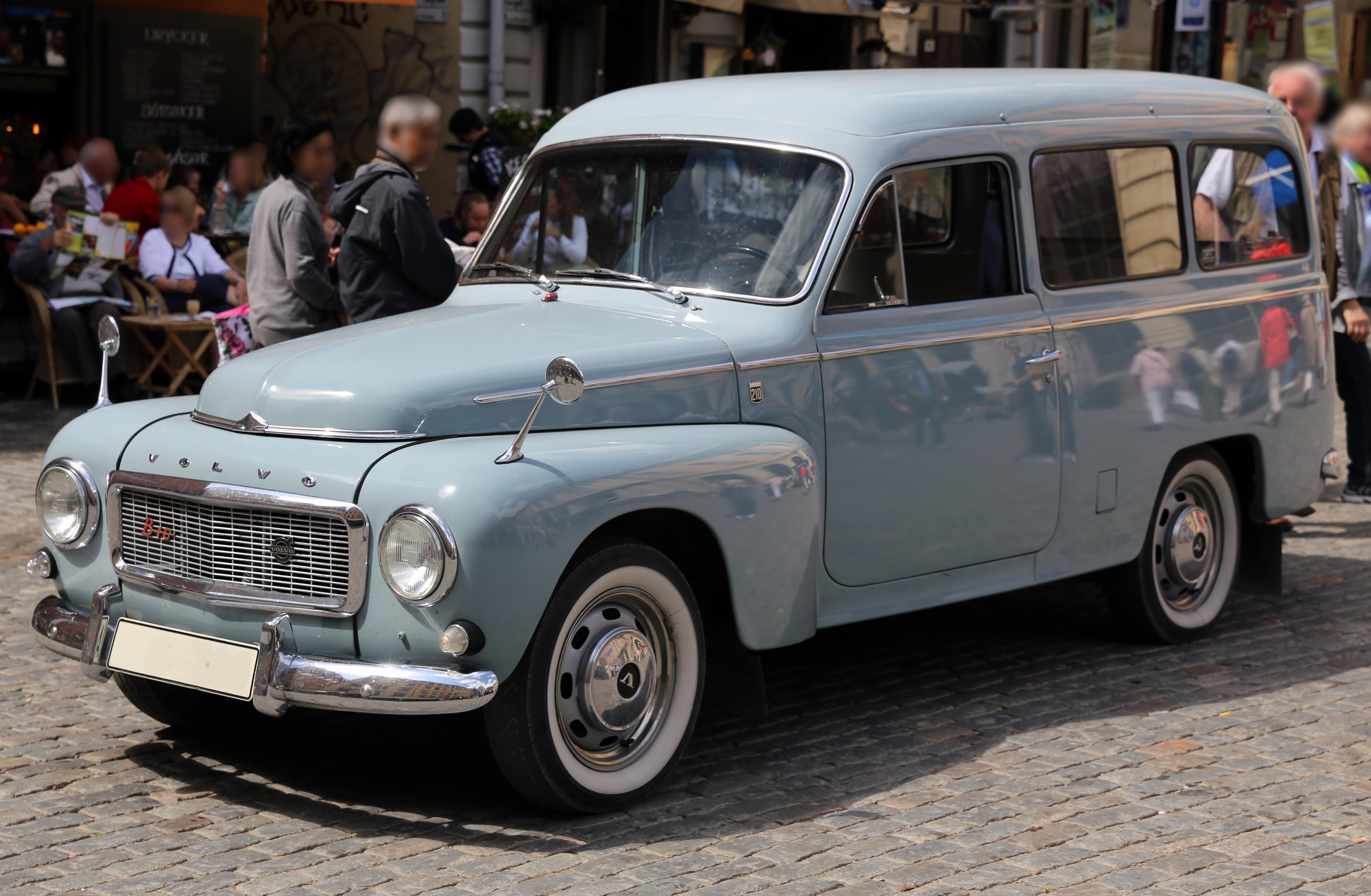

Overview
- Manufacturer: Volvo Personvagnar
- Production: 1953–1969
- Assembly: Sweden: Lundby, Gothenburg; Sweden: Torslanda (Torslandaverken); Brazil: Rio de Janeiro (Carbrasa)
- Designer: Erik Skoog

Body and chassis
- Body style: estate; panel van
- Layout: FR layout
- Related: Volvo PV444/544; Volvo Amazon Estate/P220

Powertrain
- Engine: 1.8 L B18A I4
- Transmission: 4-speed M40 manual

Dimensions
- Wheelbase: 2,600 mm (102.4 in)
- Length: 4,400 mm (173.2 in)
- Width: 1,600 mm (63.0 in)
- Height: 1,700 mm (66.9 in)

Chronology
- Successor: Volvo 145 Express

The Volvo Duett is an automobile from Volvo that was in production from 1953 until 1969.

The name Duett was intended to signify a car that could be used as a delivery vehicle during the week and as a comfortable sedan away from work.

The Duett was produced in three body styles: an estate car (or station wagon), a panel van, and, in small numbers, a bare chassis with no body from the windshield rearward.

== Ladder frame design ==
The design is based on the Volvo PV sedan and shares its engine and front suspension with that model. However, unlike the PV, which had a unibody design and a coil spring rear suspension, the Duett used a ladder frame with leaf springs supporting the rear.

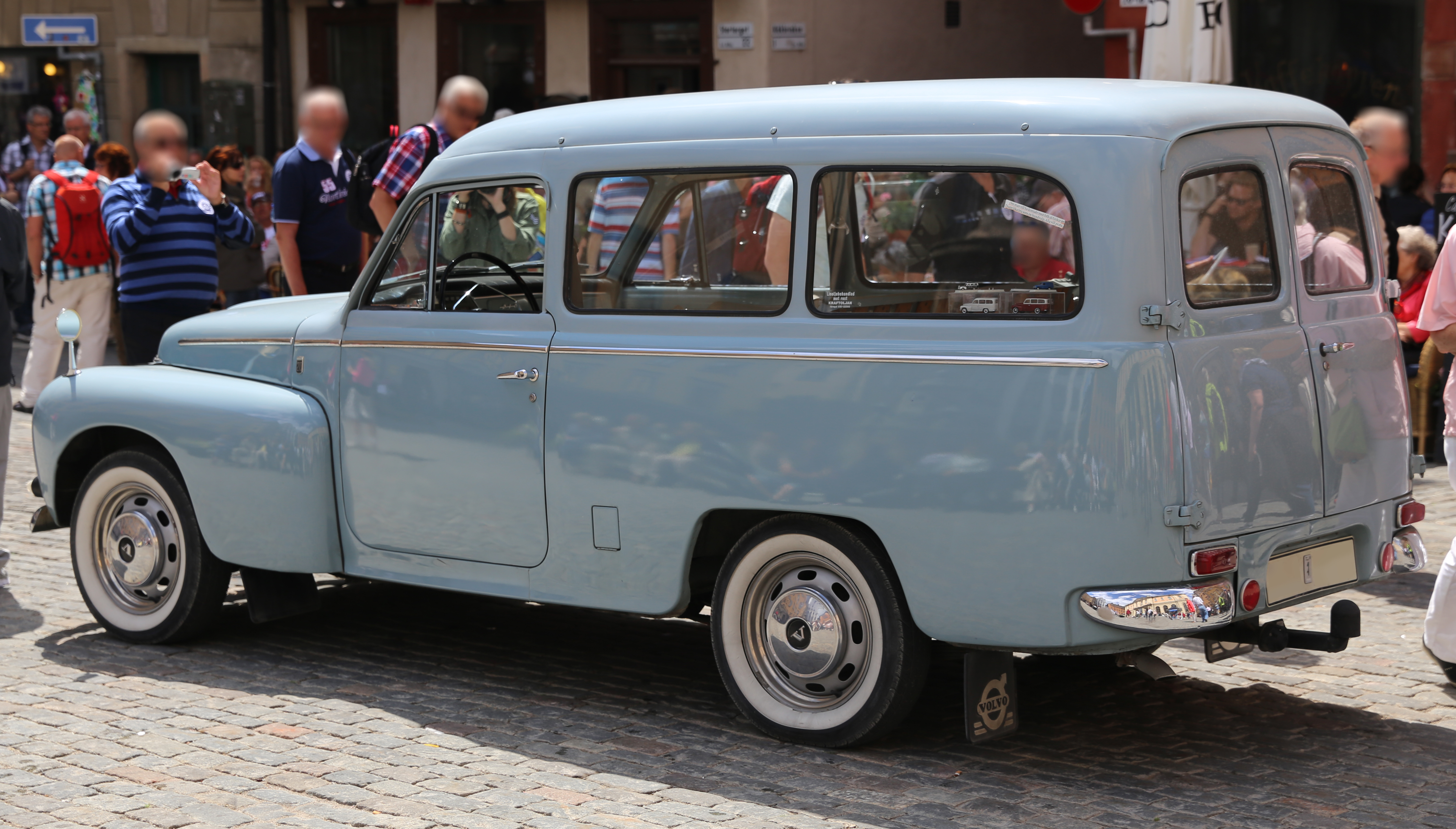
A 1965 Volvo Duett (21134E)

While the Duett has been criticised as a regressive design by those who point out that the ladder-frame car was based on Volvo's first unibodied car; the use of a separate ladder chassis provided Volvo with an easy solution in their desire to produce a suitable commercial vehicle. The availability of the bare chassis also allowed Swedish coach builders such as Grip, Valbo and Nordbergs to build Duett-based pickup trucks, convertibles and specialised commercial vehicles. The versatility of the ladder-frame design also made the Duett a popular choice as a base for customised vehicles such as hot rods and A-tractor.

The Duett was the only automobile marketed by Volvo in the United States that used a separate frame. All other models were of unibody construction.

== Model designations ==
=== PV445 ===
The PV445's bodywork was based on the PV444 saloon car and shared its two-piece flat paned windshield.

=== P210 ===
The P210 replaced the P445 in the fall of 1960. It is most easily distinguishable from the PV445 by its use of a single-piece curved windshield, which it shares with the PV544.

== Demise and replacement ==
The final P210 rolled off the line in 1969, four years after the end of production of the PV544 on which it was based. The Duett was replaced by the Volvo 145 Express, a more modern design by Jan Wilsgaard which is an evolutionary advancement from his earlier work on the platform of the Volvo Amazon and it is unrelated to the Duett in terms of its engineering.

== Gallery ==
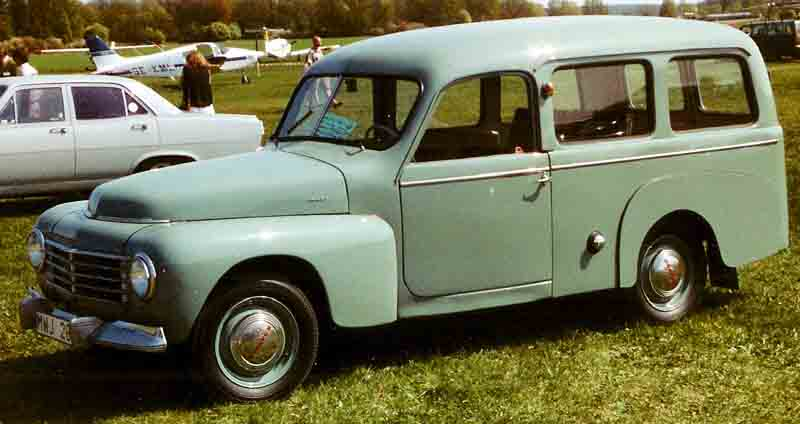
Volvo PV445 with bodywork by another builder

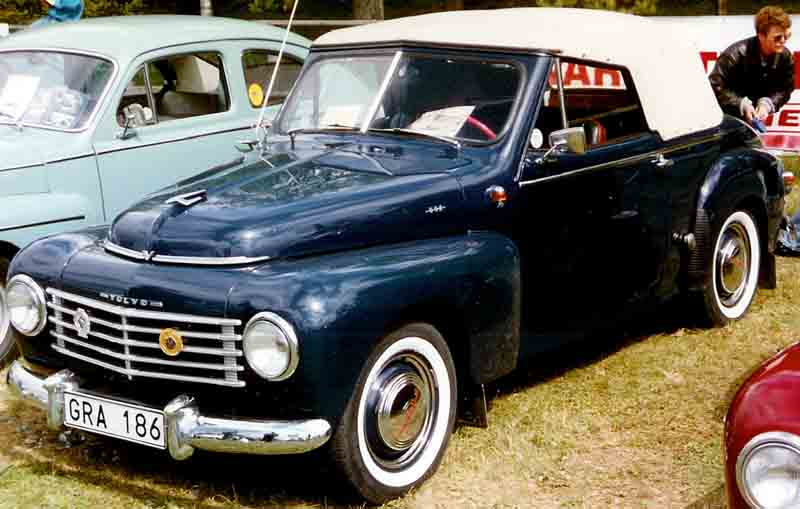
Volvo PV445 Cabriolet 1952

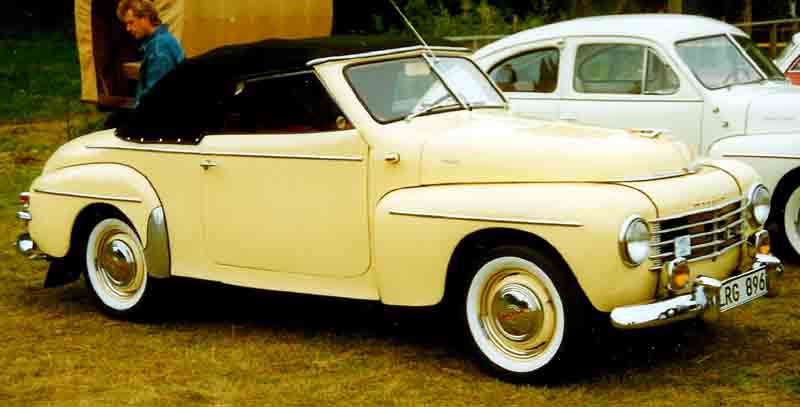
Volvo PV445 Cabriolet 1953

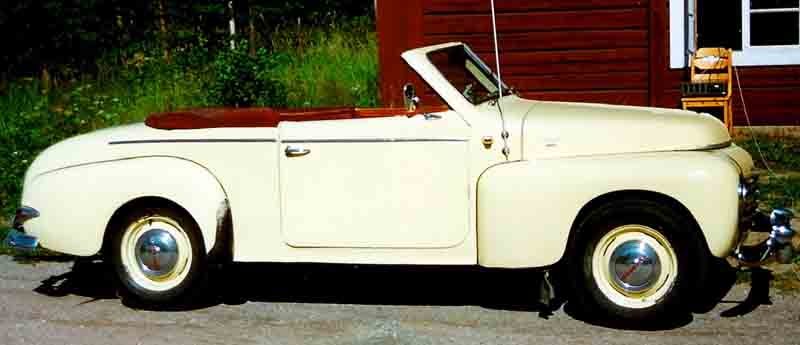
Volvo PV445 Cabriolet

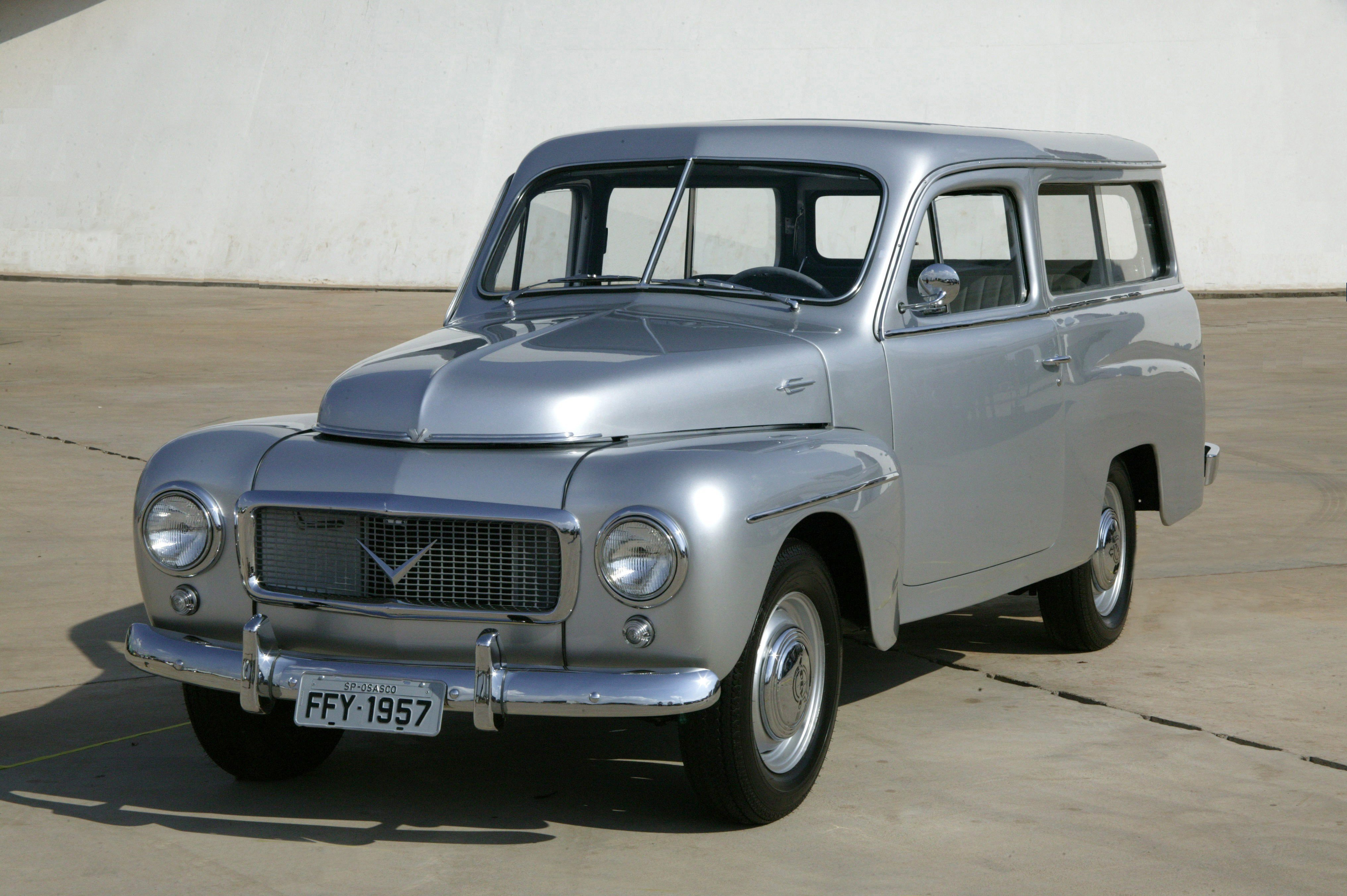
Brazilian-assembled 1957 Volvo PV445 by Carbrasa

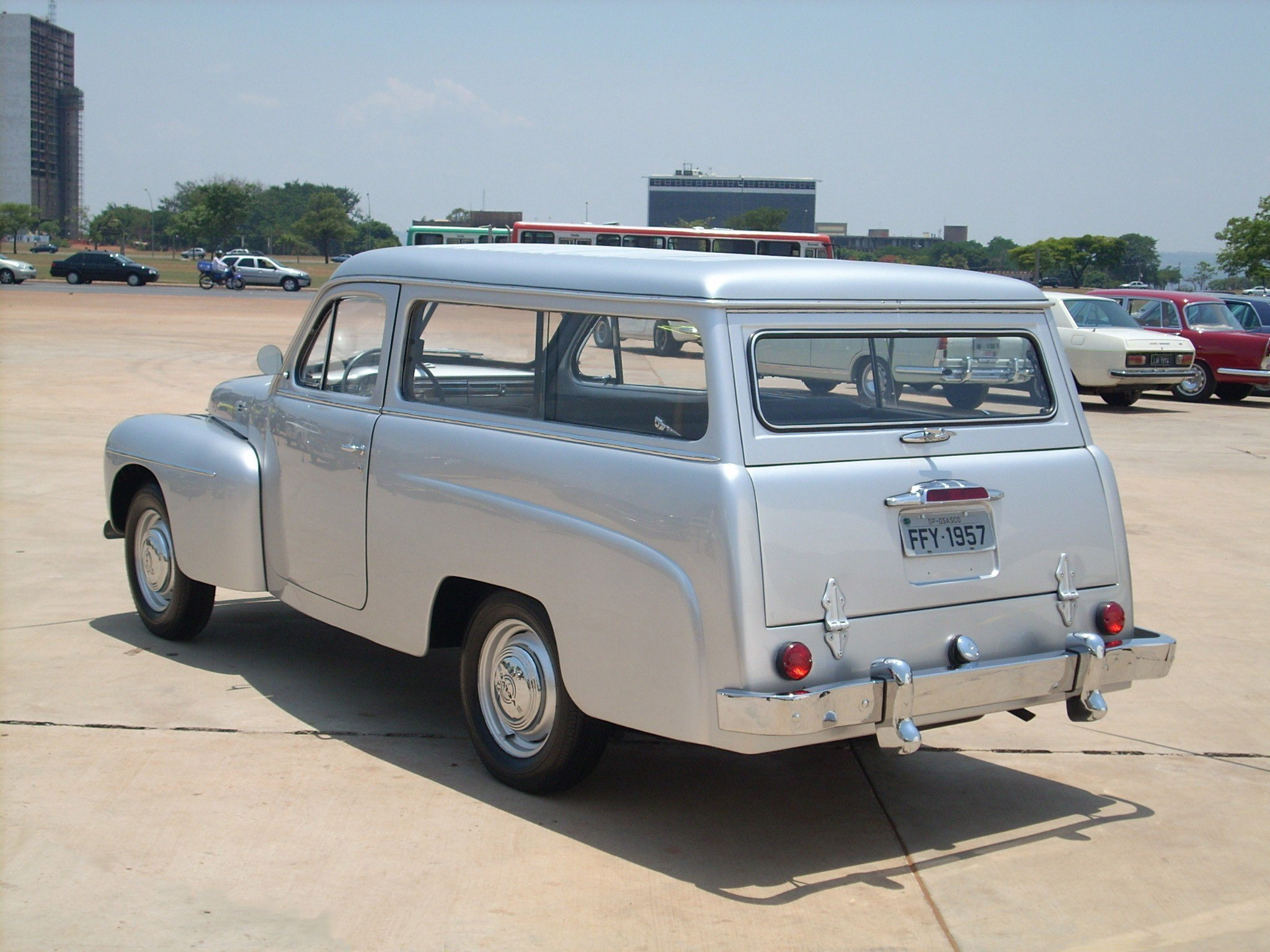
Rear view of Carbrasa-assembled Volvo PV445

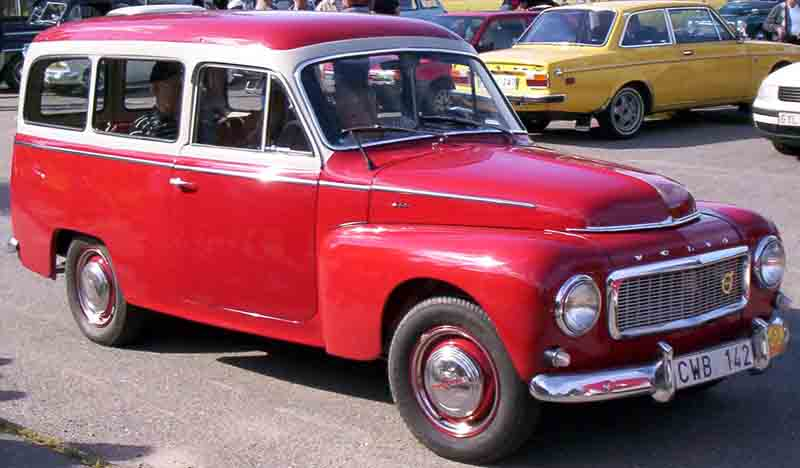
Volvo 21134 A Duett 1960

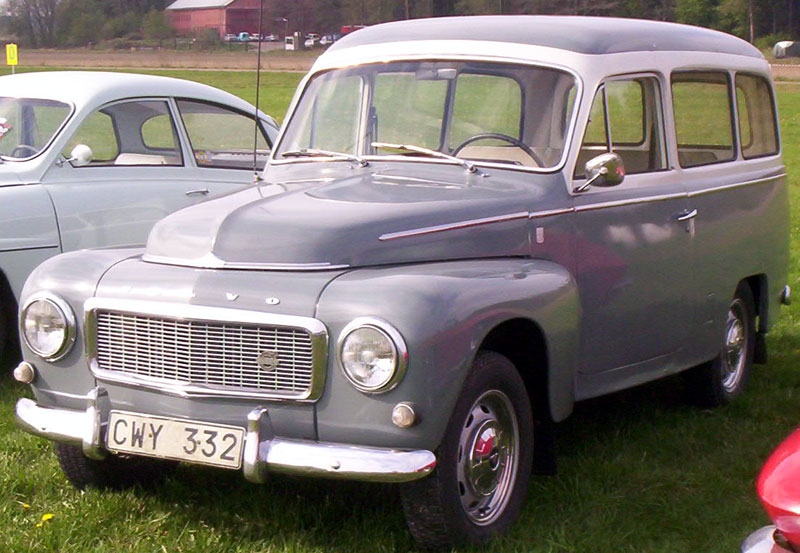
Volvo 21134 F 1966

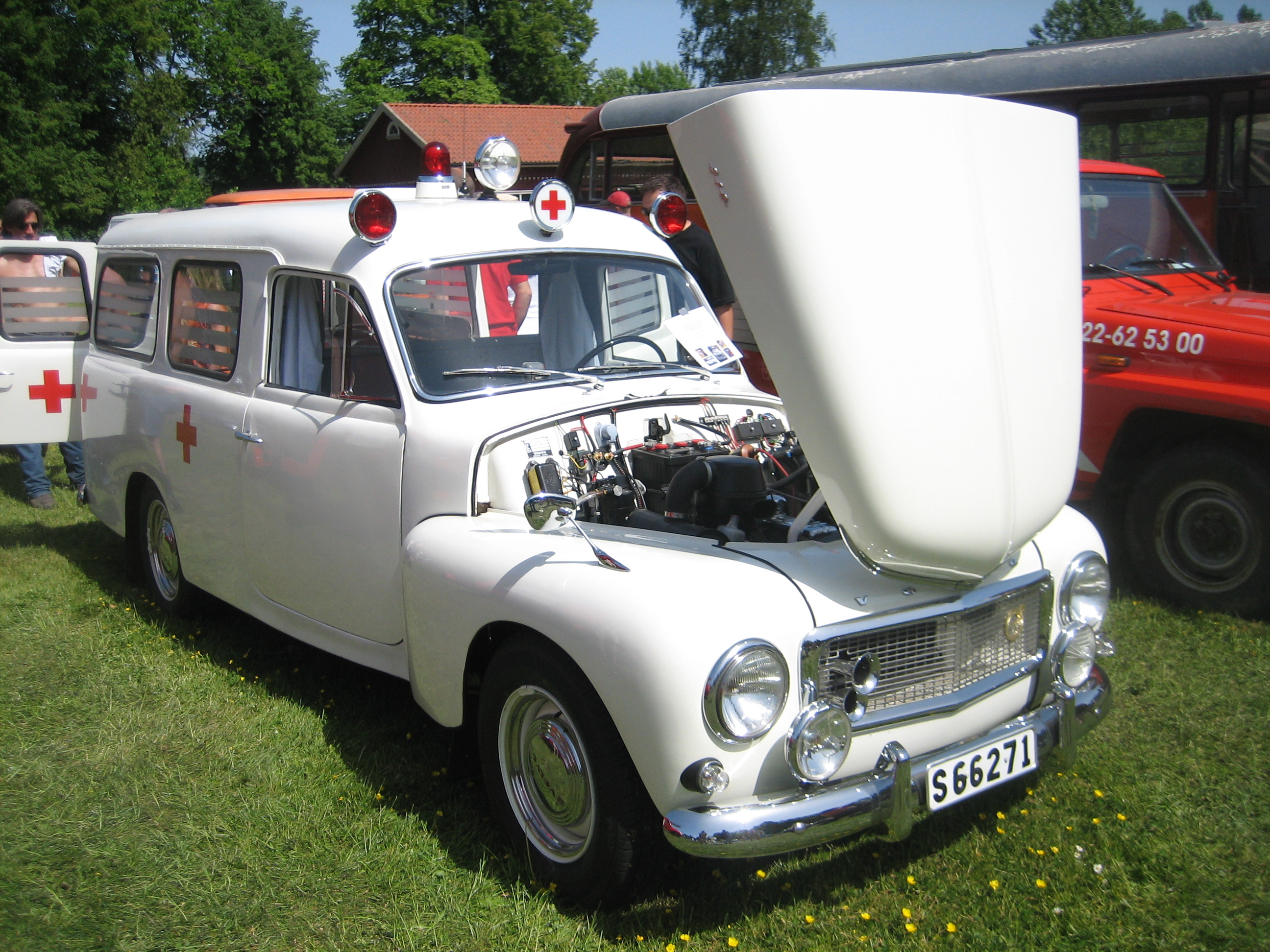
Volvo Duett ambulance
