= List of Volvo Trucks engines =

Volvo Trucks has produced various engines since the late 1920s. In the 2010s, the company also began using engines developed by German motor manufacturer Deutz AG. Volvo was among the first to use turbodiesel engines in commercially successful trucks.

== B36 ==
The Volvo B36 is a four-stroke, cast-iron, 90-degree petrol V8 engine introduced in 1952. It produces 120 PS (88 kW) at 4,000 rpm and 260 N⋅m (192 lb⋅ft) of torque at 2,200 rpm. The engine has a displacement of 3.56 liters and weighs 235 kg (518 lb). A two-port Carter carburetor and intake are positioned between the cylinder banks. The crossflow cylinder heads are made from a cast iron alloy, and the five-bearing camshaft is constructed from a case-hardened steel alloy. Although the engine is often described as a twinned Volvo B18 four-cylinder, only some components of the valve train are interchangeable between the two engines.

The B36 engine was utilized in the Volvo L420 Snabbe truck, among other vehicles. It was originally developed for a planned luxury automobile named Volvo Philip in the early 1950s. Following the cancellation of the Volvo Philip project, the engine was installed in a truck instead. Due to high fuel consumption, diesel engines soon became available in this range of trucks. The B36 was discontinued in 1973, although it was no longer used in trucks after 1966. It was the last petrol truck engine built by Volvo and the only V8 engine used in any vehicle, except for the newer Yamaha-built units used in the Volvo XC90 and S80.

A marine version, the Volvo Penta AQ180, was available, featuring 180 hp with twin carburetors.

== D36 ==
Volvo originally lacked the resources to develop its own diesel engines. To address this, Volvo began using the 3,610 cc 4D "Dorset" OHV diesel inline-four engine built by Ford for their Fordson Major tractor in 1963. This engine, known as the D36, produced 65 PS (48 kW). It was installed in the Volvo 425 (Snabbe) and 435 (Trygge) models until 1966, when it was replaced by a more powerful Perkins unit.

== D39 ==
In late 1966, Volvo began using a 3,865 cc OHV diesel inline-four engine from Perkins (Perkins 4.236) in the F82 and F83 models, renamed versions of the "Snabbe" and "Trygge." This engine, labeled D39 by Volvo, produces 80 PS (59 kW). It was eventually replaced by Volvo's own range of diesel engines.

Engine D6B
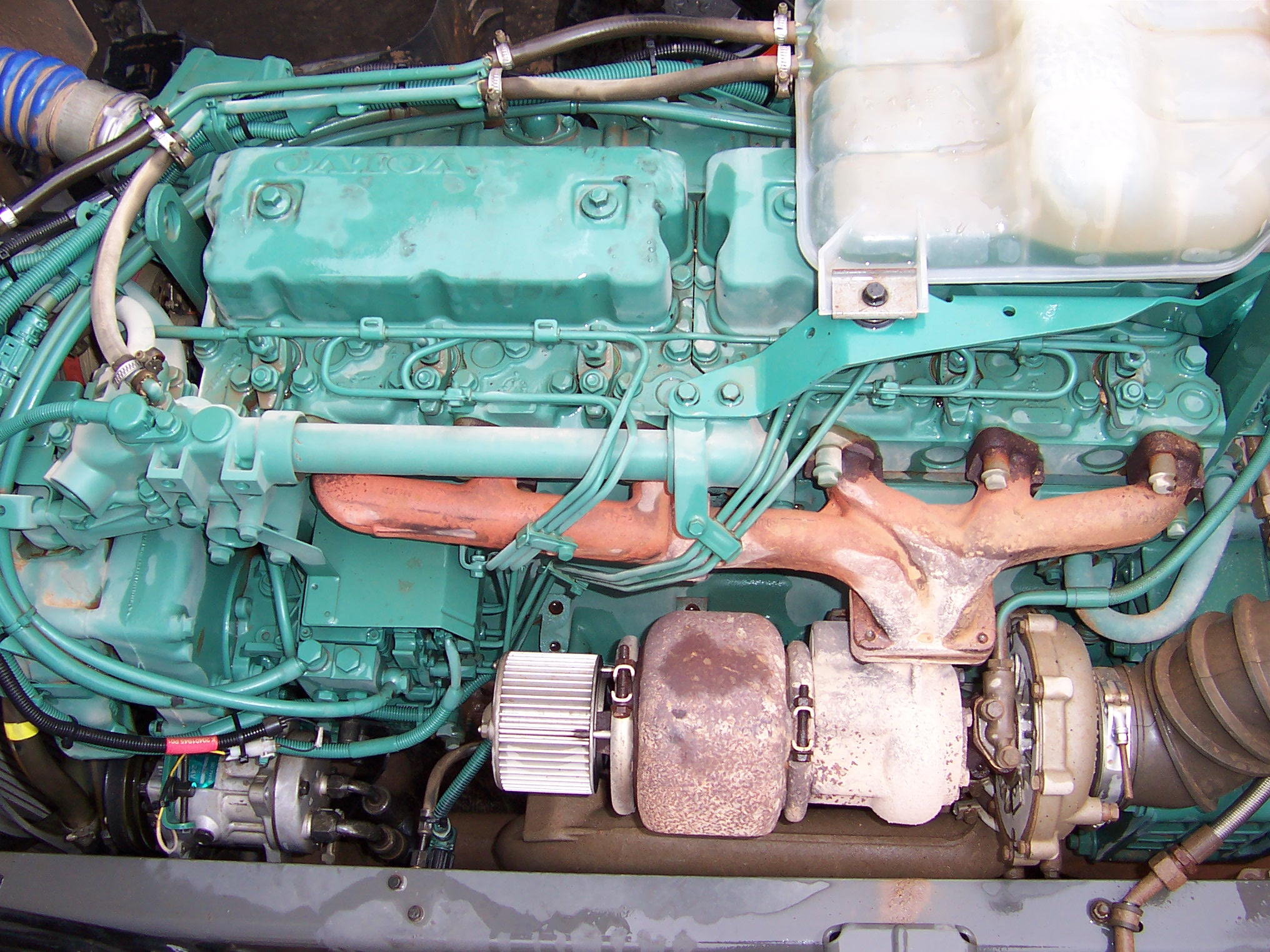

Overview
- Manufacturer: Volvo

Layout
- Configuration: Inline 6 diesel
- Displacement: 5.5 L
- Cylinder bore: 98.425 mm
- Piston stroke: 120 mm
- Cylinder block material: Cast iron
- Cylinder head material: 2x cast iron
- Valvetrain: OHV
- Compression ratio: 19:1

Combustion
- Turbocharger: Intercooled
- Fuel system: Distributor injection pump EDC
- Fuel type: Diesel
- Cooling system: Water-cooled

Output
- Power output: 180 hp - 220 hp - 250 hp (132 kW - 162 kW - 184 kW)
- Torque output: 424 ft·lbf - 516 ft·lbf - 608.5 ft·lbf (575 N·m - 700 N·m - 825 N·m)

Dimensions
- Length: 1171 mm
- Width: 605 mm
- Height: 995 mm
- Dry weight: 580 kg (dry)

Chronology
- Predecessor: D6A

Engine D7E
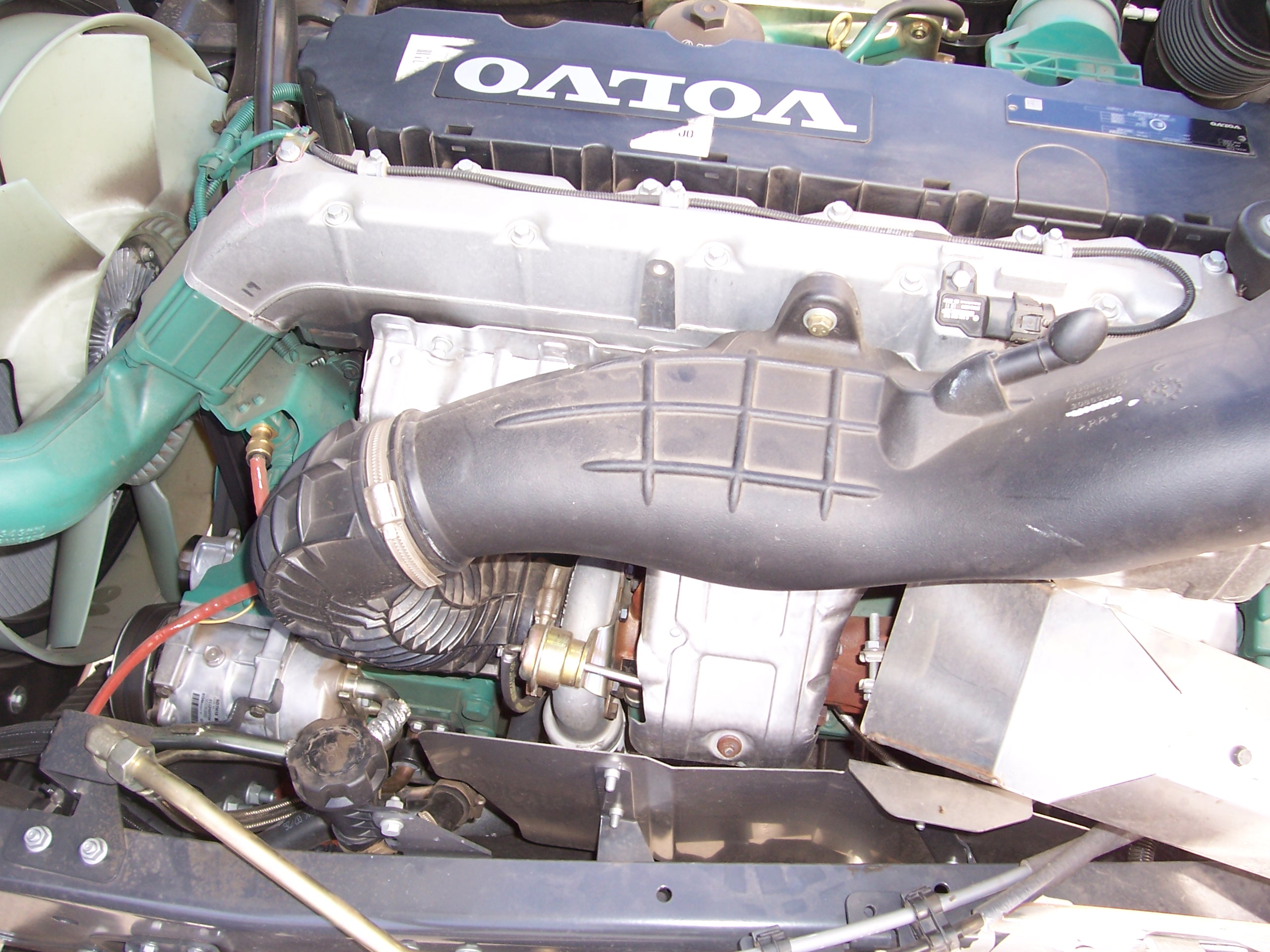

Overview
- Manufacturer: Deutz

Layout
- Configuration: Inline 6 diesel
- Displacement: 7.14 L
- Cylinder bore: 108 mm
- Piston stroke: 130 mm
- Cylinder block material: Cast iron
- Cylinder head material: 1x cast iron
- Valvetrain: OHV
- Compression ratio: 18:1

Combustion
- Turbocharger: Intercooled
- Fuel system: Common Rail
- Fuel type: Diesel
- Cooling system: Water-cooled

Output
- Power output: 240 hp - 280 hp - 320 hp (177 kW - 206 kW - 235 kW)
- Torque output: 678.5 ft·lbf - 774.4 ft·lbf - 885 ft·lbf (920 N·m - 1,050 N·m - 1,200 N·m)

Dimensions
- Length: 1,218 mm
- Width: 780 mm
- Height: 983 mm
- Dry weight: 590 kg

Chronology
- Predecessor: D7C

== D11 ==
| Model | Power | Torque | Compression Ratio | Bore | Stroke | Displacement | Year |
|---|---|---|---|---|---|---|---|
| D11A | 243-317 kW (330-430 hp) @ 1,800 rpm | 1,650-1970 Nm (1,544ft-lb) @ 1,000 rpm | 17.3:1 | 123mm (4.84 inches) | 152mm (5.98 inches) | 10,837cc (661.3CI) | |
| D11B | 287-316kW (390-430hp) @ 1,800 rpm | 1,880-2,100Nm (1,387-1,549ft-lb) @ 1,000 rpm | 17.3:1 | 123mm (4.84 inches) | 152mm (5.98 inches) | 10,837cc (661.3CI) | |
| D11C | 243-332kW (330-450hp) @ 1,800 rpm | 1,600-2,150Nm (1,180-1,586ft-lb) @ 1,000 rpm | 17.3:1 | 123mm (4.84 inches) | 152mm (5.98 inches) | 10,837cc (661.3CI) | |
| D11K | 245-339kW (330-460hp) @ 1,800 rpm | 1,600-2,200Nm (1,180-1,623ft-lb) @ 1,000 rpm | 17.3:1 | 123mm (4.84 inches) | 152mm (5.98 inches) | 10,837cc (661.3CI) | -2024 |
| D11S | 246-338kW (330-460hp) @ 1,800 rpm | 1,600-2,200Nm (1,180-1,623ft-lb) @ 1,000 rpm | 17.3:1 | 123mm (4.84 inches) | 152mm (5.98 inches) | 10,837cc (661.3CI) | 2024-present |

== D12 ==
| Model | Power | Torque | Compression Ratio | Bore | Stroke | Displacement | Year |
|---|---|---|---|---|---|---|---|
| D12A | 309kW (420hp) @ 1,800 rpm | 2,100Nm (1,544ft-lb) @ 1,000 rpm | 17.3:1 | 131.1mm (5.16 inches) | 149.9mm (5.9 inches) | 12,141cc (741CI) | 1993–1998 |
| D12C | 309-338kW (420-460hp) @ 1,800 rpm | 2,100-2,300Nm (1,544-1,691ft-lb) @ 1,000 rpm | 17.3:1 | 131.1mm (5.16 inches) | 149.9mm (5.9 inches) | 12,141cc (741CI) | 1998–2001 |
| D12D | 309-338kW (420-460hp) @ 1,800 rpm | 2,100-2,300Nm (1,544-1,691ft-lb) @ 1,000 rpm | 17.3:1 | 131.1mm (5.16 inches) | 149.9mm (5.9 inches) | 12,141cc (741CI) | 2001–2005 |
| D12F | 309-338kW (420-460hp) @ 1,800 rpm | 2,100-2,300Nm (1,544-1,691ft-lb) @ 1,000 rpm | 17.3:1 | 131.1mm (5.16 inches) | 149.9mm (5.9 inches) | 12,141cc (741CI) | 2004–2006 |

== D13 ==
The Volvo D13 engine features 14 different power ratings, ranging from 375 to 515 horsepower (export configuration). A new variable geometry turbocharger enhances throttle response while improving fuel economy. In North America, Volvo offers two XE integrated drivetrain ratings, as well as six Eco-Torque and three Dual-Torque ratings, allowing customers to match engine performance to specific application requirements.

| Model | Power | Torque | Compression Ratio | Bore | Stroke | Displacement | Year |
|---|---|---|---|---|---|---|---|
| D13A | 276-384kW (375-540hp) @ 1,500 rpm | 1,875-2,400Nm (1,379-1,765ft-lb) @ 1,050 rpm | 18:1 | 131mm (5.16 inches) | 158mm (6.22 inches) | 12,777cc (779.7CI) | 2005-present |
| D13B | 276-384kW (375-540hp) @ 1,500 rpm | 1,875-2,400Nm (1,379-1,765ft-lb) @ 1,050 rpm | 18:1 | 131mm (5.16 inches) | 158mm (6.22 inches) | 12,777cc (779.7CI) | 2005-present |
| D13C | 276-384kW (375-540hp) @ 1,500 rpm | 1,875-2,600Nm(1,379-1,918ft-lb) @ 1,000 rpm | 17.8:1 | 131mm (5.16 inches) | 158mm (6.22 inches) | 12,777cc (779.7CI) | 2005-present |
| D13K | 276-384kW (375-540hp) @ 1,500 rpm | 1,875-2,600Nm(1,379-1,918ft-lb) @ 860-1,000 rpm | 18:1 | 131mm (5.16 inches) | 158mm (6.22 inches) | 12,777cc (779.7CI) | 2012-2024 |
| D13S | 276-384kW (375-540hp) @ 1,500 rpm | 1,875-2,600Nm(1,379-1,918ft-lb) @ 860-1,000 rpm | 18:1 | 131mm (5.16 inches) | 158mm (6.22 inches) | 12,777cc (779.7CI) | 2024-present |

== D16 ==
| Model | Power | Torque | Compression Ratio | Bore | Stroke | Displacement | Year |
|---|---|---|---|---|---|---|---|
| D16A | 350-388kW (470-520hp) @ 1,800 rpm | 2,160-2,400Nm (1,379-1,765ft-lb) @ 1,000 rpm | 17.5:1(D16B), 18:1(D16A) | 144mm (5.67 inches) | 165mm (6.50 inches) | 16,123cc (984CI) | 1993-2006 |
| D16B | 350-388kW (470-520hp) @ 1,800 rpm | 2,160-2,400Nm (1,379-1,765ft-lb) @ 1,000 rpm | 17.5:1(D16B), 18:1(D16A) | 144mm (5.67 inches) | 165mm (6.50 inches) | 16,123cc (984CI) | 1993-2006 |
| D16C | 410-455kW (550-610hp) @ 1,450-1,800 rpm | 2,500-2,800Nm (1,844-2,065ft-lb) @ 950-1,500 rpm | 17:1 (610), 18:1 (550) | 144mm (5.67 inches) | 165mm (6.50 inches) | 16,123cc (984CI) | 2006-present |
| D16E | 346-492kW (470-660hp) @ 1,450-1,900 rpm | 1,850-3,100Nm (1,365-2,286ft-lb) @ 1,000-1,450 rpm | 17.3:1 (540, 660), 18:1 (580) | 144mm (5.67 inches) | 165mm (6.50 inches) | 16,123cc (984CI) | 2006-present |
| D16G | 403-522kW (540-700hp) @ 1,450-1,900 rpm | 2,650-3,150 Nm (1,954-2,323ft-lb) @ 1,000-1,550 rpm | 17.3:1 (600), 16.8:1 (540, 700) | 144mm (5.67 inches) | 165mm (6.50 inches) | 16,123cc (984CI) | 2006-present |
| D16K | 410-550kW (550-750hp) @ 1,350-1,900 rpm | 2,800-3,550Nm (2,065-2,618ft-lb) @ 900-1,450 rpm | 16:1 | 144mm (5.67 inches) | 165mm (6.50 inches) | 16,123cc (984CI) | 2015-2024 |

== D17 ==
| Model | Power | Torque | Compression Ratio | Bore | Stroke | Displacement | Year |
|---|---|---|---|---|---|---|---|
| D17A | 447-582kW (600-780hp) @ 1,400-1,900 rpm | 3,000-3,800Nm (2,212-2,802ft-lb) @ 850-1,400 rpm | 17.3:1 | 149mm (5.87 inches) | 165mm (6.50 inches) | 17,262cc (1056CI) | 2024-present |
