= List of Perkins engines =

In this List of Perkins engines, family type refers to the two letter designation Perkins Engines gives each engine. This nomenclature was introduced in 1978 under Perkins' new engine numbering scheme, where the family type is encoded in each unique serial number. Engines that went out of production prior to 1978 may have been retroactively assigned a family type to expedite parts support (this is the case with the Perkins 4.107). Some engines never entered production, such as the Perkins 4.224, but were assigned a family type. In the early years, Perkins gave names to their engines, beginning with the smallest Wolf. The larger Lynx and Leopard followed (all four-cylinders), with the 1937 P6 intended to be called the "Panther." After a lawsuit from motorcycle manufacturer Phelon & Moore, Perkins dropped the Panther (and Python and Puma for the corresponding P3 and P4 models) and stuck to abbreviations from then on.

Perkins was sold by Massey Ferguson's parent Varity Corporation in 1998, and is now a fully owned subsidiary of Caterpillar Inc.

Perkins engine Designations
Family type Code	Engine name	Layout	Displacement	Bore	Stroke	Production Dates	Notes
AA	1004-4	I4	3,990 cc (243.5 cu in)	100 mm (3.94 in)	127 mm (5.00 in)		Also sold as the Phaser 90, it has 90 hp (67 kW; 91 PS). Also known as 4.40
AB	1004-4T	I4	3,990 cc (243.5 cu in)	100 mm (3.94 in)	127 mm (5.00 in)		Turbocharged version of the AA, sold as the Phaser 110T (110 hp). Also known as T4.40
AC	1004-4T	I4	3,990 cc (243.5 cu in)	100 mm (3.94 in)	127 mm (5.00 in)		
AD	1004-4TW	I4	3,990 cc (243.5 cu in)	100 mm (3.94 in)	127 mm (5.00 in)		With intercooler, sold as the Phaser 120Ti. Also known as C4.40
AE	FCC4.40	I4	3,990 cc (243.5 cu in)	100 mm (3.94 in)	127 mm (5.00 in)		Federal emissions
AF	1004-40S	I4	3,990 cc (243.5 cu in)	100 mm (3.94 in)	127 mm (5.00 in)		Petrol engine
AG	1004-4	I4	3,990 cc (243.5 cu in)	100 mm (3.94 in)	127 mm (5.00 in)		
AH	1004-4T	I4	3,990 cc (243.5 cu in)	100 mm (3.94 in)	127 mm (5.00 in)		
AJ	4.401	I4	3,990 cc (243.5 cu in)	100 mm (3.94 in)	127 mm (5.00 in)		
AK	T4.401	I4	3,990 cc (243.5 cu in)	100 mm (3.94 in)	127 mm (5.00 in)		
AL	CCA4.401	I4	3,990 cc (243.5 cu in)	100 mm (3.94 in)	127 mm (5.00 in)		Air-to-air charge cooled
AM	CCW4.401	I4	3,990 cc (243.5 cu in)	100 mm (3.94 in)	127 mm (5.00 in)		
AP	N4.401	I4	3,990 cc (243.5 cu in)	100 mm (3.94 in)	127 mm (5.00 in)		Narrow front end.
AQ	TN4.401	I4	3,990 cc (243.5 cu in)	100 mm (3.94 in)	127 mm (5.00 in)		
AR	1004.42	I4	4,233 cc (258.3 cu in)	103 mm (4.06 in)	127 mm (5.00 in)		Sold to HYSTER corp. for use in small to medium lift trucks.
AS	H4.421	I4	4,233 cc (258.3 cu in)	103 mm (4.06 in)	127 mm (5.00 in)		
AT	CCAN4.401	I4	3,990 cc (243.5 cu in)	100 mm (3.94 in)	127 mm (5.00 in)		Narrow front end version of CCA4.401 (AL)
BA	4.20	I4	1,994 cc (121.7 cu in)	84.5 mm (3.33 in)	88.9 mm (3.50 in)		Produced as a Joint venture between Perkins, UK government and the Austin Rover Group. Based on the Austin Rover O series engine this engine had major parts produced at Longbridge by Austin Rover with final assembly by Perkins. It was entirely designed by Perkins who also sold it to external customers. It was used by Austin Rover in the Austin Maestro and by LDV Group in their 2.5-tonne van.
BB	T4.20	I4	1,994 cc (121.7 cu in)	84.5 mm (3.33 in)	88.9 mm (3.50 in)		As with the 4.20 but turbocharged with an intercooler. Used by Austin Rover in the Montego and later the Maestro.
CA	P3	I3	2,365 cc (144.3 cu in)	88.9 mm (3.5 in)	127.0 mm (5 in)	1953–11 to 1967-03	Three-cylinder diesel engine. Engine serial is a seven digit number beginning with 1000251. 67,433 engines were produced. Uses a timing chain.
none	F3	I3	2,365 cc (144.3 cu in)	88.9 mm (3.5 in)	127.0 mm (5 in)	1957–08 to 1964-10	Three-cylinder diesel engine. Built for Ford, with Simms injector pump. (Ford supplied all the block and head castings).
CB	3.144	I3	2,365 cc (144.3 cu in)	88.9 mm (3.5 in)	127.0 mm (5 in)		
CC	P3.144	I3	2,365 cc (144.3 cu in)	88.9 mm (3.5 in)	127.0 mm (5 in)	1957–03 to 1969-05	2,691 UK-built engines and 454 France-built engines were produced for Massey Ferguson; 30,346 were produced for other customers.
CD	3.152	I3	2,502 cc (152.7 cu in)	91.4 mm (3.6 in)	127.0 mm (5 in)		used in many Lincoln brand mobile welders.
none	F3.152	I3	2,502 cc (152.7 cu in)	91.4 mm (3.6 in)	127.0 mm (5 in)	1962–02 to 1964-09	Diesel engine. No family type. Built for Ford (Ford supplied the block & head castings) 64,496 made. Fitted to the Super Dexta
CE	D3.152	I3	2,502 cc (152.7 cu in)	91.4 mm (3.6 in)	127.0 mm (5 in)		Direct-injection versions of earlier 3.152 engine types. Produced for Massey Ferguson and other customers including Volvo (tractors)
CF	G3.152	I3	2,502 cc (152.7 cu in)	91.4 mm (3.6 in)	127.0 mm (5 in)		G denotes petrol version. Spark-ignition variant of D3152 produced for common installation in Fork lift truck where D3152 engine was specified.
CG	P3.152	I3	2,502 cc (152.7 cu in)	91.4 mm (3.6 in)	127.0 mm (5 in)		
CJ	3.1522	I3	2,502 cc (152.7 cu in)	91.4 mm (3.6 in)	127.0 mm (5 in)		Development of D3152 using Perkins "squish lip" piston to give improved driveability of engine in emissions sensitive applications such as Fork Lift.
CM	3.1524	I3	2,502 cc (152.7 cu in)	91.4 mm (3.6 in)	127.0 mm (5 in)		Uprated D3152 engine. Board decision named this engine .4 despite no .3 ever existing due to recent launch of 6.354.4 and its success.
CN	T3.1524	I3	2,502 cc (152.7 cu in)	91.4 mm (3.6 in)	127.0 mm (5 in)		Turbocharged version of 3.152.4. Initially used by Lindner, later by Massey Ferguson.
CP	3.27, 903-27	I3	2,701 cc (164.8 cu in)	95 mm (3.74 in)	127.0 mm (5 in)		Modernized version of 3.152 (CD)
CR	T3.27, 903-27T	I3	2,701 cc (164.8 cu in)	95 mm (3.74 in)	127.0 mm (5 in)		
CS	903-25	I3	2,502 cc (152.7 cu in)	91.4 mm (3.6 in)	127.0 mm (5 in)		Unknown if entered production
CT	G3.27, 903-27S	I3	2,701 cc (164.8 cu in)	95 mm (3.74 in)	127.0 mm (5 in)		Petrol-powered version of 903-27
DC	1103C-33	I3	3,299 cc (201.3 cu in)	105 mm (4.13 in)	127.0 mm (5 in)		
DD	1103C-33T	I3	3,299 cc (201.3 cu in)	105 mm (4.13 in)	127.0 mm (5 in)		
DE	1103C-33TA	I3	3,299 cc (201.3 cu in)	105 mm (4.13 in)	127.0 mm (5 in)		
DF	1103B-33	I3	3,299 cc (201.3 cu in)	105 mm (4.13 in)	127.0 mm (5 in)		
DG	1103B-33T	I3	3,299 cc (201.3 cu in)	105 mm (4.13 in)	127.0 mm (5 in)		
DJ	1103A-33	I3	3,299 cc (201.3 cu in)	105 mm (4.13 in)	127.0 mm (5 in)		
DK	1103A-33T	I3	3,299 cc (201.3 cu in)	105 mm (4.13 in)	127.0 mm (5 in)		
EA	4.99	I4	1,621 cc (98.9 cu in)	76.2 mm (3.0 in)	88.9 mm (3.5 in)		Wet sleeves, used in London Taxis, optional fit in Ford Thames vans, early Ford Transits, Bedford CA vans, Citroën HY, and countless others.
EB	4.107	I4	1,760 cc (107.4 cu in)	79.4 mm (3.125 in)	88.9 mm (3.5 in)		Wet sleeve diesel engine, commonly used in marine applications.
EC	T4.107	I4	1,760 cc (107.4 cu in)	79.4 mm (3.125 in)	88.9 mm (3.5 in)		Turbocharged diesel engine, wet sleeves. Very rare (perhaps never produced).
ED	4.108	I4	1,760 cc (107.4 cu in)	79.4 mm (3.125 in)	88.9 mm (3.5 in)		Dry sleeved diesel engine, an evolution of the 4.99 and 4.107. Almost 500,000 engines produced between the 4.99, 4.107 and 4.108. Used extensively in vans and light trucks, Ford Transit, Hyundai HD1000 Truck and Van (1977-1981), Bedford CA, some cars Opel Blitz, Alfa Romeo F12/A12, Alfa Romeo Giulia, SEAT 131. Also used extensively in marine applications, farm equipment and Mustang/OMC skid-steer loaders. A turbocharged version with 65 hp known as the T4.108 was offered for light commercials, taxis and cars from 1981 though it is not known how many were made or if it even reached production.
GA	4.154	I4	2,523 cc (154.0 cu in)	88.9 mm (3.5 in)	101.6 mm (4.0 in)		Designed with sister engine 6.231; both produced in England. Later produced by licensee Toyo Kogyo as the Mazda XA series. Later developed into 4.165/6.247 family. 4.154 was also an optional fit in Bedford CF vans
GB	4.135	I4	2,209 cc (134.8 cu in)	88.9 mm (3.5 in)	88.9 mm (3.5 in)		Short stroke version of the 4.154. Produced only by Toyo Kogyo (Mazda). Variant used in '82-'84 B2200 trucks and in '83-'84 Ford Ranger Diesels. Pushrod, dry sleeves, and gear drive
GC	4.182	I4	2,977 cc (181.7 cu in)	95.0 mm (3.74 in)	105.0 mm (4.13 in)		Based on 4.154. Produced only by Toyo Kogyo (Mazda)
GD	204.25	I4	2,523 cc (154.0 cu in)	88.9 mm (3.5 in)	101.6 mm (4.0 in)		Updated version of 4.154.
GE	204.30	I4	2,977 cc (181.7 cu in)	95.0 mm (3.74 in)	105.0 mm (4.13 in)		Updated version of 4.182.
GG	402D-05	I2	507 cc (30.9 cu in)	67.0 mm (2.64 in)	72.0 mm (2.83 in)		Direct injection diesel industrial engine with 13.7 bhp (10.2 kW)
GH	403D-07	I3	762 cc (46.5 cu in)	67.0 mm (2.64 in)	72.0 mm (2.83 in)		Three-cylinder version of 402D-05
GJ	403D-11	I3	1,131 cc (69.0 cu in)	77.0 mm (3.03 in)	81.0 mm (3.19 in)		Tier 3 EPA rated Engine replaced the 103.10 in the Caterpillar Arr# 145-6693 like in mini ex 301.8, also known as 403.10.
GK	403D-15	I3	1,496 cc (91.3 cu in)	84.0 mm (3.31 in)	90.0 mm (3.54 in)		Direct injection, diesel industrial engine
GL	403D-15T	I3	1,496 cc (91.3 cu in)	84.0 mm (3.31 in)	90.0 mm (3.54 in)		Turbocharged, direct injection, diesel industrial engine
GM	404D-15	I4	1,508 cc (92.0 cu in)	77.0 mm (3.03 in)	81.0 mm (3.19 in)		Direct injection, diesel industrial engine
GN	404D-22	I4	2,216 cc (135.2 cu in)	84.0 mm (3.31 in)	100.0 mm (3.94 in)		Direct injection, diesel industrial engine
GP	404D-22T	I4	2,216 cc (135.2 cu in)	84.0 mm (3.31 in)	100.0 mm (3.94 in)		Turbocharged, direct injection, diesel industrial engine
HA	4.165	I4	2,702 cc (164.9 cu in)	92.0 mm (3.62 in)	101.6 mm (4.0 in)	1976-01–1982-11	Diesel engine based on 4.154, also as the six-cylinder 6.247. Assembled by Perkins in Hannover for VW LT van (engine code CG), and by Enasa in Spain for various vehicles including the Nissan Patrol (as the MD27). Nissan's Spanish subsidiary eventually built a bored out version of this as the Nissan A4.28 (or A428), including a turbocharged A428T model and the updated A428II.
JA	P4	I4	3,153 cc (192.4 cu in)	88.9 mm (3.5 in)	127.0 mm (5 in)	1937–06 to 1967-05	Diesel engine; four-cylinder derivative of P3. 97,390 engines were produced.
JB	4.192	I4	3,153 cc (192.4 cu in)	88.9 mm (3.5 in)	127.0 mm (5 in)	1958–05 to 1972-01	Indirect-injection diesel engine, used in the MF 65 mk.1 tractor, and in the Hotchkiss DH50 truck.
JC	P4.192	I4	3,153 cc (192.4 cu in)	88.9 mm (3.5 in)	127.0 mm (5 in)		no information
JD	4.203	I4	3,336 cc (203.6 cu in)	91.4 mm (3.6 in)	127.0 mm (5 in)		diesel engine.
JE	D4.203	I4	3,336 cc (203.6 cu in)	91.4 mm (3.6 in)	127.0 mm (5 in)		Direct-injection diesel engine. Used in the MF 65 mk.2 and MF 165 mk.1 tractors.
JF	G4.203	I4	3,336 cc (203.6 cu in)	91.4 mm (3.6 in)	127.0 mm (5 in)		Petrol version.
JG	4.2032	I4	3,336 cc (203.6 cu in)	91.4 mm (3.6 in)	127.0 mm (5 in)		
LA	4.212	I4	3,479 cc (212.3 cu in)	98.4 mm (3.875 in)	114.3 mm (4.5 in)		Diesel engine, a 4.236 with a smaller stroke. Used in the MF 165 mk.2 and International Harvester 475 tractors.
LC	none	I4	3,661 cc (223.4 cu in)	101.0 mm (3.975 in)	114.3 mm (4.5 in)		This family type was reserved for a version of the 4.212 using the bigger bore of the 4.248, but it never entered production.
none	L4	I4	4,417 cc (269.5 cu in)	108.0 mm (4.25 in)	120.7 mm (4.75 in)	1952–10 to 1961-07	Indirect-injection diesel engine. Commonly used in agricultural applications. No family type. Replaced by direct-injection 4.270.
LD	4.236	I4	3,865 cc (235.9 cu in)	98.4 mm (3.875 in)	127.0 mm (5.0 in)		Four-cylinder, 236 cu. in. (3.9 L) diesel engine.
LE	G4.236	I4	3,865 cc (235.9 cu in)	98.4 mm (3.875 in)	127.0 mm (5.0 in)		Petrol (or propane) variant of 4.236.
LF	4.248	I4	4,068 cc (248.2 cu in)	101.0 mm (3.975 in)	127.0 mm (5.0 in)		248 cu. in. (4.1 L) diesel engine. Essentially, a 4.236 with a larger bore.
LG	4.2482	I4	4,068 cc (248.2 cu in)	101.0 mm (3.975 in)	127.0 mm (5.0 in)		This development of the 4.236 series was designed to use the Perkins "squish lip" piston which gave emissions benefits although had lower specific output compared to conventional direct-injection engines. It was used in fork lift applications as an alternative to the smaller 4.236.
LH	C4.236	I4	3,865 cc (235.9 cu in)	98.4 mm (3.875 in)	127.0 mm (5.0 in)		"Compensated" (lightly turbocharged) diesel engine.
LJ	T4.236	I4	3,865 cc (235.9 cu in)	98.4 mm (3.875 in)	127.0 mm (5.0 in)		turbocharged diesel engine.
none	T4.38	I4	3,865 cc (235.9 cu in)	98.4 mm (3.875 in)	127.0 mm (5.0 in)		Modernized T4.236; uses the CAV DPS fuel injection pump rather than the DPA on earlier models.
LM	4.41	I4	4,068 cc (248.2 cu in)	101.0 mm (3.975 in)	127.0 mm (5.0 in)		Modernized version of 4.248
NA	4.270	I4	4,417 cc (269.5 cu in)	108.0 mm (4.25 in)	120.7 mm (4.75 in)	1958–12 to 1974–04	Direct injection diesel engine, developed from earlier L4 unit.
NB	4.300	I4	4,952 cc (302.2 cu in)	114.3 mm (4.5 in)	120.7 mm (4.75 in)		76 bhp (57 kW) at 2200 rpm, 17.5:1 compression ratio, dry weight 787 lb (357 kg) without flywheel
NC	4.318	I4	5,212 cc (318.1 cu in)	114.3 mm (4.5 in)	127.0 mm (5.0 in)		Diesel engine, enlarged version of 4.270 with 86 bhp (64 kW). Used in MF 1080, 595.
ND	4.3182	I4	5,212 cc (318.1 cu in)	114.3 mm (4.5 in)	127.0 mm (5.0 in)		Improved version. Used in MF 698.
PA	P6	I6	4,730 cc (288.6 cu in)	88.9 mm (3.5 in)	127.0 mm (5 in)	1938–01 to 1961-04	Rated at 86 bhp at 2,600 rpm. The highly successful P-series of engines established Perkins' reputation as one of the world's major builders of diesel engines.
PB	6.288	I6	4,730 cc (288.6 cu in)	88.9 mm (3.5 in)	127.0 mm (5 in)	1960–04 to 1964-01	diesel engine, updated version of the P6.
PC	6.305	I6	5,004 cc (305.4 cu in)	91.4 mm (3.6 in)	127.0 mm (5 in)	1959–03 to 1970-02	Direct injection diesel engine, enlarged version of P6 using CAV DPA injection pump.
none	C.305	I6	5,004 cc (305.4 cu in)	91.4 mm (3.6 in)	127.0 mm (5 in)	1958–06 to 1961–05.	Horizontal version of 6.305, developed in conjunction with Commer Cars Ltd.
RA	6.247	I6	4,052 cc (247.3 cu in)	92.0 mm (3.62 in)	101.6 mm (4.0 in)		Normally aspirated diesel, only ever fitted to Dodge 50 range in the UK (sourced in Japan). Also known as the 'Black' Perkins engine. Most were made under license by Mazda as the ZB and used in their light trucks during the late 1970s and 1980s.
RE	1104C-44	I4	4,399 cc (268.4 cu in)	105.0 mm (4.13 in)	127.0 mm (5.00 in)		Naturally aspirated (RE, RF) or turbocharged (RG, RH, RJ, RK) diesel. OEM power unit Fitted to JCB Loadall or Thwaites Dumpers.
none	R6	I6	5,560 cc (339.3 cu in)	101.6 mm (4.0 in)	114.3 mm (4.5 in)	1952-12 to 1962-01	Indirect-injection diesel engine, rated at 108 bhp at 2,700 rpm and 240 lb ft at 1,500/1,750 rpm. Rushed development led to major problems with this engine, with consequent damage to both Perkins' reputation and finances. Although, the problems were solved quite quickly and the engine was relaunched as the R6 Mk2, with a reduced rating of 104 bhp at 2,500 rpm. Sales never recovered after the early problems and only 33,800 engines were built before production ended in 1962. Production continued in Brazil as the 6.340 and later as the larger 6.357.
none	6.340	I6	5,560 cc (339.3 cu in)	101.6 mm (4.0 in)	114.3 mm (4.5 in)		Updated version of the R6 Mk2, built in Brazil by Motores Perkins S.A. until the 1980s.
none	6.357	I6	5,842 cc (356.5 cu in)	104.1 mm (4.1 in)	114.3 mm (4.5 in)		Bored out version of the Brazilian 6.340; the 6.357-2 used the CAV DPA pump, 6.357TA and 6.357V derivatives also developed.
none	6.358	I6	5,842 cc (356.5 cu in)	104.1 mm (4.1 in)	114.3 mm (4.5 in)		Direct-injection version of the 6.357.
none	S6	I6	7,391 cc (451.0 cu in)	111.13 mm (4.375 in)	127.0 mm (5 in)	1939–05 to 1962-10	Very similar to the highly successful P6, the S6 diesel engine was rated at 115 bhp at 2,000 rpm for passenger vehicles and 105 bhp at 1,800 rpm for goods vehicles. Also marinised as Power-Marine by British Powerboat Company at 130 bhp for different boats including RAF Seaplane Tenders
TA	6.306	I6	5,004 cc (305.4 cu in)	91.4 mm (3.6 in)	127.0 mm (5 in)	1965–12 to 1975–12.	Diesel engine, smaller bore than related 6.354. Possibly only used in the Australian Chamberlain Champion 306 and C670 tractors. Not to be confused with the 6.305.
TC	6.354	I6	5,798 cc (353.8 cu in)	98.4 mm (3.875 in)	127.0 mm (5 in)	1960 to 1996	Diesel engine, initially rated at 112 bhp at 2,800 rpm and later at 120 bhp. Highly successful engine which restored Perkins' reputation after the problematic R6. Developments of the engine, including turbocharged versions remained in production until 1996, by which time over a million had been built at Peterborough plus substantial numbers in other countries.
TD	H6.354	I6	5,798 cc (353.8 cu in)	98.4 mm (3.875 in)	127.0 mm (5 in)		horizontal diesel engine. A slant engine, used in marine applications. Very rare.
TE	T6.354	I6	5,798 cc (353.8 cu in)	98.4 mm (3.875 in)	127.0 mm (5 in)		turbocharged diesel engine.
TF	HT6.354	I6	5,798 cc (353.8 cu in)	98.4 mm (3.875 in)	127.0 mm (5 in)		horizontal turbocharged diesel engine. Very rare.
TG	6.3541	I6	5,798 cc (353.8 cu in)	98.4 mm (3.875 in)	127.0 mm (5 in)		
TH	T6.3541	I6	5,798 cc (353.8 cu in)	98.4 mm (3.875 in)	127.0 mm (5 in)		
TJ	6.3542	I6	5,798 cc (353.8 cu in)	98.4 mm (3.875 in)	127.0 mm (5 in)		
TK	C6.3542	I6	5,798 cc (353.8 cu in)	98.4 mm (3.875 in)	127.0 mm (5 in)		
TP	T6.3543	I6	5,798 cc (353.8 cu in)	98.4 mm (3.875 in)	127.0 mm (5 in)		
TR	6.372	I6	6,101 cc (372.3 cu in)	101.0 mm (3.975 in)	127.0 mm (5 in)		Larger bore version of 6.354. Same size bore as 4.248. Only used in MF combine.
TT	TC6.3544	I6	5,798 cc (353.8 cu in)	98.4 mm (3.875 in)	127.0 mm (5 in)		
TU	T6.3544	I6	5,798 cc (353.8 cu in)	98.4 mm (3.875 in)	127.0 mm (5 in)		
TV	T6.3724	I6	6,101 cc (372.3 cu in)	101.0 mm (3.975 in)	127.0 mm (5 in)		Larger bore version of 6.354. Same size bore as 4.248. Only used in MF combine.
TW	6.3544	I6	5,798 cc (353.8 cu in)	98.4 mm (3.875 in)	127.0 mm (5 in)		
TX	C6.3544	I6	5,798 cc (353.8 cu in)	98.4 mm (3.875 in)	127.0 mm (5 in)		
TY	H6.3544	I6	5,798 cc (353.8 cu in)	98.4 mm (3.875 in)	127.0 mm (5 in)		
TZ	HT6.3544	I6	5,798 cc (353.8 cu in)	98.4 mm (3.875 in)	127.0 mm (5 in)		
UA	704.30	I4	2,956 cc (180.4 cu in)	97.0 mm (3.82 in)	100.0 mm (3.94 in)		Direct injection, diesel industrial/agricultural engine
UB	704.26	I4	2,602 cc (158.8 cu in)	91.01 mm (3.58 in)	100.0 mm (3.94 in)		Indirect injection, forklift engine
UC	704.30T	I4	2,956 cc (180.4 cu in)	97.0 mm (3.82 in)	100.0 mm (3.94 in)		Turbocharged, direct injection, diesel/agricultural industrial engine
XA	V8.510	V8	8,369 cc (510.7 cu in)	108.0 mm (4.25 in)	114.3 mm (4.5 in)		diesel engine.
XB	TV8.510	V8	8,369 cc (510.7 cu in)	108.0 mm (4.25 in)	114.3 mm (4.5 in)		turbocharged diesel engine.
XC	V8.540	V8	8,834 cc (539.1 cu in)	108.0 mm (4.25 in)	120.7 mm (4.75 in)		diesel engine.
XE	TV8.540	V8	8,834 cc (539.1 cu in)	108.0 mm (4.25 in)	120.7 mm (4.75 in)		turbocharged diesel engine.
XG	1103D-E33	I3	3,299 cc (201.3 cu in)	105.0 mm (4.13 in)	127.0 mm (5.00 in)		Electronic Governing
XH	1103D-E33T	I3	3,299 cc (201.3 cu in)	105.0 mm (4.13 in)	127.0 mm (5.00 in)		Electronic Governing / Turbocharged
XJ	1103D-E33TA	I3	3,299 cc (201.3 cu in)	105.0 mm (4.13 in)	127.0 mm (5.00 in)		Electronic Governing / Turbocharged / Air to air charge cooled
XK	1103D-33	I3	3,299 cc (201.3 cu in)	105.0 mm (4.13 in)	127.0 mm (5.00 in)		
XL	1103D-33T	I3	3,299 cc (201.3 cu in)	105.0 mm (4.13 in)	127.0 mm (5.00 in)		Turbocharged
XM	1103D-33TA	I3	3,299 cc (201.3 cu in)	105.0 mm (4.13 in)	127.0 mm (5.00 in)		Turbocharged / Air to air charge cooled
YA	1006-6	I6	5,985 cc (365.2 cu in)	100.0 mm (3.94 in)	127.0 mm (5.00 in)		Six-cylinder version of "AA" Phaser engine, continued Perkins "one litre per cylinder" design.
YB	1006-6T	I6	5,985 cc (365.2 cu in)	100.0 mm (3.94 in)	127.0 mm (5.00 in)	Unknown - 2014	Turbocharged version of the above, also known as the Phaser 160T for its 160 hp (119 kW) max power.
YC	1006-6T	I6	5,985 cc (365.2 cu in)	100.0 mm (3.94 in)	127.0 mm (5.00 in)		No longer in production.
YD	1006e-6TW	I6	5,985 cc (365.2 cu in)	100.0 mm (3.94 in)	127.0 mm (5.00 in)	Unknown - 2014	Intercooled model with 180 hp (134 kW) max power, marketed as the Phaser 180Ti.
YF	1006-60S	I6	5,985 cc (365.2 cu in)	100.0 mm (3.94 in)	127.0 mm (5.00 in)		No longer in production.
YG	1006-60	I6	5,985 cc (365.2 cu in)	100.0 mm (3.94 in)	127.0 mm (5.00 in)		No longer in production.
YH	1006-60T	I6	5,985 cc (365.2 cu in)	100.0 mm (3.94 in)	127.0 mm (5.00 in)		No longer in production.
YJ	1006-60TA	I6	5,985 cc (365.2 cu in)	100.0 mm (3.94 in)	127.0 mm (5.00 in)		No longer in production.
YK	1006-60TW	I6	5,985 cc (365.2 cu in)	100.0 mm (3.94 in)	127.0 mm (5.00 in)		No longer in production.
ZA	V8.640	V8	10,484 cc (639.8 cu in)	117.6 mm (4.63 in)	120.7 mm (4.75 in)		Diesel engine.
ZB	TV8.640	V8	10,484 cc (639.8 cu in)	117.6 mm (4.63 in)	120.7 mm (4.75 in)		turbocharged diesel engine.
none	T12	V12	33,360 cc (2,035.8 cu in)	152.4 mm (6 in)	152.4 mm (6 in)		Supercharged diesel engine developed for marine use during the war; 5-6 prototypes were built. Perkins used one as a standby generator at the factory until the 1980s; it is now in preservation.
none	2000/3000 Series						Mechanical (Shrewsbury) engine plant closed in 2002 and production of these engines ceased. Horizontal version of the 2000 series used in some British Rail diesel multiple units, e.g. classes 158, 165, 166. Designated 2006 TW-H
	1206-TA	I6	7,014 cc (428.0 cu in)	105.0 mm (4.13 in)	135.0 mm (5.31 in)		Turbodiesel, made in Peterborough, UK.
	1506-TA	I6	8,808 cc (537.5 cu in)	112.0 mm (4.41 in)	149.0 mm (5.87 in)		Turbodiesel, made in Seguin, USA Caterpillar factory.
	1606-TA	I6	9,354 cc (570.8 cu in)	116.6 mm (4.59 in)	146.0 mm (5.75 in)	2015 - 2017	Turbodiesel, made in Seguin, USA Caterpillar factory.
	2206-TA	I6	12,503 cc (763.0 cu in)	130.0 mm (5.12 in)	157.0 mm (6.18 in)		Turbodiesel; originally made in Stafford, UK, now all made in Seguin, USA Caterpillar factory.
	2506-TA	I6	15,124 cc (922.9 cu in)	137.0 mm (5.39 in)	171.0 mm (6.73 in)		Turbodiesel; originally made in Stafford, UK, now all made in Seguin, USA Caterpillar factory.
	2806-TA	I6	18,131 cc (1,106.4 cu in)	145.0 mm (5.71 in)	183.0 mm (7.20 in)		Turbodiesel; originally made in Stafford, UK, now all made in Seguin, USA Caterpillar factory.
	2806-TTA	I6	18,131 cc (1,106.4 cu in)	145.0 mm (5.71 in)	183.0 mm (7.20 in)	2018-	Twin-turbo diesel; originally made in Stafford, UK, now all made in Seguin, USA Caterpillar factory.
DGDF, DGBF	4006 Series Diesel	I6	22,921 cc (1,398.7 cu in)	160.0 mm (6.30 in)	190.0 mm (7.48 in)		turbocharged air-to-air charge-cooled diesel engine.
DIEF, DIFF, DGDF	4006 Series Gas	I6	22,921 cc (1,398.7 cu in)	160.0 mm (6.30 in)	190.0 mm (7.48 in)		turbocharged charge-cooled spark-ignition gas engine.
DGAH, DGBH	4008 Series Diesel	V8	30,562 cc (1,865.0 cu in)	160.0 mm (6.30 in)	190.0 mm (7.48 in)		turbocharged, air-to-air charge-cooled diesel engine.
DIEH, DIFH, DIHH, DIJH	4008 Series Gas	V8	30,562 cc (1,865.0 cu in)	160.0 mm (6.30 in)	190.0 mm (7.48 in)		turbocharged, charge-cooled spark-ignition gas engine.
DGDM, DGBM, DGNM, DGKM	4012 Series Diesel	V12	45,842 cc (2,797.5 cu in)	160.0 mm (6.30 in)	190.0 mm (7.48 in)		turbocharged, diesel, available in Air-to-Air (TAG) and Air-to-Water (TWG) charge-cooled models.
DIEM, DIFM	4012 Series Gas	V12	45,842 cc (2,797.5 cu in)	160.0 mm (6.30 in)	190.0 mm (7.48 in)		Turbocharged, charge-cooled spark-ignition gas engine. The 4012 gas product has been discontinued and is no longer available.
DGWR, DGPR, DGXR	4016 Series Diesel	V16	61,123 cc (3,730.0 cu in)	160.0 mm (6.30 in)	190.0 mm (7.48 in)		turbocharged, charge-cooled diesel, available in Air-to-Air (TAG) and Air-to-Water (TRG) charge-cooled.
DIER, DIFR	4016 Series Gas	V16	61,123 cc (3,730.0 cu in)	160.0 mm (6.30 in)	190.0 mm (7.48 in)		turbocharged charge-cooled spark-ignition gas engine.

== See also ==
- Perkins Engines - Company article
- Frank Perkins - Founder of the Company
- Massey Ferguson - Former parent company of Perkins engines
