= Irv Gordon =

World record-holder for driving a single car

Irvin "Irv" Gordon (1940 – November 15, 2018) was an American retired teacher known for setting the Guinness World Record for most miles driven by a single owner in a non-commercial vehicle.

== Record-setting Volvo ownership ==
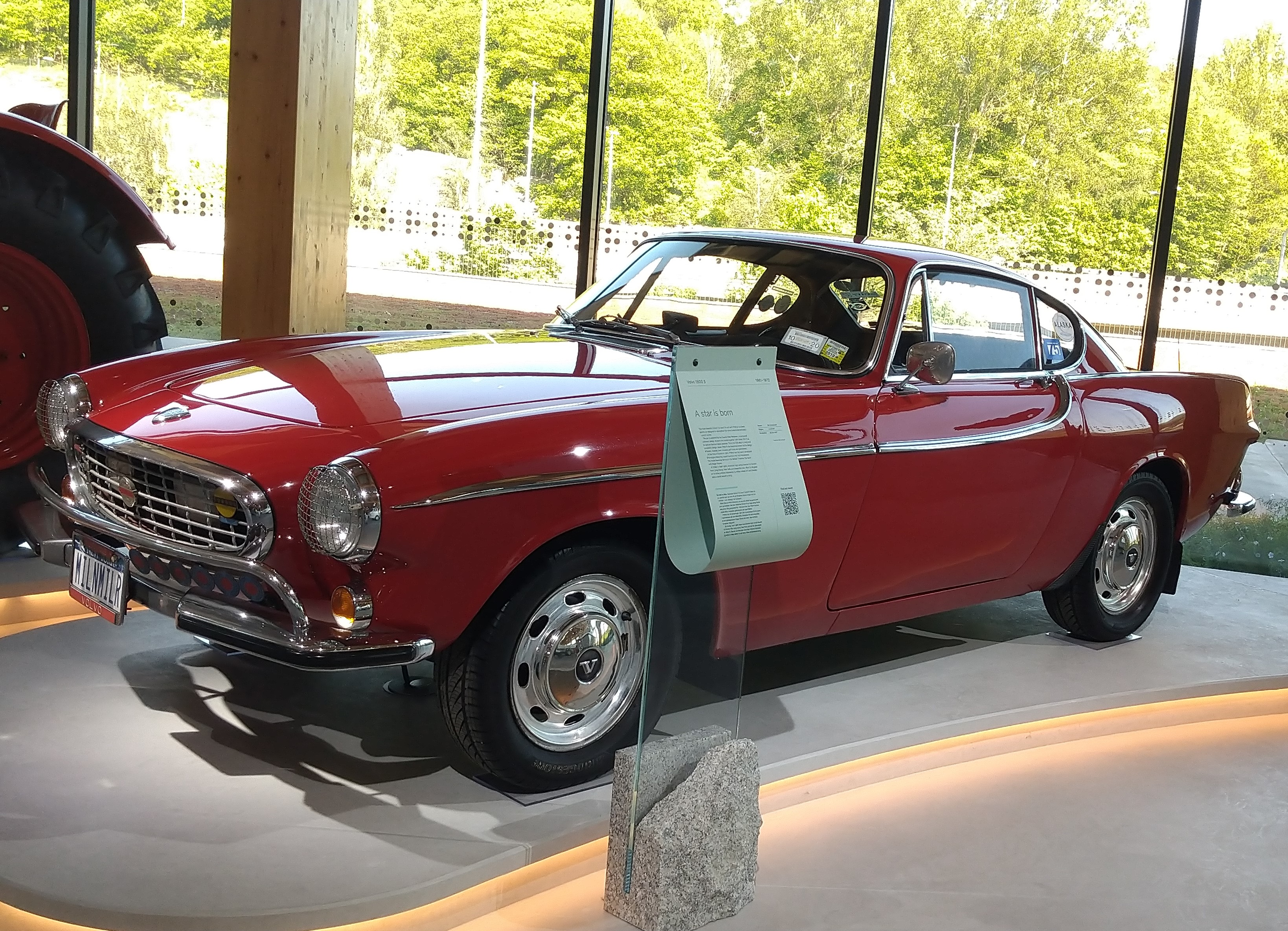
Irv Gordon's Volvo P1800S, permanently displayed at World of Volvo

Gordon purchased his Volvo P1800S in June 1966 from Volvoville, a dealership in Huntersville, New York. He had owned two new Chevrolet Corvair models, but was dissatisfied with their reliability. At the time, Gordon's daily commute was around 125 miles (201 km).

Gordon decided to maximize the car's mileage after hitting 250,000 miles (400,000 km), having never had to repair the car outside of its routine scheduled maintenance. The car's engine was rebuilt after 680,000 miles (1,090,000 km) – Gordon insisted on the service as a precautionary measure, despite the dealership advising it was unnecessary. It transpired there had been nothing wrong with the engine, and Gordon said he "learned his lesson" about unnecessary maintenance.

He set the record for most miles driven by a single owner in a non-commercial vehicle in 1998, when he had driven 1,690,000 miles (2,720,000 km) in the car, claiming the Guinness World Record. He had driven 2,000,000 miles (3,200,000 km) by 2002, and 3,000,000 miles (4,800,000 km) by 2013. The car had a second engine rebuild in 2009, when wear on bearings and piston rings led to pressure loss. Its bodywork also had to be repaired after it was damaged by a freight company who were transporting it to the annual SEMA show to be displayed at the Volvo stand.

Gordon performed much of the car's routine maintenance personally, such as the changing the engine oil and filter and servicing the car's brakes. Other mechanical work was generally carried out by mechanic Nino Gambino, who first worked on the car in 1979. He had driven 3,260,257 miles (5,246,875 km) by October 2018, a month before his death. He had driven the car across all 49 of the continental United States, Canada, and much of Europe.

=== Relationship with Volvo ===
Volvo initially took little interest in Gordon's high-mileage car. He had written to the company twice, once after 250,000 miles (400,000 km) and again after 500,000 miles (800,000 km), only receiving a cursory response; however, Volvo took greater interest in Gordon and his P1800S as the car approached 1,000,000 miles (1,600,000 km) on the road, gifting him a new Volvo 780. Gordon drove the 780 for around 450,000 miles (720,000 km) before selling it. He was later gifted another two cars: a Volvo C70 after passing 2,000,000 miles (3,200,000 km), and a Volvo XC60 after passing 3,000,000 miles (4,800,000 km).

After setting the record, Gordon regularly collaborated with Volvo and appeared at their events. He also promoted Castrol, his preferred brand of oil. The car was returned to Volvo after Gordon's death.

== Personal life and career ==
Gordon worked as a high school science teacher. His long daily commute was the result of moving from Manhattan to Long Island, in pursuit of a more peaceful lifestyle. He retired in the 1990s. He died on November 15, 2018, while he was traveling in China with his car. He was 78 years old, and was survived by two daughters and three grandchildren.
