= Volvo VESC =

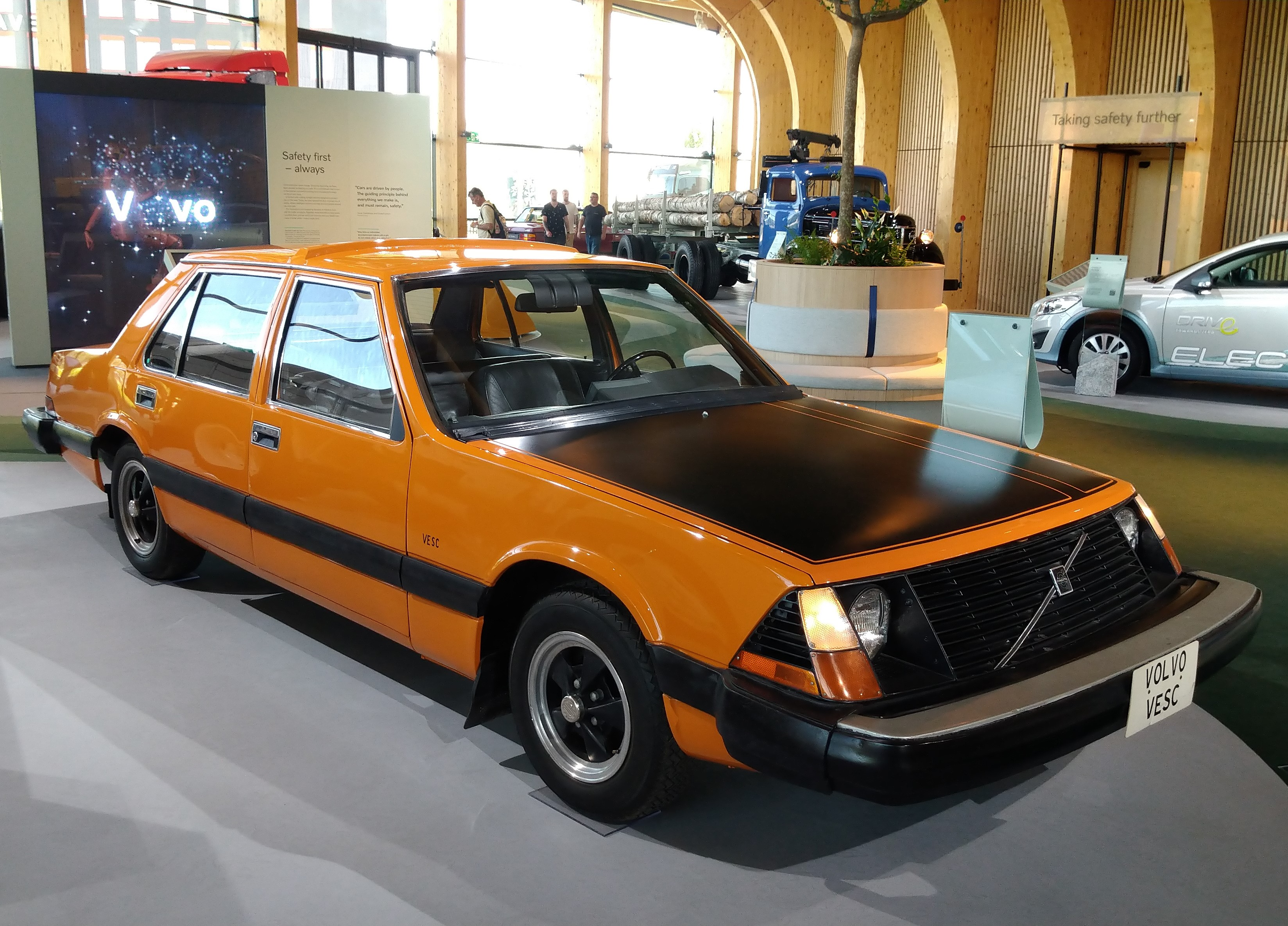
- VESC on display at the Volvo Museum

Overview
- Manufacturer: Volvo
- Also called: Volvo Experimental Safety Car
- Production: 1972

Body and chassis
- Class: Concept car
- Body style: 4-door sedan
- Layout: FR layout

Dimensions
- Length: 5,520 mm (217 in)

The Volvo VESC, the Volvo Experimental Safety Car, is a concept car made by Volvo to showcase a number of innovative passenger safety features. It was unveiled in 1972 at the Geneva Motor Show.

== History ==
In the late 1960s, Volvo had a first project with a focus on passenger safety called P1560, which resulted in a few different prototype models being made. The project was canceled in 1971, partly because of uncertainties about future safety rules - especially in the United States.

The following project was oriented along the contemporary Experimental Safety Vehicle (ESV) projects of US car companies. Using a V8 engine, it would be significantly larger than previous Volvo models. The plan called for ten prototypes, as a number had already been built into a new car model that would complement the 140 Series and become a replacement for Volvo 164. This project was also canceled, but a lot of the design and the already finished prototypes were used for the VESC project.

== Safety concepts ==
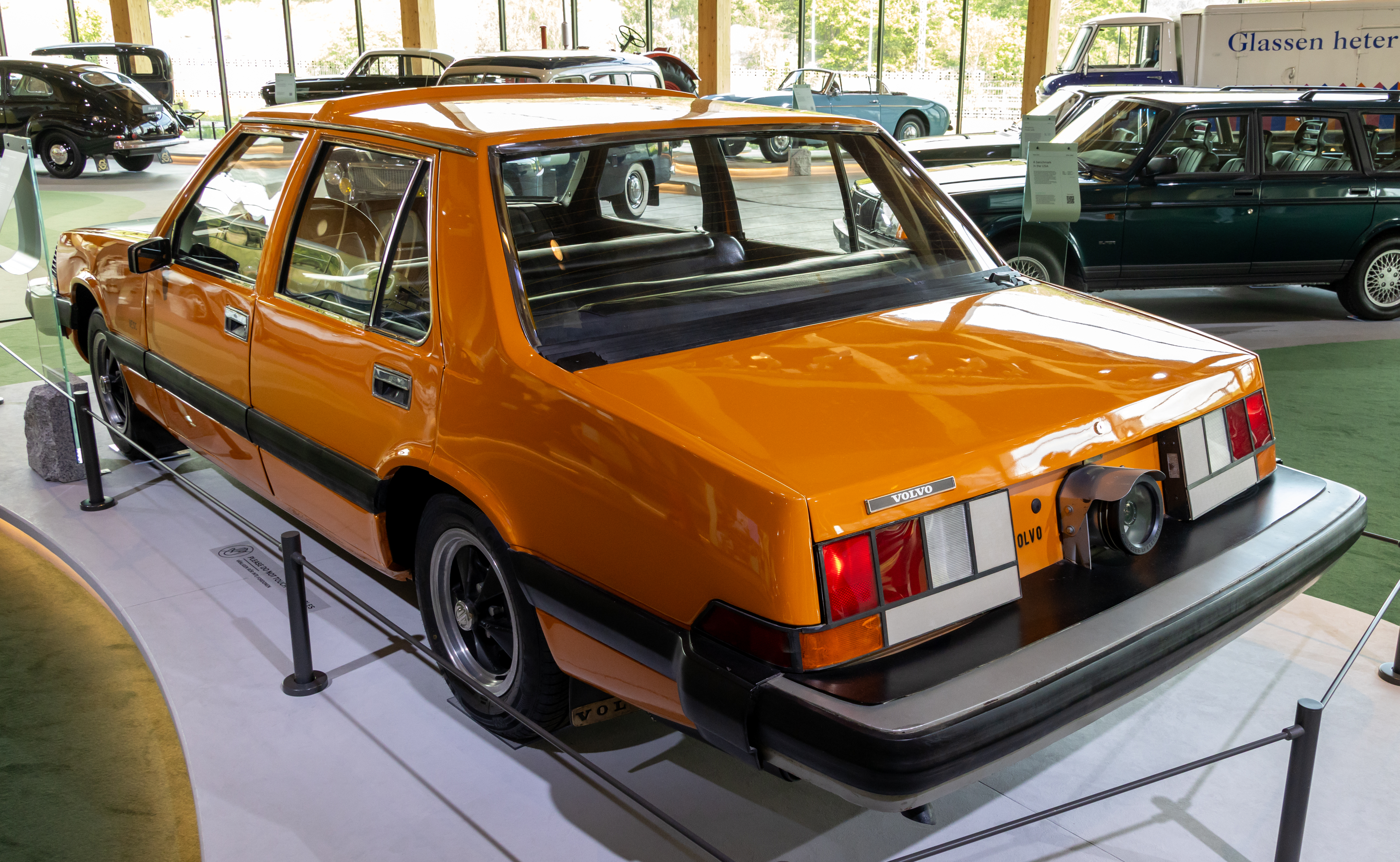
Rear view

The 5,520 mm (217 in) long car was designed for surviving a frontal collision at 80 km/h (50 mph): The front bumper area was made particularly long; in the case of a collision, the engine would be forced down under the cabin floor by a suitably shaped and reinforced firewall; a spring would pull the steering column into the dashboard (this has since become standard, but in those times it was still common for the driver to be injured getting caught between the wheel and the seat); at the back of the front seats were large cushions to protect rear seat passengers. For resilience against a side collision, the car had strong reinforcements and crumple zones in the doors. The VESC roof would not be pushed in more than 75 mm in an inverted 2.4 m fall. The headrests were folded into the seats and would automatically extend in a collision.

Other features of the Volvo VESC were anti-lock brakes, back-up warning signal, integrated roll cage, three-point seatbelts which pulled tight during a crash, front and rear airbags, headlamp washers and wipers, automatic ride height control, center mounted fuel tank, automatic fuel shutoff mechanism, warning lights in the doors and an early rear-view camera provided by Mitsubishi Electric that used a 6.5-mm Cosmicar lens mounted between the rear taillights sending footage to a television screen in the cabin.

== Outcome ==
Much of the car - especially the front - heavily influenced the upcoming 200 series, launched in 1974.

A Volvo VESC is on display at the Volvo Museum in Gothenburg.
