= Perkins 4.236 =

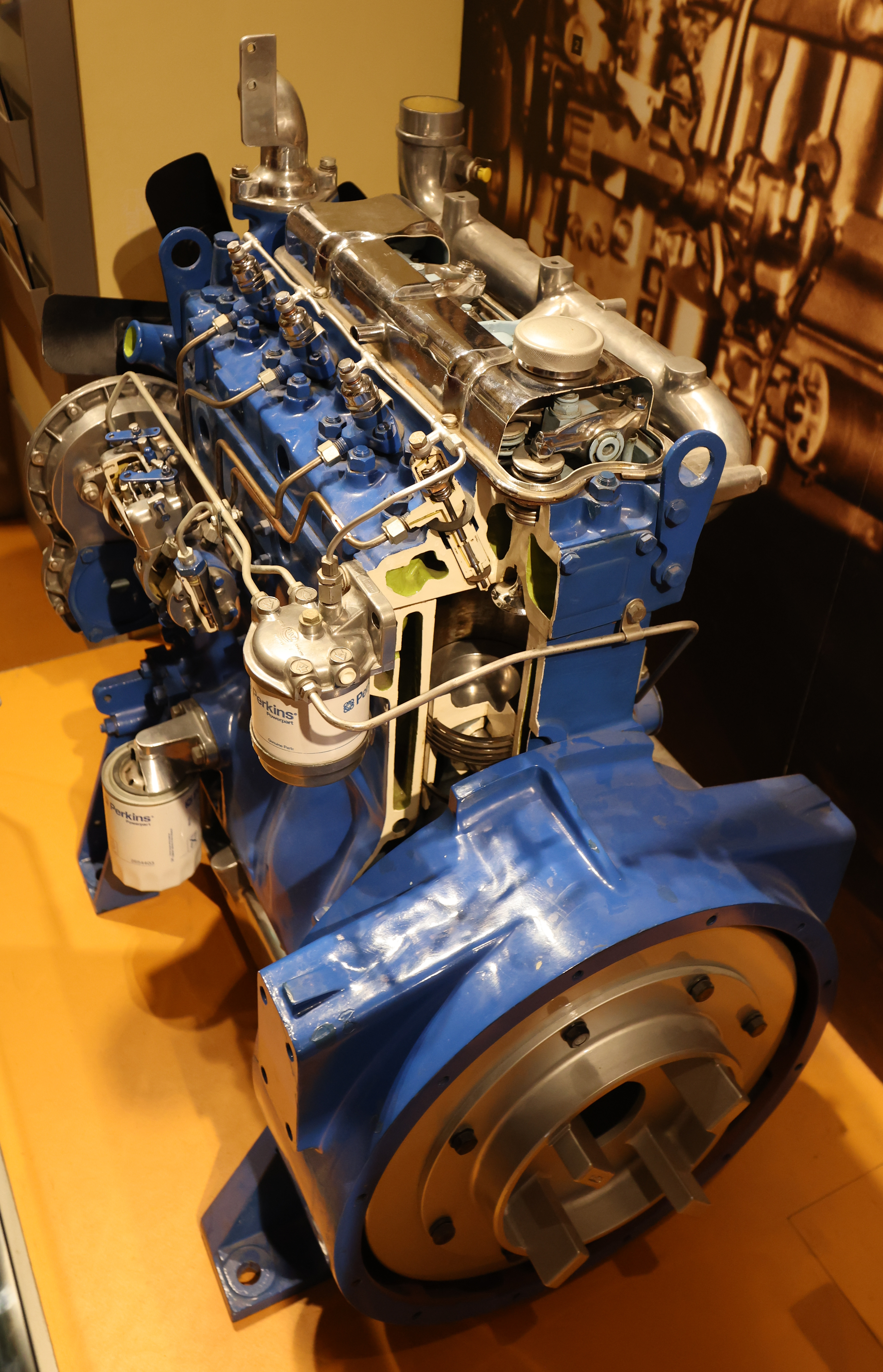
- a Perkins 4.236 diesel engine

Overview
- Manufacturer: Perkins Engines
- Also called: Perkins 4.212; Perkins 4.248; Perkins T4.38; Perkins 4.41; Perkins Q20B; Maxion S4/S4T
- Production: 1965-2000?

Layout
- Configuration: Straight-4; Straight-6
- Displacement: 4.212: 212.3 cu in (3,479 cc); 4.236: 235.9 cu in (3,865 cc); 4.248: 248.2 cu in (4,068 cc); 6.306: 305.4 cu in (5,004 cc); 6.354: 353.8 cu in (5,798 cc); 6.372: 372.3 cu in (6,101 cc)
- Cylinder bore: 6.306: 3.6 in (91.44 mm); 3 7/8 in (98.43 mm); 4.248/6.372: 3.975 in (100.97 mm)
- Piston stroke: 4.212: 4.5 in (114.30 mm); 5 in (127.00 mm)

RPM range
- Idle speed: 750
- Max. engine speed: 2000

Combustion
- Turbocharger: T38
- Management: Lucas
- Fuel type: Diesel
- Cooling system: Water-cooled

Output
- Power output: 67–157 PS (49–115 kW; 66–155 bhp) ASE (DIN)

The Perkins 4.236 is a diesel engine manufactured by Perkins Engines. First produced in 1964, over 70,000 were produced in the first three years, and production increased to 60,000 units per annum. The engine was both innovative (using direct injection) and reliable, becoming a worldwide sales success over several decades. It was also built in several other displacements, as well as in six-cylinder form (6.354, 6.372).

The Perkins 4.236 is rated at 67 PS (49 kW; 66 bhp) ASE (DIN), and is widely used in Massey Ferguson tractors, as well as other well-known industrial and agricultural machines, e.g. Clark, Manitou, JCB, Landini and Vermeer.

== The designation "4.236" ==
The designation 4.236 arose as follows: "4" represents four cylinders, "236" represents 236 cubic inches (3.9 L), which is the total displacement of the engine. This logic can be used for most of Perkins engine designations. Bore and stroke 3 7/8 in (98.4 mm) × 5 in (127.0 mm), for an overall displacement of 235.9 cu in (3.9 L; 3,865 cc). Late in the production run, the turbocharged T4.236 was renamed T4.38 to be in line with Perkins' revised naming system.

== Derivatives ==
The 4.248, a version bored out by 0.1 inches (2.54 mm) with a resulting displacement of 248.2 cu in (4.1 L; 4,068 cc) also appeared. This remained in production until when Perkins changed their naming system, at which time the engine got the name 4.41 (for four cylinders, 4.1 litres displacement).

A short-stroke variant called the 4.212 was also developed; its 4.5 inches (114.3 mm) made for a displacement of 212.3 cu in (3.5 L; 3,479 cc). A version of this engine, using the bigger bore of the 4.248 and displacing 3,661 cc (223.4 cu in), was planned and received a model number (LC), but never entered production.

=== Six-cylinder variants ===
The 6.354 and 6.372 six-cylinder engines had the same internal dimensions as the 4.236 and 4.248 respectively. The 6.372 produces 112 horsepower in industrial form. The T6.3724 is the turbocharged version of the above engine. The ".4" at the end of the nomenclature, indicates a later, improved series engine. There was also a T6.3544, with a maximum power output of 155 hp (116 kW). There was also a narrow-bore variant built between 1965 and 1975, the 6.306, displacing 5.0 L (305.4 cu in; 5,004 cc).

== Applications ==
The Massey Ferguson tractors that were originally fitted with this engine are: 168S, 175, 175S, (174 - Romanian model). Later came the 261, 265, 275, 365, 375, 384S. Volvo Trucks used this engine in their Snabbe and Trygge trucks beginning in 1967; they called it the D39.

Defunct American car manufacturer Checker Motors Corporation of Kalamazoo, Michigan, offered the 4.236 as an option in their Checker Marathon, for the 1969 model year only.

Also the Dodge 50 Series received this engine, from July 1979 until July 1987 as the 4.236 and also between July 1986 and July 1987 in turbocharged T38-specification. It was also fitted as an option for Renault 50 Series vehicles. In Brazil, the locally developed Puma trucks received the Perkins 4.236 engine, with a maximum of 82 PS (60 kW; 81 bhp) DIN. Brazilian versions of the Chevrolet C/K series also relied on the Perkins 4.236 throughout the 80's as its only Diesel option.

The Vermeer BC1250 brush chipper used this engine until the BC1250A replaced it. The BC1250A used the turbocharged version of the same engine.

In South Korea, Hyundai Motor Company produced this engine under license by Perkins between 1977 and 1981, calling it the HD4236. They installed it into their Hyundai Bison Truck (HD3000, HD5000).

Long-term liveaboard sailors Bill & Laurel Cooper installed three Perkins 4.236 engines with three screws and stern gear into their 88' schooner-rigged Dutch barge, Hosanna. Having three engines (using just one on a calm canal, but engaging the other two in fast rivers or for manoeuvering) was still cheaper than having an equivalent single engine such as a Cummins or Volvo.

== Specification ==
- Idle speed: 750 rpm, Rated speed: 2,000 rpm, Max. torque at 1,300 rpm
- Early models were fitted with Lucas M50 electric starter and Lucas dynamo charger.

== See also ==
- List of Perkins engines
