= Volvo Philip =

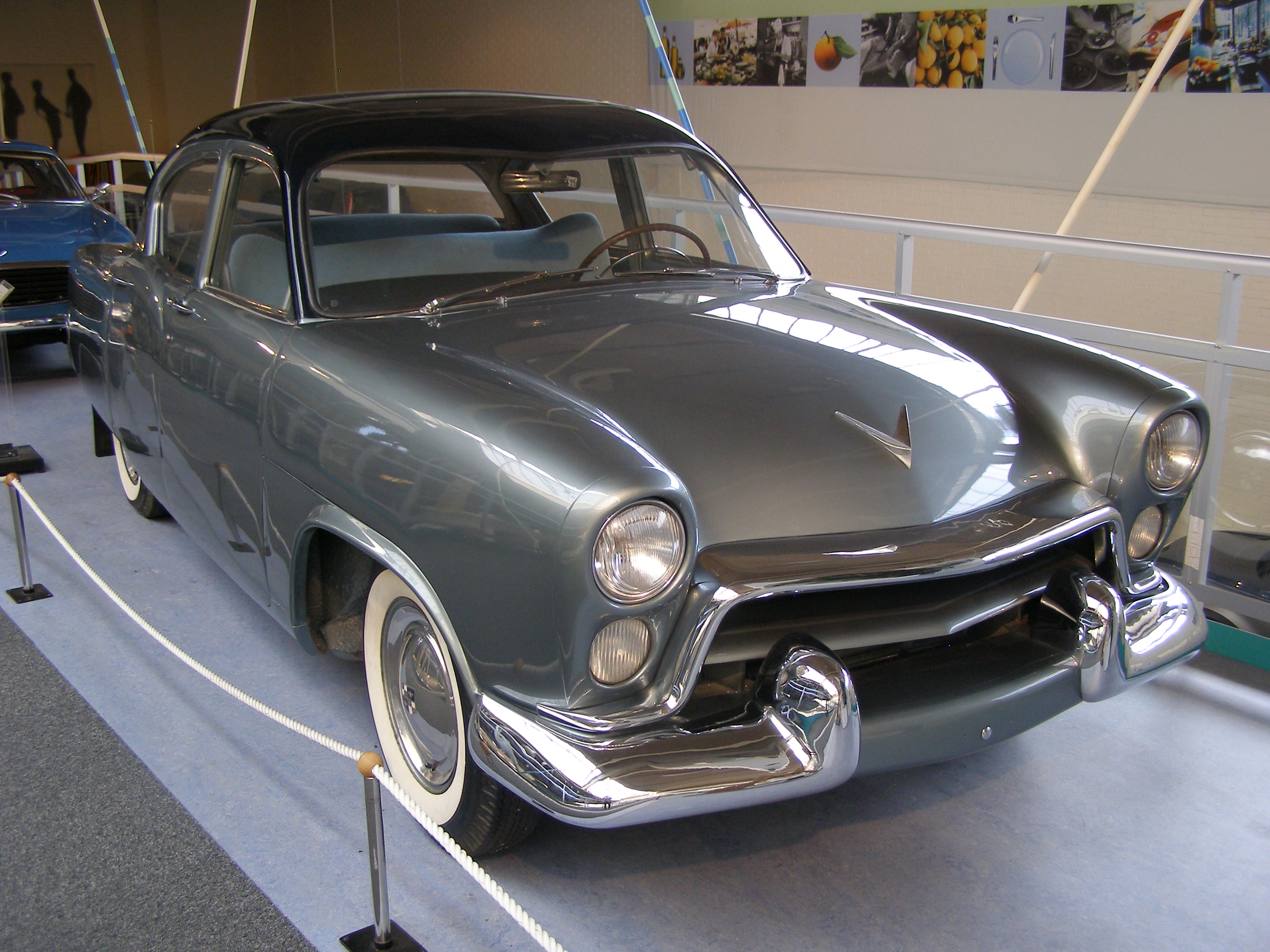
- Volvo Philip at the Volvo Museum (April 2014)

Overview
- Manufacturer: Volvo Cars
- Production: 1952
- Designer: Jan Wilsgaard

Body and chassis
- Body style: 4-door sedan
- Layout: FR layout

Powertrain
- Engine: 3.6 L B8B V8

The Volvo Philip was a concept car built by Volvo in 1952. It was designed especially for the United States market, and so was fitted with a prototype V8 engine called the B8B, which produced 120 hp (89 kW) at 4000 rpm along with whitewall tires and a hint of tailfins.

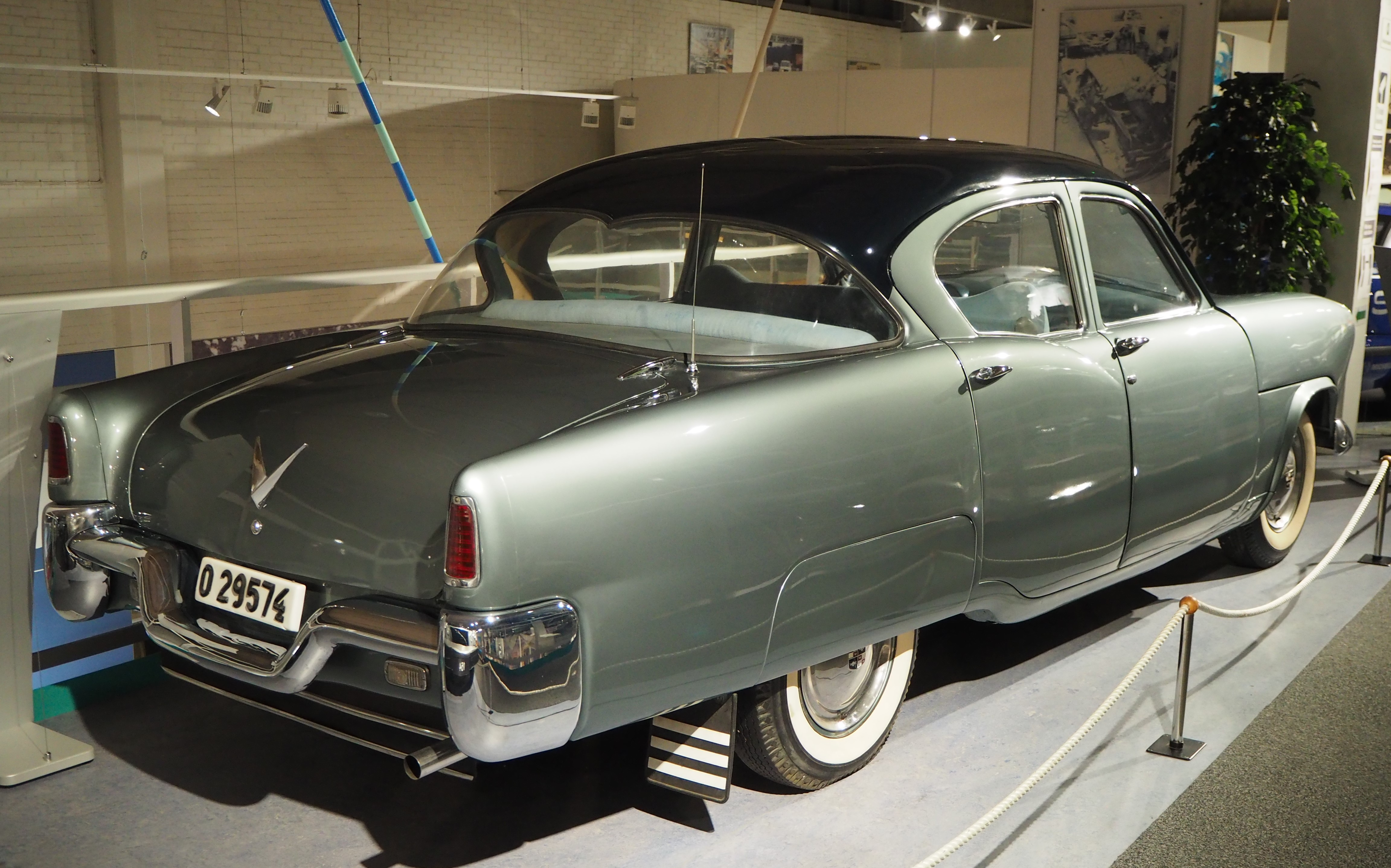
Volvo Philip rear

The design was inspired by American cars and was similar to the 1951 Kaiser. The designer was Jan Wilsgaard, who also designed the Volvo Amazon. However, it was cancelled by the board and never reached production, with only one car being made. That car was used for several years by the board at Bolinder-Munktell in Eskilstuna and is now preserved at the Volvo Museum in Gothenburg.

This vehicle was hand built under extreme secrecy and was subjected to thorough testing. However, the V8 engine entered production in 1956 and was used for a truck, the Volvo Snabbe, as well as for boats. It was known for being strong and reliable but also for high fuel consumption. Production of the engine had ceased by 1973.
