= Perkins 6.247 =

The Perkins 6.247 is a diesel engine designed by Perkins Engines in the mid-1970s, intended for light duty commercial vehicles with lower NVH than contemporary offerings. It is a six-cylinder variant of the Perkins 4.165. It was built under licence by Mazda as the ZB. It was fitted to the Ford Australia F100 series light trucks for a short period from the late 1970s to the early 1980s; in the United Kingdom it was installed in the Dodge 50 Series. This engine was later revised and renamed the Mazda T4100 and fitted to the Mazda 3- and 4-tonne trucks.

Bore and stroke are 92.0 mm × 101.6 mm (3.62 in × 4.00 in) for an overall displacement of 4.1 L (4,052 cc; 247.3 cu in). When installed in the Dodge 50, this engine produces 93 hp (69 kW) and 160 lb⋅ft (217 N⋅m).

== See also ==
- List of Perkins engines
