= World of Volvo =

Coordinates: 57.6896°N 11.9978°E

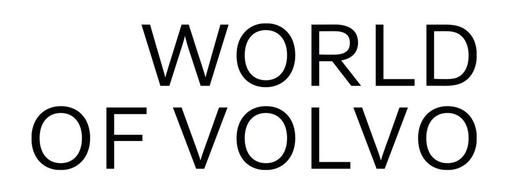

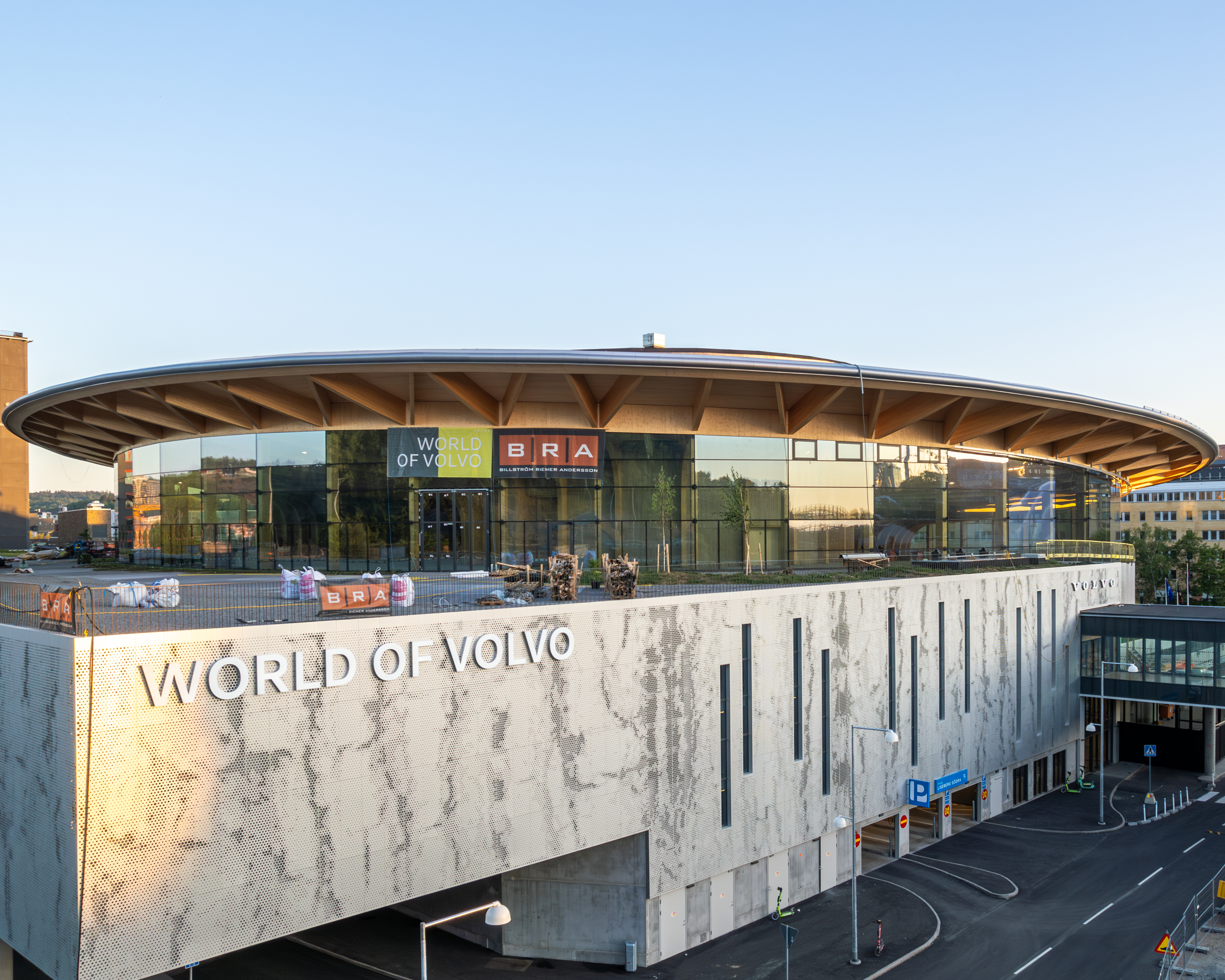
- Former name: Volvo Museum (Predecessor)
- Established: April 2024
- Location: Gothenburg, Sweden
- Type: Automotive museum and Experience centre
- Founders: Volvo Cars, Volvo Group
- Architect: Henning Larsen
- Public transit access: Tram: Liseberg Södra or Almedal
- Website: www.worldofvolvo.com

World of Volvo is an automotive museum and experience centre in Gothenburg, Sweden, jointly owned by Volvo Cars and Volvo Group. Opened in April 2024, it serves as a cultural and exhibition space for Volvo's brand and heritage. World of Volvo opened after the former Volvo Museum closed in December 2023.

== History ==
=== Former Volvo Museum ===
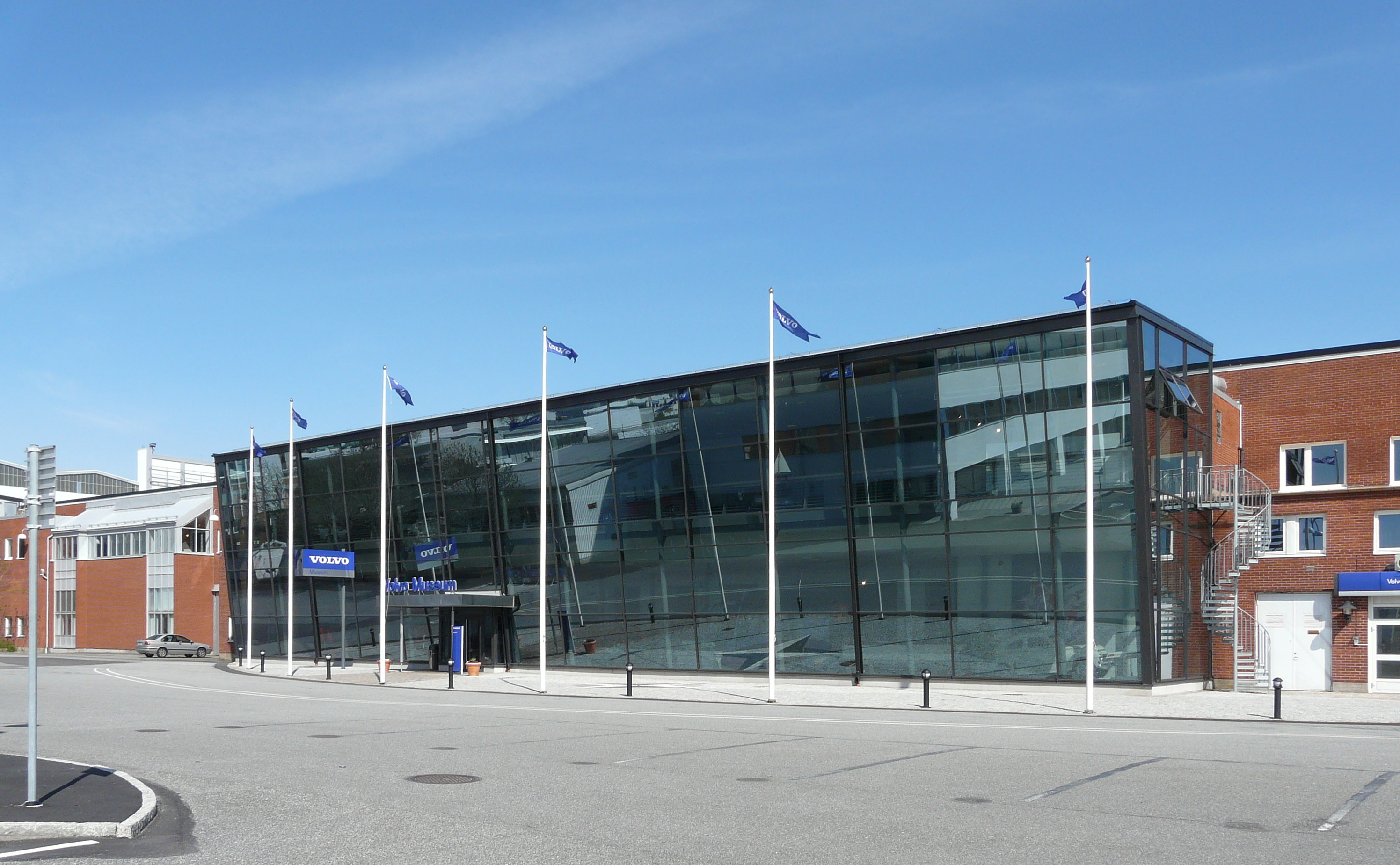
Original Volvo Museum in Arendal

The original museum opened in 1995 and was located in the area of Arendal on Hisingen island, approximately 10 km west of central Gothenburg. Originally started as the project of a Volvo factory employee, the museum was housed in a complex of industrial buildings near Volvo’s factory. Owned by Volvo Cars and Volvo Group, it showcased Volvo's development from its founding in 1927 to modern times, displaying a range of vehicles, engines, and prototypes. The museum also featured historical artefacts, including the shared desk of company founders Assar Gabrielsson and Gustaf Larson.

Exhibitions included Volvo’s early production models, including the Volvo ÖV 4, as well as notable prototypes such as the Volvo Philip and Volvo VESC. The museum also displayed Volvo Aero, Volvo Penta, and Volvo Ocean Race designs. The museum was located near to the Arendal Cruise Terminal, which accounted for a fairly large share of visitors. The Volvo Museum remained open to visitors until December 2023.

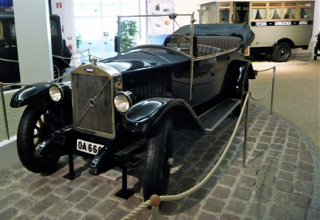
Volvo ÖV4

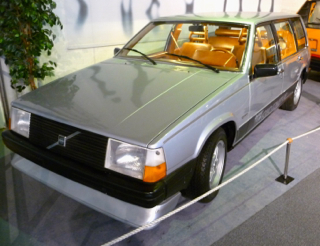
Volvo VCC

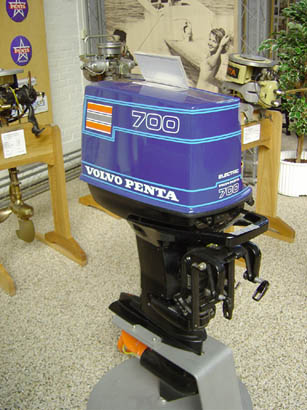
Volvo Penta

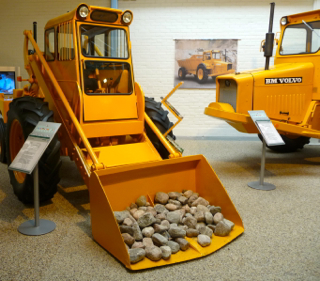
Volvo BM-fordon

=== Establishment and inauguration ===
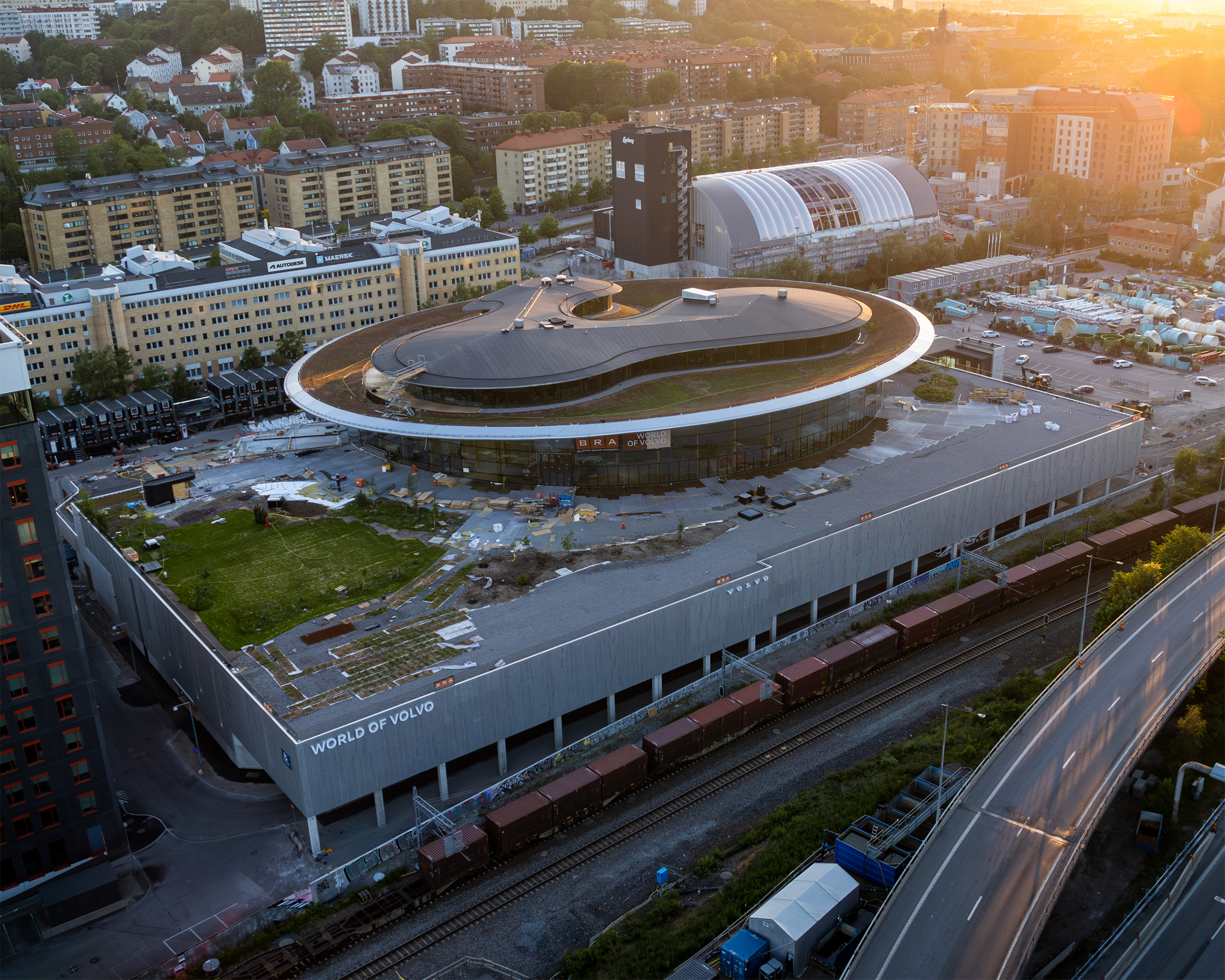
Building construction in 2023

In the late 2010s, Volvo announced its ambition to create a new public facility located in central Gothenburg. In January 2020, the European Commission approved the plans by Volvo Cars and AB Volvo for what was then described as an "experience park". Later that year, Volvo confirmed that the new facility, named World of Volvo, would replace the Volvo Museum in Arendal.

Positioned in Gothenburg’s events district near Liseberg, the facility aimed to attract a larger audience than the previous museum, offering interactive exhibitions, conferences, and cultural events in addition to vehicle displays.

Designed by Danish architecture firm Henning Larsen, construction of the 22,000-square-metre (240,000 sq ft) building began in early 2022, with materials sourced from Sweden and Austria. The original Volvo Museum closed December 2023, in preparation for exhibits to be moved to the new centre. The new centre was completed in early 2024. On 14 April 2024, Volvo’s 97th anniversary, the centre was inaugurated.

== The building ==
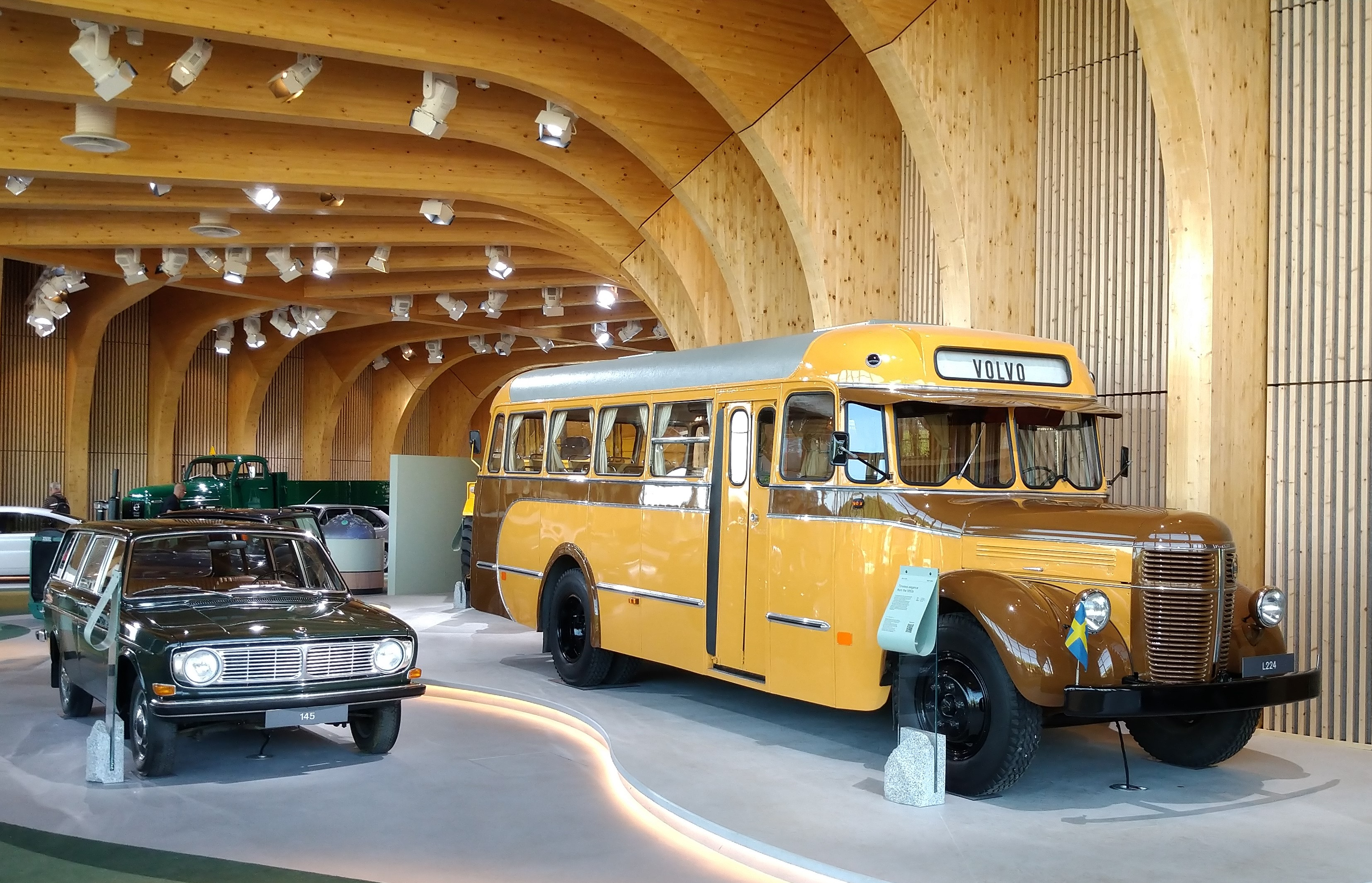
Wooden interior of the building

World of Volvo is housed in a 22,500-square-metre structure, designed by the Danish architecture firm Henning Larsen Architects. The upper building is constructed primarily from glulam and cross-laminated timber (CLT) and follows a circular design with three central timber columns that fan outwards to support the roof. These are intended to resemble tree trunks and to reflect the Swedish freedom-to-roam concept of Allemansrätten. The lower building incorporates a five-story car park.

The structure includes exhibition halls, event spaces, and a central staircase with integrated seating that leads to an upper level containing a restaurant, bar, and conference facilities. The circular roof, partially covered with vegetation, is accessible to visitors. The building's foundation work was challenging as the site, previously occupied by Saab’s gearbox factory, consisted of water-saturated clay. Excavation involved removing 60,000 cubic meters of clay.

The design process incorporated computational parametric modelling. The main contractor for the project was BRA Bygg, with Wiehag in Austria responsible for timber fabrication and Optima Engineering overseeing structural engineering. Construction began in 2022, and the building was completed in early 2024.

== Exhibitions and facilities ==
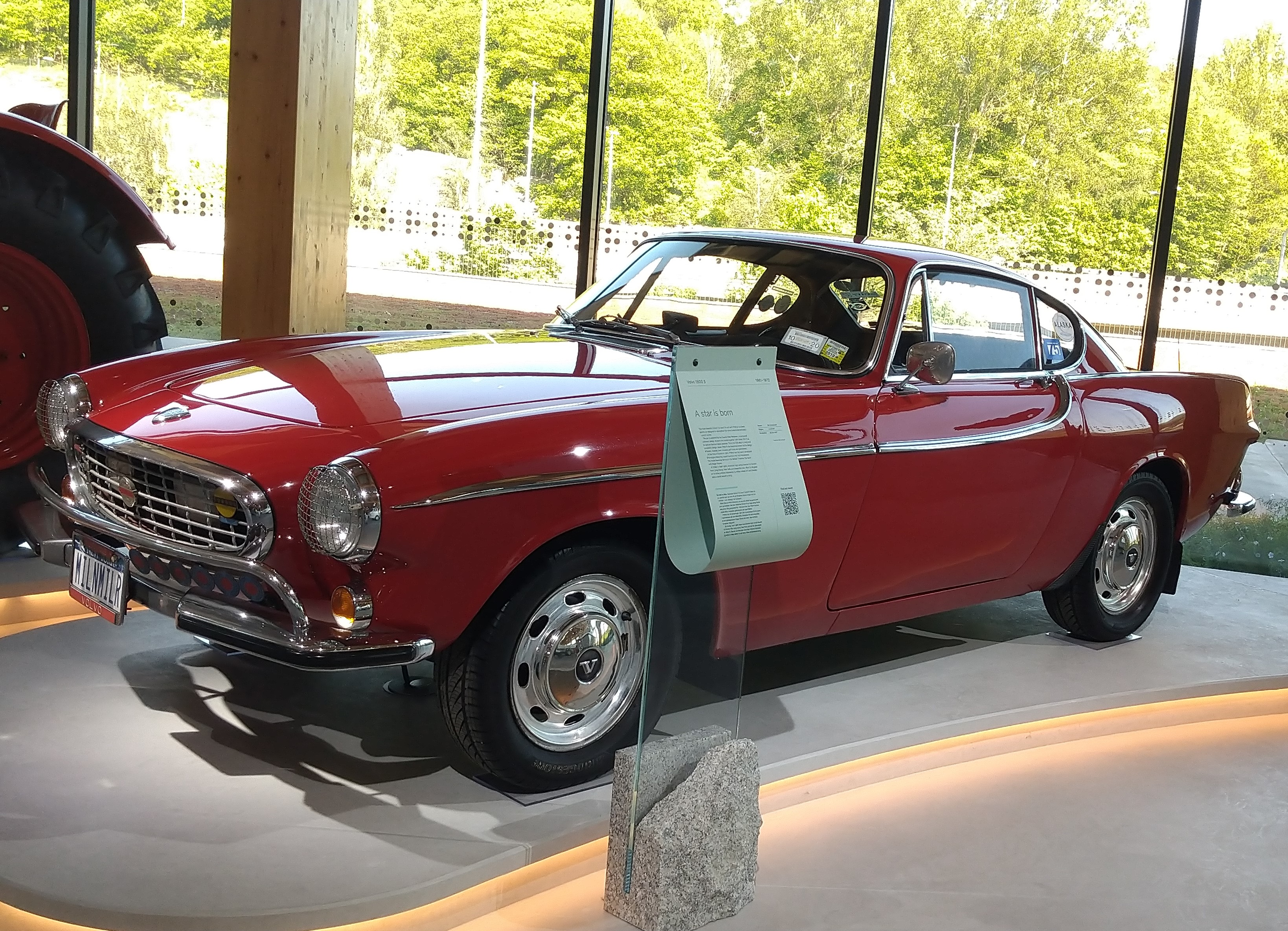
Irv Gordon's Volvo P1800

World of Volvo hosts permanent and temporary exhibitions on various aspects of the brand's history, including its automotive innovations and contributions to transport safety. It also features interactive displays and multimedia installations that explore the company’s role in mobility.

Some exhibits include:

- Volvo Experimental Safety Car (VESC): A 1970s concept car that introduced features like anti-lock brakes, airbags, and one of the world's first reversing cameras.
- Volvo White Bus: A historically significant vehicle used by the Swedish Red Cross in Nazi Germany in 1945 to rescue prisoners from Nazi concentration camps.
- World’s Highest-Mileage Car: A Volvo P1800 that covered 3.2 million miles, originally owned by American schoolteacher Irv Gordon.
- ‘Adventure in Distractville’ Simulator: A driving experience designed to educate visitors about the dangers of distracted driving.

In addition to its exhibitions, the centre functions as a venue for corporate and cultural events, with conference spaces and public areas designed for lectures, workshops, and industry gatherings. The centre also includes a restaurant.
