= Volvo B36 engine =

V8 engine

Volvo B36

Overview
- Manufacturer: Volvo
- Also called: B8B; C8B
- Production: 1956–1966

Layout
- Configuration: V8
- Displacement: 3,559 cc (217.2 cu in)
- Cylinder bore: 84.14 mm (3.31 in)
- Piston stroke: 80 mm (3.15 in)
- Cylinder block material: Cast iron
- Cylinder head material: Cast iron
- Valvetrain: OHV
- Compression ratio: 7.6:1

RPM range
- Idle speed: 400–500 rpm

Combustion
- Fuel system: Single 2-bbl Carter carburettor
- Fuel type: Petrol
- Oil system: Wet sump
- Cooling system: Water-cooled

Output
- Power output: 120 hp (89.5 kW) at 4000 rpm
- Torque output: 192 lb⋅ft (260 N⋅m) at 2200 rpm

Dimensions
- Dry weight: 235 kg (518.1 lb)

The Volvo B36 is a petrol V8 automobile engine designed and built by Volvo. It first appeared in a concept car in 1952, and was later used in Volvo's truck line from 1956 to 1966.

== History ==
In 1952 Volvo unveiled a concept car called the Volvo Philip. This American-style sedan was powered by a newly designed prototype V8 engine called the B8B. The Philip did not go into production, but its V8 engine, redesigned and renamed the B36, did a few years later, when it appeared in the Volvo Snabbe and Trygge trucks.

The V8 was produced by Volvo in their facilities in Gothenburg and Skövde. The engine's full name was B36AV.

In March 1958, shortly after the end of production of the large PV830 model, Volvo started work on internal Project 358. The project's goal was to develop a replacement for that earlier, inline-six powered car using the V8 engine from the Philip showcar. This project failed to reach production.

Volvo revisited the idea of a V8-powered passenger car again later with the Volvo Amazon. For the first exercise, called "Project Victor", five copies of a revised B36 called the C8B were built. These engines had a displacement of just 2.5 litres, but to fit them into the Amazon engine bay the sheet metal had to be modified. When the project was cancelled the engines were essentially abandoned in the factory at Skövde. Another project, called Amazon Brede (Wide Amazon), installed a C8B in an Amazon made by welding together two separate cars, widening the whole structure by 120 mm (4.7 in). The Amazon Brede project remained a one-off.

Versions of the B36 were used in products from Volvo's Penta marine propulsion division. The MB36A was available from 1956 to 1965 and produced 127 hp (94.7 kW), and the MB36B version was sold from 1964 to 1965 and produced 180 hp (134.2 kW). The B36 was also used in the Penta AQ180.

== Technical features ==
The B36 is a 4-stroke V8 with a 90° angle between the cylinder banks. The engine block and cylinder heads are made of cast iron. The cylinder firing order is: 1-8-4-3-6-5-7-2.

Cylinder bore diameter is 84.14 mm (3.31 in) and the piston stroke is 80 mm (3.1 in), for a total displacement of 3,559 cc (217.2 cu in). The original compression ratio is 7.6:1. Power and torque output are 120 hp (89.5 kW) at 4000 rpm and 191.8 lb⋅ft (260 N⋅m) at 2200 rpm respectively. The engine weighs 235 kg (518.1 lb). The intake manifold and a two barrel Carter carburetor are centrally located between the cylinder banks.

Because the B36 had exactly the same bore and stroke dimensions as the later B18 and the two engines also have some valve-train parts in common, some suggest that the B18 is one-half of the B36 V8. Significant differences between the B36 and the B18 include different crank lengths and piston heights. Also, while the V8 engine has crossflow cylinder heads, the four cylinder has a reverse-flow cylinder head. Due to these differences others assert that the engines are for the most part separate designs.
