= Volvo Snabbe =

Volvo Snabbe and Trygge
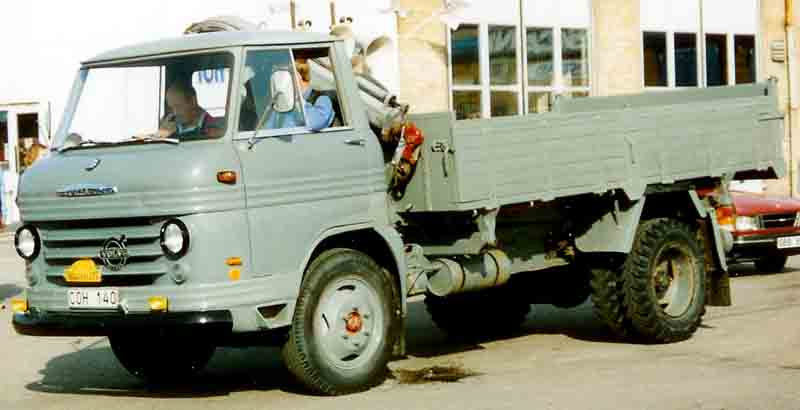

Overview
- Manufacturer: Volvo Trucks
- Also called: Volvo L420/430; Volvo F82/83; Volvo F82S/83S
- Production: 1956–1975; approx. 25,000 produced
- Designer: Helmer Petterson

Body and chassis
- Class: Truck

Powertrain
- Engine: 3.6 L B36 V8 (1956-1966); 3.6 L D36 I4 diesel (1963–1967); 3.9 L D39 I4 diesel (1967–1975)
- Transmission: 4/5 speed manual

Dimensions
- Curb weight: 5,600–8,400 kg (12,345.9–18,518.8 lb) (gross weight)

Chronology
- Predecessor: Volvo L340
- Successor: Volvo F4

The Volvo Snabbe and Trygge was a series of light trucks produced by Swedish automaker Volvo between 1956 and 1975.

== Volvo L420 Snabbe ==
Volvo introduced its first forward control truck L420 Snabbe ("Fast") at the end of 1956. It had a payload of approx. 3 tonnes. The truck's V8 engine had been developed by Volvo for a planned luxury automobile called Volvo Philip in the early 1950s.

A V8 engine in the lightweight vehicle meant impressive performance for a truck. The downside was the gruesome fuel consumption and from 1964 onwards the Snabbe was offered with a diesel engine as an alternative.

== Volvo L430 Trygge ==
In early 1957 the program was supplemented with the larger L430 Trygge ("Safe"). With sturdier chassis and suspension the payload was increased to approx. 5 tonnes. From 1963 onwards the Trygge was offered with a more economical diesel engine as an alternative. Since Volvo didn't have the resources to develop an engine of their own, they chose to buy the 3.6-litre "Dorset" tractor engine from Ford. With only 65 PS (48 kW), performance was rather mundane.

== Volvo F82/F83 ==
Volvo introduced its "System 8" in 1965. Changes for the smallest trucks were restricted to new names. Snabbe became F82 and Trygge became F83. Production of the B36 V8 engine halted in 1966, and thus disappeared the last petrol engine Volvo truck. In 1967 Volvo replaced the Ford diesel with the more powerful Perkins 4.236 from Perkins Engines; Volvo called it the D39.

1972 saw the last modernization of the model series. The engine was moved forward in the chassis to provide better space inside the cab. The main exterior change was a new radiator grille in black plastic. The trucks were now called F82S and F83S respectively.

== Engines ==
| Model | Year | Engine | Displacement | Power | Type |
|---|---|---|---|---|---|
| L420-430 | 1956–66 | B36: V8 ohv | 3,559 cc (217.2 cu in) | 120 PS (88 kW) | Petrol engine |
| L425-435 | 1963–67 | D36: I4 ohv | 3,610 cc (220.3 cu in) | 65 PS (48 kW) | Diesel engine |
| F82-83 | 1967–75 | D39: I4 ohv | 3,865 cc (235.9 cu in) | 80 PS (59 kW) | Diesel engine |
