= Glasspar G2 =

Sports car body now extinct

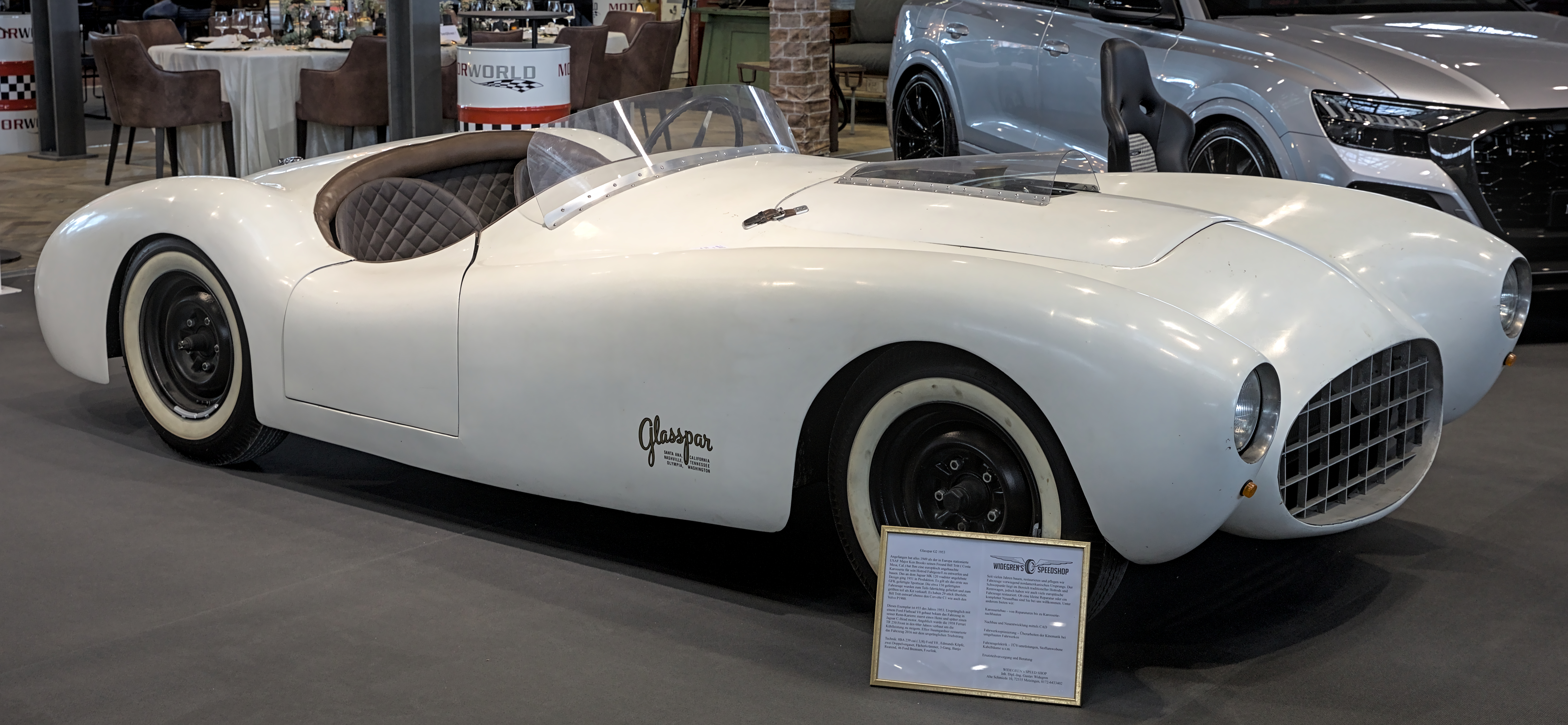

Overview
- Manufacturer: Glasspar
- Production: 1950–1953

Body and chassis
- Class: Sports car
- Body style: 2-door coupé 2-door roadster

The Glasspar G2 is a sports car first manufactured by Bill Tritt in 1949. It was the first production all-fiberglass sports car body built by an American fiberglass manufacturer. A few were built as complete cars (in limited numbers) but most were offered as a body, or body/chassis kit.

The Glasspar G2 was born in 1949 when Bill Tritt helped his friend, United States Air Force Major Ken Brooks, design a body for the hot rod Ken was building. The car consisted of a stripped down Willys Jeep chassis with a highly modified V8 engine mounted on it. Bill Tritt, at the time, was building small fiberglass boat hulls in his Costa Mesa, California, factory and he convinced Ken that fiberglass was the ideal material for the hot rod body.

Tritt made sketches of a body and, with Ken and his wife's approval, proceeded to make the body plug and mold for a low-slung, continental-style roadster. A year and a half later, with a great deal of trial and error, the body was finished, set on the chassis and christened the Brooks Boxer in mid 1951.

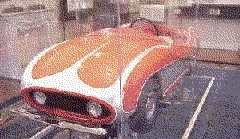
Original Autopia Fiberglass car

Bill Tritt had a keen interest in boats and cars. Before the World War II, he studied marine architecture and boat building. He worked for Douglas Aircraft's Production Planning and Illustration Departments during World War II, and by 1945 had built a number of catamaran sailboats. In 1947, John Green, a yachtsman friend, paid Tritt to design and build a racing sailboat in the twenty foot range. Fiberglass seemed the logical construction material, and Otto Bayer of Wizard Boats was enlisted as laminator. The boat was named the Green Dolphin, and four were built. This was Tritt's introduction to fiberglass-reinforced plastic (FRP). By 1947 he was building small fiberglass boats, and built the first ever fiberglass masts and spars for sailboats. This company became the Glasspar Company and moved to larger quarters in Santa Ana, California, in the early 1950s. By the mid-1950s, Glasspar was producing 15 to 20 percent of all fiberglass boats sold in the U.S.

The Brooks Boxer was an immediate success when shown at the 1951 Los Angeles Motorama along with three other early fiberglass cars: the big Lancer, the small Skorpion, and the Wasp. Only Tritt's car went on to be the first production fiberglass car. The Boxer mold was then modified and used to produce the beautiful Glasspar G2 sports car that year.

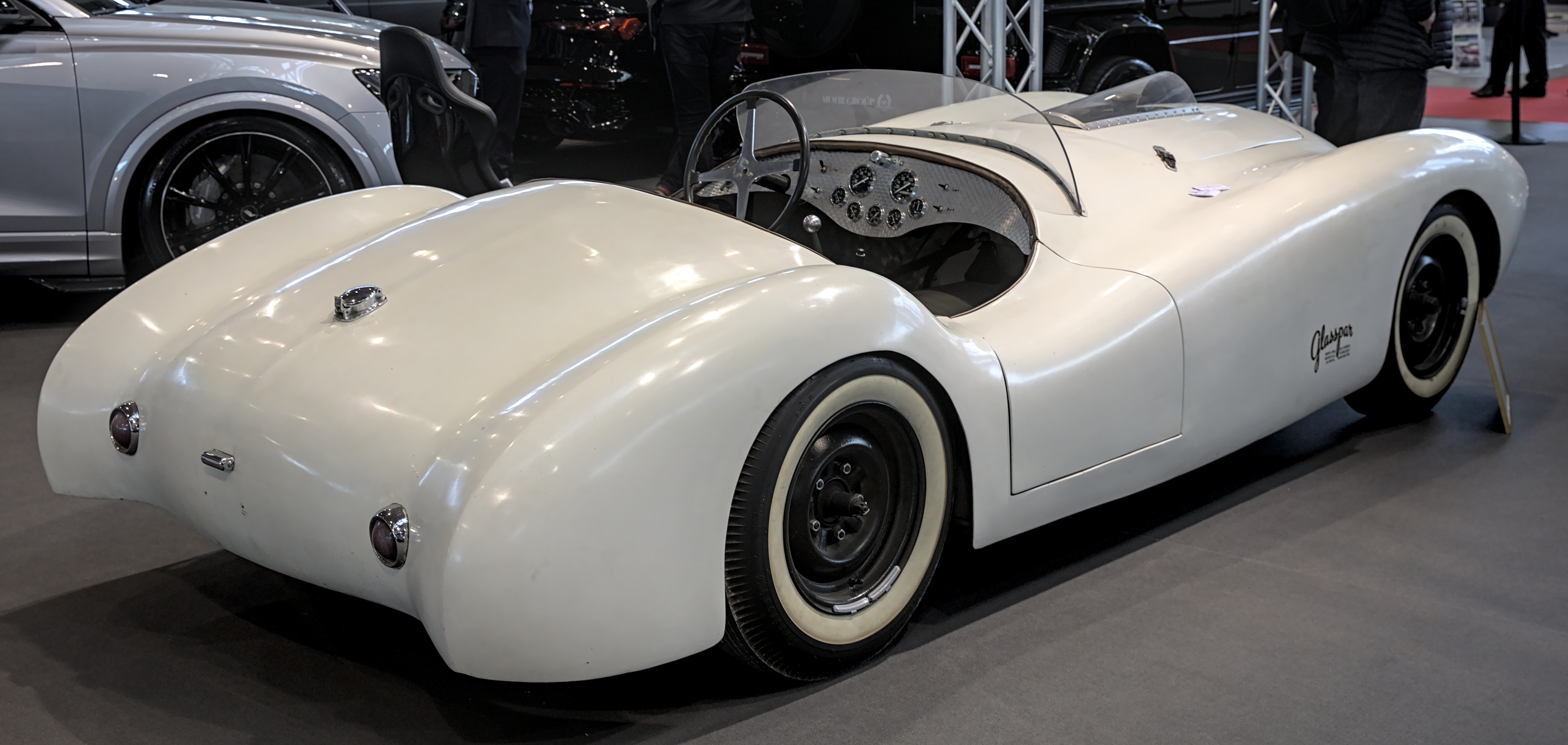
1953 Glasspar G2

About this time the Korean War was raging, and Tritt was having difficulty acquiring polyester resin for his cars and boats. The Naugatuck Chemical Company in Naugatuck, Connecticut, after seeing the Boxer, sent Glasspar plenty of Vibrin resin and an order for a G2 sports car to promote their product to the auto industry. Naugatuck's G2 was modified and named the Alembic I and was shown at the Philadelphia Plastics Exhibit in 1952. Life then featured the car in a story, as did the New York Times, the Wall Street Journal and many auto trade magazines. The Glasspar Company then went public and sold stock to raise capital.

Bill Tritt also designed and/or built fiberglass car bodies for Californian Woodill Wildfire, British Singer Car Company, Willys, Kaiser, Volvo, and Walt Disney. His last fiberglass car design was the Ascot which the Glasspar board of directors rejected in favor of staying with the core business of boat building. Tritt left Glasspar shortly afterward.

Disneyland, in Anaheim, California, was building its Autopia automobile track and commissioned Bill Tritt and Glasspar to build the fiberglass car bodies. They were small, single-seat, self-powered cars using Briggs & Stratton lawn-mower type engines with centrifugal clutches. The cars were originally designed to use aluminum wrap-around bumpers provided by Kaiser Aluminum, but later changed to the more suitable steel.
