= Woodill Wildfire =

Defunct American motor vehicle manufacturer

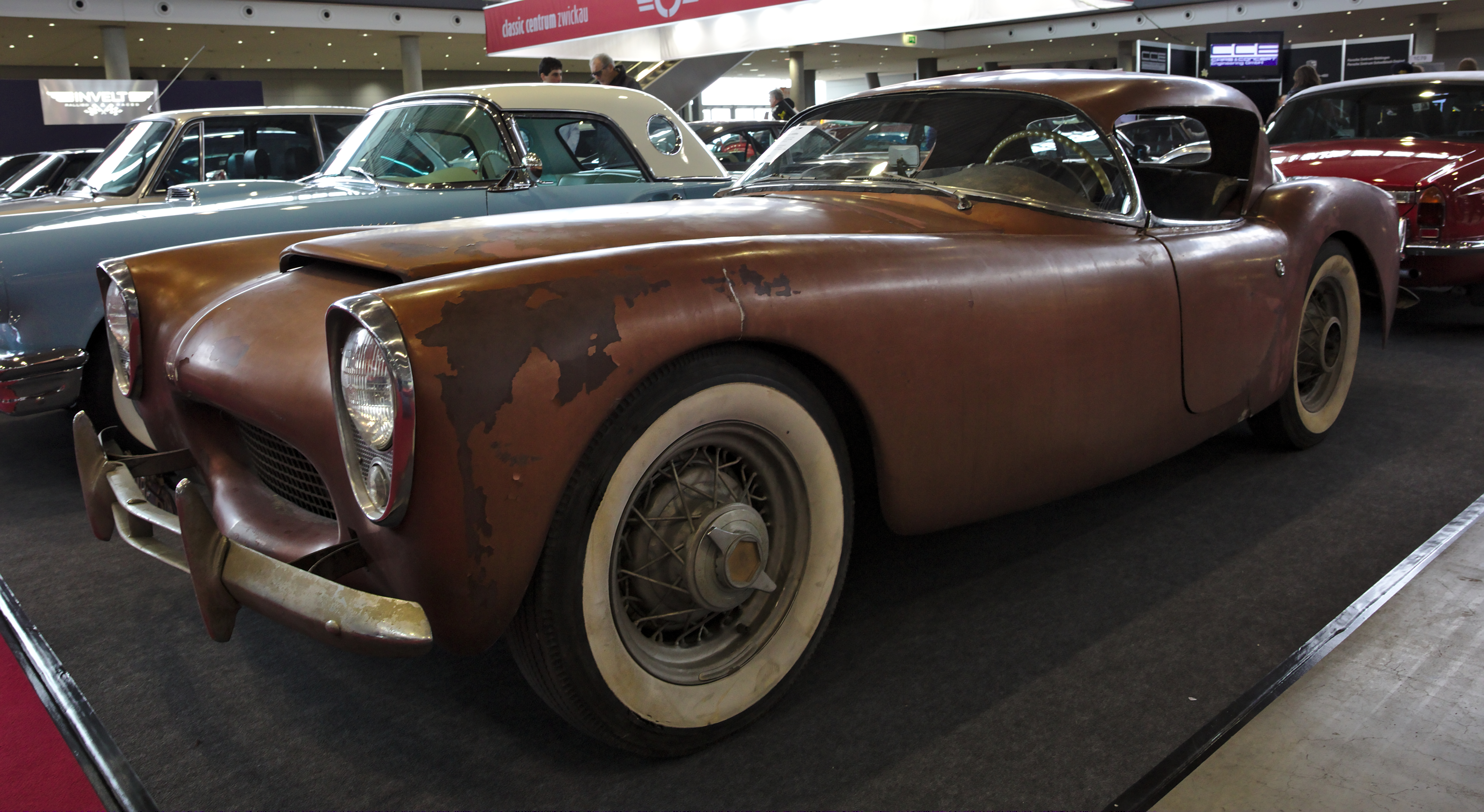

Overview
- Manufacturer: Woodill Motors
- Production: 300 produced
- Designer: Bill Tritt

Body and chassis
- Class: Sports Car
- Body style: 2-door 2-seater

Powertrain
- Engine: Willys 120 mph (193 km/h) top speed

The Woodill Wildfire was an American sports car built by Dodge and Willys dealer Blanchard Robert "Woody" Woodill from 1952 to 1958 in Downey, California. The Wildfire used a Glasspar fiberglass body and is credited with being the first complete fiberglass car available with approximately 15 produced and another 285 sold as kits. A child's version of the vehicle called the Brushfire was also available.

In September 2012 a Woodill Wildfire was featured on the Discovery Channel TV show Fast N' Loud. According to the show, theirs was one of only nine factory-built Wildfires still known to exist. The show's host sold the car to a collector for $100,500. Payment for the car consisted of ten $10,000 stacks of $100 bills and a 1934 $500 bill, the latter of which in itself is worth more than its face value.
