= Tritt =

Tritt is a surname. Notable people with the surname include:

- Bill Tritt (1917–2011), American chief executive
- Travis Tritt (born 1963), American country music singer
