= Volvo P1900 =

Volvo Sport
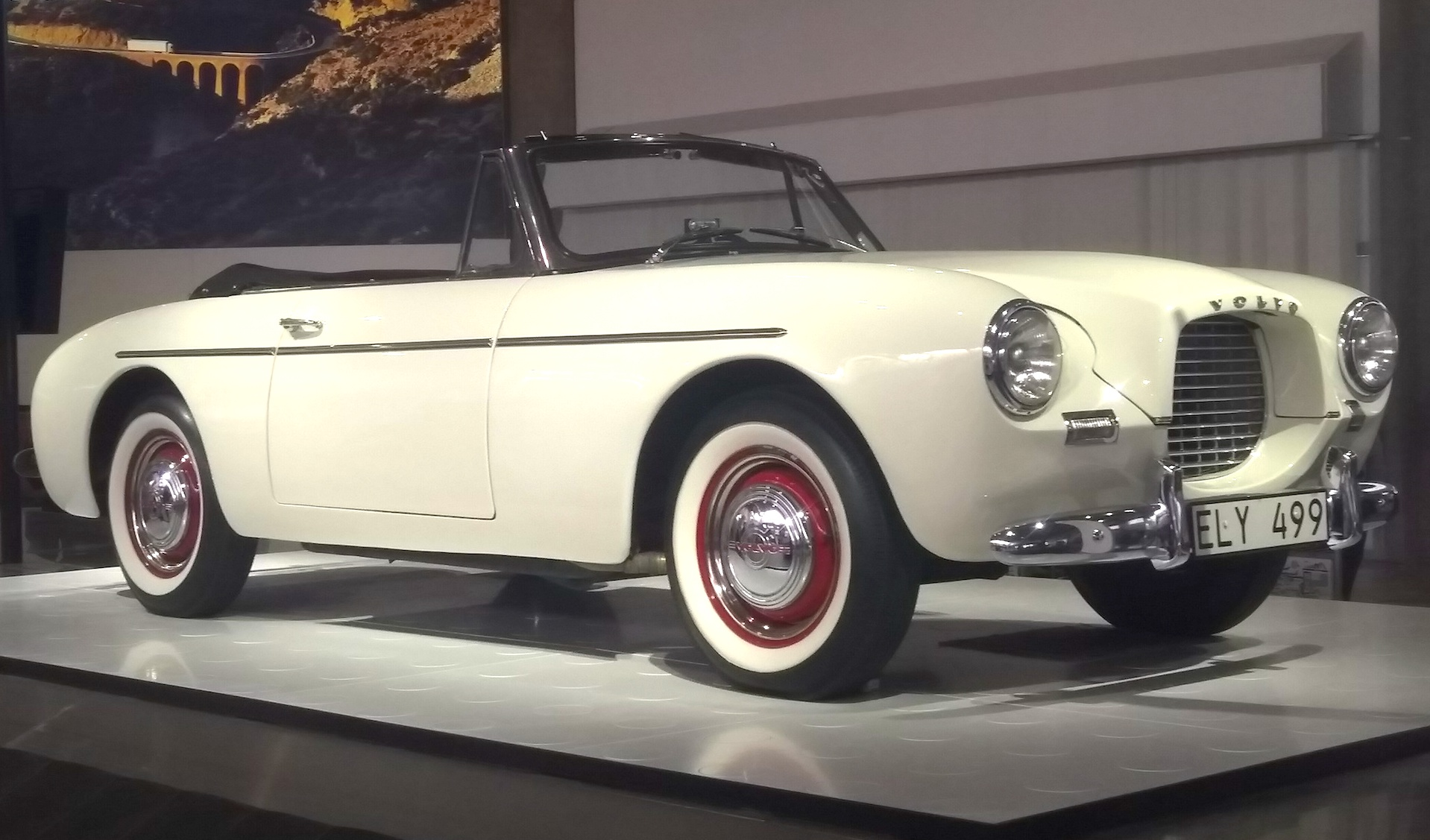
- 1956 Volvo P1900 Sport Cabriolet

Overview
- Manufacturer: Volvo Personvagnar
- Also called: Volvo P1900
- Production: 1956–1957; 68 produced
- Assembly: United States: Santa Ana, California (Glasspar); Sweden: Lundby, Gothenburg
- Designer: William Tritt (body only)

Body and chassis
- Class: Sports car (S)
- Body style: Roadster
- Layout: Front-engine, rear-wheel drive

Powertrain
- Engine: 1,414 cc (1.4 L) B14 I4
- Transmission: 3-speed manual

Dimensions
- Wheelbase: 94.5 in (2,400 mm)
- Length: 166 in (4,216 mm)

Chronology
- Successor: Volvo P1800

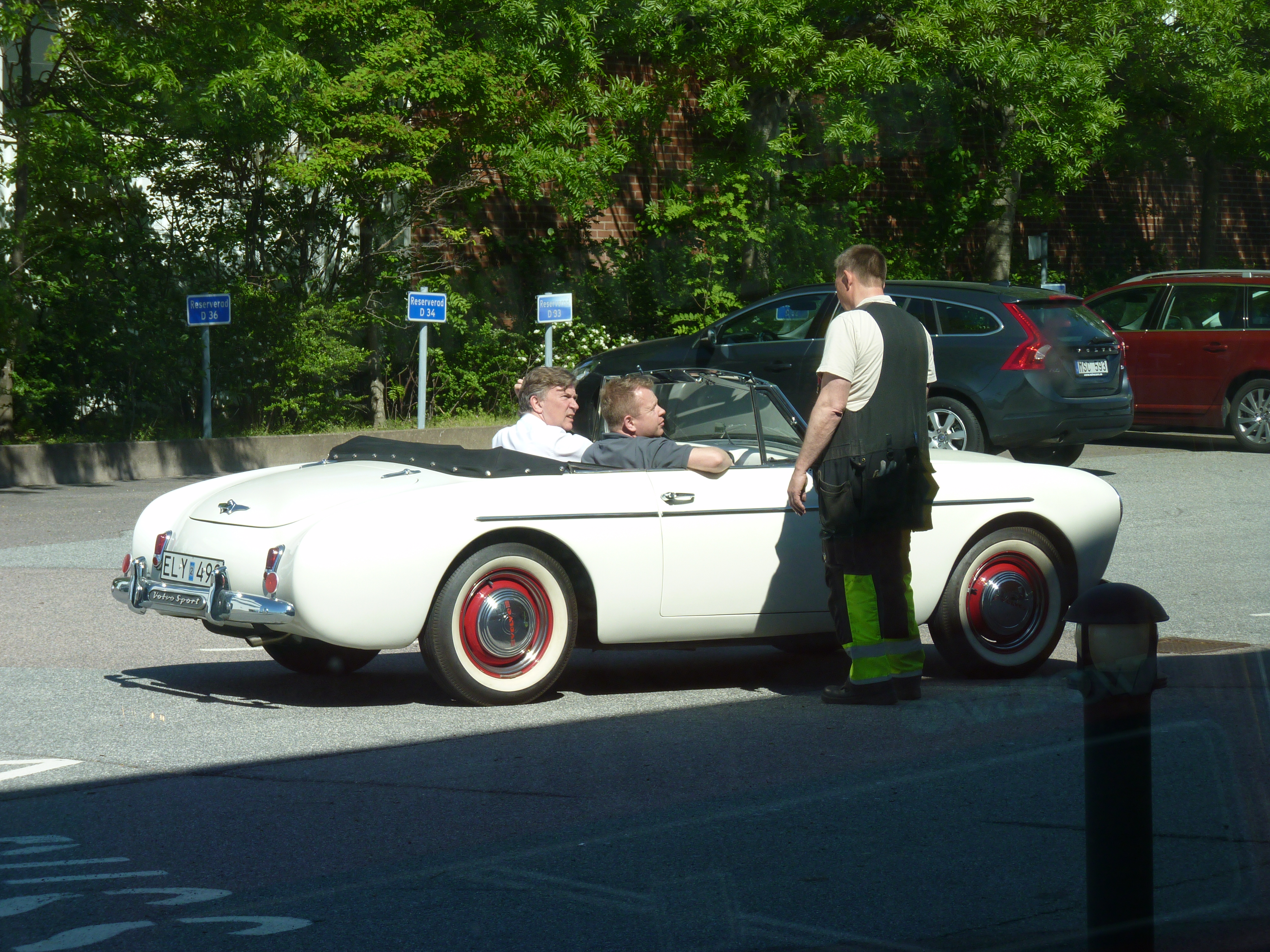
Volvo P1900 driving adjacent to Volvo museum Gothenburg Sweden

The Volvo Sport (also known as P1900) is a Swedish fiberglass-bodied roadster produced from 1956 to 1957. A total of 68 units were built, with the first 19 assembled by the Glasspar Company in California, and later by Volvo Cars.

Assar Gabrielsson, Volvo's president and founder, got the idea for the car when he saw a Chevrolet Corvette in the United States and wanted to make something similar. He approached Bill Tritt of Glasspar, an American boatbuilder in Santa Ana, California, who were pioneers in building fiberglass auto bodies from 1951 to 1957. They were was tasked with designing and tooling a fibreglass/reinforced polyester body, producing molds, building the first prototype, as well as training Volvo’s staff in how to design and manufacture fiberglass bodies.

Erik Quistgaard was appointed as development team leader. The car was built on a welded tubular-steel chassis and used an upgraded version of the Volvo PV444's 1414 cc engine producing 70 hp (52 kW) at 5,500 rpm. The engines were fitted with twin SU carburetors, as well as a different camshaft, larger intake valves and. higher compression than the PV444. Power was sent through a three-speed manual gearbox. Many other parts were taken also from the Volvo PV444.

Demand was low, and the build quality was not up to Volvo standards. Gunnar Engellau, who replaced Gabrielsson as president in 1956, took one for a drive on a holiday weekend and was dissatisfied enough that on returning to his office the following week cancelled the remaining production. He reportedly either said "I thought it would fall apart!" or "I thought the doors would fall off". The Volvo chassis design was far too flexible to accommodate a fiberglass body, and Volvo resisted recommendations by Glasspar to alter the frame to address their concerns.

Volvo had planned to produce a run of 300 cars, but in the end, total production was 68 cars, plus four or five prototypes. Forty-four were built in 1956, mostly for the Swedish market, and most still survive. All but one of 1957's production went to Los Angeles, and fewer of these are still in existence. The last car to roll off the production line was chassis number 67, but later research showed that the chassis number 20 was given to two separate cars.

The upgraded version of the engine used in the P1900 was later put into the PV444 when it entered the US market in 1957.

== Gallery ==
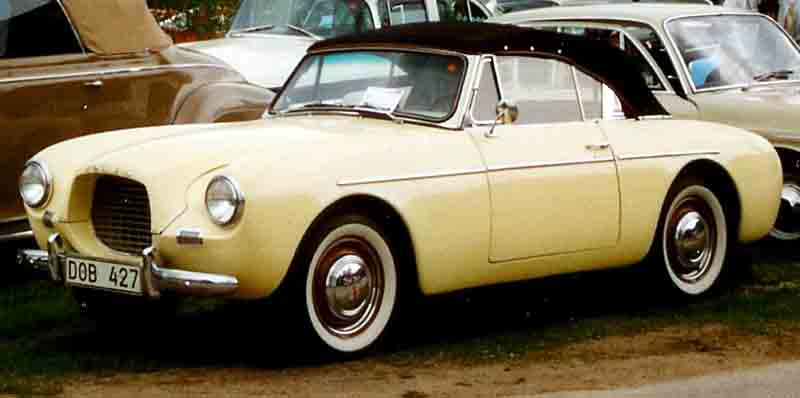
1956 Volvo Sport Cabriolet

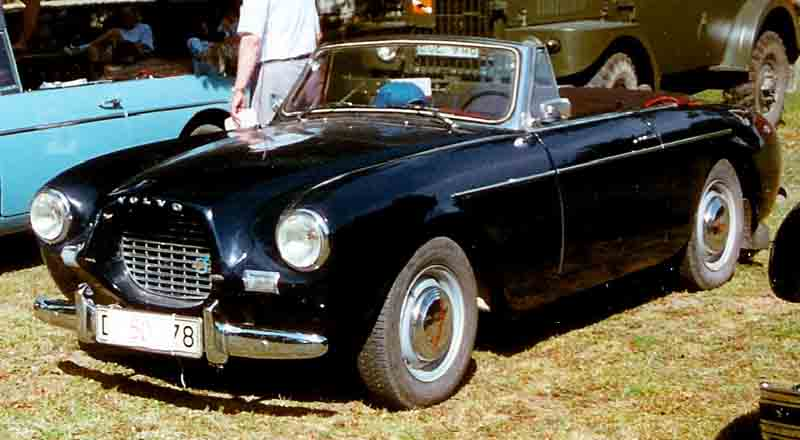
1956 Volvo Sport Cabriolet

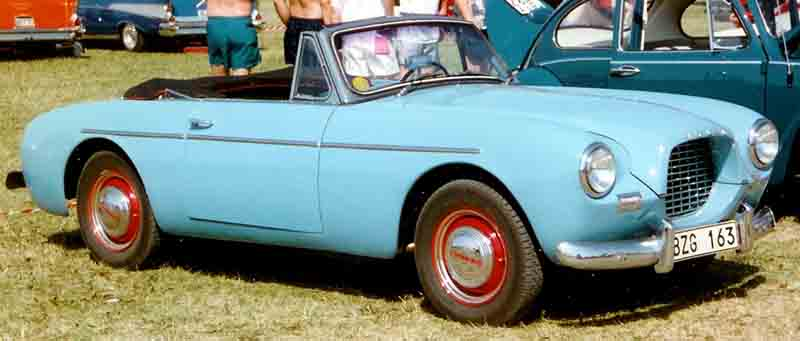
1956 Volvo Sport Cabriolet

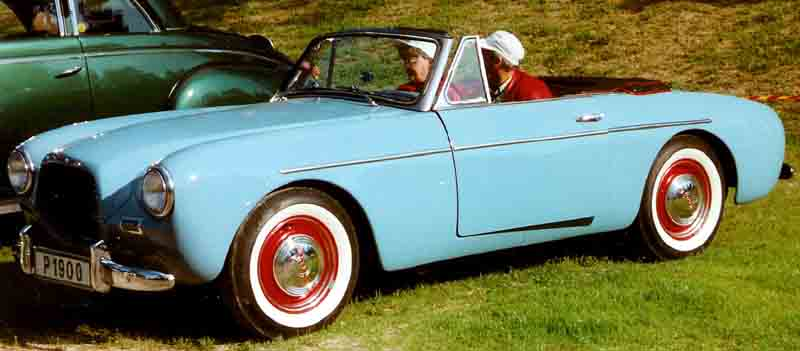
1956 Volvo P1900 Sport Cabriolet

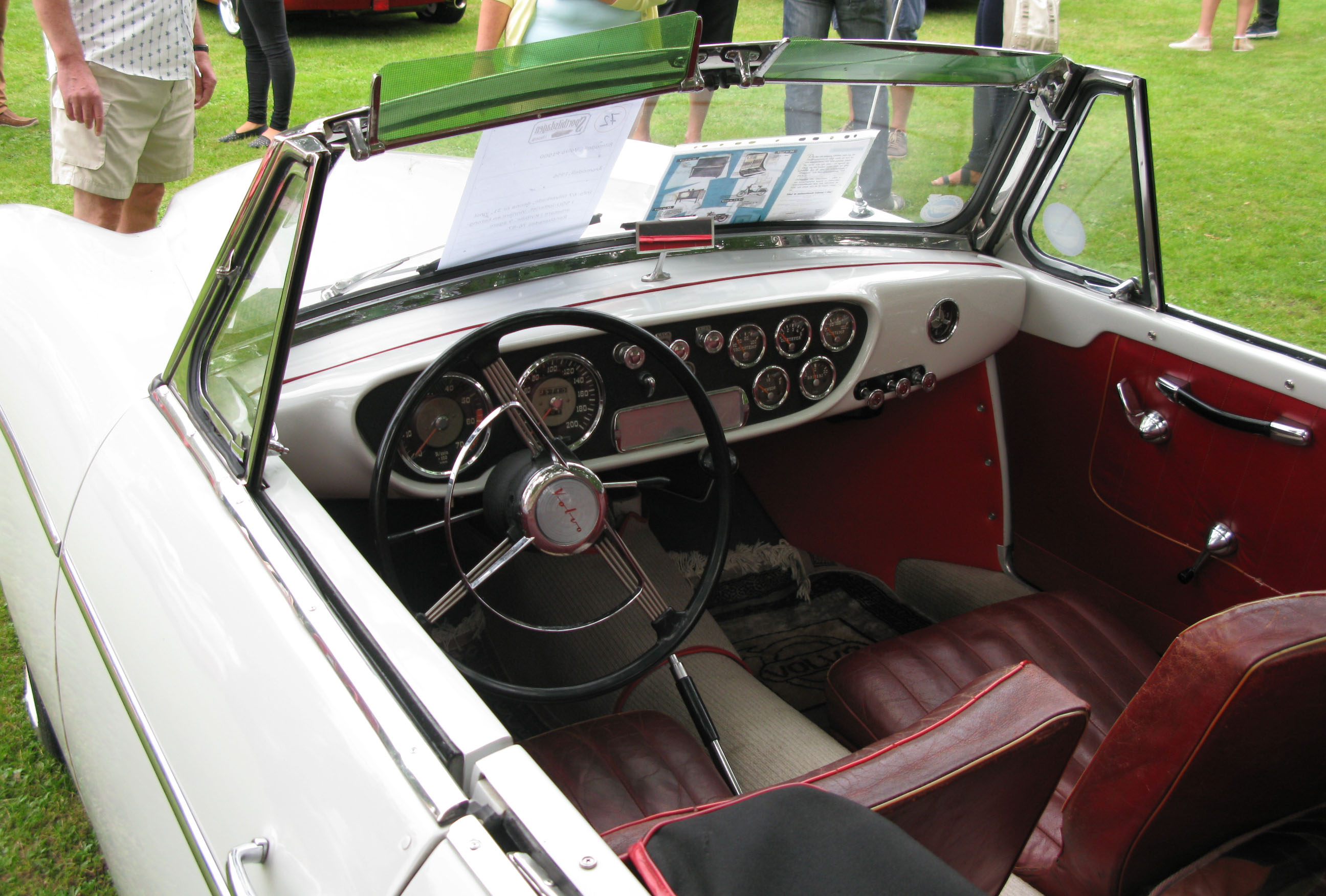
1956 Volvo P1900 Sport Cabriolet interior
