= Volvo P1800 =

Car model

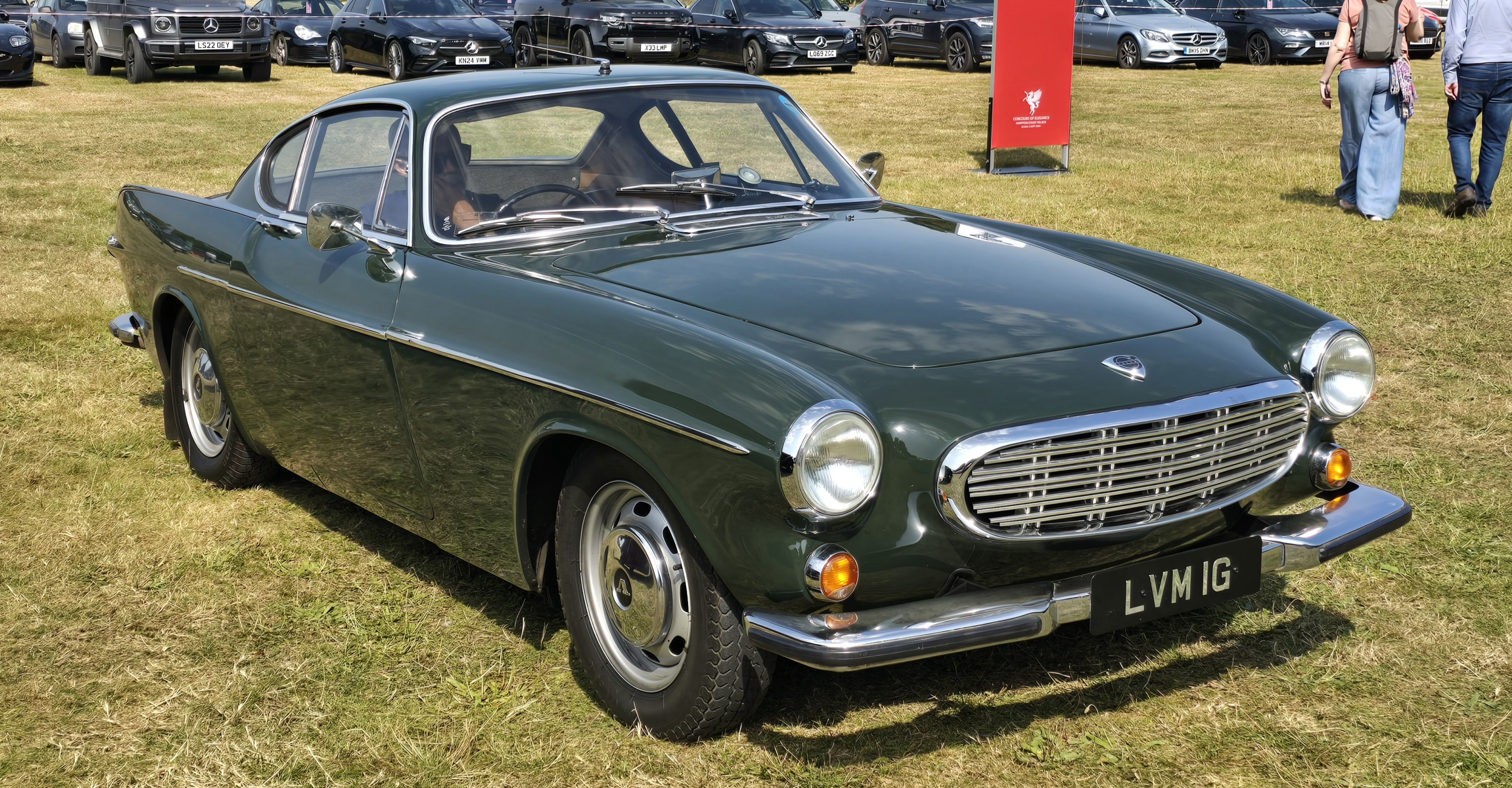
- 1969 Volvo 1800 S

Overview
- Manufacturer: Volvo Cars
- Production: 1961–1973; coupé: 39,407; sports estate: 8,077
- Assembly: United Kingdom: West Bromwich, England (Jensen Motors: 1961–1962); Sweden: Torslanda (1963–1973); Sweden: Gothenburg (1963–1973); Chile: Arica (DiVolvo)
- Designer: Pelle Petterson

Body and chassis
- Class: Sports car
- Body style: 2-door coupé; 3-door shooting brake
- Layout: Front-engine, rear-wheel-drive layout
- Related: Volvo Amazon

Powertrain
- Engine: 1,778 cc B18 I4; 1,986 cc B20B/E/F I4
- Transmission: 4-speed Volvo M40 manual; 4-speed Volvo M41 manual with Laycock overdrive; 3-speed Borg-Warner 35 automatic

Dimensions
- Wheelbase: 2,450 mm (96.5 in)
- Length: 4,350–4,400 mm (171.3–173.2 in)
- Width: 1,700 mm (66.9 in)
- Height: 1,280–1,285 mm (50.4–50.6 in)
- Curb weight: 1,130–1,175 kg (2,491–2,590 lb)

Chronology
- Predecessor: Volvo P1900

The Volvo P1800 (pronounced eighteen-hundred) is a 2+2, front-engine, rear-drive sports car manufactured and marketed by Volvo Cars between 1961 and 1973. Originally a coupé (1961–1972), it was also offered in a shooting brake configuration toward the end of its production (1972–1973). Styling was by Pelle Petterson under the tutelage of Pietro Frua when Frua's studio was a subsidiary of the Italian Carrozzeria Ghia, and the mechanicals were derived from Volvo's Amazon/122 series.

Marketed as a touring car rather than a sports car, the P1800 became widely known when driven by British actor Roger Moore in the television series The Saint, which aired from 1962 to 1969. In 1998, an 1800S owned by Irv Gordon (1940–2018) was certified as the highest mileage private vehicle driven by the original owner in non-commercial service—having exceeded 3.25 million miles (over 5.23 million km) as of his death in 2018.

== History ==
The project was originally started in 1957 because Volvo wanted a sports car to compete in the US & European markets, despite the fact that their previous attempt, the P1900, had failed to take off with only 68 cars sold. The man behind the project was an engineering consultant to Volvo, Helmer Petterson, who in the 1940s was responsible for the Volvo PV444. Unknown to him, design work was done by his son Pelle, under the tutelage of Italian auto stylist Pietro Frua while Frua's studio as a subsidiary of the prestigious carrozzeria Ghia. Volvo insisted it was an Italian design by Frua and only officially recognized Pelle Petterson's authorship in 2009. Carrozzeria Frua built the first three prototypes between September 1957 and early 1958, later designated by Volvo in September 1958: P958-X1, P958-X2 and P958-X3 (P:Project, 9:September, 58:Year 1958 = P958, X1: eXperiment 1).

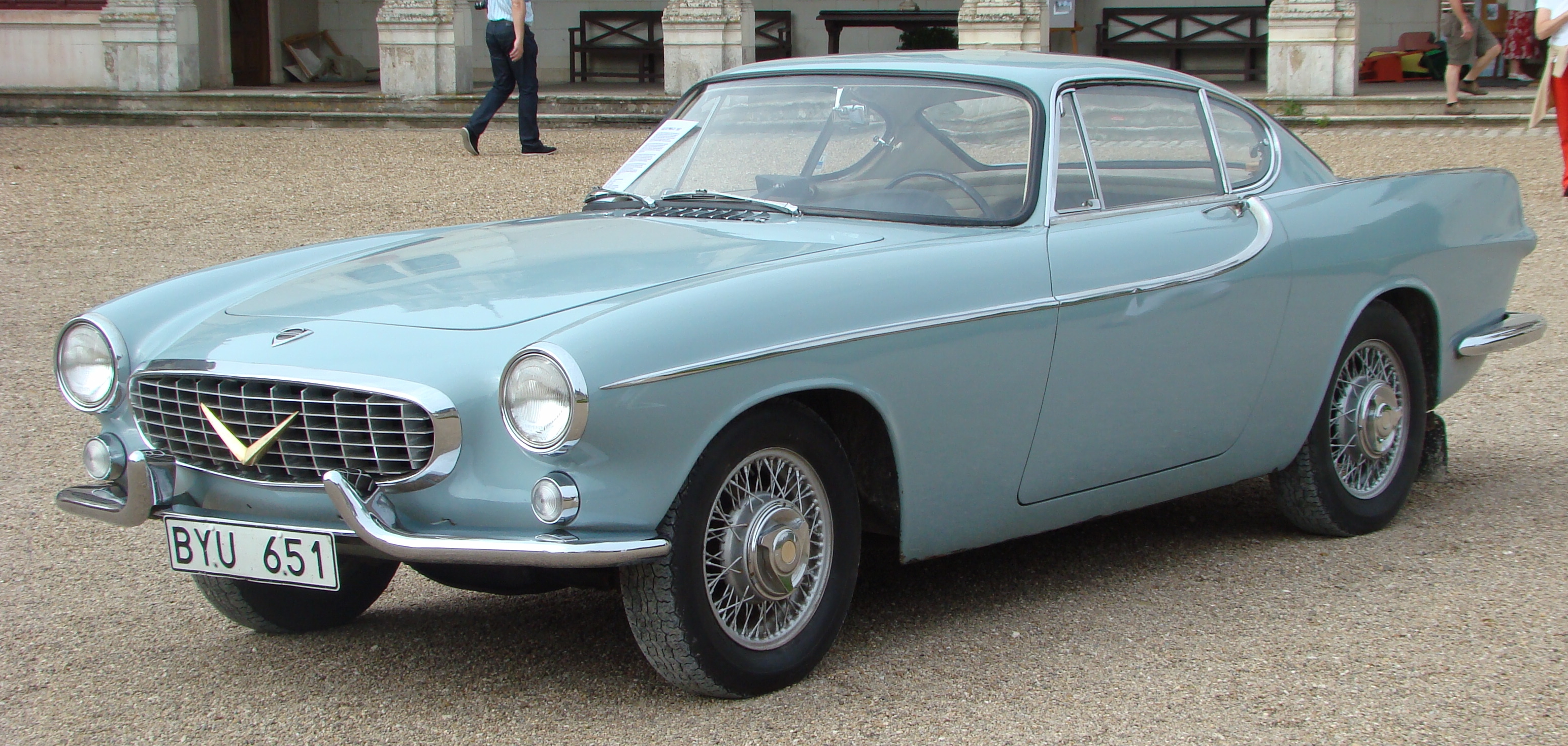
1957 Prototype P958-X1

In December 1957 Helmer Petterson transported by truck X1, (the first hand-built P1800 prototype) to Osnabrück, West Germany, headquarters of Karmann. Petterson hoped that Karmann would be able to take on the tooling and building of the P1800. Karmann's engineers had already been preparing working drawings from the wooden styling buck at Frua. Petterson and Volvo chief engineer Thor Berthelius met there, tested the car and discussed the construction with Karmann. They were ready to build it and this meant that the first cars could hit the market as early as December 1958. But in February, Karmann's most important customer, Volkswagen, reportedly forbade Karmann to take on the job, with some sources suggesting that they threatened to break their contract with Karmann for the production of the Karmann-Ghia. Other sources say that it was Karmann who said no to taking on full construction of the car, due to increased orders from Volkswagen, but that they offered to carry out the design work, the manufacture of tools and the pressing of sheet metal parts.

Other German firms, NSU, Drauz and Hanomag, were contacted and submitted quotes, with NSU reportedly being the most expensive. In the end, though, none were chosen.

It began to appear that Volvo might never produce the P1800. This motivated Helmer Petterson to obtain financial backing from two financial firms with the intention of buying the components directly from Volvo and marketing the car himself. At this point, Volvo had made no mention of the P1800 and the factory would not comment. Then a press release surfaced with a photo of the car, putting Volvo in a position where they had to acknowledge its existence. These events influenced the company to renew its efforts: the car was presented to the public for the first time at the Brussels Motor Show in January 1960 and Volvo turned to Jensen Motors, whose production lines were under-utilised, and they agreed on a contract for 10,000 cars. The Linwood, Scotland, body plant of manufacturer Pressed Steel was in turn sub-contracted by Jensen to create the unibody shells, which were then taken by rail to be assembled at Jensen in West Bromwich, England. In September 1960, the first production P1800 (for the 1961 model year) left Jensen.

=== P1800 ===
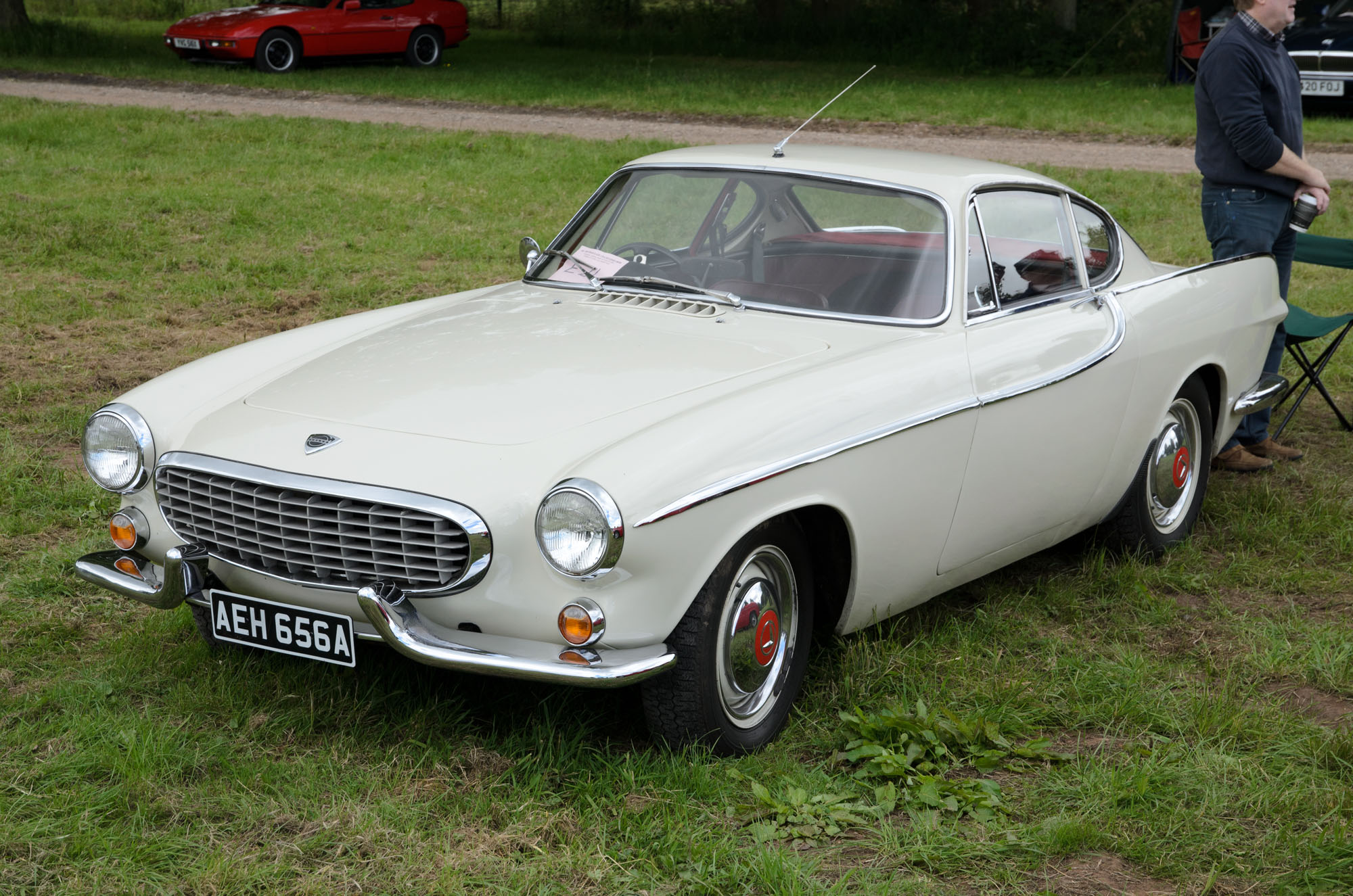
1963 Volvo P1800S

The engine was the B18 (B for the Swedish word for gasoline: Bensin; 18 for 1800 cc displacement) with dual SU carburettors, producing 100 hp (75 kW). This variant (named B18B) had a higher compression ratio than the slightly less powerful twin-carb B18D used in the contemporary Amazon 122S, as well as a different camshaft. Some have suggested that the B18 was developed from the B36 V8 engine used in Volvo trucks, but differences between the engines cause others to dispute that origin. The B18 furnished the P1800 with a strong engine boasting five main crankshaft bearings. The B18 was matched with the new and more robust M40 manual gearbox through 1963. From 1963 to 1972 the M41 gearbox with electrically actuated Laycock de Normanville overdrive was a popular option. Two overdrive types were used, the D-Type through 1969, and the J-type through 1973. The J-type had a slightly shorter ratio of 0.797:1 as opposed to 0.756:1 for the D-type. The overdrive effectively gave the 1800 series a fifth gear, for improved fuel efficiency and decreased drivetrain wear. Cars without overdrive had a numerically lower-ratio differential, which had the effect of giving them a slightly higher top speed (just under 120 mph (193 km/h)) than the more popular overdrive models. This was because the non-overdrive cars could reach the engine's redline in top gear, while the overdrive-equipped cars could not, giving them a top speed of roughly 110 mph (177 km/h).

=== 1800S ===
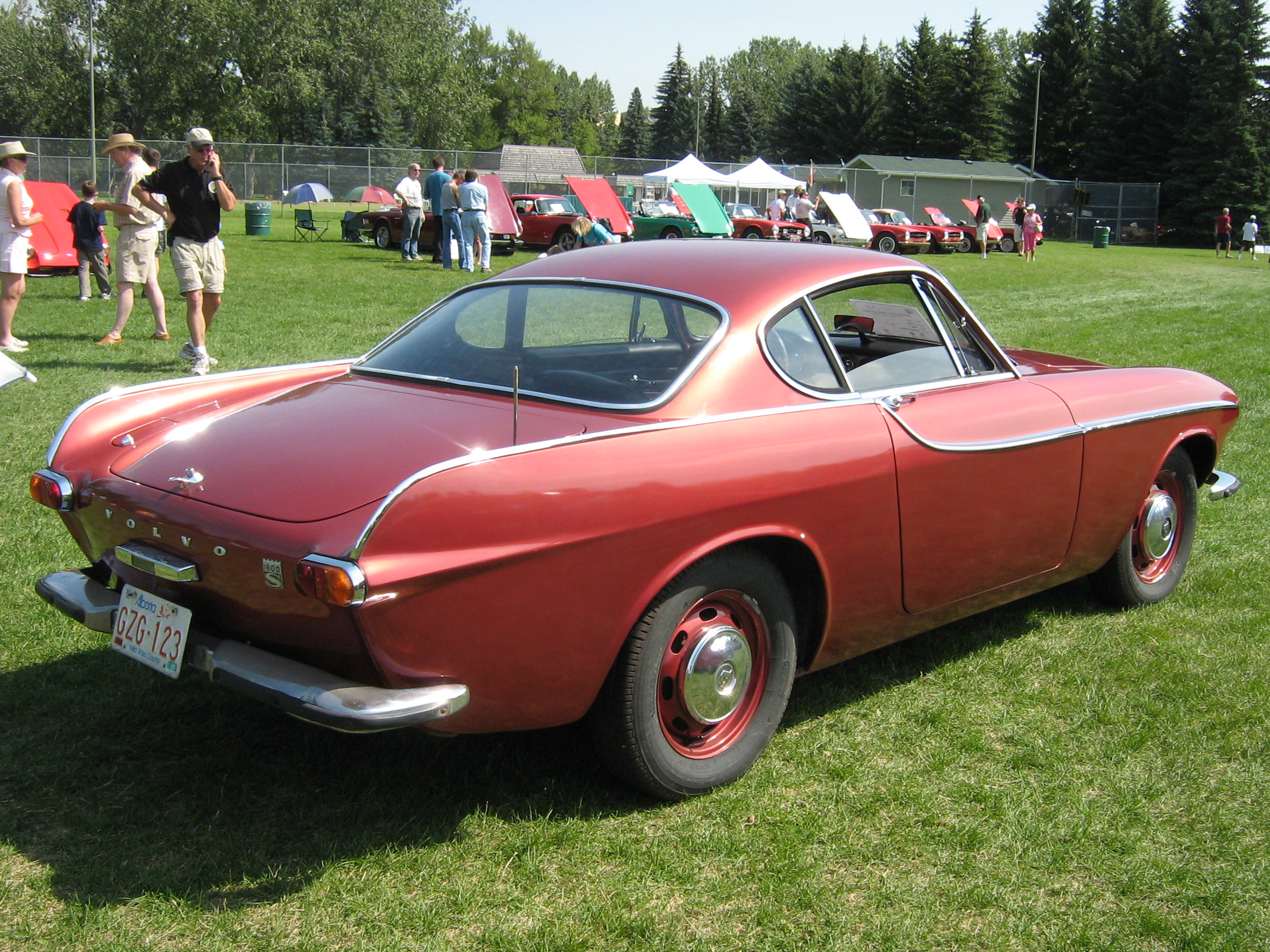
1966 Volvo 1800S rear

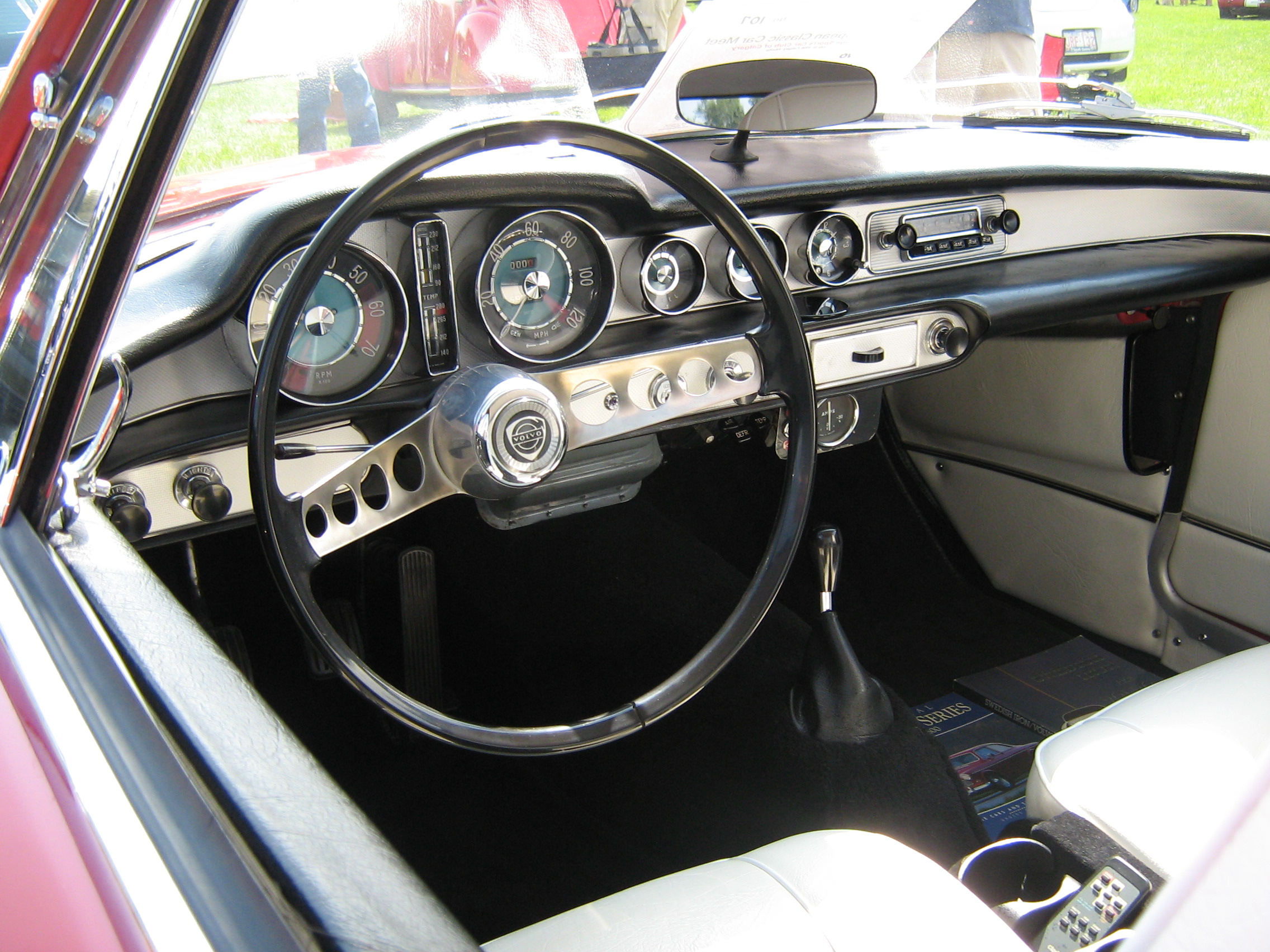
1966 Volvo P1800 interior

As time progressed, Jensen had problems with quality control, so the contract was ended early after 6,000 cars had been built. In 1963 production was moved to Volvo's Lundby Plant in Gothenburg and the car's name was changed to 1800S (S standing for Sverige, or in English: Sweden). The engine was improved with an additional 8 hp (6 kW). In 1966 the four-cylinder engine was updated to 115 bhp (86 kW). Top speed was 175 km/h (109 mph). In 1969 the B18 engine was replaced with the 2-litre B20B variant of the B20 giving 118 bhp (88 kW), though it kept the designation 1800S.

=== 1800E ===
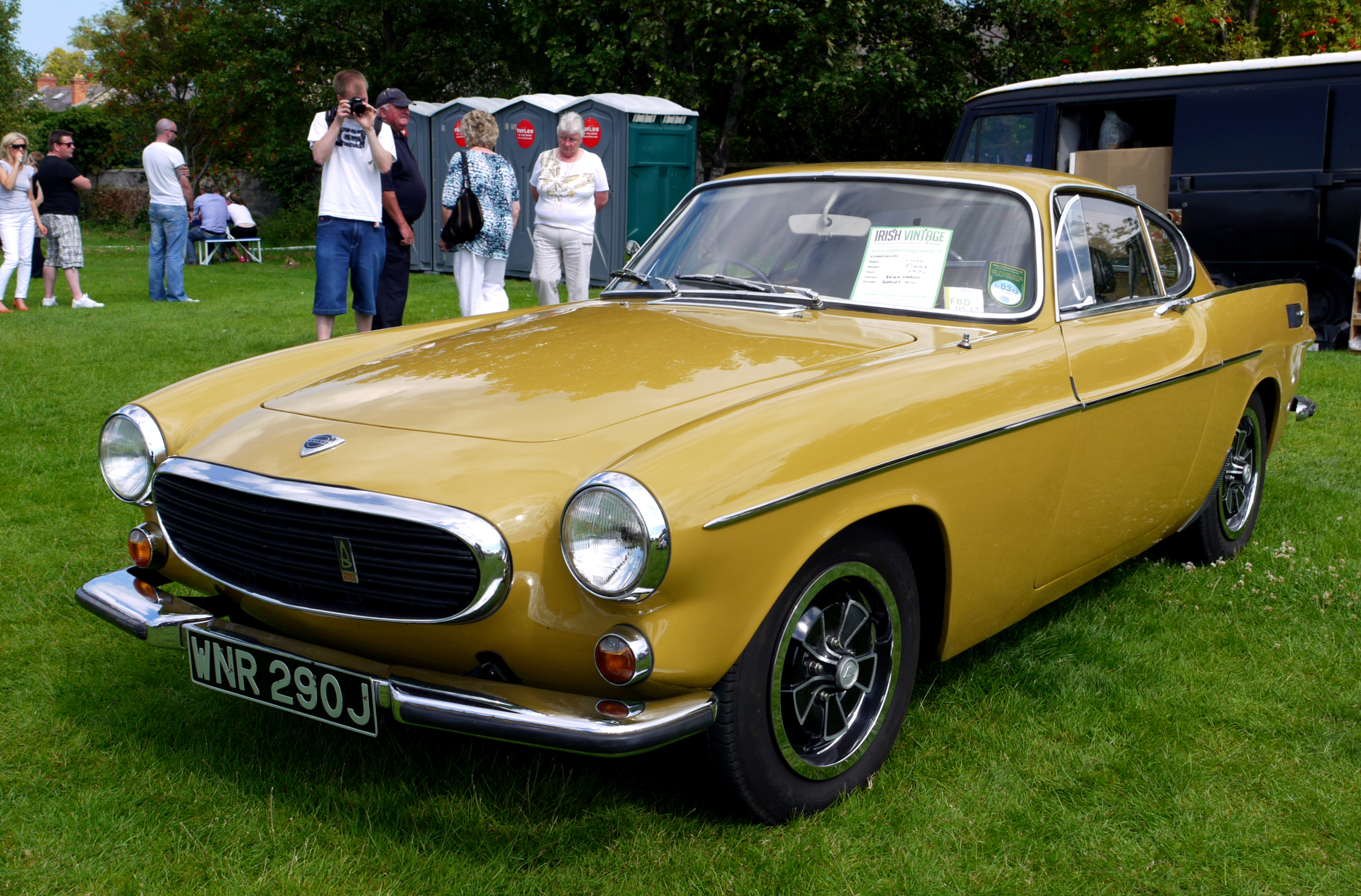
1970 Volvo 1800E

For 1970 numerous changes came with the fuel-injected 1800E (the 'E' stands for Einspritzung, the German word for fuel injection), which had the B20E engine with Bosch D-Jetronic fuel injection and a revised camshaft, and produced 130 bhp (97 kW) without sacrificing fuel economy. Top speed was around 190 km/h (118 mph) and acceleration from 0–100 km/h (0–62.1 mph) took 9.5 seconds. In addition, the 1970 model was the first 1800 with four-wheel disc brakes; until then the 1800 series had front discs and rear drums. In 1972 a lower compression B20F engine was introduced for specific markets to meet emission standards, mainly for the US. Along with the new "F" head, the ECU, manifold pressure sensor, and head gasket were also changed for all cars with B20F engine.

=== 1800ES ===
Volvo introduced its final P1800 variant, the 1800ES, in 1972 as a two-door shooting brake layout with a frameless, all-glass tailgate. The final design was chosen after two prototypes had been built by Sergio Coggiola and Pietro Frua. Frua's prototype, Raketen ("the Rocket"), is in the Volvo Museum. Both Italian prototypes were considered too futuristic, and instead in-house designer Jan Wilsgaard's proposal, the Beach Car, was accepted. The ES engine was downgraded to 125 bhp (93 kW) by reducing the compression ratio with a thicker head gasket (engine variant B20F); although maximum power was slightly down the engine was less "peaky" and the car's on-the-road performance was actually improved.

Volvo 1800ES

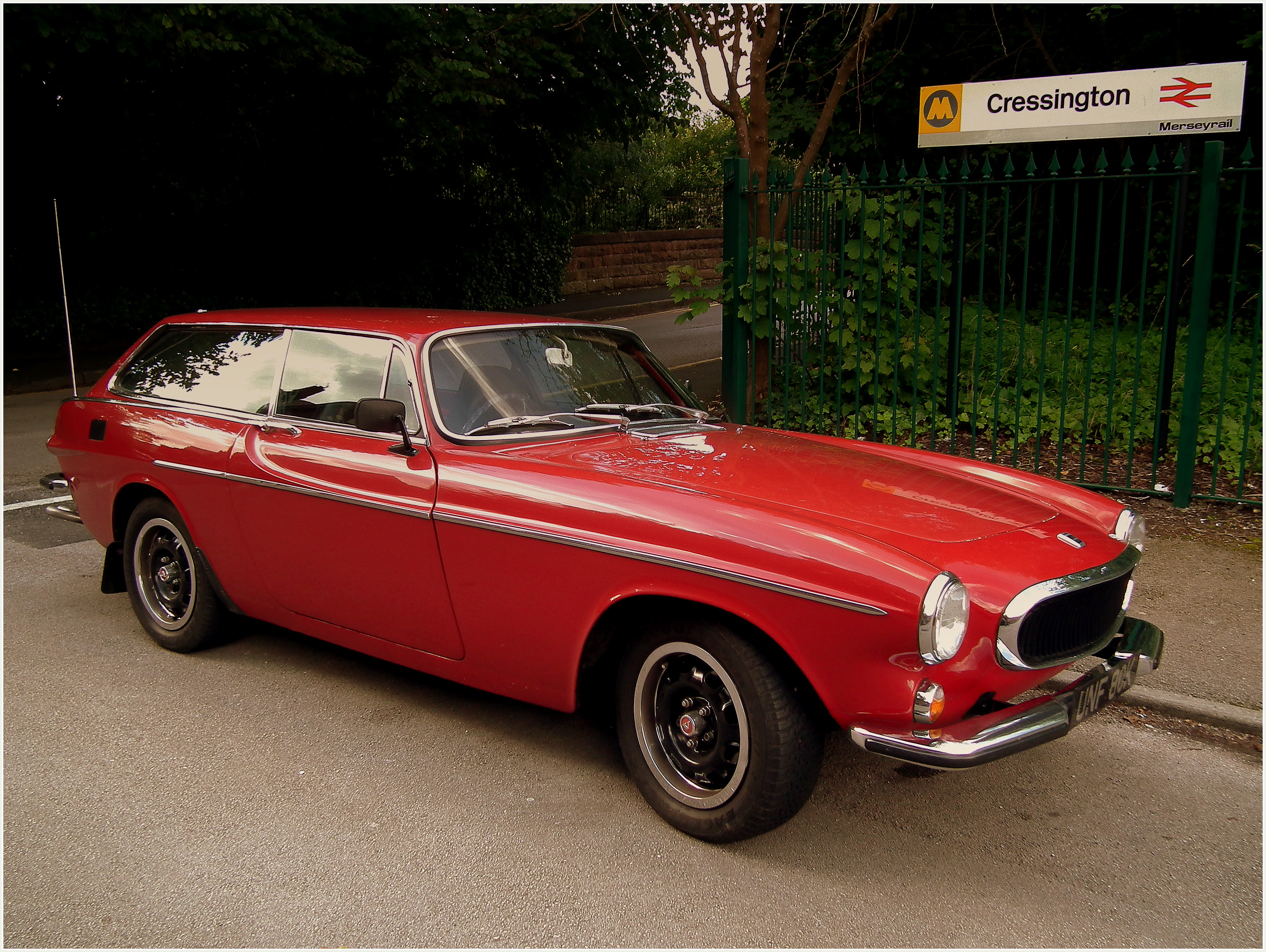
Front

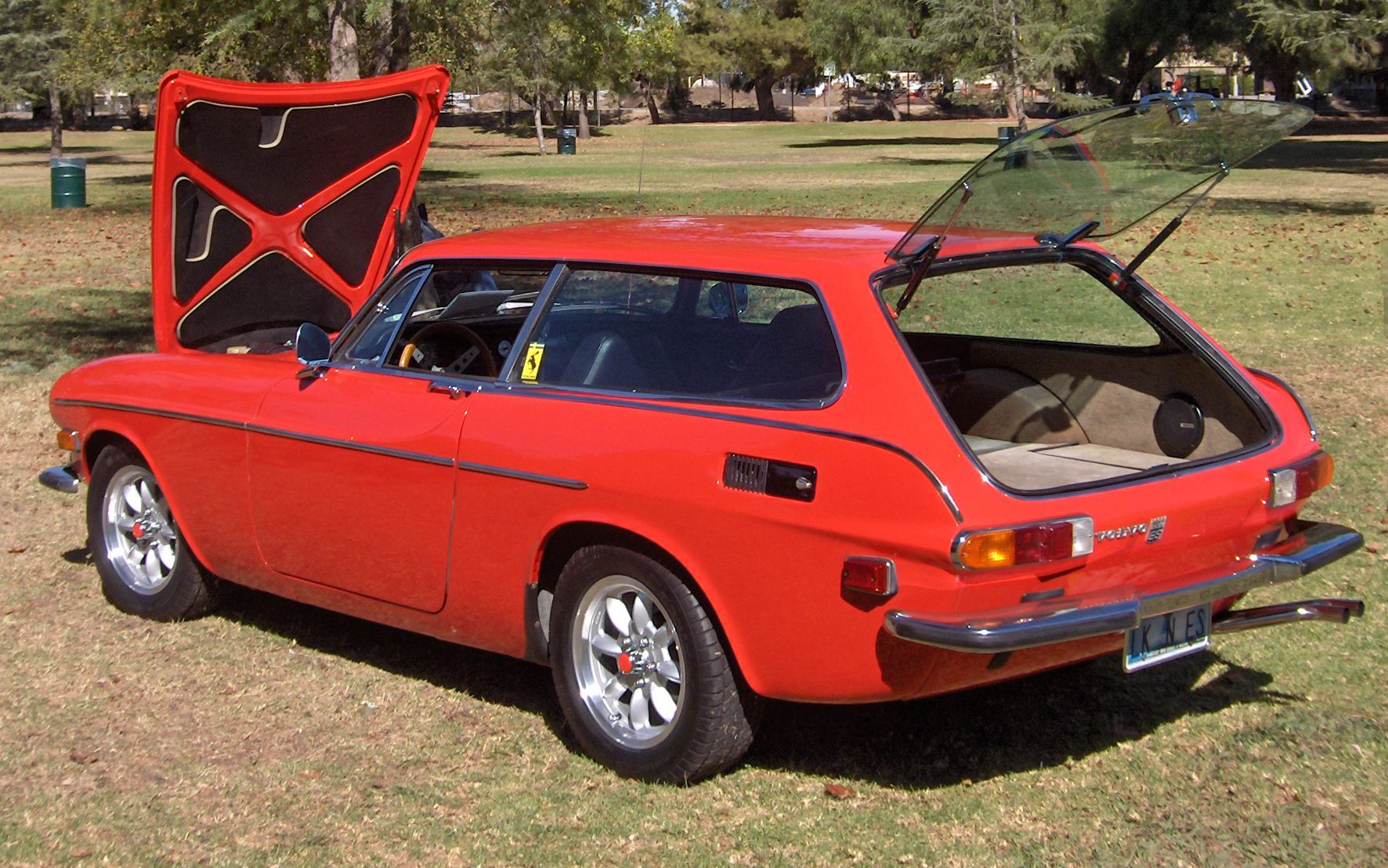
Rear

The ES's rear backrest folded down to create a long flat loading area. As an alternative to the usual four-speed plus overdrive manual transmission, a Borg-Warner three-speed automatic was available in the 1800ES. With stricter American safety and emissions standards looming for 1974, Volvo did not see fit to spend the considerable amount that would be necessary to redesign the small-volume 1800 ES. Only 8,077 examples of the ES were built in its two model years.

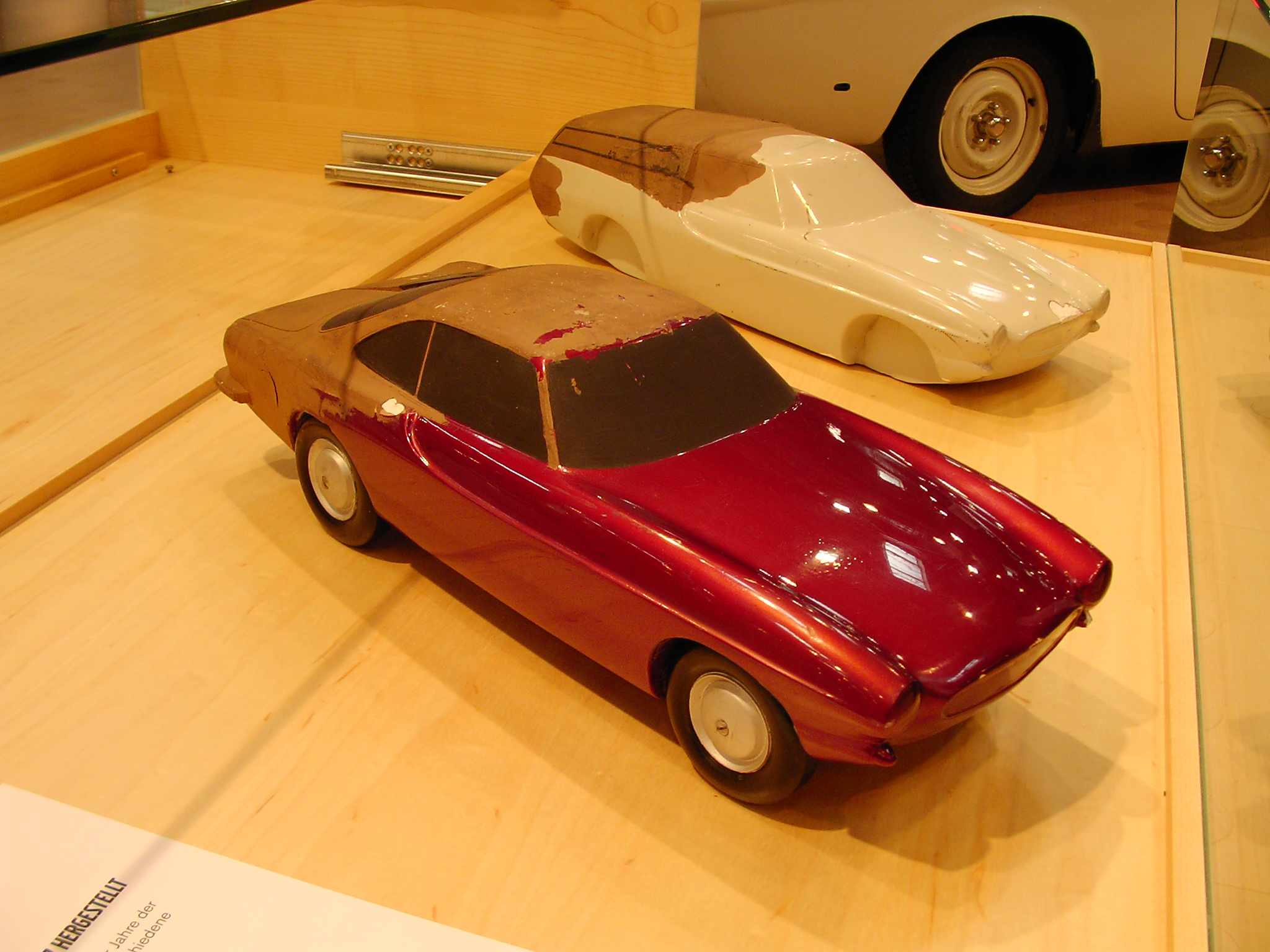
Plaster models scale 1:10 based on Pelle Petterson prototyping used by Volvo design department from 1957 onward for considering design updates (estate)

==== Influence ====
The all-glass rear hatch of the ES-model proved to be very popular with future Volvo-designers. Similar designs were used on the Volvo 480, on multiple concept cars and on the Volvo C30.

==== End of the line ====
For the last model year, 1973, only the 1800ES wagon was produced. Total production of the 1800 line from 1961 through 1973 was 47,492 units. Production ended on 27 June 1973, although Volvo did engage in negotiations with Coggiola concerning a possible P1800ESC. The Volvo 262C coupé was an indirect successor.

1965 Volvo P1800 convertible

Volvo never produced a convertible version of the 1800, but such cars were produced in the aftermarket most notably by Volvoville of New York, who offered them through their dealership after locally modifying stock coupes. Between 1964 and 1969 Volvoville sold some 30 convertible P1800. The list price for a 1800S was US$3,695 and the convertible cost US$1,000 more. Volvo in Gothenburg was not amused over the name or the convertible so it ended with a compromise where Volvoville got to keep the name, but stop making convertibles.

In Sweden the P1800ES was nicknamed Fiskbilen (The Fish van); in Germany and Switzerland it was nicknamed Schneewittchensarg (Snow White's coffin), because of the all-glass rear hatch.

== Popular notoriety ==
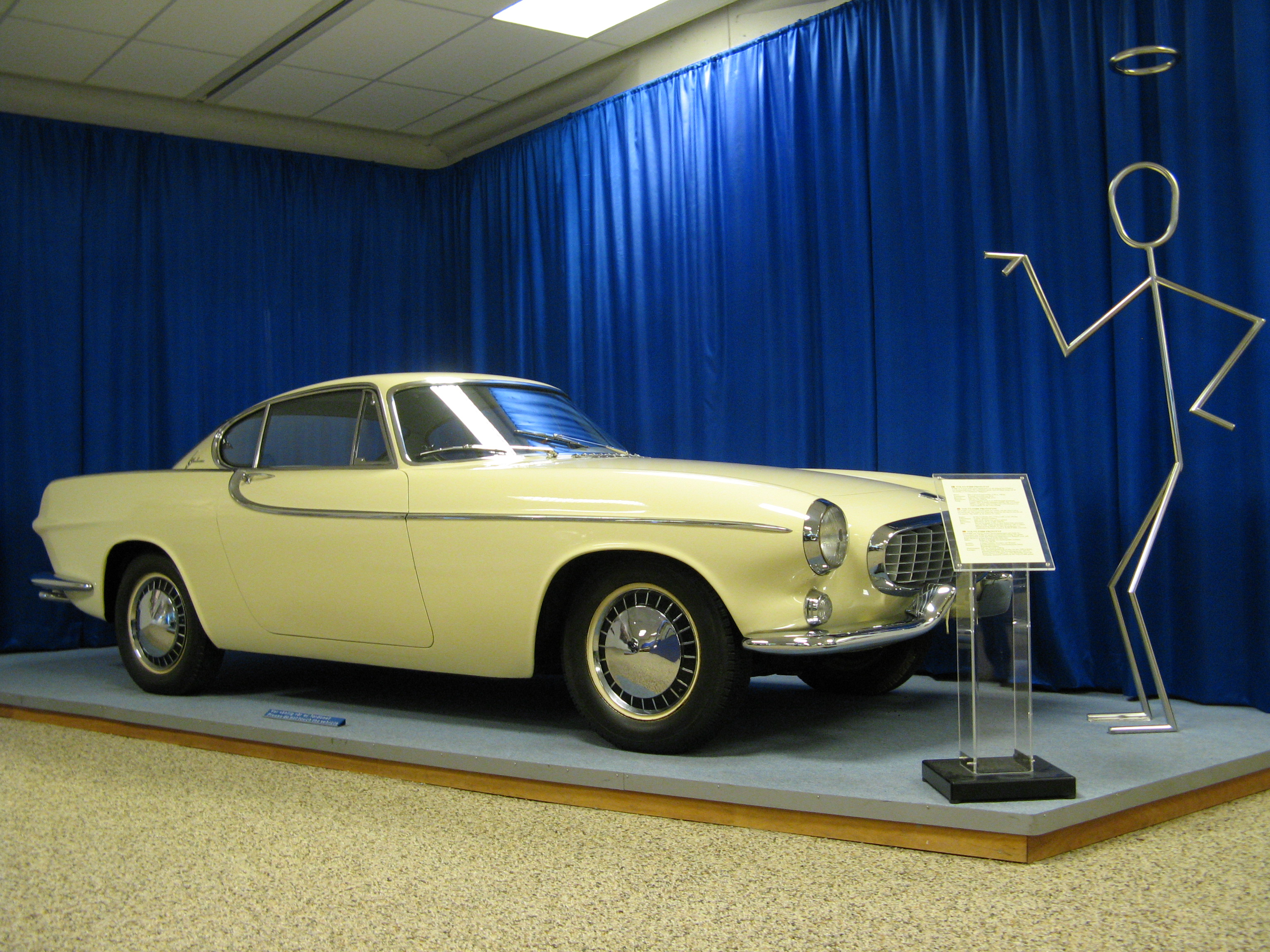
The Saint logo next to P958-X2 at Volvo Museum

The Volvo P1800 received prominence in the early 1960s when a white 1962 Volvo P1800 with number plate ST1 was driven by the character Simon Templar (Roger Moore) in the TV series The Saint (1962–1969). The car became intimately linked to the show and helped raise Volvo's profile at the time.

Roger Moore actually purchased a P1800 of his own, in the same white color as the TV car, and so was seen driving the Volvo both on-screen and around the roads of Britain.

Two new cars had been introduced at the Geneva Motor Show in 1961, a Jaguar Mark X and the Volvo P1800. Jaguar was first offered the opportunity to provide an Mark X for the TV series but declined. Volvo accepted and offered a P1800, leading to increased sales. Initially, Volvo lent two cars for the series, one for static studio shots and the other for moving shots. When the P1800S came along, one of the earlier cars was cut up to allow better interior shots.

Major Samantha Carter drove a silver-grey 1963 Volvo P1800 in the TV series Stargate SG-1 (1997–2007), as first seen in S05E03 "Ascension".

In the 2023 Goosebumps Series, Nathan Bratt (played by Justin Long), the new English teacher at Port Lawrence High School, drives a red 1800ES shooting brake.

== 50th anniversary ==
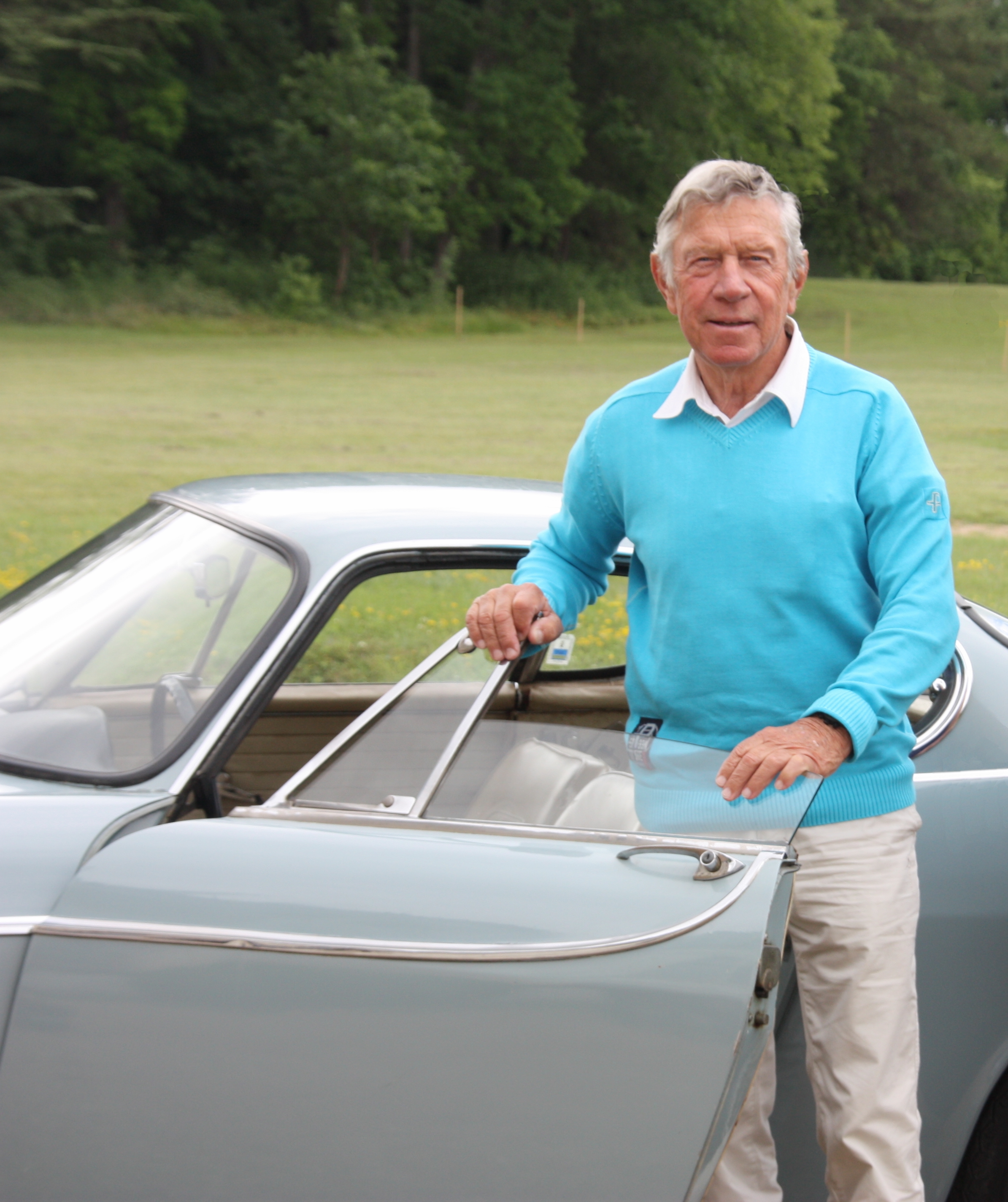
Pelle Petterson next to the P958-X1 during the 50th anniversary

The 50th anniversary of the P1800 took place in France on 13 June 2010 during the Viking Classic Auto Show, celebrating the first presentation of the P1800 to the public at the Brussels Motor Show in 1960. The show featured more than 350 Volvo cars, about 80 Volvo P1800s Europe as well as the original prototype P958-X1 — along with designer Pelle Petterson as well as Irv Gordon. The event was promoted by Volvo Cars Heritage.

== Mileage record ==
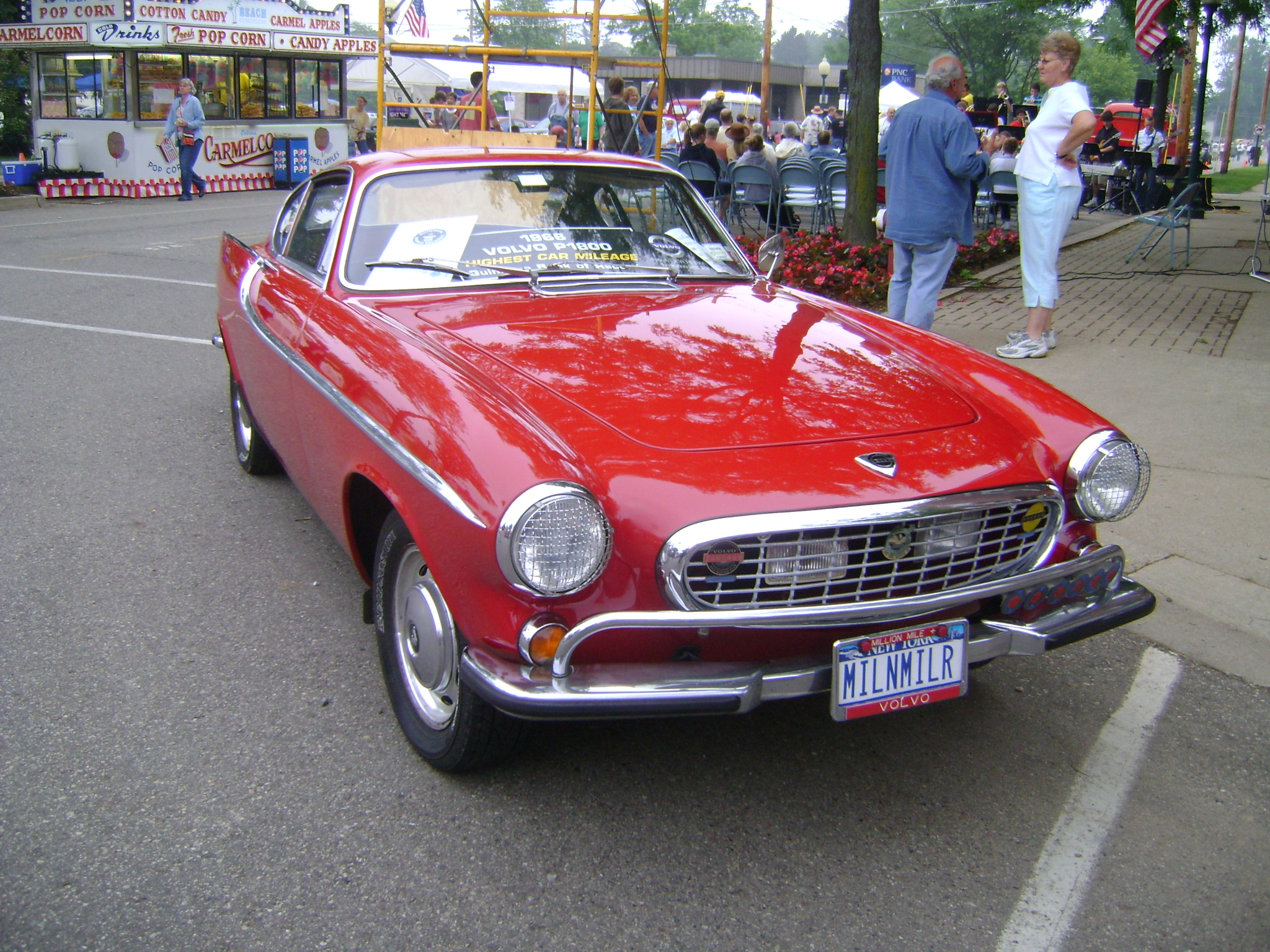
Irv Gordon's P1800S approaching 3,000,000 miles

A 1966 Volvo P1800S and its owner Irv Gordon (1940–2018) of East Patchogue, New York, have the Guinness world record for highest mileage. Gordon began driving the car in 1966, and in 1987 the car reached the one million mile mark. In 1998, it was registered as the vehicle with the highest certified mileage driven by the original owner in non-commercial service, by the Guinness Book of World Records, with a total of 1.69 million miles (2.72 million kilometres).

On 2 April 2002, Gordon and his P1800S were guests on The Tonight Show with Jay Leno, after reaching the two million mile mark.

In January 2011, Gordon and his Volvo were featured on PBS's Nova ScienceNow and in November 2011 in Hemmings Sports & Exotic Magazine.

In June 2013, when the car had reached a little over 2,996,000 miles (4,822,000 km), Volvo Cars North America (VCNA) launched an unprecedented PR campaign valuing the performance and in September 2013 the car surpassed the 3 million mile mark in Alaska.

The car had driven more than 3.2 million miles (5.1 million kilometres) by Irv Gordon's death on 15 November 2018.
