= Bill Tritt =

Bill Tritt (August 29, 1917 - March 25, 2011) was an American yacht builder.

He began working in Glass-reinforced plastic in 1948. He founded Glasspar Corporation in 1949 due to his keen interest in boats and cars and his belief in fiberglass as a material.

Before the World War II, he studied marine architecture and boat building.

He worked for Douglas Aircraft's Production Planning and Illustration Departments during World War II, and by 1945 had built a number of catamaran sailboats. In 1947, John Green, a yachtsman friend, paid Tritt to design and build a racing sailboat in the twenty foot range. Fiberglass-reinforced plastic (FRP) seemed the logical construction material, and Otto Bayer of Wizard Boats was enlisted as laminator. The boat was named the Green Dolphin, and four were built. This was Tritt's introduction to FRP.

== Boats ==
By 1947 he was building small fiberglass boats, and built the first ever fiberglass masts and spars for sailboats. This company became the Glasspar Company and moved to larger quarters in Santa Ana, California, in the early 1950s. By the mid-1950s, Glasspar was producing fifteen to twenty percent of all fiberglass boats sold in the United States. About this time Tritt incorporated and offered stock to generate working capital.

== Cars ==
Tritt also designed and built car bodies (one of the first to do so in fiberglass) as well as speedboat and runabout hulls. Tritt is credited with designing and building the first production fiberglass car called the G2. During this period he also designed and or built bodies for Blanchard Robert "Woody" Woodill, Strassberger Motor Company, British Singer Car Company, Willys, Kaiser (when Kaiser bought out Willys), Volvo, and Walt Disney. He may also have had a hand in helping GM determine the best way to fabricate fiberglass bodies for its new line of cars the Corvette. With the successes of these car bodies Tritt decided to design and build a complete sports car called the Ascot, but the Glasspar board of directors voted this down in favor of concentrating on the core business of boat building.

Recently one of Bill Tritt's G2 cars was enshrined in the Smithsonian Institution as the first production fiberglass car.
