= Glasspar =

The Glasspar boat-building company was started in 1947 when Bill Tritt began building small fiberglass boat hulls in his Costa Mesa, California fiberglass shop.

Glasspar also played a pivotal role in the automotive industry by pioneering the use of fiberglass for car bodies—most notably with the iconic 1951 Glasspar G2 roadster, which helped inspire the adoption of composite materials by major automakers.

== Origins ==
Bill Tritt had a keen interest in boats and cars before World War II, when he studied marine architecture and boat-building at California State Teacher's College in Santa Barbara, California. He worked for Douglas Aircraft's Production Planning and Illustration Departments during WWII, and by 1945 had built a number of catamaran sailboats. In 1947, John Green, a yachtsman friend, paid Tritt to design and build a racing sailboat in the 20-foot (6.1 m) range. Fiberglass seemed the logical construction material, and Otto Bayer of Wizard Boats was enlisted as laminator. The boat was named the Green Dolphin, and four were built in various lengths. This was Tritt's first effort in fiberglass-reinforced plastic (FRP). By 1948 he was building small fiberglass sailing dinghies, and built the first ever fiberglass masts and spars for sailboats. This company became the Glasspar Company and moved to larger quarters from Industrial Way in Costa Mesa to Harbor Blvd in Costa Mesa, California, in 1950. By 1951, Glasspar moved again to larger quarters in Santa Ana, California. By the mid-1950s, Glasspar was producing 15 to 20 percent of all fiberglass boats sold in the U.S. By 1958, branch factories were operating in Nashville, Tennessee, Petersburg, Virginia, Olympia, Washington, and Sherman, Texas.

== Products ==
Glasspar built boats in ranges from car toppers to 21-foot (6.4 m) models and everything in between. Just prior to 1969, when Glasspar was sold off, there were even 21-and-25-foot (6.4 and 7.6 m) oceangoing models. Boats were often given Mediterranean-sounding names, and the boat classes within the model were often indicated by a model type then model name, with a hyphen in between. For example, in the 14-foot (4.3 m) range there was a model called the Lido, which came in three configurations: the Sport-Lido, Club-Lido, and Lido (standard). Another line, called the Mariner, included the Sport-Mariner, Club-Mariner, or Mariner (standard) model. Some boat models were also named for areas in and around Southern California, such as Avalon on the island of Catalina and Del Mar, a coastal community north of San Diego.

Models included, but were not limited to;

- Sea Lion, a 12' runabout
- Sears and Roebuck car-topper (developed and built for Sears)
- Wing boats for Mantz Aircraft – carried under the wings of converted Navy PBYs
- Dincat, a 12' sailing dinghy with FG mast
- Dinkitten, an 8' sailing dinghy and popular yacht tender with FG mast
- Privateer, a 20' cat-ketch rigged sailboat with unstayed fiberglass masts
- Balboa – a 13-foot (4.0 m) car-topper
- Superlight – a 10-foot car-topper
- Marathon – an under-14-foot (4.3 m) runabout
- Lido Series – a-14-foot runabout
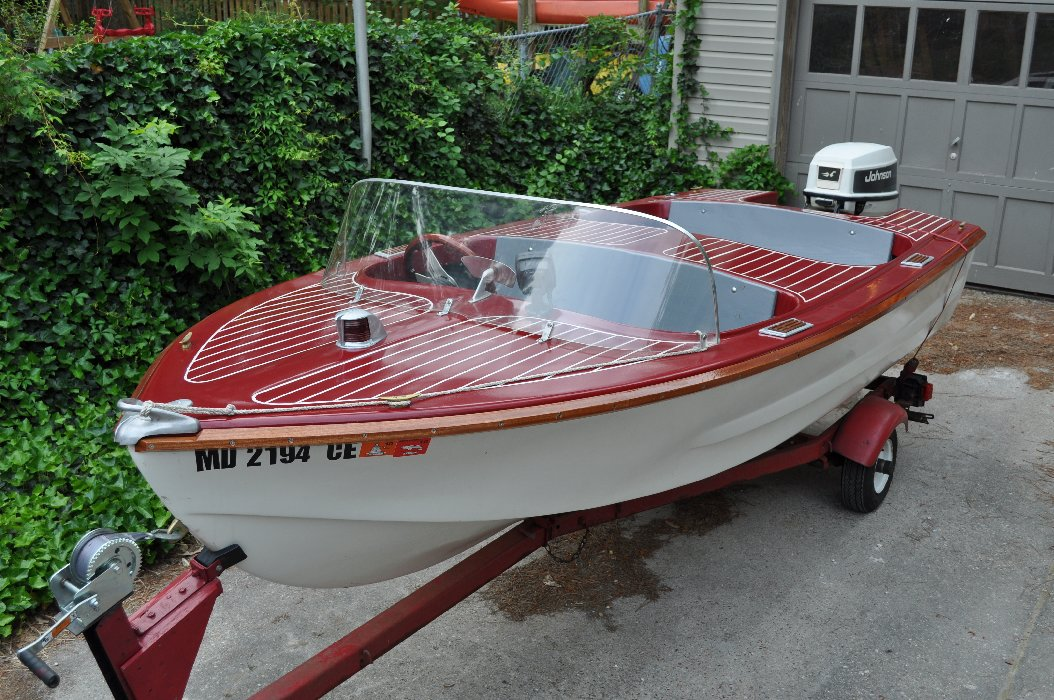
  1956 Glasspar Club Lido
- Citation – a 16-foot (4.9 m) runabout
- Avalon – a 16-foot runabout
- G3 – a 14-foot (4.3 m) high-performance ski boat
- SuperG – a 16-foot (4.9 m) high-performance ski boat
- Seafair Series – a 17-foot (5.2 m) cruising class
- Flying V-175 – a 17-foot (5.2 m) cruising class
- del Mar – a 16-foot (4.9 m) cabin cruiser
- Tacoma – an under-14-foot (4.3 m) runabout
- Ventura – a 21-foot (6.4 m) fishing cabin cruiser
- Meridian 21 – a 21-foot fishing cabin cruiser similar to the Ventura
- Meridian 25 – a 25-foot (7.6 m) ocean fishing boat. There was a limited quantity, and a restoration project is currently underway by the Official Glasspar Owners Association.
- 30 Footer – A 30-foot flying bridge cabin cruiser that never saw production. It was designed and built at the Glasspar R&D department by Bill Tritt prior to his leaving the company in 1960. The boards short-sighted decision to not build this model, along with aircraft parts and the entire automotive line, was the reason Tritt resigned from his own company.

=== Automotive history ===
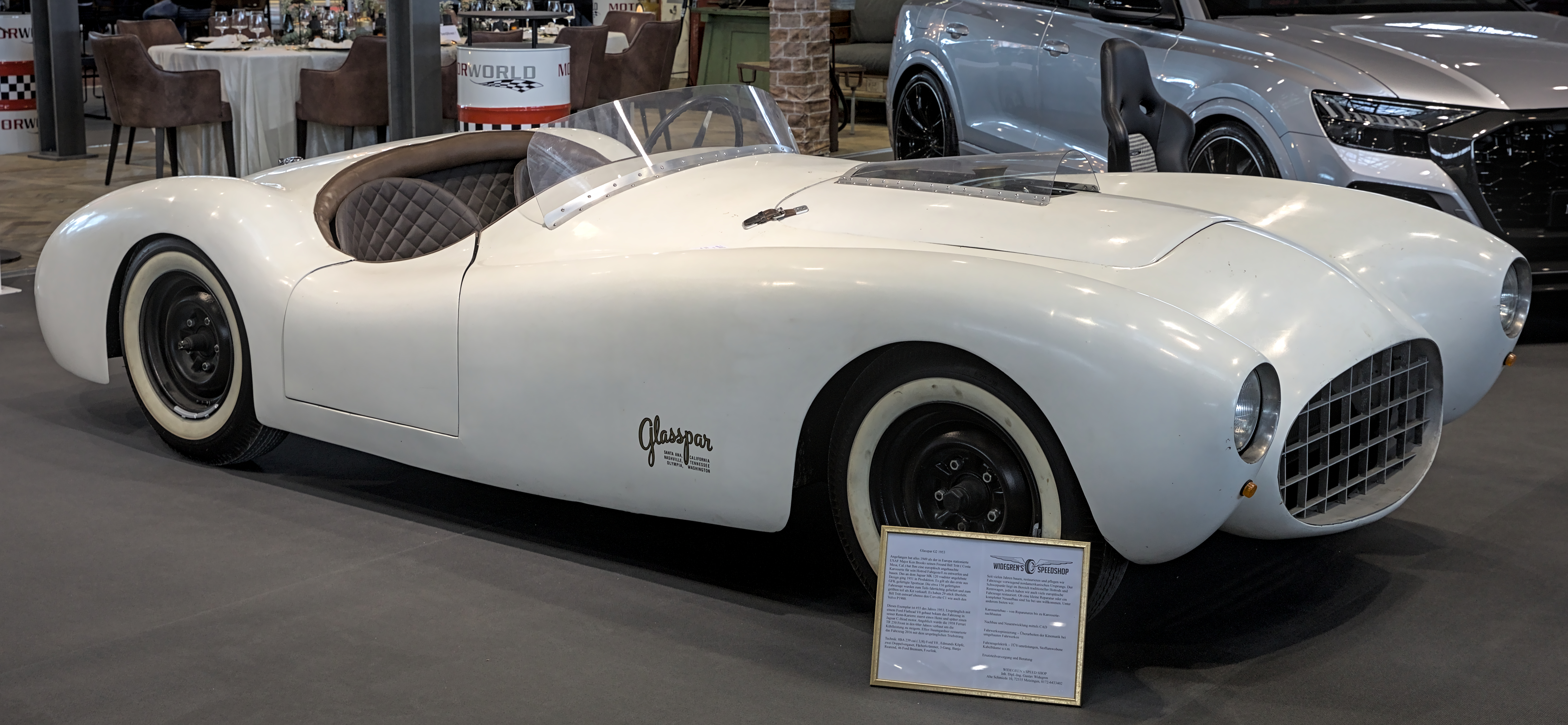
Glasspar G2 (1953)

While best known as one of America's premier post-war fiberglass boat builders, Glasspar played a foundational and transformative role in the history of automotive design and composite manufacturing during the 1950s. Founded by naval architect and designer Bill Tritt in Costa Mesa, California, in 1947, the company successfully adapted marine fiberglass-reinforced plastic (FRP) molding techniques to automotive coachbuilding. Through its own production vehicles, custom body kits, and contract manufacturing for major domestic and international automakers, Glasspar helped prove the viability of composite materials as a lightweight, rust-proof alternative to stamped steel.Origins and the Glasspar G2 (1950–1955)Glasspar's entry into the automotive sector began in 1950 when U.S. Air Force Major Kenneth Brooks commissioned Bill Tritt to design and fabricate a custom sports car body for a modified Willys Jeep chassis. Completed in 1951 and initially christened the Brooks Boxer, the prototype featured a sleek, low-slung European-inspired roadster profile—drawing subtle styling cues from the Jaguar XK120—molded as a remarkably rigid, one-piece fiberglass shell.Following its public debut at the 1951 Los Angeles Motorama, where it drew widespread acclaim from both enthusiasts and Detroit executives, Tritt put the design into commercial production as the Glasspar G2. Widely recognized as one of the world's first commercially produced fiberglass sports car bodies, the G2 was marketed both as a complete, turn-key sports car and as a DIY body kit. Customers could mount the G2 shell onto shortened Ford or Willys frames or purchase bespoke tubular steel chassis manufactured by Mameco (the Machine and Metal Company) in California, typically powered by Ford or Mercury flathead V8 engines. Roughly 100 to 150 G2 bodies were produced, establishing the blueprint for the American custom and kit car movement of the 1950s. In 1953, a Mercury-powered Glasspar G2 also demonstrated its endurance in international competition by racing in the grueling Carrera Panamericana across Mexico.Influence on the Chevrolet CorvetteThe commercial and technical success of the Glasspar G2 had an immediate impact on the Big Three automakers in Detroit. In 1951 and 1952, General Motors' vice president of styling, Harley Earl, closely inspected the G2 and recognized the sculptural freedom, low tooling costs, and weight savings offered by fiberglass reinforced plastic. The G2 served as a primary catalyst for General Motors' decision to abandon steel in favor of a fiberglass body for its landmark sports car, the Chevrolet Corvette, which debuted as a Motorama concept in January 1953 and entered production later that year.The Kaiser Darrin Partnership (1953–1954)Glasspar's expertise in large-scale fiberglass molding proved critical to the production of the Kaiser Darrin (officially the Kaiser-Darrin DKF-161), the first production fiberglass sports car to reach the American market in 1954 (beating the Chevrolet Corvette to showrooms by a matter of weeks). Styled by renowned automotive designer Howard "Dutch" Darrin—famous for its signature sliding pocket doors and split-grille front end—the car was built on a Henry J chassis.Because Kaiser Motors lacked the facilities and technical experience to mass-produce complex fiberglass body panels, the automaker contracted Bill Tritt and Glasspar to assist with engineering, tooling, and contract manufacturing. Glasspar molded the intricate multi-piece fiberglass bodies for the majority of the 435 Kaiser Darrins built for the 1954 model year at its Santa Ana and Costa Mesa facilities in California, shipping the completed shells to Kaiser's assembly plant in Jackson, Michigan.Other Notable Automotive Models and CollaborationsThroughout the mid-1950s, Glasspar engineered, manufactured, or directly influenced several other historically significant automobiles:Woodill Wildfire (1952–1956): Conceived by Southern California Dodge and Willys dealer Robert "Woody" Woodill, the first generation of the Woodill Wildfire used modified Glasspar G2 bodies and sub-components produced by Tritt's company, fitted onto custom tubular frames with Willys or Ford powertrains, before Woodill transitioned to distinct second-series body tooling.Glasspar Ascot (1954): Designed in collaboration with famed industrial designer Brooks Stevens, the Ascot was a larger, four-passenger luxury fiberglass tourer built on a modified Studebaker Commander chassis and powered by a Studebaker V8 engine, showcasing the potential of fiberglass beyond two-seat roadsters.Volvo Sport / P1900 (1954–1956): Seeking to develop an open-top sports car for export markets, Swedish automaker Volvo turned to Glasspar's industry-leading composite expertise. Volvo contracted Bill Tritt to design and build the initial prototype fiberglass bodies in California. Glasspar constructed the early shells and trained Volvo engineers in fiberglass layup and molding techniques before series production of the Volvo P1900 (of which 68 units were built) was transferred to Sweden.Disneyland's Tomorrowland Autopia (1955)Beyond street-legal automobiles, Glasspar was enlisted by Walt Disney to help bring his original theme park to life. For the grand opening of Disneyland in Anaheim, California, in July 1955, Disney Imagineer Bob Gurr designed the miniature, futuristic sports cars for the Tomorrowland Autopia attraction. Glasspar was contracted to mold the durable fiberglass bodies for the inaugural fleet of Autopia Mark I vehicles, which were mated to custom steel frames built by Mameco—the same chassis fabricator that supplied frames for the Glasspar G2.Hollywood Cinema and Johnny Dark (1954)Glasspar vehicles achieved national pop-culture visibility during the golden age of American fiberglass specials through Hollywood cinema. Most notably, a Glasspar G2 played a prominent role in Universal-International's 1954 technicolor racing drama Johnny Dark, starring Tony Curtis, Piper Laurie, and Don Taylor. Filmed on location in California and Nevada in 1953 during the height of the fiberglass sports car craze, the film featured a green Glasspar G2 (competing as Car #14, nicknamed the "Flying Arrow") racing in a cross-country border-to-border road race alongside other iconic American specials of the era, including a Woodill Wildfire, a Victress S1A, a Grantham Stardust, and a Kurtis roadster engineered by Frank Kurtis.

== End and legacy ==
The company was eventually sold to Larson Boat Works.

Restoring and preserving Glasspar boats and cars has become extremely popular in recent years. The official Glasspar Owners Association can be found at Classic Glasspars

Extensive information can be found at the Owners Association Website to include factory brochures, production data and even patents.
